= Outline of the Faroe Islands =

Overview of and topical guide to the Faroe Islands

The Flag of the Faroe Islands

The Coat of arms of the Faroe Islands

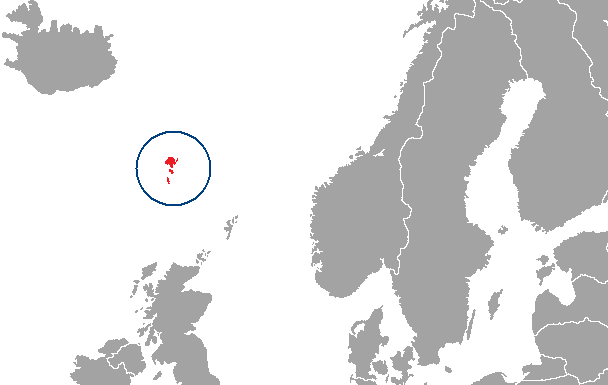
The location of the Faroe Islands

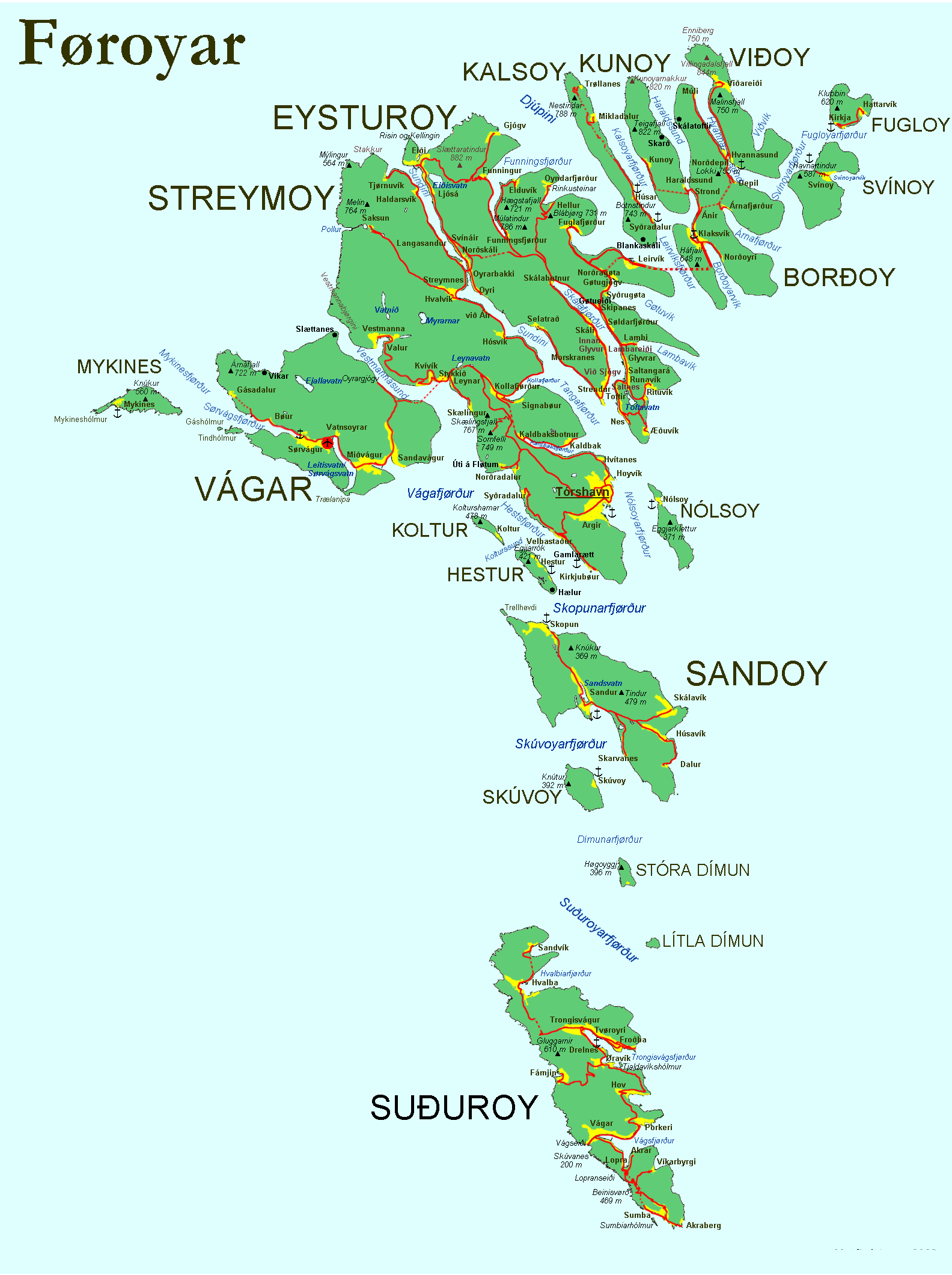
An enlargeable map of the Faroe Islands of the Kingdom of Denmark

The following outline is provided as an overview of and topical guide to the Faroe Islands:

Faroe Islands – autonomous province of the Kingdom of Denmark comprising the Faroe archipelago in the North Atlantic Ocean. The Faroe Islands are located between the Norwegian Sea and the North Atlantic Ocean, roughly equidistant between Iceland, Scotland, and Norway, and are considered a part of Northern Europe.

== General reference ==
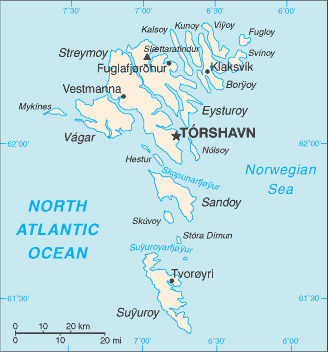
An enlargeable basic map of the Faroe Islands

- Pronunciation: /ˈfɛəroʊ/ FAIR-oh
- Common English country names: The Faroe Islands, the Faroes, or the Faeroes
- Official English country name: The Faroe Islands of the Kingdom of Denmark
- Common endonym(s): Føroyar
- Official endonym(s): Føroyar
- Adjectival: Faroe, Faroese
- Demonym(s):
- Etymology: Name of the Faroe Islands
- ISO country codes: FO, FRO, 234
- ISO region codes: See ISO 3166-2:FO
- Internet country code top-level domain: .fo

== Geography of the Faroe Islands ==
An enlargeable topographic map of the Faroe Islands

Geography of the Faroe Islands

- The Faroe Islands are: a dependent territory (specifically, self-governing overseas administrative division of) Denmark
- Location:
  - Northern Hemisphere and Western Hemisphere
  - Eurasia
    - Europe
      - Northern Europe
  - Atlantic Ocean
    - Norwegian Sea
  - Time zone: Western European Time (UTC+00), Western European Summer Time (UTC+01)
  - Extreme points of the Faroe Islands
    - High: Slættaratindur 882 m (2,894 ft)
    - Low: North Atlantic Ocean 0 m
  - Land boundaries: none
  - Coastline: 1,117 km
- Population of the Faroe Islands:
- Area of the Faroe Islands:
- Atlas of the Faroe Islands

=== Environment of the Faroe Islands ===
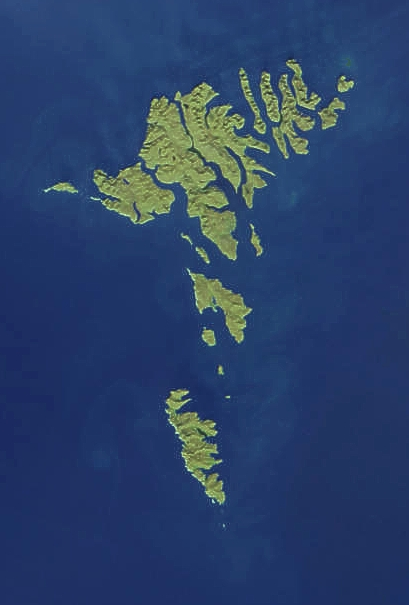
An enlargeable satellite image of the Faroe Islands

- Climate of the Faroe Islands
- Geology of the Faroe Islands
- Wildlife of the Faroe Islands
  - Flora of the Faroe Islands
  - Fauna of the Faroe Islands
    - Birds of the Faroe Islands
    - Mammals of the Faroe Islands

==== Natural geographic features of the Faroe Islands ====
- Islands of the Faroe Islands
- Lakes of the Faroe Islands
- Mountains of the Faroe Islands
- World Heritage Sites in the Faroe Islands: None

=== Regions of the Faroe Islands ===
Regions of the Faroe Islands

==== Administrative divisions of the Faroe Islands ====
Administrative divisions of the Faroe Islands

- Regions of the Faroe Islands
  - Municipalities of the Faroe Islands

===== Regions of the Faroe Islands =====
Regions of the Faroe Islands

===== Municipalities of the Faroe Islands =====
Municipalities of the Faroe Islands

- Capital of the Faroe Islands: Tórshavn
- Cities of the Faroe Islands

=== Demography of the Faroe Islands ===
Demographics of the Faroe Islands

== Government and politics of the Faroe Islands ==
Politics of the Faroe Islands

- Form of government: parliamentary representative democratic dependency
- Capital of the Faroe Islands: Tórshavn
- Elections in the Faroe Islands
  - Parliamentary elections
      - 1906
      - 1908
      - 1910
      - 1912
      - 1914
      - 1916
      - 1918
      - 1920
      - 1924
      - 1928
      - 1932
      - 1936
      - 1940
      - 1943
      - 1945
      - 1946
      - 1950
      - 1954
      - 1958
      - 1962
      - 1966
      - 1970
      - 1974
      - 1978
      - 1980
      - 1984
      - 1988
      - 1990
      - 1994
      - 1998
      - 2002
      - 2004
      - 2008
      - 2011
  - Danish elections
      - 1920 (Apr)
      - 1920 (Jul)
      - 1920 (Sep)
      - 1924
      - 1926
      - 1929
      - 1932
      - 1935
      - 1939
      - 1943
      - 1945
      - 1947
      - 1950
      - 1953 (Apr)
      - 1953 (Sep)
      - 1957
      - 1960
      - 1964
      - 1966
      - 1968
      - 1971
      - 1973
      - 1975
      - 1977
      - 1979
      - 1981
      - 1984
      - 1987
      - 1988
      - 1990
      - 1994
      - 1998
      - 2001
      - 2005
      - 2007
      - 2011
  - Referendums
    - 1946 Faroese independence referendum
    - 2009 Danish Act of Succession referendum
- Political parties in the Faroe Islands

=== Branches of the government of the Faroe Islands ===
Government of the Faroe Islands

==== Executive branch of the government of the Faroe Islands ====
- Head of state: King of Denmark, King Frederik X represented by High Commissioner of the Faroe Islands, Lene Moyell Johansen
- Head of government: Prime Minister of the Faroe Islands, Beinir Johannesen

==== Legislative branch of the government of the Faroe Islands ====
- Parliament of the Faroe Islands (Løgting) (unicameral)

==== Judicial branch of the government of the Faroe Islands ====
- Courts of Denmark – judicially, the Faroe Islands are under the jurisdiction of Denmark's court system.

=== Foreign relations of the Faroe Islands ===
Foreign relations of the Faroe Islands

- Diplomatic missions of the Faroe Islands
- Danish Realm

==== International organization membership ====
The government of the Faroe Islands is a member of:

- Arctic Council
- Food and Agriculture Organization (FAO)
- International Maritime Organization (IMO) (associate)
- Nordic Council (NC)
- Nordic Investment Bank (NIB)
- Universal Postal Union (UPU)

=== Law and order in the Faroe Islands ===
- Capital punishment in the Faroe Islands: none
- Constitution of the Faroe Islands
- Human rights in the Faroe Islands
  - LGBT rights in the Faroe Islands
    - Recognition of same-sex unions in the Faroe Islands
- Law enforcement in the Faroe Islands

=== Military of the Faroe Islands ===
Military of the Faroe Islands

- Command: Island Command Faroes is the de facto defense command
- Forces
  - Army: none, Defense is the responsibility of Denmark
  - Navy: none, Defense is the responsibility of Denmark
  - Air Force: none, Defense is the responsibility of Denmark
  - Special forces: none, Defense is the responsibility of Denmark

=== Local government in the Faroe Islands ===
List of municipalities of the Faroe Islands

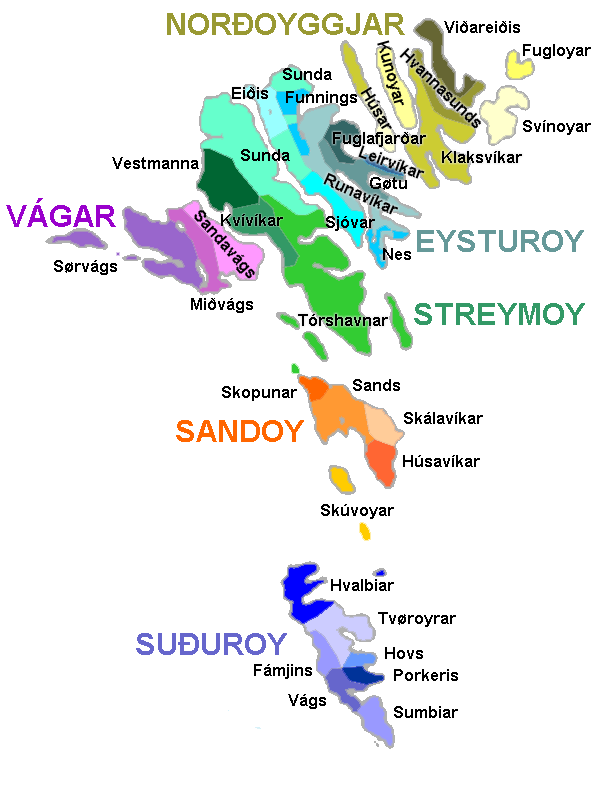
Municipalities since January 1, 2005

Municipality	Population	Inhabitants per km^{2}	Area (in km^{2})	Markatal	Island	Region
Tórshavnar kommuna	19.339	112	173	327	Streymoy	Tórshavn
Klaksvík	4.886	57	86	144	Streymoy	Klaksvík
Runavík	3.678	47	78	150	Eysturoy	Southern Eysturoy
Tvøroyri	1.819	42	43	60	Suðuroy	Suðuroy
Fuglafjørður	1.584	70	23	32	Eysturoy	Northern Eysturoy
Sunda Kommuna	1.564	10	158	152	Eysturoy	Northern Eysturoy
Vágur	1.402	67	21	61	Suðuroy	Suðuroy
Nes	1.238	88	14	40	Eysturoy	Southern Eysturoy
Vestmanna	1.234	24	52	56	Streymoy	Streymoy
Miðvágur	1.100	24	47	48	Vágar	Vágar
Sørvágur	1.071	13	84	124	Vágar	Vágar
Gøtu Kommuna	1.066	35	31	69	Eysturoy	Southern Eysturoy
Sjóvar Kommuna	1.027	31	33	70	Eysturoy	Southern Eysturoy
Leirvík	873	79	11	33	Eysturoy	Southern Eysturoy
Sandavágur	797	13	61	48	Vágar	Vágar
Hvalba	765	19	40	99	Suðuroy	Suðuroy
Eiði	705	19	37	49	Eysturoy	Northern Eysturoy
Kvívík	615	13	49	75	Streymoy	Streymoy
Sandur	586	12	48	97	Sandoy	Sandoy
Skopun	507	56	9	0	Sandoy	Sandoy
Hvannasund	441	13	33	38	Viðoy and Borðoy	Klaksvík
Sumba	383	15	25	64	Suðuroy	Suðuroy
Viðareiði	339	11	30	48	Viðoy	Norðoyggjar
Porkeri	333	24	14	37	Suðuroy	Suðuroy
Skálavík	183	6	29	24	Sandoy	Sandoy
Kunoy	157	4	35	65	Kunoy	Norðoyggjar
Húsavík	131	5	26	66	Sandoy	Sandoy
Hov	125	12	10	24	Suðuroy	Suðuroy
Fámjin	113	9	13	24	Suðuroy	Suðuroy
Funningur	75	4	18	15	Eysturoy	Northern Eysturoy
Húsar	61	4	16	41	Kalsoy	Norðoyggjar
Skúvoy	57	4	13	73	Skúvoy	Sandoy
Svínoy	52	2	27	23	Svínoy	Norðoyggjar
Fugloy	44	4	11	14	Fugloy	Norðoyggjar

== History of the Faroe Islands ==
History of the Faroe Islands

== Culture of the Faroe Islands ==
Culture of the Faroe Islands

- Cuisine of the Faroe Islands
- Languages of the Faroe Islands
- Media in the Faroe Islands
- List of museums in the Faroe Islands
- National symbols of the Faroe Islands
  - Coat of arms of the Faroe Islands
  - Flag of the Faroe Islands
  - National anthem of the Faroe Islands
- World Heritage Sites in the Faroe Islands: None

=== Art in the Faroe Islands ===
- Cinema of the Faroe Islands
- Literature of the Faroe Islands
- Music of the Faroe Islands
- Television in the Faroe Islands

=== Sports in the Faroe Islands ===
- Football in the Faroe Islands

=== Education in the Faroe Islands ===
- Education in the Faroe Islands
  - University of the Faroe Islands
  - Centre of Maritime Studies and Engineering
  - Føroya Studentaskúli og HF-Skeið

== Economy and infrastructure of the Faroe Islands ==
Economy of the Faroe Islands

- Economic rank, by nominal GDP (2007): 157th (one hundred and fifty seventh)
- Communications in the Faroe Islands
  - Internet in the Faroe Islands
- Companies of the Faroe Islands
- Currency of the Faroe Islands: Króna/Krone
  - ISO 4217: DKK
- Transport in the Faroe Islands
  - Airports in the Faroe Islands
  - Rail transport in the Faroe Islands

== See also ==
- Faroe Islands
- List of international rankings
- Outline of geography
  - Outline of Europe
    - Outline of Denmark
    - Outline of Greenland
