= List of members of the Løgting, 2002–2004 =

A list of members of the Løgting from 2004 to 2008. The Løgting had 32 members this period. The members were elected on 30 April 2002.

== Regular members ==
Name	Party	Area	Remarks
Alfred Olsen	Union Party	Eysturoy	
Andrias Petersen	Social Democratic Party	Eysturoy	
Anfinn Kallsberg	People's Party	Norðoyar	Prime Minister 2002–2004. Jákup Mikkelsen took his seat
Annita á Fríðriksmørk	Republican Party	South Streymoy	Minister in 2003. Finnur Helmsdal took his seat
Bárður á Steig Nielsen	Union Party	North Streymoy	
Bjarni Djurholm	People's Party	South Streymoy	Minister 2002–2004. Poul Michelsen took his seat
Edmund Joensen	Union Party	Eysturoy	Speaker of the Løgting in 2002–2004
Gerhard Lognberg	Social Democratic Party	Sandoy	
Heðin Mortensen	Union Party	South Streymoy	
Heðin Zachariassen	People's Party	North Streymoy	
Heini O. Heinesen	Republican Party	Norðoyar	
Henrik Old	Social Democratic Party	Suðuroy	
Hergeir Nielsen	Republican Party	Suðuroy	
Høgni Hoydal	Republican Party	South Streymoy	Minister 2002–2003. Jógvan Arge took his seat
Jenis av Rana	Centre Party	South Streymoy	
Jóannes Eidesgaard	Social Democratic Party	Suðuroy	
Jógvan á Lakjuni	People's Party	Eysturoy	
Jógvan við Keldu	People's Party	Norðoyar	
Johan Dahl	Union Party	Suðuroy	
Jørgen Niclasen	People's Party	Vágar	Minister 2002–2003. Jóanis Nielsen took his seat
Kaj Leo Johannesen	Union Party	South Streymoy	
Kári P. Højgaard	Self-Government Party	Eysturoy	
Katrin Dahl Jakobsen	Social Democratic Party	South Streymoy	
Kristian Magnussen	Social Democratic Party	South Streymoy	
Kristina Háfoss	Republican Party	South Streymoy	
Lisbeth L. Petersen	Union Party	South Streymoy	
Niklái Petersen	Republican Party	North Streymoy	
Marjus Dam	Union Party	Vágar	
Óli Breckmann	People's Party	South Streymoy	
Páll á Reynatúgvu	Republican Party	Sandoy	Minister 2002–2003. Rúni Hentze took his seat
Tórbjørn Jacobsen	Republican Party	Eysturoy	
Vilhelm Johannesen	Social Democratic Party	Norðoyar	
