= List of members of the Løgting, 1984–1988 =

List of the members of the Faroese Løgting in the period 1984–1988. The parliament had 32 members this period.

== Elected members of the Løgting ==
Name	Party	Electoral district	Comments
Thomas Arabo	Social Democratic Party	Norðurstreymoy	
Óli Breckmann	People's Party	Suðurstreymoy	
Jóannes Dalsgaard	Social Democratic Party	Suðurstreymoy	
Atli Dam	Social Democratic Party	Suðuroy	Prime Minister 1985–1988. Sverre Midjord took his seat.
Jógvan Durhuus	Republic	Norðurstreymoy	Minister 1985–1988
Pauli Ellefsen	Union Party	Suðurstreymoy	Prime Minister 1984–1985
Svend Aage Ellefsen	People's Party	Vágar	
Adolf Hansen	Christian People's Party	Eysturoy	
Heini O. Heinesen	Republic	Norðoyar	
Asbjørn Joensen	Self-Government Party	Norðoyar	
Ivan Johannesen	Union Party	Vágar	
Vilhelm Johannesen	Social Democratic Party	Norðoyar	Minister 1985–1988. Poul J. Olsen took his seat.
Anfinn Kallsberg	People's Party	Norðoyar	Minister 1984–1985
Hilmar Kass	Self-Government Party	Suðurstreymoy	
Karin Kjølbro	Republic	Suðurstreymoy	
Jacob Lindenskov	Social Democratic Party	Suðurstreymoy	Speaker of the Løgting 1984–1987.
Poul Michelsen	People's Party	Suðurstreymoy	
Flemming Mikkelsen	Union Party	Suðuroy	
Tordur Niclasen	Christian People's Party	Suðurstreymoy	
Agnar Nielsen	Union Party	Norðurstreymoy	
Hergeir Nielsen	Republic	Suðuroy	Speaker of the Løgting 1987–1988.
Henrik Old	Social Democratic Party	Suðuroy	
Johannes Martin Olsen	Union Party	Eysturoy	
Jógvan I. Olsen	Union Party	Eysturoy	
Olaf Olsen	People's Party	Eysturoy	
Tórálvur Mohr Olsen	Social Democratic Party	Sandoy	
Erlendur Patursson	Republic	Suðurstreymoy	Died in 1986. Hans Jacob Debes took his seat 1986–1988.
Eilif Samuelsen	Union Party	Suðurstreymoy	Minister 1984–1985.
Jógvan Sundstein	People's Party	Suðurstreymoy	
Jørgen Thomsen	Social Democratic Party	Eysturoy	
Eyðun M. Viderø	People's Party	Sandoy	
