= List of political parties in the Faroe Islands =

The Faroe Islands have a multi-party system, with numerous parties in which no one party often has a chance of gaining power alone, and parties must work with each other to form coalition governments.

There are two major ideological cleavages in Faroese politics. In addition to the left-right spectrum, parties are also divided between those that want to maintain the Faroes' place within the Danish Realm ('unionists') and those that want Faroese independence ('separatists').

Schematic depiction of the political party spectrum in the Faroe Islands

The current government is formed by a coalition between the centre-right People's Party, the centre-right Union Party, and the centre-left Social Democratic Party.

== Political parties with elected representation at a national level ==
There are currently seven parties represented in the Løgting. The largest party represents centre-right separatism with nine seats, while the second-largest party represents centre-right unionism with seven seats. The next two – each with six seats – represent centre-left unionism and left-wing separatism. There are also three minor parties in the Løgting, representing centre-right, right-wing and centrist separatism.

Election symbol	Party	MPs		Ideology	Leader
Election symbol	Party	Løgting (Faroese Parliament)	Folketing (Danish Parliament)	Ideology	Leader
	People's Party; Fólkaflokkurin	9 / 33	0 / 2	Centre-right – conservative and socially conservative. In favour of Faroese independence.	Beinir Johannesen
	Union Party; Sambandsflokkurin	7 / 33	1 / 2	Centre-right – conservative liberal and Nordic agrarian. In favour of union with Denmark.	Bárður á Steig Nielsen
	Social Democratic Party; Javnaðarflokkurin	6 / 33	1 / 2	Centre-left – social democratic. In favour of union with Denmark.	Aksel V. Johannesen
	Republic; Tjóðveldi	6 / 33	0 / 2	Left-wing – democratic socialist. In favour of Faroese independence.	Sirið Stenberg
	Progress; Framsókn	2 / 33	0 / 2	Centre-right – classical liberal. In favour of Faroese independence.	Ruth Vang
	Centre Party; Miðflokkurin	2 / 33	0 / 2	Right-wing – Christian democratic, conservative and anti-LGBT. In favour of Faroese independence.	Jenis av Rana
	Sjálvstýri	1 / 33	0 / 2	Centre – social liberal. In favour of gradual Faroese independence.	Sámal Petur í Grund

== Defunct parties ==
- Advancement for the Islands (Marxist–Leninist) (Oyggjaframi (marx-leninistar))
- Business Party (Vinnuflokkurin)
- Faroese Communist Party (Kommunistiski flokkur Føroya)
- Christian People's Party (Kristiligi fólkaflokkurin), formerly known as the Progress Party (Framburðsflokkurin)
- Faroese Socialists (Føroyskir Sosialistar)
- Faroese Party (Hin føroyski flokkurin)
- Freedom Union (Frælsisfylkingin)
- Funny Party (Hin stuttligi flokkurin)
- Progress Party (Framsóknarflokkurin)
- The Red 1 May Group
- Separatist Party (Loysingarflokkurin)
- Social Separatist Party (Sosialistiski loysingarflokkurin)
- Worker's Union (Verkamannafylkingin)

== See also ==
- Lists of political parties
