= 1906 Faroese general election =

← 1905	18 July 1906	1908 →
Party	Leader	Vote %	Seats
Union	Fríðrikur Petersen	62.40	12
Self-Government	Jóannes Patursson	37.60	8
This lists parties that won seats. See the complete results below.

General elections were held in the Faroe Islands on 18 July 1906. The result was a victory for the Union Party, which won 12 of the 20 seats in the Løgting.

== Electoral system ==
A new electoral system was introduced and the number of elected seats increased from 18 to 20. The Danish administrator (Amtmaður) and the local dean (Próstur) were also members, with the administrator serving as the speaker. Previously voters could cast as many votes as there were seats in their constituency, but were now restricted to a single vote for a party list. The elections were also the first in which the secret ballot was used.

== Results ==
Party	Votes	%	Seats
Union Party	961	62.40	12
Self-Government Party	579	37.60	8
Total	1,540	100.00	20
Source: Election Passport, Løgting
