= 1897 Faroese general election =

Danish territorial election

Partial general elections were held in the Faroe Islands in 1897 to elect nine of the eighteen elected members of the Løgting. The Danish administrator (Amtmaður) and the local dean (Próstur) were also members, with the administrator serving as the speaker.

== Electoral system ==
Members of the Løgting were elected by first-past-the-post voting, with voters having as many votes as there were seats available in their constituency. Nine of the 18 seats were elected every two years. Voting was restricted to men aged 25 or over who met certain tax-paying criteria.

== Results ==
Constituency	Elected members	Notes
Norðoyggjar	Klæmint Olsen	Re-elected
Norðoyggjar	Símun Júst Sørensen	
Sandoy	Jóhan Michael Hentze	Re-elected
Sandoy	Jóhan Hendrik Poulsen	
Suðuroy	Fríðrikur Petersen	Previously elected in Sandoy
Suðuroy	Johan Hendrik Schrøter	Re-elected
Suðurstreymoy	Enok Bærentsen	Re-elected
Suðurstreymoy	Olaf Finsen	Re-elected
Suðurstreymoy	Rasmus Effersøe	
Source: Løgting

== Aftermath ==
Fríðrikur Petersen was appointed as Próstur in 1900 and was replaced by Oliver Effersøe.
