= Cabinet of Beinir Johannesen =

Government of the Faroe Islands (2026-present)

- Cabinet of Faroe Islands
- Date formed: 13 April 2026

People and organisations
- Prime Minister: Beinir Johannesen
- Deputy Prime Minister: Bárður á Steig Nielsen
- Member party: People's Party (A), Union Party (B), Social Democratic Party (C)
- Status in legislature: Majority (coalition)
- Opposition party: Republic (E), Progress (F), Centre Party (H), Self-Government (D)

History
- Election: 26 March 2026
- Predecessor: Cabinet of Aksel V. Johannesen II

The Cabinet of Beinir Johannesen is the current government of the Faroe Islands since 13 April 2026, with Beinir Johannesen of the People's Party as Prime Minister, creating a coalition with the Union Party and the Social Democratic Party.

It is a unique coalition in the modern Faroe Islands political climate, given that it was formed beyond the traditional ideological and bloc lines which have formed in the 21st Century. Notably, the People's Party and Union Party are situated on the political right and the Social Democratic Party is on the left. While the Union Party and the Social Democratic Party naturally lean towards Danish unionism and the biggest People's Party is separatist. Beinir in his inaugural speech as Prime Minister reaffirmed this, saying that “bloc politics, which will work centrally against a single preferred policy or party, is no longer valid in Faroese politics”.

== Composition ==
Cabinet members
Portfolio	Minister	Took office	Left office	Party	Ref
Prime Minister	Beinir Johannesen	13 April 2026	Incumbent	People's	
Deputy Prime Minister, Minister of Foreign Affairs & Minister of Fisheries	Bárður á Steig Nielsen	13 April 2026	Incumbent	Union	
Minister of Finance	Aksel V. Johannesen	13 April 2026	Incumbent	Social Democratic	
Minister of Internal Affairs & Minister of Housing	Margit Stóra	13 April 2026	Incumbent	Social Democratic	
Minister of Health & Minister of Energy	Eyðdis Hartmann Niclasen	13 April 2026	Incumbent	Union	
Minister of Labour	Jacob Vestergaard	13 April 2026	Incumbent	People's	
Minister of Social Affairs and Culture	Bárður á Lakjuni	13 April 2026	Incumbent	People's	

== See also ==
- Cabinet of the Faroe Islands
- List of members of the Løgting, 2026–current
