= List of members of the Løgting, 2004–2008 =

A list of members of the Løgting from 2004 to 2008. The Løgting had 32 members this period. After 2008 the number of members was 33. The election for the Løgting was held on 20 January 2004. Tjóðveldi (Republic) got 8 members elected, Union Party, Social Democratic Party and People's Party got 7 members elected, Centre Party got 2 members and Self-Government Party got one member elected for the Løgting.

Name	Party	Area	Year of birth	Remarks
Alfred Olsen	Union Party	Eysturoy	1947	
Andrias Petersen	Social Democratic Party	Eysturoy	1947	
Anfinn Kallsberg	People's Party	Norðoyar	1947	
Annita á Fríðriksmørk	Republic	Suðurstreymoy	1968	
Bárður á Steig Nielsen	Union Party	Norðurstreymoy	1972	Minister 2004–2007, leave from 2007. Olav Enomoto took his place in the Løgting.
Bill Justinussen	Centre Party	Eysturoy	1963	
Bjarni Djurholm	People's Party	Suðurstreymoy	1957	Minister 2004–2008. Óli Breckmann took his place in the Løgting.
Edmund Joensen	Union Party	Eysturoy	1944	
Finnur Helmsdal	Republic	Suðurstreymoy	1952	
Gerhard Lognberg	Social Democratic Party	Sandoy	1950	
Heðin Zachariasen	People's Party	Norðurstreymoy	1959	Minister 2007–2008. Ingi Olsen took his place in the Løgting.
Heidi Petersen	Republic	Norðurstreymoy	1959	
Hergeir Nielsen	Republic	Suðuroy	1949	
Høgni Hoydal	Republic	Suðurstreymoy	1966	
Jenis av Rana	Centre Party	Suðurstreymoy	1953	
Jóannes Eidesgaard	Social Democratic Party	Suðuroy	1951	Prime Minister (Løgmaður) 2004–2008. Henrik Old took his place in the Løgting.
Johan Dahl	Union Party	Suðuroy	1959	
John Johannessen	Social Democratic Party	Suðurstreymoy	1977	
Jógvan við Keldu	People's Party	Norðoyar	1944	Minister 2004–2005. Jákup Mikkelsen took his place in the Løgting.
Jørgen Niclasen	People's Party	Vágar	1969	
Kaj Leo Johannesen	Union Party	Suðurstreymoy	1964	
Karsten Hansen	Republic	Norðoyar	1944	
Jógvan á Lakjuni	People's Party	Eysturoy	1952	Minister 2004–2008. Kjartan Joensen took his place in the Løgting.
Kári P. Højgaard	Self-Government Party	Eysturoy	1951	
Kristian Magnussen	Social Democratic Party	Suðurstreymoy	1956	
Lisbeth L. Petersen	Union Party	Suðurstreymoy	1939	
Marjus Dam	Union Party	Vágar	1955	
Páll á Reynatúgvu	Republic	Sandoy	1967	
Poul Michelsen	People's Party	Suðurstreymoy	1944	
Sverre Midjord	Social Democratic Party	Suðuroy	1933	
Tórbjørn Jacobsen	Republic	Eysturoy	1955	
Vilhelm Johannesen	Social Democratic Party	Norðoyar	1942	
