= Elections in the Faroe Islands =

The Faroe Islands elects on the national level a legislature. The Faroese Parliament (Løgtingið in Faroese) has 33 members of parliament, elected for a four-year term by proportional representation. The Faroe Islands have a multi-party system (disputing on independence and unionism as well as left and right), with numerous parties in which a single party normally does not have a chance of gaining power alone, and therefore the parties must work together in order to form a coalition government.

== Latest elections ==
The People's Party won the most with 26.8% of the vote, receiving nine seats, three more than the 2022 election. Their vote share was the highest any one party had received since 1990. The Union Party followed in second with 21.5% of the vote, receiving seven seats. In third place were the Social Democrats with 18.9% of the vote and six seats, a decrease in three seats. Republic similarly received six seats after winning 17.4% of the vote. Progress and the Centre Party received two seats each after the former won 6.6% and the latter won 5.3% of the vote. Sjálvstýri won one seat after receiving 3.6% of the vote, returning to the Løgting after losing their mandate in the previous election. The number of women elected to the Løgting was 10, the same amount as the last election. Turnout for the election was 89.5%, 1.4 percentage points higher than the last election.

Party	Votes	%	Seats	+/–
People's Party	9,451	26.75	9	+3
Union Party	7,600	21.51	7	0
Social Democratic Party	6,672	18.88	6	–3
Republic	6,143	17.39	6	0
Progress	2,319	6.56	2	–1
Centre Party	1,866	5.28	2	0
Sjálvstýri	1,284	3.63	1	+1
Total	35,335	100.00	33	0
Valid votes	35,335	99.43		
Invalid votes	57	0.16		
Blank votes	145	0.41		
Total votes	35,537	100.00		
Registered voters/turnout	39,703	89.51		
Source: kvf.fo

== Past elections and referendums ==
- JF – Social-Democrats (Equality Party)
- SF – Union Party (have been in coalition with the Labour Front and the Self-Government Party at some elections)
- TF – Republican Party
- FF – People's Party
- SSF – Self-Government Party
- MF – Centre Party
- KFF – Christian People's Party
- VF – Workers' Movement
- F – Progress

=== 1984 ===
JF – 23.4%, 8 MPs
FF – 21.6%, 7 MPs
SF – 21.2%, 7 MPs
TF – 19.5%, 6 MPs
SSF – 8.5%, 2 MPs
KFF – 5.8%, 2 MPs

=== 1988 ===
FF – 23.2%, 8 MPs
JF – 21.6%, 7 MPs
SF – 21.2%, 7 MPs
TF – 16.2%, 6 MPs
SSF – 7.1%, 2 MPs
KFF – 5.5%, 2 MPs
Others – 2.2%, 0 MPs

=== 1990 ===
JF – 27.5%, 10 MPs
FF – 21.9%, 7 MPs
SF – 18.9%, 6 MPs
TF – 14.7%, 4 MPs
SSF – 8.8%, 3 MPs
KFF – 5.9%, 2 MPs
Others – 2.3%, 0 MPs

=== 1994 ===
SF – 23.4%, 8 MPs
FF – 16.0%, 6 MPs
JF – 15.4%, 5 MPs
TF – 13.7%, 4 MPs
VF – 9.5%, 3 MPs
KFF – 6.3%, 2 MPs
MF – 5.8%, 2 MPs
SSF – 5.6%, 2 MPs
Others – 4.3%, 0 MPs

=== 1998 ===
TF – 23.8%, 8 MPs
JF – 21.9%, 7 MPs
FF – 21.3%, 8 MPs
SF – 18.0%, 6 MPs
SSF – 7.7%, 2 MPs
MF – 4.1%, 1 MPs
KFF – 2.5%, 0 MPs
VF – 0.8%, 0 MPs
Others – 0.8%, 0 MPs

=== 2002 ===
SF – 26.0%, 8 MPs
TF – 23.7%, 8 MPs
JF – 20.9%, 7 MPs
FF – 20.8%, 7 MPs
SSF – 4.4%, 1 MPs
MF – 4.2%, 1 MP

=== 2004 ===
SF – 23.7%, 7 MPs
JF – 21.8%, 7 MPs
TF – 21.7%, 8 MPs
FF – 20.6%, 7 MPs
MF – 5.2%, 2 MPs
SSF – 4.6%, 1 MP

=== 2008 ===
TF – 23.3%, 8 MPs
SF – 21%, 7 MPs
FF – 20.1%, 7 MPs
JF – 19.4%, 6 MPs
MF – 8.4%, 3 MPs
SSF – 7.2%, 2 MPs
Others – 0.7%, 0 MPs

=== 2011 ===
SF – 24.7%, 8 MPs
TF – 23.3%, 8 MPs
FF – 18.3%, 6 MPs
JF – 17.7%, 6 MPs
F – 6.3%, 2 MPs
MF – 6.2%, 2 MPs
SSF – 4.2%, 1 MP

=== 2015 ===
JF – 25.1%, 8 MPs
TF – 20.7%, 7 MPs
FF – 18.9%, 6 MPs
SF – 18.7%, 6 MPs
F – 7.0%, 2 MPs
MF – 5.5%, 2 MPs
SSF – 4.1%, 2 MPs

=== 2019 ===
FF – 24,5%, 8 MPs
JF – 22,1%, 7 MPs
SF – 20,4%, 7 MPs
TF – 18.1%, 6 MPs
MF – 5,4%, 2 MPs
F – 4,6%, 2 MPs
SSF – 3,4%, 1 MPs
Others – 1,4%, 0 MPs

=== 2022 ===
JF – 26,6%, 9 MPs
SF – 20,0%, 7 MPs
FF – 19,0%, 6 MPs
TF – 17,7%, 6 MPs
F – 7,5%, 3 MPs
MF – 6,5%, 2 MPs
SSF – 2,7%, 0 MPs

== See also ==
- Electoral calendar
- Electoral system
