= 1918 Faroese general election =

← 1916	24 April 1918	1920 →
Party	Leader	Vote %	Seats	+/–
Union	Oliver Effersøe	50.26	9	−1
Self-Government	Jóannes Patursson	49.74	11	+2
This lists parties that won seats. See the complete results below.

General elections were held in the Faroe Islands on 24 April 1918, the first in which women had the right to vote. Although the Union Party narrowly received the most votes, the result was a victory for the Self-Government Party, which won 11 of the 20 seats in the Løgting.

== Results ==
Party	Votes	%	Seats	+/–
Union Party	2,969	50.26	9	–1
Self-Government Party	2,938	49.74	11	+2
Total	5,907	100.00	20	0
Source: Løgting
