= Cabinet of Kaj Leo Johannesen I =

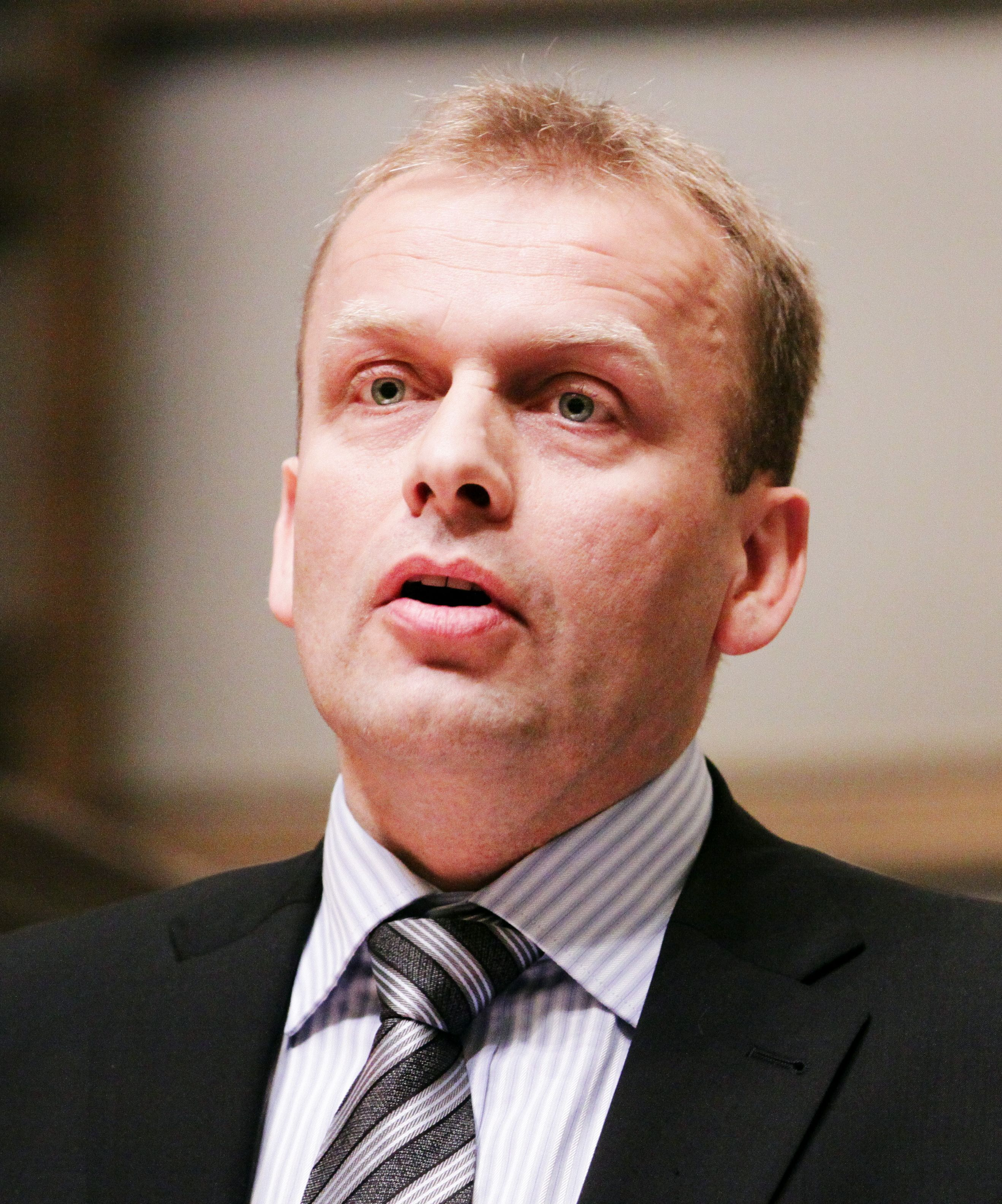
Kay Leo Johannesen

The first cabinet of Kaj Leo Johannesen was the government of the Faroe Islands in the period 26 September 2008 until 14 November 2011. Kaj Leo Johannesen from the Union Party (Sambandsflokkurin) was prime minister, the other parties of the cabinet were the People's Party (Fólkaflokkurin) and the Social Democratic Party (Javnaðarflokkurin). On 6 April 2011 however the prime minister ended the coalition with the People's Party, who left the government after disagreements about the financial politics, and the two remaining parties formed the first minority government in the Faroese history.

On 4 May 2011 the government was reorganized, the prime minister took responsibility for the foreign affairs, the Foreign Ministry was closed, the minister of industry took over the fisheries affairs, the health minister took over internal affairs, except for affairs regarding the municipalities, and the minister of cultural affairs took over affairs regarding the municipalities.

	Minister	Party	From	Until
Prime Minister	Kaj Leo Johannesen	SB	26 September 2008	14 November 2011
Deputy Prime Minister	Aksel V. Johannesen	JF	6 April 2011	14 November 2011
	Jacob Vestergaard	FF	19 January 2011	6 April 2011
	Jørgen Niclasen	FF	26 September 2008	19 January 2011
Ministry	Minister	Party	From	Until
Foreign Ministry	Jacob Vestergaard	FF	19 January 2011	6 April 2011
	Jørgen Niclasen	FF	26 September 2008	19 January 2011
Ministry of Finance	Aksel V. Johannesen	JF	21 February 2011	14 November 2011
	Jóannes Eidesgaard	JF	26 September 2008	21 February 2011
Ministry of Health	John Johannessen	JF	21 February 2011	14 November 2011
	Aksel V. Johannesen	JF	16 July 2009	21 February 2011
	Hans Pauli Strøm	JF	26 September 2008	13 July 2009
Ministry of Culture	Helena Dam á Neystabø	JF	26 September 2008	14 November 2011
Ministry of Trade and Industry	Johan Dahl	SB	26 September 2008	14 November 2011
Ministry of Fisheries	Johan Dahl	SB	4 May 2011	14 November 2011
	Jacob Vestergaard	FF	26. September 2008	6 April 2011
Ministry of Social Affairs	Rósa Samuelsen	SB	26 September 2008	14 November 2011
Ministry of Internal Affairs	John Johannessen	JF	4 May 2011	14 November 2011
	Annika Olsen	FF	26 September 2008	6 April 2011

== See also ==
- Cabinet of the Faroe Islands
