= 1950 Faroese general election =

Election in the Faroe Islands

- 8 November 1950
Party	Leader	Vote %	Seats	+/–
People's	Thorstein Petersen	32.25	8	0
Union	Johan Poulsen	27.26	7	+1
Social Democratic	Peter Mohr Dam	22.40	6	+2
Republic	Erlendur Patursson	9.85	2	New
Self-Government	Louis Zachariasen	8.23	2	0
This lists parties that won seats. See the complete results below.
Prime Minister before	Prime Minister after
Andrass Samuelsen; Union	Kristian Djurhuus; Union

General elections were held in the Faroe Islands on 8 November 1950, the first after the granting of home rule two years earlier. The People's Party remained the largest party in the Løgting, winning 8 of the 25 seats.

== Results ==
Party	Votes	%	Seats	+/–
People's Party	3,750	32.25	8	0
Union Party	3,170	27.26	7	+1
Social Democratic Party	2,605	22.40	6	+2
Republican Party	1,145	9.85	2	New
Self-Government Party	957	8.23	2	0
Total	11,627	100.00	25	+5
Source: Election Passport
