= Coat of arms of the Faroe Islands =

- Armiger: Faroe Islands
- Adopted: 1 April 2004; 21 years ago
- Shield: Azure, a ram argent, langued gules, armed and unguled or.

The coat of arms of the Faroe Islands first appears on one of the medieval chairs in Kirkjubøur from around the 15th century. It depicts a silver ram (Faroese: Veðrur) passant with golden hooves and horns on an azure shield. Later uses show a ram in a seal used by the Løgrættumenn, members of the Old Faroese law Court, the Løgting.

When the Løgting was abolished in 1816, the coat of arms went out of use, not appearing even after the Løgting was reestablished in 1852 and the Faroe Islands were effectively outside direct Danish rule during the British occupation in World War II.

In 1948, the coat of arms came into use again after the Home Rule Act came into force, not by the Løgting (Parliament) but by the Landsstýri (Government). The old title Løgmaður had been reestablished, but this time as the leader of the government, and the coat of arms followed him.

On 1 April 2004, the Prime Minister's Office announced that from then on that it would use a new version of the coat of arms. This new interpretation was based on the original found depicted on the chairs from Kirkjubøur. The colours were inspired from the Faroese flag Merkið, and golden yellow was added. The new coat of arms depicts a ram on a blue shield ready to defend. It can be used by Cabinet Ministries and by official Faroese representatives, though some still use the old symbol.

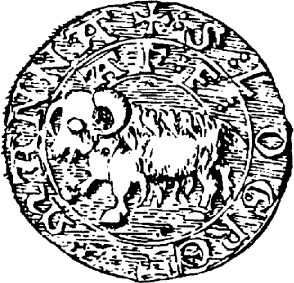
Old seal from 1533.

Former government seal (or emblem)

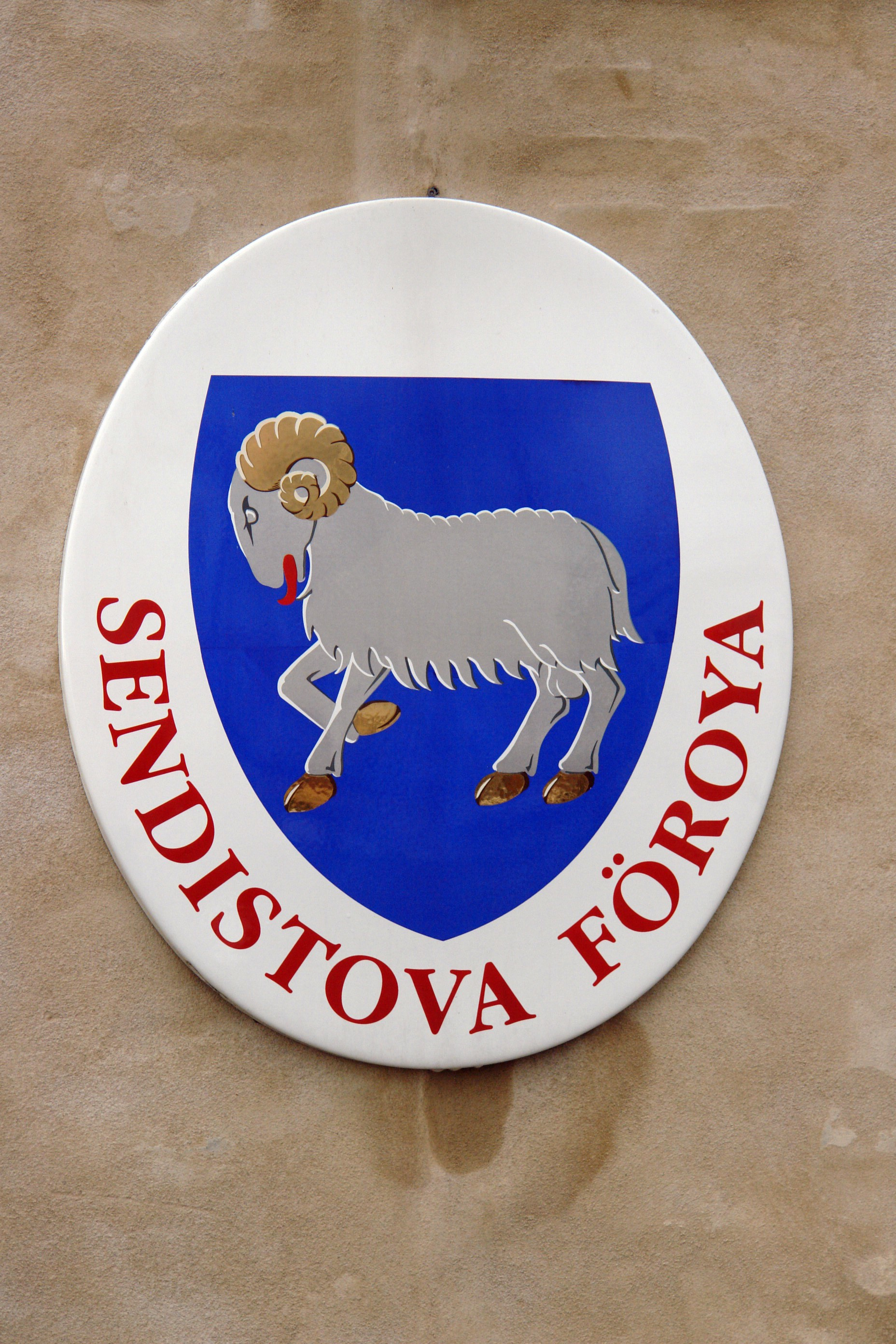
Coat of arms at The Representation of the Faroe Islands in Copenhagen
