= 1954 Faroese general election =

Danish territorial election

- 8 November 1954
Party	Leader	Vote %	Seats	+/–
Union	Johan Poulsen	25.98	7	0
Republic	Erlendur Patursson	23.75	6	+4
People's	Hákun Djurhuus	20.86	6	−2
Social Democratic	Peter Mohr Dam	19.75	5	−1
Self-Government	Louis Zachariasen	7.12	2	0
Independent	–	2.53	1	New
This lists parties that won seats. See the complete results below.
Prime Minister before	Prime Minister after
Kristian Djurhuus; Union	Kristian Djurhuus; Union

General elections were held in the Faroe Islands on 8 November 1954. The Union Party emerged as the largest party in the Løgting, winning 7 of the 27 seats.

== Results ==
Party	Votes	%	Seats	+/–
Union Party	3,312	25.98	7	0
Republican Party	3,028	23.75	6	+4
People's Party	2,660	20.86	6	–2
Social Democratic Party	2,518	19.75	5	–1
Self-Government Party	908	7.12	2	0
Independents	323	2.53	1	New
Total	12,749	100.00	27	+2
Source: Election Passport (votes)
