= 1908 Faroese general election =

Danish territorial election

- 2 February 1908
Party	Leader	Vote %	Seats	+/–
Union	Fríðrikur Petersen	66.10	13	+1
Self-Government	Jóannes Patursson	33.90	7	−1
This lists parties that won seats. See the complete results below.

Partial general elections were held in the southern part of the Faroe Islands on 2 February 1908. The Union Party remained the largest in the Løgting, with 13 of the 20 seats.

== Results ==
Party	Votes	%	Seats		
Party	Votes	%	Won	Total	+/–
Union Party	663	66.10	7	13	+1
Self-Government Party	340	33.90	3	7	–1
Total	1,003	100.00	10	20	0
Source: Løgting
