= 1936 Faroese general election =

Danish territorial election

- 28 January 1936
Party	Leader	Vote %	Seats	+/–
Self-Government	Jóannes Patursson	34.19	8	0
Union	Andrass Samuelsen	33.68	8	−3
Social Democratic	Maurentius Viðstein	24.00	6	+4
Business	Thorstein Petersen	8.13	2	New
This lists parties that won seats. See the complete results below.

General elections were held in the Faroe Islands on 28 January 1936. The Union Party and the Self-Government Party emerged as the joint-largest parties in the Løgting, both winning 8 of the 24 seats.

== Results ==
Party	Votes	%	Seats	+/–
Self-Government Party	2,694	34.19	8	0
Union Party	2,654	33.68	8	–3
Social Democratic Party	1,891	24.00	6	+4
Business Party	641	8.13	2	New
Total	7,880	100.00	24	+3
Source: Election Passport (votes)
