= 1946 Faroese general election =

- 8 November 1946
Party	Leader	Vote %	Seats	+/–
People's	Thorstein Petersen	40.92	8	−3
Union	Andrass Samuelsen	28.69	6	0
JF–S	Peter Mohr Dam	28.10	6	0
This lists parties that won seats. See the complete results below.

Early general elections were held in the Faroe Islands on 8 November 1946. The elections were called after King Christian X dissolved the Løgting following the contentious aftermath of the Faroese independence referendum held in September. The People's Party remained the largest party in the Løgting, winning 8 of the 20 seats. They were the last elections held before the Faroe Islands were granted home rule on 30 March 1948.

== Results ==
Party	Votes	%	Seats	+/–
People's Party	5,396	40.92	8	–3
Union Party	3,783	28.69	6	0
Social Democratic–Self-Government	3,705	28.10	6	0
Independents	302	2.29	0	New
Total	13,186	100.00	20	–3
Source: Election Passport, Stjørnarskipanarmálið 1946
