= 1932 Faroese general election =

Danish territorial election

- 19 January 1932
| Party | Leader | Vote % | Seats | +/– |
|---|---|---|---|---|
| Union | Andrass Samuelsen | 50.15 | 11 | +1 |
| Self-Government | Jóannes Patursson | 37.33 | 8 | −3 |
| Social Democratic | Maurentius Viðstein | 10.51 | 2 | 0 |
This lists parties that won seats. See the complete results below.

General elections were held in the Faroe Islands on 19 January 1932. The Union Party emerged as the largest in the Løgting, winning 11 of the 21 seats.

== Results ==
| Party | Votes | % | Seats | +/– |
|---|---|---|---|---|
| Union Party | 3,936 | 50.15 | 11 | +1 |
| Self-Government Party | 2,931 | 37.34 | 8 | –3 |
| Social Democratic Party | 825 | 10.51 | 2 | 0 |
| Separatist Party | 14 | 0.18 | 0 | New |
| Independents | 143 | 1.82 | 0 | 0 |
| Total | 7,849 | 100.00 | 21 | –2 |
Source: Election Passport (votes)
