= 1914 Faroese general election =

Danish territorial election

- 2 February 1914
Party	Leader	Vote %	Seats	+/–
Union	Fríðrikur Petersen	52.79	12	−1
Self-Government	Jóannes Patursson	47.21	8	+1
This lists parties that won seats. See the complete results below.

Partial general elections were held in the southern part of the Faroe Islands on 2 February 1914. The Union Party remained the largest in the Løgting, with 12 of the 20 seats.

== Results ==
Party	Votes	%	Seats		
Party	Votes	%	Won	Total	+/–
Union Party	699	52.79	6	12	–1
Self-Government Party	625	47.21	4	8	+1
Total	1,324	100.00	10	20	0
Source: Løgting
