= Sámal Petur í Grund =

Faroese politician

- Born: 26 July 1958 (age 68); Syðrugøta

Sámal Petur Martinsson í Grund (born 26 July 1958 in Syðrugøta) is a Faroese politician for the Independence Party. For the parliamentary elections in 2011 and 2015 he ran on the list of Framsókn, but in 2019 he returned to his roots.

== Background ==
He graduated from high school in 1975 and was trained as an electromechanic from 1980 and a skipper in 1994. He was a mechanic aboard factory trawlers from 1979 to 1985, worked as a missionary among seafarers in Denmark and the Faroe Islands from 1986 to 1991, was a sailor from 1992 to 1993 and a mate and skipper on domestic ferries in the Faroe Islands from 2002 to 2008.

== Political career ==
He was Minister of Communications, Culture, Tourism and Fisheries in Edmund Joensen's first and second governments from 10 September 1994 to 1 December 1997. He was dismissed for his handling of the case of the proposed Vágar Tunnel . Sámal Petur í Grund threatened to go to the opposition to get support for his proposal of 40 million kroner for the project, something Joensen had considered economically unsound.

Sámal Petur í Grund was elected to the Løgting on a supplementary mandate from Eysturoy 1998–2002. Here he became the group leader of the party, whose parliamentary group consisted only of himself and Minister of Social Affairs and Health Helena Dam á Neystabø's deputy Jákup Sverri Kass. Sámal Petur í Grund was chairman of the Lagting's Justice Committee from 1998 to 2001 and a member of the Lagting's delegation to the West Nordic Council from 1998 to2000.

Sámal Petur í Grund became Minister of Social Affairs and Health after Helena Dam á Neystabø in Anfinn Kallsberg's first government in February 2001. In Anfinn Kallsberg's second government, appointed in 2002, the tasks of the Ministry of Social Affairs and Health were divided between the Ministry of Social Affairs and the Ministry of Family and Health, without Sámal Petur í Grund becoming a minister in either of them. He was replaced by Minister of Petroleum and Environment Eyðun Elttør as the Sjálvstýrisflokkurin representative in the government.

Helena Dam á Neystabø broke with the party group in November 2001, after losing the battle for the party chairmanship to Sámal Petur í Grund. However, he resigned from the chairmanship just two weeks later to end the dispute with Helena Dam á Neystabø, and deputy chairman Eyðun Elttør took over. The dispute between the two ended with Helena Dam á Neystabø finally joining the Social Democratic Party in February 2002. Sámal Petur Grund played no prominent political role in the following years.

Sámal Petur í Grund came in fourth place out of Sjálvstýrisflokkurin's 17 candidates in the 2008 Faroese general election with 194 personal votes, and thus became the 2nd deputy to the Lagting 2008–2012. Before the election, he defined tax, traffic, labor and business policy as his heart's desires. He appeared in the Lagting in the spring of 2009, when Kári á Rógvi wrote his doctoral dissertation. From 2011 to 2015, Sámal Petur í Grund was a deputy to the Lagting for the liberal and separatist party Framsókn. He ran in the 2015 parliamentary election, but was not elected.

He led Sjálvstýri into the 2026 Faroese general election. He was elected.

== Literature ==
- Løgtingið 150 – Hátíðarrit, bind 2 (2002), s. 280. (PDF)
