= 1943 Faroese general election =

Danish territorial election

- 24 August 1943
| Party | Leader | Vote % | Seats | +/– |
|---|---|---|---|---|
| People's | Jóannes Patursson | 41.49 | 12 | +6 |
| Union | Andrass Samuelsen | 28.31 | 8 | 0 |
| Social Democratic | Peter Mohr Dam | 19.85 | 5 | −1 |
This lists parties that won seats. See the complete results below.

General elections were held in the Faroe Islands on 24 August 1943. The People's Party emerged as the largest party in the Løgting, winning 12 of the 25 seats.

== Results ==
| Party | Votes | % | Seats | +/– |
|---|---|---|---|---|
| People's Party | 4,010 | 41.49 | 12 | +6 |
| Union Party | 2,736 | 28.31 | 8 | 0 |
| Social Democratic Party | 1,919 | 19.85 | 5 | –1 |
| Self-Government Party | 1,001 | 10.36 | 0 | –4 |
| Total | 9,666 | 100.00 | 25 | +1 |
Source: Election Passport, Stjørnarskipanarmálið 1946
