= 1910 Faroese general election =

Danish territorial election

- 12 February 1910
Party	Leader	Vote %	Seats	+/–
Union	Fríðrikur Petersen	72.29	13	0
Self-Government Party	Jóannes Patursson	24.27	7	0
This lists parties that won seats. See the complete results below.

Partial general elections were held in the northern part of the Faroe Islands on 12 February 1910. The Union Party remained the largest in the Løgting, with 13 of the 20 seats.

== Results ==
Party	Votes	%	Seats		
Party	Votes	%	Won	Total	+/–
Union Party	861	72.29	7	13	0
Self-Government Party	289	24.27	3	7	0
Independents	41	3.44	0	0	New
Total	1,191	100.00	10	20	0
Source: Løgting
