= Business Party (Faroe Islands) =

Defunct political party in the Faroe Islands

The Business Party (Faroese: Vinnuflokkurin) was a political party in the Faroe Islands in the 1930s.

== History ==
The party was founded by bank director Thorstein Petersen in 1935. In the 1936 elections for the Løgting the party received 8% of the vote, winning two seats, neither of which were taken by Petersen. In the Danish elections in 1939 it received 9% of the Faroese vote, but failed to win a seat in the Folketing.

The party merged with defectors from the Self-Government Party to form the People's Party, with its founding meeting taking place on 2 January 1940.
