= 1945 Faroese general election =

Danish territorial election

- 6 November 1945
| Party | Leader | Vote % | Seats | +/– |
|---|---|---|---|---|
| People's | Jóannes Patursson | 43.41 | 11 | −1 |
| Union | Andrass Samuelsen | 24.33 | 6 | −2 |
| Social Democratic | Peter Mohr Dam | 22.87 | 6 | +1 |
This lists parties that won seats. See the complete results below.

General elections were held in the Faroe Islands on 6 November 1945. The People's Party remained the largest in the Løgting, winning 11 of the 23 seats.

== Results ==
| Party | Votes | % | Seats | +/– |
|---|---|---|---|---|
| People's Party | 5,708 | 43.41 | 11 | –1 |
| Union Party | 3,199 | 24.33 | 6 | –2 |
| Social Democratic Party | 3,007 | 22.87 | 6 | +1 |
| Self-Government Party | 1,235 | 9.39 | 0 | 0 |
| Total | 13,149 | 100.00 | 23 | –2 |
Source: Stjørnarskipanarmálið 1946
