= 1940 Faroese general election =

Danish territorial election

- 30 January 1940
Party	Leader	Vote %	Seats	+/–
Union	Andrass Samuelsen	32.29	8	0
People's	Jóannes Patursson	24.72	6	New
Social Democratic	Peter Mohr Dam	23.86	6	0
Self-Government	Louis Zachariasen	16.19	4	−4
This lists parties that won seats. See the complete results below.

General elections were held in the Faroe Islands on 30 January 1940. The Union Party emerged as the largest party in the Løgting, winning 8 of the 24 seats.

== Results ==
Party	Votes	%	Seats	+/–
Union Party	2,722	32.29	8	0
People's Party	2,084	24.72	6	New
Social Democratic Party	2,012	23.86	6	0
Self-Government Party	1,365	16.19	4	–4
Separatist Party	139	1.65	0	New
Independents	109	1.29	0	New
Total	8,431	100.00	24	0
Source: Election Passport (votes)
