= 1928 Faroese general election =

Danish territorial election

- 23 January 1928
Party	Leader	Vote %	Seats	+/–
Union	Andrass Samuelsen	46.07	10	−3
Self-Government	Jóannes Patursson	42.32	11	+1
Social Democratic	Maurentius Viðstein	10.60	2	New
This lists parties that won seats. See the complete results below.

General elections were held in the Faroe Islands on 23 January 1928. The Self-Government Party emerged as the largest in the Løgting, winning 11 of the 23 seats.

== Results ==
Party	Votes	%	Seats	+/–
Union Party	2,917	46.07	10	–3
Self-Government Party	2,680	42.32	11	+1
Social Democratic Party	671	10.60	2	New
Independents	64	1.01	0	0
Total	6,332	100.00	23	0
Source: Election Passport (votes)
