= 2019 Faroese general election =

Danish territorial election

- 31 August 2019
- All 33 members in the Løgting; 17 seats needed for a majority
- Turnout: 89.70%
Party	Leader	Vote %	Seats	+/–
People's	Jørgen Niclasen	24.54	8	+2
Social Democratic	Aksel V. Johannesen	22.14	7	−1
Union	Bárður á Steig Nielsen	20.35	7	+1
Republic	Høgni Hoydal	18.14	6	−1
Centre	Jenis av Rana	5.37	2	0
Progress	Poul Michelsen	4.62	2	0
New Self-Government	Jógvan Skorheim	3.43	1	−1
This lists parties that won seats. See the complete results below.
Map of the election, showing the largest party in each polling area.
Prime Minister before	Prime Minister
Aksel V. Johannesen; Social Democratic	Bárður á Steig Nielsen; Union

General elections were held in the Faroe Islands on 31 August 2019. The elections resulted in the defeat of Aksel V. Johannesen's coalition government consisting of the Social Democrats, Republic, and Progress. Following the elections, a new coalition government was formed by Union Party leader Bárður á Steig Nielsen, consisting of the Union Party, the People's Party and the Centre Party, which won 17 of the 33 seats.

According to political scientist Lise Lyck, the main election issues were public finances (welfare, taxes and public coffers), recent reforms of the fishing sector and same-sex marriage.

== Electoral system ==
The 33 members of the Løgting were elected by open list proportional representation in a single nationwide constituency with an electoral threshold of 1/33 of votes (~3.03%). Seats were allocated using the d'Hondt method.

== Results ==
Party	Votes	%	Seats	+/–
People's Party	8,290	24.54	8	+2
Social Democratic Party	7,480	22.14	7	–1
Union Party	6,874	20.35	7	+1
Republic	6,127	18.14	6	–1
Centre Party	1,815	5.37	2	0
Progress	1,559	4.62	2	0
Self-Government	1,157	3.43	1	–1
Cannabis Initiative	310	0.92	0	New
Faroese Party	167	0.49	0	New
Total	33,779	100.00	33	0
Valid votes	33,779	99.56		
Invalid votes	65	0.19		
Blank votes	85	0.25		
Total votes	33,929	100.00		
Registered voters/turnout	37,827	89.70		
Source: KVF
