= 1912 Faroese general election =

Danish territorial election

- 2 February 1912
Party	Leader	Vote %	Seats	+/–
Union	Fríðrikur Petersen	52.34	13	0
Self-Government	Jóannes Patursson	41.62	7	0
This lists parties that won seats. See the complete results below.

Partial general elections were held in the southern part of the Faroe Islands on 2 February 1912. The Union Party remained the largest in the Løgting, with 13 of the 20 seats.

== Results ==
Party	Votes	%	Seats		
Party	Votes	%	Won	Total	+/–
Union Party	459	52.34	6	13	0
Self-Government Party	365	41.62	4	7	0
Independents	53	6.04	0	0	0
Total	877	100.00	10	20	0
Source: Løgting
