= 1916 Faroese general election =

Danish territorial election

- 28 February 1916
Party	Leader	Vote %	Seats	+/–
Self-Government	Jóannes Patursson	51.72	9	+1
Union	Fríðrikur Petersen	37.88	10	−2
Independents	A.C. Evensen	10.40	1	New
This lists parties that won seats. See the complete results below.

Partial general elections were held in the southern part of the Faroe Islands on 28 February 1916. Although the Self-Government Party won five of the ten seats up for election, the Union Party remained the largest in the Løgting with 10 of the 20 seats.

== Results ==
Party	Votes	%	Seats		
Party	Votes	%	Won	Total	+/–
Self-Government Party	542	51.72	5	9	+1
Union Party	397	37.88	4	10	–2
Independents	109	10.40	1	1	New
Total	1,048	100.00	10	20	0
Source: Løgting
