= Kristian Djurhuus =

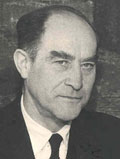

Prime Minister of the Faroe Islands
- In office 19 November 1968 – 12 December 1970
- Monarch: Frederik IX
- Preceded by: Peter Mohr Dam
- Succeeded by: Atli Dam
- In office 15 December 1950 – 8 January 1959
- Monarch: Frederik IX
- Preceded by: Andrass Samuelsen
- Succeeded by: Peter Mohr Dam

Personal details
- Born: 12 February 1895 Tórshavn, Streymoy, Faroe Islands
- Died: 20 November 1984 (aged 89) Tvøroyri, Suðuroy, Faroe Islands
- Party: Sambandsflokkurin

Kristian Djurhuus (12 February 1895 – 20 November 1984) was a Faroese politician. He was a member of the Union Party.

== Biography ==
Kristian Djurhuus was the son of Elin (born Larsen) from Porkeri and Hans Andreas Djurhuus (master carpenter from Tórshavn).

He was the chairman of the town council of Froðba from 1926 to 1930 and was a regular member from 1930 to 1934. He was a member of the Løgting from 1932 to 1962 and from 1966 to 1970 and was its speaker during the British occupation of the Faroe Islands in World War II.

He was a minister in the Faroese government from 1948 to 1950, 1959 to 1963 and 1967 to 1968. He was Prime Minister of the Faroe Islands from 1950 to 1958 and from 1968 to 1970.

The biggest crisis during Djurhuus tenure was the doctors' disputes of Klaksvík (1952–1956) which resulted in an attack on Djurhuus on November 20, 1955 when an unknown gunman shot at his house. Djurhuus was not injured.

Political offices
Preceded by Andrass Samuelsen	Prime Minister of the Faroe Islands; 1950-1959	Succeeded by Peter Mohr Dam
Preceded by Peter Mohr Dam	Prime Minister of the Faroe Islands; 1968-1970	Succeeded by Atli Dam
