= 1924 Faroese general election =

Danish territorial election

- 22 January 1924
Party	Leader	Vote %	Seats	+/–
Union	Oliver Effersøe	58.68	13	+3
Self-Government	Jóannes Patursson	39.11	10	0
This lists parties that won seats. See the complete results below.

General elections were held in the Faroe Islands on 22 January 1924. The result was a victory for the Union Party, which won 13 of the 23 seats in the Løgting.

== Results ==
Party	Votes	%	Seats	+/–
Union Party	3,676	58.68	13	+3
Self-Government Party	2,450	39.11	10	0
Independents	139	2.22	0	New
Total	6,265	100.00	23	+3
Source: Løgting
