= Languages of the Faroe Islands =

Languages of Faroe Islands
- Official: Faroese, Danish
- Foreign: Danish, English and German
- Signed: Faroese Sign Language
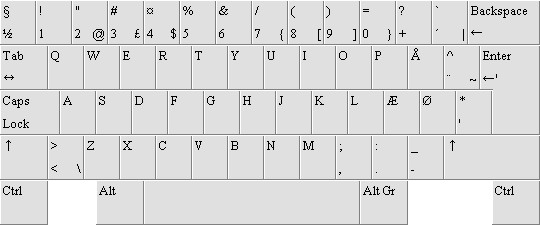
- Keyboard layout: Danish QWERTY

The national language of the Faroe Islands is Faroese. The Faroese language is a Germanic language which is descended from Old Norse. Danish is the official second language.

Faroese is similar in grammar to Icelandic and Old Norse, but closer in pronunciation to Norwegian. In the twentieth century Faroese became the official language and, because the Faroe Islands are a self-governing territory within the Kingdom of Denmark, Danish is taught in Faroese schools.

== Historically ==
20 most used first languages in the Faroe Islands (2014)
Faroese	45,361 (90.8%)
Danish	1,546 (3.1%)
Icelandic	201 (0.4%)
English	190 (0.3%)
Filipino	103 (0.2%)
Norwegian	99 (0.2%)
Thai	86 (0.1%)
Romanian	67 (0.1%)
Greenlandic	62 (0.1%)
Serbian	57 (0.1%)
Russian	55 (0.1%)
Spanish	49 (0.1%)
Swedish	45 (0.09%)
Polish	40 (0.08%)
Chinese	29 (0.06%)
Croatian	25
Portuguese	19
French	18
German	17
Dutch	13
Catalan	11

The first recorded settlers of the Faroe Islands were Irish monks (papar), so it is possible to assume, that one of the first languages in the islands was some form of Old Irish. Neighbouring Shetland was inhabited from the Stone Age, and was Pictish speaking when the Norse arrived.

Norse settlers arrived in the middle of the 9th century, bringing their West Norse language (from which the Faroese language evolved).

Other groups are known to have lived in the Faroes as well. These include Norwegian peoples, and this is evident in certain Faroese places names, such as Signabøur (Bø of 'Sygnir') and Øravík (bay of 'Hörðir'). People from Suðuroy also refer to 'Frísarnir í Akrabergi' (The Frisians of Akraberg).

English and German are sometimes used for the purposes of tourism. Norwegian is occasionally heard too, due to the islands' geographical proximity to Norway.
