= List of speakers of the Løgting of the Faroe Islands =

List of speakers of the Løgting of the Faroe Islands. Speaker is the presiding office in Løgting.

Below is a list of office-holders:

| Name | Portrait | Entered office | Left office | Party |
|---|---|---|---|---|
| Amtmaður of the Faroes (The Governor) | | 1852 | 1923 | |
| Oliver Effersøe | | 1924 | 1928 | Union |
| Edward Mitens | | 1928 | 1930 | Self-Government |
| Oliver Effersøe | | 1930 | 1932 | Union |
| Johan Poulsen | | 1932 | 1936 | Union |
| Edward Mitens | | 1936 | 1940 | Self-Government |
| Johan H. Danbjørg | | 1940 | 1943 | Social Democratic |
| Thorstein Petersen | | 1943 | 1945 | People's |
| Kristian Djurhuus | | 1945 | 1945 | Union |
| Thorstein Petersen | | 1945 | 1946 | People's |
| Jákup Frederik Øregaard | | 1946 | 1950 | Social Democratic |
| Thorstein Petersen | | 1950 | 1950 | People's |
| Hákun Djurhuus | | 1950 | 1951 | People's |
| Johan Poulsen | | 1951 | 1958 | Union |
| Jákup Frederik Øregaard | | 1958 | 1963 | Social Democratic |
| Sámal Petersen | | 1963 | 1966 | Self-Government |
| Jákup Frederik Øregaard | | 1966 | 1978 | Social Democratic |
| Agnar Nielsen | | 1978 | 1979 | Union |
| Hilmar Bech | | 1979 | 1980 | Social Democratic |
| Jógvan Sundstein | | 1980 | 1984 | People's |
| Jacob Lindenskov | | 1984 | 1987 | Social Democratic |
| Hergeir Nielsen | | 1987 | 1988 | Republic |
| Jógvan Sundstein | | 1988 | 1989 | People's |
| Hergeir Nielsen | | 1989 | 1990 | Republic |
| Jørgin Thomsen | | 1990 | 1991 | Social Democratic |
| Anfinn Kallsberg | | 1991 | 1993 | People's |
| Lasse Klein | | 1993 | 1994 | Social Democratic |
| Jógvan Ingvard Olsen | | 1994 | 1994 | Union |
| Marita Petersen | | 1994 | 1995 | Social Democratic |
| Jógvan Ingvard Olsen | | 1995 | 1998 | Union |
| Finnbogi Ísakson | | 1998 | 2002 | Republic |
| Edmund Joensen | | 2002 | 2008 | Union |
| Hergeir Nielsen | | 2008 | 2011 | Republic |
| Jógvan á Lakjuni | | 2011 | 2015 | People's |
| Páll á Reynatúgvu | | 2015 | 2019 | Republic |
| Jógvan á Lakjuni | | 2019 | 2022 | People's |
| Bjørt Samuelsen | | 2022 | 2026 | Republic |
| Johan Dahl | | 2026 | present | Union |

== See also ==
- Politics of the Faroe Islands
