= 1946 Faroese independence referendum =

- 14 September 1946
- Do you want the Faroe Islands to separate from Denmark?
- Outcome: Narrow majority (1.4%) for independence; Result declared invalid by Denmark; Devolution via Home Rule Act (1948)

Results
Choice	Votes	%
Independence	5,660	50.72%
Union with Denmark	5,499	49.28%
Valid votes	11,159	95.87%
Invalid or blank votes	481	4.13%
Total votes	11,640	100.00%
Registered voters/turnout	17,216	67.61%
- Results by island Union Independence

An independence referendum was held in the Faroe Islands, an autonomous territory of the Kingdom of Denmark, on 14 September 1946. Although a narrow majority of valid votes were cast in favour of the proposal (50.7%), the number of invalid votes exceeded the winning margin. Although independence was declared by the Speaker of the Løgting on 18 September 1946, the declaration was not recognised by Denmark. King Christian X of Denmark dissolved the Løgting and called fresh elections, which were won by unionist parties. The islands were subsequently given a greater level of self-rule.

== Results ==
Choice	Votes	%
For	5,660	50.72
Against	5,499	49.28
Total	11,159	100.00
Valid votes	11,159	95.87
Invalid/blank votes	481	4.13
Total votes	11,640	100.00
Registered voters/turnout	17,216	67.61
Source: Direct Democracy

=== By island ===
Island	Independence		Continued Union		Invalid/ blank	Total	Registered voters	Turnout
Island	Votes	%	Votes	%	Invalid/ blank	Total	Registered voters	Turnout
Norðoyar	956	70.6	398	29.4	64	1,418	2,220	63.9
Eysturoy	1,052	43.3	1,376	56.7	99	2,527	3,854	65.6
Norðurstreymoy	622	53.4	543	46.6	42	1,207	1,679	71.9
Vágar	614	58.6	434	41.4	38	1,086	1,485	73.1
Suðurstreymoy	1,308	66.0	674	34.0	145	2,127	3,323	64.0
Sandoy	465	61.9	286	38.1	32	783	1,053	74.4
Suðuroy	643	26.5	1,788	73.5	61	2,492	3,602	69.2
Total	5,660	50.7	5,499	49.3	481	11,640	17,216	67.6

== Aftermath ==
The result – without taking the invalid votes into regard – was 50.7% in favour of full independence to 49.3% in favour of home rule within Denmark.

The chairman of the Løgting subsequently declared independence on 18 September 1946, but this was not recognised either by a majority of the Løgting or the Danish parliament and government. King Christian X of Denmark dissolved the Løgting on 24 September and called for new elections. The dissolution of the Løgting was on 8 November followed by the Faroese parliamentary election of 1946 in which the parties in favour of full independence received a total of 5,396 votes while the parties against received a total of 7,488 votes. New negotiations followed, and Denmark granted the Faroe Islands home-rule on 30 March 1948.

== See also ==
- Faroese independence movement
- Faroese language conflict
