= Johan Dahl =

Faroese politician (born 1959)

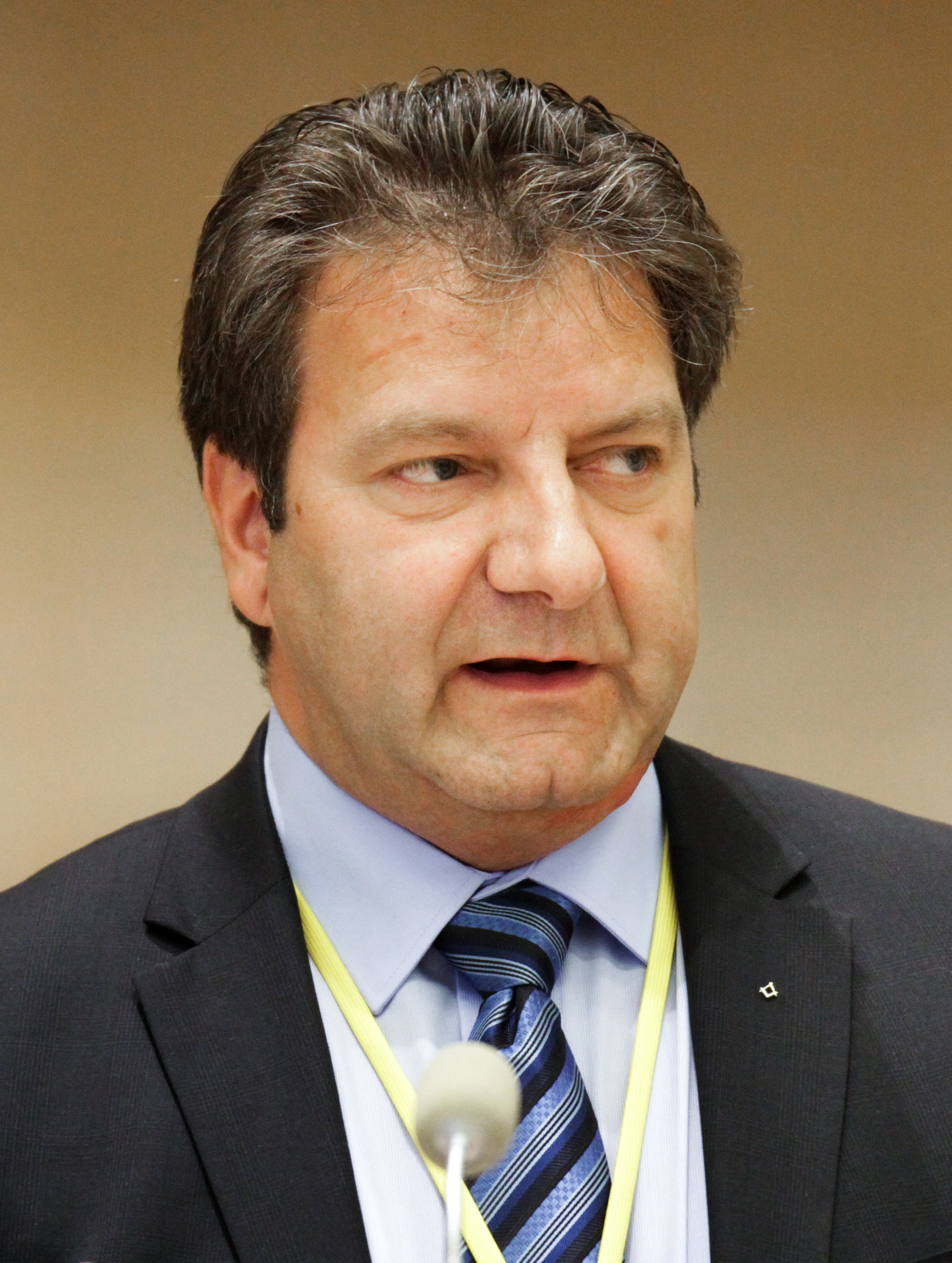
- Dahl in 2009

Speaker of the Løgting
- Incumbent
- Assumed office 13 April 2026
- Preceded by: Bjørt Samuelsen

Personal details
- Born: 19 September 1959 (age 66)
- Party: Union Party

Johan Dahl (born 19 September 1959) is a Faroese politician currently in the Løgting.
