= Beinir Johannesen =

Faroese politician (born 1997)

- Johannesen in 2026 in Greenland

Prime Minister of the Faroe Islands
- Incumbent
- Assumed office 13 April 2026
- Monarch: Frederik X
- Deputy: Bárður á Steig Nielsen
- Preceded by: Aksel V. Johannesen

Leader of the People's Party
- Incumbent
- Assumed office 10 November 2022
- Preceded by: Christian Andreasen

Member of the Løgting
- Incumbent
- Assumed office 31 August 2019

Personal details
- Born: 12 February 1997 (age 29)
- Party: People's
- Relatives: Vilhelm Johannesen (grandfather); Aksel V. Johannesen (uncle)

Beinir Johannesen (born 12 February 1997) is a Faroese politician serving as the Prime Minister of the Faroe Islands since 2026 and as a member of the Løgting since 2019. He has served as chairman of the People's Party since 2022. Johannesen became prime minister after his party finished first in the 2026 election.
