= 2011 Faroese general election =

Danish territorial election

- 29 October 2011
Party	Leader	Vote %	Seats	+/–
Union	Kaj Leo Johannesen	24.70	8	+1
People's	Jørgen Niclasen	22.53	8	+1
Republic	Høgni Hoydal	18.29	6	−2
Social Democratic	Aksel V. Johannesen	17.77	6	0
Progress	Poul Michelsen	6.33	2	New
Centre	Jenis av Rana	6.16	2	−1
Self-Government Party	Kári P. Højgaard	4.22	1	−1
This lists parties that won seats. See the complete results below.
Prime Minister before	Prime Minister
Kaj Leo Johannesen; Union	Kaj Leo Johannesen; Union

Early general elections were held in the Faroe Islands on 29 October 2011. Faroese law states that new elections must be held at least once every four years; however, either the Prime Minister (Løgmaður) or a majority of the members of the Faroese Parliament (the Løgting) may call an election before the end of this period. The previous elections having been held on 20 January 2008, the latest date on which the next elections could have been held was 19 January 2012. However, the Prime Minister of the Faroe Islands, Kaj Leo Johannesen, announced on 27 September 2011 that elections would be held on 29 October 2011. He gave no particular reason for his decision.

Parliamentary elections must be held no earlier than four weeks and no later than five weeks after the announcement has been made.

== Results ==
The centre-right parties gained significantly, with both the pro-union Union Party and pro-independence People's Party gaining a seat each, while the new Progress movement (classical liberal) – formed seven months earlier as a breakaway from the People's Party – entered the Løgting with two seats. The left-wing and centrist parties all lost ground in consequence.

Party	Votes	%	Seats	+/–
Union Party	7,546	24.70	8	+1
People's Party	6,883	22.53	8	+1
Republic	5,589	18.29	6	–2
Social Democratic Party	5,428	17.77	6	0
Progress	1,933	6.33	2	New
Centre Party	1,883	6.16	2	–1
Self-Government Party	1,290	4.22	1	–1
Total	30,552	100.00	33	0
Valid votes	30,552	99.48		
Invalid/blank votes	161	0.52		
Total votes	30,713	100.00		
Registered voters/turnout	35,447	86.64		
Source: Logting

== See also ==
- List of members of the Løgting, 2011–15
