= 2002 Faroese general election =

Danish territorial election

- 30 April 2002
- Turnout: 91.6%
Party	Leader	Vote %	Seats	+/–
Union	Lisbeth L. Petersen	26.0%	8	+2
Republic	Høgni Hoydal	23.7%	8	0
Social Democratic	Jóannes Eidesgaard	20.9%	7	0
People's	Anfinn Kallsberg	20.8%	7	−1
Self-Government Party	Eyðun Elttør	4.4%	1	−1
Centre	Jenis av Rana	4.2%	1	0
This lists parties that won seats. See the complete results below.
Prime Minister before	Prime Minister
Anfinn Kallsberg; People's	Anfinn Kallsberg; People's

General elections were held in the Faroe Islands on 30 April 2002.

== Results ==
Party	Votes	%	Seats	+/–
Union Party	7,954	26.03	8	+2
Republican Party	7,229	23.66	8	0
Social Democratic Party	6,378	20.87	7	0
People's Party	6,352	20.79	7	–1
Self-Government Party	1,351	4.42	1	–1
Centre Party	1,292	4.23	1	0
Total	30,556	100.00	32	0
Valid votes	30,556	99.48		
Invalid/blank votes	161	0.52		
Total votes	30,717	100.00		
Registered voters/turnout	33,522	91.63		
Source: Løgting

== See also ==
- List of members of the Løgting, 2002–04
