= 1920 Faroese general election =

Danish territorial election

- 10 November 1920
Party	Leader	Vote %	Seats	+/–
Union	Oliver Effersøe	58.41	10	+1
Self-Government	Jóannes Patursson	41.59	10	−1
This lists parties that won seats. See the complete results below.

General elections were held in the Faroe Islands on 10 November 1920. The Union Party and the Self-Government Party both won 10 of the 20 seats in the Løgting.

== Results ==
Party	Votes	%	Seats	+/–
Union Party	3,478	58.41	10	+1
Self-Government Party	2,476	41.59	10	–1
Total	5,954	100.00	20	0
Source: Løgting
