= 2004 Faroese general election =

Danish territorial election

- 20 January 2004
- Turnout: 92.3%
Party	Leader	Vote %	Seats	+/–
Union	Lisbeth L. Petersen	23.7%	7	−1
Social Democratic	Jóannes Eidesgaard	21.8%	7	0
Republic	Høgni Hoydal	21.7%	8	0
People's	Anfinn Kallsberg	20.6%	7	0
Centre	Jenis av Rana	5.2%	2	+1
Self-Government Party	Kári P. Højgaard	4.6%	1	0
This lists parties that won seats. See the complete results below.
Prime Minister before	Prime Minister
Anfinn Kallsberg; People's	Jóannes Eidesgaard; Social Democratic

Parliamentary elections were held in the Faroe Islands on 20 January 2004.

== Candidates ==
Hin Stuttligi Flokkurin (English: The Funny Party), the joke political party founded in 2004 by Johan Dalsgaard, got 747 votes in the Faroese parliament election in 2004. The party is based upon political satire. Dalsgaard was mainly inspired by Jacob Haugaard, who pulled a similar prank in the Danish parliament. Johan Dalsgaard was not the only candidate on the list. Rubek Lilaa was the candidate for Eysturoyar Valdømi. At that time the Faroe Islands had 7 districts, so people could only vote for a candidate from their own district (valdømi). Hin stuttliga Flokkurin had two candidates, Johan Dalsgaard was candidate for the South Streymoy district (Suðurstreymoyar valdømi) and Rubek Lilaa was candidate in Eysturoy. The party had no other candidates.

== Results ==
Party	Votes	%	Seats	+/–
Union Party	7,501	23.65	7	–1
Social Democratic Party	6,921	21.83	7	0
Republican Party	6,890	21.73	8	0
People's Party	6,530	20.59	7	0
Centre Party	1,661	5.24	2	+1
Self-Government Party	1,461	4.61	1	0
Hin Stuttligi Flokkurin	747	2.36	0	New
Total	31,711	100.00	32	0
Valid votes	31,711	99.76		
Invalid/blank votes	77	0.24		
Total votes	31,788	100.00		
Registered voters/turnout	34,426	92.34		
Source: IFES

== See also ==
- List of members of the Løgting, 2004–08
