= Fríðrikur Petersen =

Faroese politician and bishop (1853–1917)

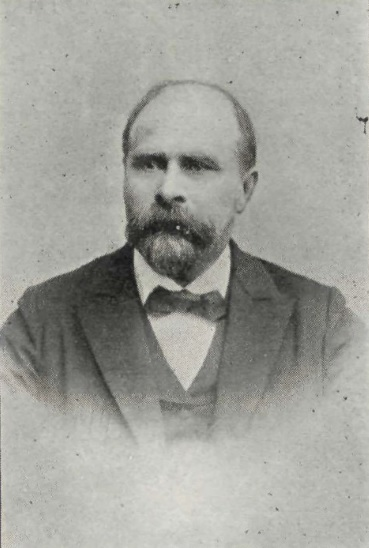
Fríðrikur Petersen

Fríðrikur Petersen (April 22, 1853 – April 26, 1917) was a noted Faroese Unionist politician and clergyman.

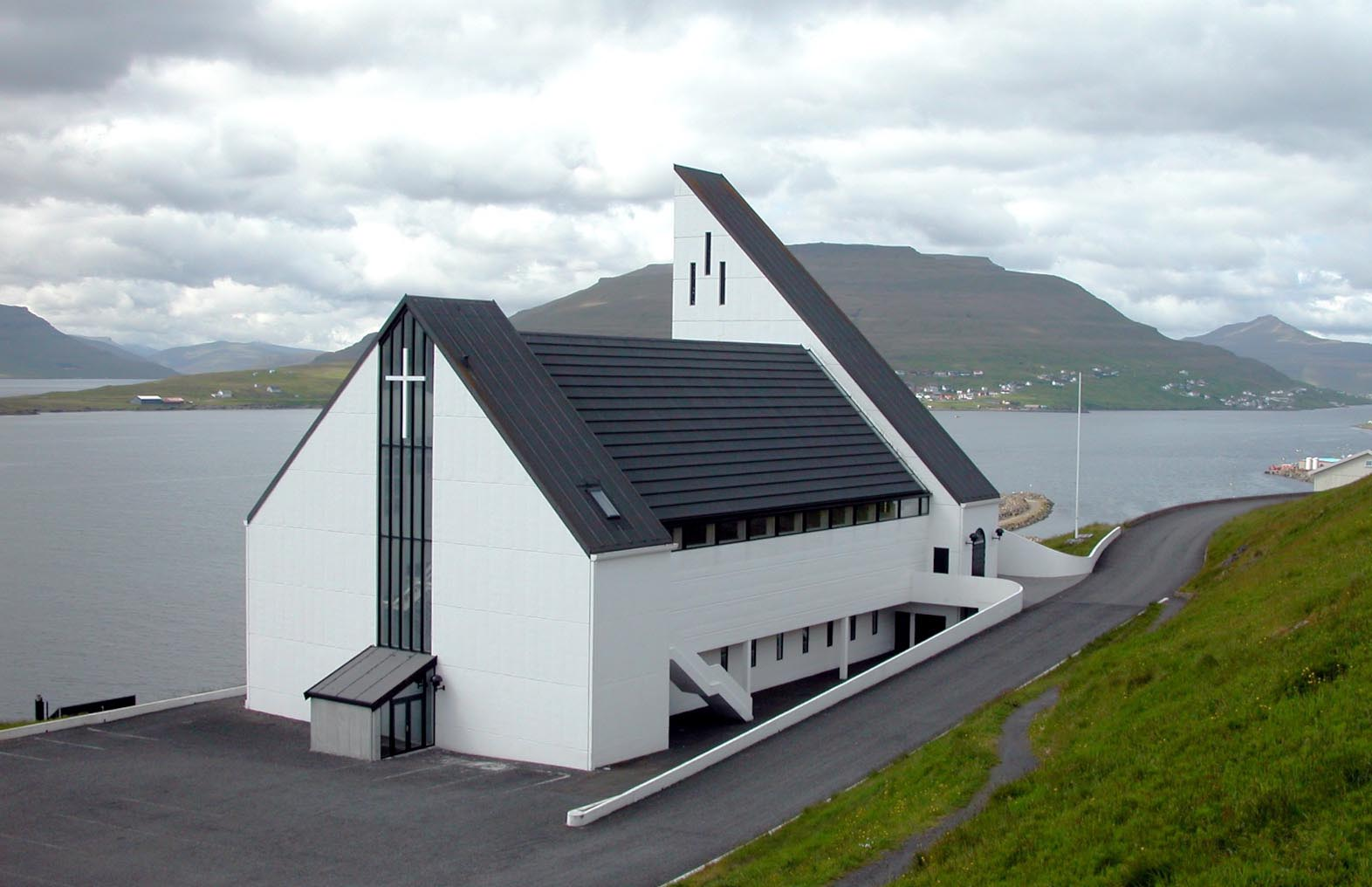
Frederik's Church in Nes

== Biography ==
Petersen was born at Saltnes in Eysturoy. He was the son of Johannes Petersen (1812–1901) and Susanne Frederikke Olesdatter (1826–1905). He became a student in Reykjavík, Iceland in 1875 and was awarded his Cand.theol. in 1880. He was married in 1880 with Sophie Amalie Wesenberg (1861–1919). He was ordained a Lutheran priest in the Church of the Faroe Islands (Fólkakirkjan). He served as parish priest at Sandoynni (1880), Suðuroy (1885) and at Østerø (1900). He was a rural dean at Nes in Eysturoy from 1900 to 1917.

Petersen was chairman of the Sambandpartiet from its foundation in 1906 until his death in 1917. He was a member of the Faroese Løgting (1890) and the Danish Landsting (1892–1900). He served as county councilor for the Faroe Islands 1894–1902.

He died on April 26, 1917, in Copenhagen.

== Frederik's Church in Nes ==
Fredericks Church (Fríðrikskirkjan) in Nes was completed in 1994 and was named in honor of Fríðrikur Petersen.

== See also ==
- Faroese People's Church
