= Union Party (Faroe Islands) =

Union Party Sambandsflokkurin
- Chairperson: Bárður á Steig Nielsen
- Founded: 18 August 1906
- Headquarters: Áarvegur 2, Tórshavn
- Ideology: Conservative liberalism; Agrarianism (Nordic); Danish unionism
- Political position: Centre-right
- National affiliation: Venstre
- Nordic affiliation: Centre Group
- Colours: Light blue, white
- Løgting: 7 / 33
- Folketing (Faroe seats): 1 / 2

Website
- www.samband.fo

The Union Party (Faroese: Sambandsflokkurin, Danish: Sambandspartiet), also translated Unionist Party, is a conservative-liberal, agrarian political party on the Faroe Islands. The party wants to maintain the Faroe Islands' union with Denmark. On 24 October 2015, Bárður á Steig Nielsen succeeded Kaj Leo Johannesen as party leader.

In the elections in 2008, the party won 21.0% of the popular vote and 7 out of 33 seats. After having been in the opposition for a short interval after the elections, the Union Party formed a new government in September 2008, and Kaj Leo Johannesen became prime minister.

In the Danish parliamentary elections of 2007, the party received 23.5% of the Faroese vote, thereby gaining one of the two Faroese seats in the national legislature of Denmark.

At the general elections in 2011, the party gained 24.7% of the votes and eight seats out of 33. However, on 10 February 2014, the party gained one more seat in the Løgting, after Gerhard Lognberg who was elected to the parliament representing the Social Democratic Party, joined the Union Party. This happened three months after Lognberg had been expelled from the Social Democratic Party due to some disagreements, making the Union Party the joint biggest party of the Faroese parliament, along with the People's Party.

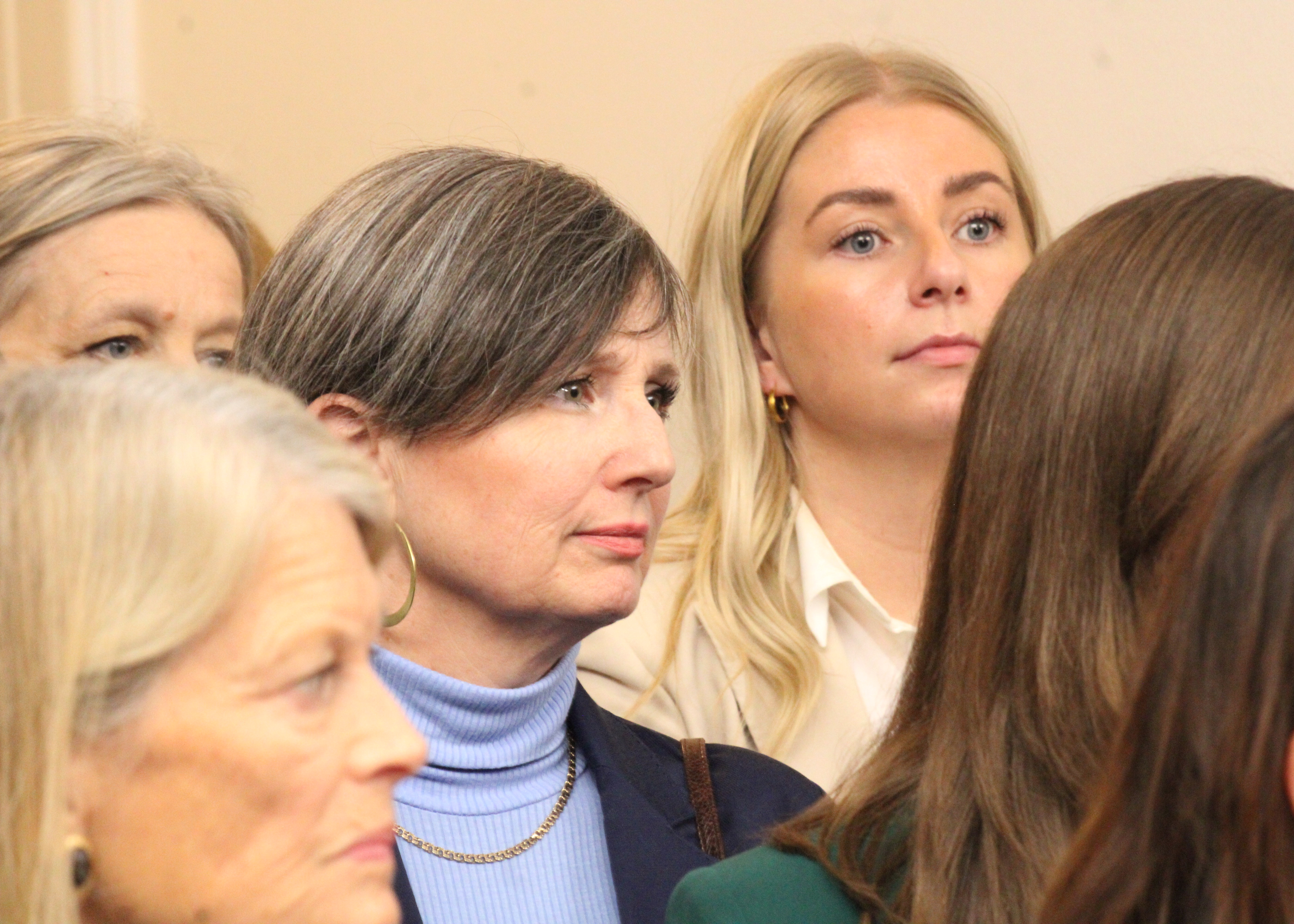
Anna Falkenberg, the party's current member of the Folketing

== Election results ==
Year	Votes		Seats		Position	Government
Year	#	%	#	±	Position	Government
1906	961	62.4	12 / 20	New	▲1st	Majority
1908	663	66.1	13 / 20	▲1	1st	Majority
1910	861	72.2	13 / 20	0	1st	Majority
1912	459	52.3	13 / 20	0	1st	Majority
1914	699	52.7	12 / 20	▼1	1st	Majority
1916	397	37.8	10 / 20	▼2	1st	Minority
1918	2,969	50.2	9 / 20	▼1	▼2nd	Opposition
1920	3,478	58.4	10 / 20	▲1	▲1st	Minority
1924	3,676	58.6	13 / 23	▲3	1st	Majority
1928	2,917	46.0	10 / 23	▼3	▼2nd	Opposition
1932	3,936	50.1	11 / 21	▲1	▲1st	Majority
1936	2,654	33.6	8 / 24	▼3	▼2nd	Opposition
1940	2,722	32.2	8 / 24	0	▲1st	Minority
1943	2,736	28.3	8 / 25	0	▼2nd	Opposition
1945	3,214	24.4	6 / 25	▼2	2nd	Opposition
1946	3,783	28.6	6 / 25	0	2nd	Opposition
1950	3,170	27.3	7 / 25	▲1	2nd	Coalition
1954	3,312	26.0	7 / 27	0	▲1st	Coalition
1958	3,288	23.7	7 / 30	0	▼3rd	Coalition
1962	3,082	20.3	6 / 29	▼1	3rd	Opposition
1966	4,177	23.7	6 / 26	0	▲2nd	Coalition
1970	3,921	21.7	6 / 26	0	▼3rd	Coalition
1974	3,799	19.5	5 / 26	▼1	▼4th	Opposition
1978	5,966	26.3	8 / 32	▲3	▲1st	Opposition
1980	5,558	23.9	8 / 32	0	1st	Coalition
1984	5,330	21.2	7 / 32	0	▼3rd	Opposition
1988	6,116	21.2	7 / 32	0	3rd	Opposition
1990	5,367	18.9	6 / 32	▼1	3rd	Coalition
1994	5,986	23.4	8 / 32	▲2	▲1st	Coalition
1998	4,995	18.0	6 / 32	▼2	▼4th	Opposition
2002	7,954	26.0	8 / 32	▲2	▲1st	Opposition
2004	7,501	23.7	7 / 32	▼1	1st	Coalition
2008	7,501	23.7	7 / 33	0	▼2nd	Coalition
2011	7,546	24.7	8 / 33	▲1	▲1st	Coalition
2015	6,036	18.7	6 / 33	▼2	▼4th	Opposition
2019	6,874	20.4	7 / 33	▲1	▲3rd	Coalition
2022	6,834	20.0	7 / 33	0	▲2nd	Opposition
2026	7,600	21.51	7 / 33	0	2nd	Coalition

== Leaders ==
Leaders of the Union Party:

- Bárður á Steig Nielsen 2015—present
- Kaj Leo Johannesen 2004–2015
- Lisbeth L. Petersen 2001–2004
- Edmund Joensen 1990–2001
- Pauli Ellefsen 1974–1990
- Trygvi Samuelsen 1970–1974
- Johan Poulsen 1948–1970
- Andrass Samuelsen 1924–1948
- Oliver Effersøe 1917–1924
- Fríðrikur Petersen 1906–1917

== Current members of the Løgting ==
As of the 2022 general snap election:

Name	Status	Votes	Title
Bárður á Steig Nielsen	Re-elected	1,355	Member of the Logting
Magnus Rasmussen	Re-elected	713	Member of the Logting
Erhard Joensen	Elected	528	Member of the Logting
Johan Dahl	Re-elected	502	Second Vice-Chairman ("Deputy Speaker") of the Logting
Eyðdis Hartmann Niclasen	Elected	347	Member of the Logting
Kaj Leo Holm Johannesen	Re-elected	305	Member of the Logting
Helgi Abrahamsen	Re-elected	284	Member of the Logting
