= Andrass Samuelsen =

Prime Minister of the Faroe islands (1948–1950)

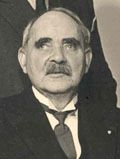

Prime Minister of the Faroe Islands
- In office 12 May 1948 – 15 December 1950
- Monarch: Frederik IX
- Preceded by: Position Established
- Succeeded by: Kristian Djurhuus

Personal details
- Born: 1 July 1873; Haldarsvík, Faroe Islands
- Died: 30 June 1954 (aged 80); Fuglafjørður, Faroe Islands
- Political party: Union Party
- Spouse: Beata Emilia

Andrass Samuelsen (Danish: Andreas Samuelsen; 1 July 1873 – 30 June 1954) was a Faroese politician and member of the Union Party. He was the first Prime Minister of the Faroe Islands after the autonomy of the Faroe Islands in 1948 (Heimastýrislógin).

Andrass was the son of Katrina Malena, born Mikkelsen and Sámal Joensen from Haldarsvík. He was married to Beata Emilia, born Lindenskov from Tórshavn.

Between 1906 and 1950 Samuelsen was a member of the Faroese parliament (Løgting). From 1913 to 1916 and 1918 to 1939 he was also a member of the Danish Folketing and he was a member of the Landsting from 1917 to 1918. From 1924 to 1948 Samuelsen was the chairman of the Union Party. From 1948 to 1950 he was the Prime Minister of the Faroe Islands and was the first Prime Minister of the Faroe Islands since the office had been abolished in 1816. He died on 30 June 1954, aged 80. He would have been 81 years old the following day.

His son Georg Lindenskov Samuelsen (1910–1997) was the publisher of the newspaper Dimmalætting for almost 50 years. His granddaughter Lisbeth L. Petersen was one of the first women in Faroese politics, and his grandson Eilif Samuelsen is a Faroese politician.

Political offices
Preceded by Position re-created	Prime Minister of the Faroe Islands; 1948-1950	Succeeded by Kristian Djurhuus
