= Sjálvstýri =

Faroese political party

Self-Government Sjálvstýri
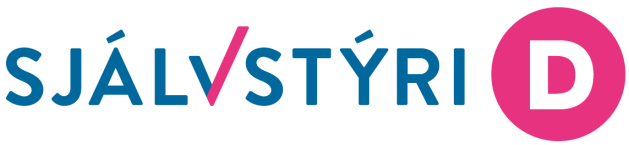
- Leader: Sámal Petur í Grund (acting)
- Founded: 1909
- Ideology: Liberalism; Social liberalism Regionalism; Autonomism
- Political position: Centre
- National affiliation: Danish Social Liberal Party
- Nordic affiliation: Centre Group
- Colours: Pink
- Løgting: 1 / 33
- Folketing (Faroe seats): 0 / 2

Election symbol
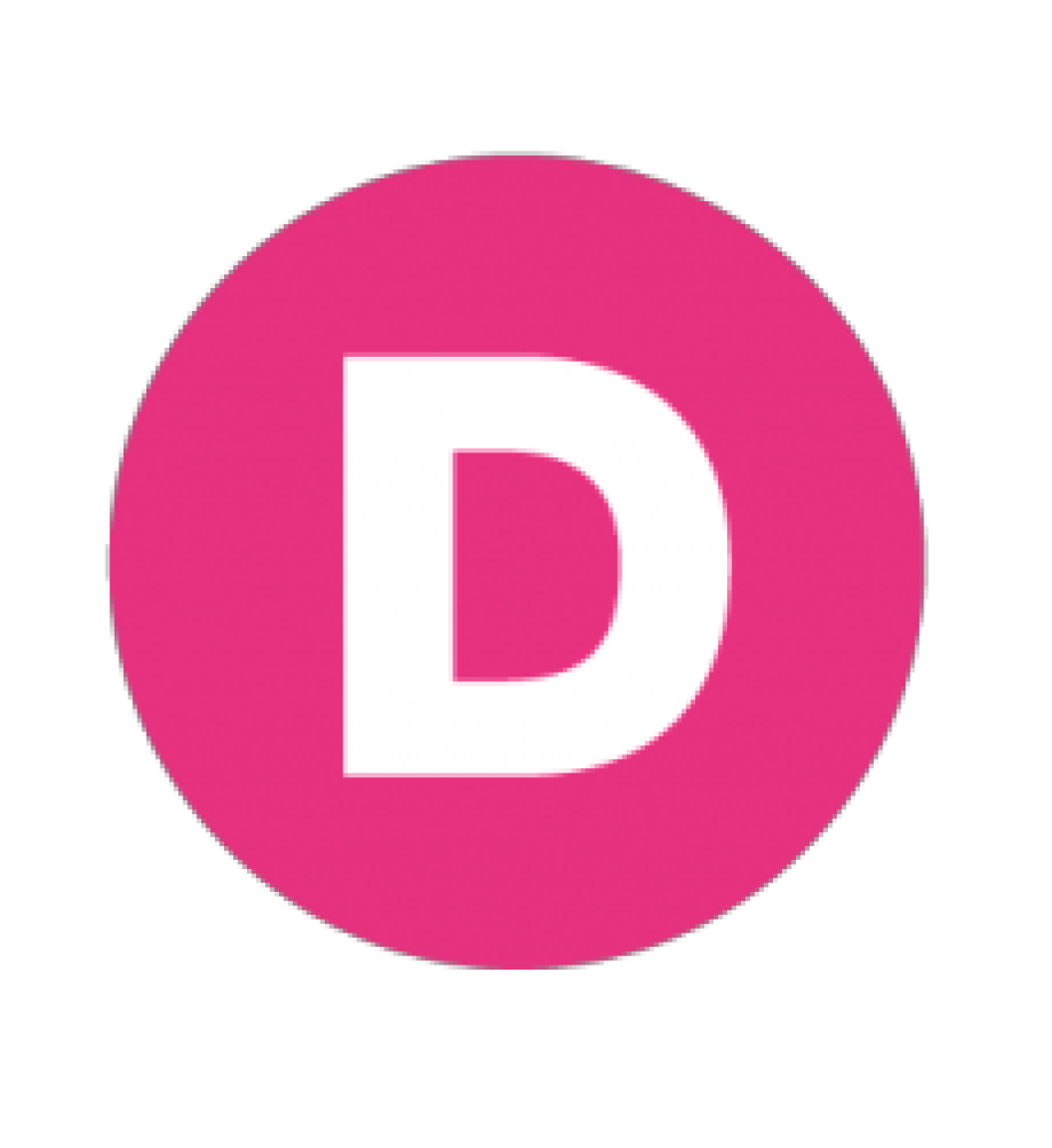

Website
- www.sjalvstyri.fo

Sjálvstýri (previously Sjálvstýrisflokkurin) (English: referred to interchangeably as Independence, Self-Government, or Home Rule) is a liberal, autonomist political party on the Faroe Islands. It is currently led by Sámal Petur í Grund.

== History ==
Nýtt Sjálvstýri traditionally supported greater autonomy for the Faroes within the Kingdom of Denmark, but in 1998 it agreed, as part of a coalition deal with Tjóðveldi and Fólkaflokkurin, to support national independence for the Faroes. Today it supports obtaining independence through gradually increasing Faroese autonomy until the Faroe Islands becomes a de facto independent state.

At the 2008 election to the Løgting, the party won 7.2% of the popular vote and two out of 33 seats. In early elections in 2011, the party's vote fell to 4.2% and it lost one seat. At the 2011 election to the Løgting, the party won 4% of the votes; two members were elected. The party failed to reach the electoral threshold of 3.03% in the 2022 general election and therefore did not win any seats. It reentered the Løgting in the 2026 general election with 1 seat.

== Leaders ==
Party leaders

- Sámal Petur í Grund 18 December 2022– (acting)
- Kári P. Højgaard 23 February–18 December 2022
- Jógvan Skorheim 9 April 2015–23 February 2022
- Kári P. Højgaard 2011–2015
- Kári á Rógvi 2010–2011
- Kári P. Højgaard 2003–2010
- Eyðun Elttør 2001–2003
- Sámal Petur í Grund 2001
- Helena Dam á Neystabø 1994–2001
- Hilmar Kass 1971–1994
- Niels Winther Poulsen 1962–1971
- Louis Zachariasen 1939–1962
- Edward Mitens 1936–1939
- Jóannes Patursson 1909–1936

Parliamentary leaders

- Kári P. Højgaard 2013–present
- Jógvan Skorheim 2011–2013
- Kári P. Højgaard 2001–2011
- Sámal Petur í Grund 1998–2001
- Helena Dam á Neystabø 1993–1998
- Lasse Klein 1988–1993
- Hilmar Kass 1970–1988

== Current members of the Løgting ==
As of the 2026 general election:

Name	Elected (E), Re-elected (R), or Appointed (A)	Votes obtained in the general election	Title
Sámal Petur í Grund	E	549	Member of the Løgting

== Election results ==
Faroese general election

Year	Votes		Seats		Position
Year	#	%	#	±	Position
1910	289	24.3	7 / 20	New	▲2nd
1912	365	41.6	7 / 20	0	2nd
1914	625	47.2	8 / 20	▲1	2nd
1916	542	51.7	9 / 20	▲1	▲1st
1918	2,938	49.7	11 / 20	▲2	▼2nd
1920	2,476	41.6	10 / 20	▼1	2nd
1924	2,450	39.1	10 / 23	0	2nd
1928	2,680	42.3	11 / 23	▲1	2nd
1932	2,931	37.3	8 / 21	▼3	2nd
1936	2,694	34.2	8 / 24	0	▲1st
1940	1,365	16.2	4 / 24	▼4	▼4th
1943	1,001	10.4	0 / 25	▼4	4th
1945	1,235	9.4	0 / 23	0	4th
1946	With the Social Democratic Party		2 / 20	▲2	▲3rd
1950	957	8.2	2 / 25	0	▼5th
1954	908	7.1	2 / 27	0	5th
1958	816	5.9	2 / 30	0	5th
1962	892	5.9	2 / 29	0	5th
1966	867	4.9	1 / 26	▼1	5th
1970	1,010	5.6	1 / 26	0	5th
1974	1,430	7.2	2 / 26	▲1	5th
1978	1,626	7.2	2 / 32	0	5th
1980	1,953	8.4	3 / 32	▲1	5th
1984	2,135	8.5	2 / 32	▼1	5th
1988	2,033	7.1	2 / 32	0	5th
1990	2,489	8.8	3 / 32	▲1	5th
1994	1,437	5.6	2 / 32	▼1	▼8th
1998	2,116	7.6	2 / 32	0	▲5th
2002	1,351	4.4	1 / 32	▼1	5th
2004	1,461	4.6	1 / 32	0	▼6th
2008	2,244	7.2	2 / 33	▲1	6th
2011	1,290	4.2	1 / 33	▼1	▼7th
2015	1,305	4.0	2 / 33	▲1	7th
2019	1,157	3.4	1 / 33	▼1	7th
2022	938	2.7	0 / 33	▼1	7th
2026	1,284	3.6	1 / 33	▲1	7th

Danish general election

Year	Votes		Members
Year	#	%	Members
1939	314	5.0	0 / 1
1943	Did not contest		
1945	With the Social Democratic Party		0 / 1
1947	809	8.4	0 / 2
1950	535	14.8	0 / 2
1953 (Apr)	351	10.4	0 / 2
1953 (Sept)	Did not contest		
1957	Did not contest		
1960	Did not contest		
1964	Did not contest		
1966	Did not contest		
1968	Did not contest		
1971	648	4.9	0 / 2
1973	553	4.2	0 / 2
1975	Did not contest		
1977	551	3.4	0 / 2
1979	797	4.3	0 / 2
1981	867	5.2	0 / 2
1984	1,033	5.6	0 / 2
1987	1,070	4.8	0 / 2
1988	897	3.9	0 / 2
1990	1,240	6.9	0 / 2
1994	469	2.4	0 / 2
1998	1,603	7.7	0 / 2
2001	434	1.6	0 / 2
2005	585	2.4	0 / 2
2007	799	3.5	0 / 2
2011	483	2.3	0 / 2
2015	400	1.7	0 / 2
2019	334	1.3	0 / 2
2022	Did not contest		
2026	Did not contest		
