= List of members of the Løgting, 2022–2026 =

This is a list of the members of the Faroese Løgting in the period 2022–2026; they were elected at the general snap election on 8 December 2022. The thirty-three elected members are:

Name	Party
Helgi Abrahamsen	Union Party
Johan Dahl	Union Party
Elsebeth Mercedis Gunnleygsdóttur	People's Party
Bjarni Hammer	Social Democratic Party
Dennis Holm	Republic
Høgni Hoydal	Republic
Djóni Nolsøe Joensen	Social Democratic Party
Erhard Joensen	Union Party
Jóhannis Joensen	Social Democratic Party
Aksel V. Johannesen	Social Democratic Party
Beinir Johannesen	People's Party
Kaj Leo Holm Johannesen	Union Party
Uni Holm Johannesen	Social Democratic Party
Bárður á Lakjuni	People's Party
Eyðdis Hartmann Niclasen	Union Party
Jørgen Niclasen	People's Party
Bárður á Steig Nielsen	Union Party
Sólvit Nolsø	Progress
Henrik Old	Social Democratic Party
Annika Olsen	Republic
Hervør Pálsdóttir	Republic
Bjarni K. Petersen	Progress
Steffan Klein Poulsen	Centre Party
Jenis av Rana	Centre Party
Magnus Rasmussen	Union Party
Bjørt Samuelsen	Republic
Eyðgunn Samuelsen	Social Democratic Party
Árni Skaale	People's Party
Sirið Stenberg	Republic
Margit Stórá	Social Democratic Party
Ingilín Didriksen Strøm	Social Democratic Party
Ruth Vang	Progress
Jacob Vestergaard	People's Party
