= List of members of the Løgting, 2019–2022 =

This is a list of the members of the Faroese Løgting in the period 2019–2022; they were elected at the general election on 31 August 2019. The thirty-three elected members are:

Name	Party
Helgi Abrahamsen	Union Party
Christian Andreasen	People's Party
Johan Dahl	Union Party
Elsebeth Mercedis Gunnleygsdóttur	People's Party
Kristina Háfoss	Republic
Bjarni Hammer	Social Democratic Party
Høgni Hoydal	Republic
Jóhannis Joensen	Social Democratic Party
Aksel V. Johannesen	Social Democratic Party
Beinir Johannesen	People's Party
Kaj Leo Holm Johannesen	Union Party
Bill Justinussen	Centre Party
Jógvan á Lakjuni	People's Party
Beinta Løwe	Republic
Kristin Michelsen	Self-Government
Poul Michelsen	Progress
Jákup Mikkelsen	People's Party
Heðin Mortensen	Social Democratic Party
Jørgen Niclasen	People's Party
Bárður á Steig Nielsen	Union Party
Djóni Nolsøe Joensen	Social Democratic Party
Henrik Old	Social Democratic Party
Hervør Pálsdóttir	Republic
Bjarni K. Petersen	Progress
Jenis av Rana	Centre Party
Frimodt Rasmussen	Union Party
Magnus Rasmussen	Union Party
Uni Rasmussen	People's Party
Bjørt Samuelsen	Republic
Rósa Samuelsen	Union Party
Sirið Stenberg	Republic
Ingilín Didriksen Strøm	Social Democratic Party
Jacob Vestergaard	People's Party
