= Cabinet of Bárður á Steig Nielsen =

- Cabinet of Faroe Islands

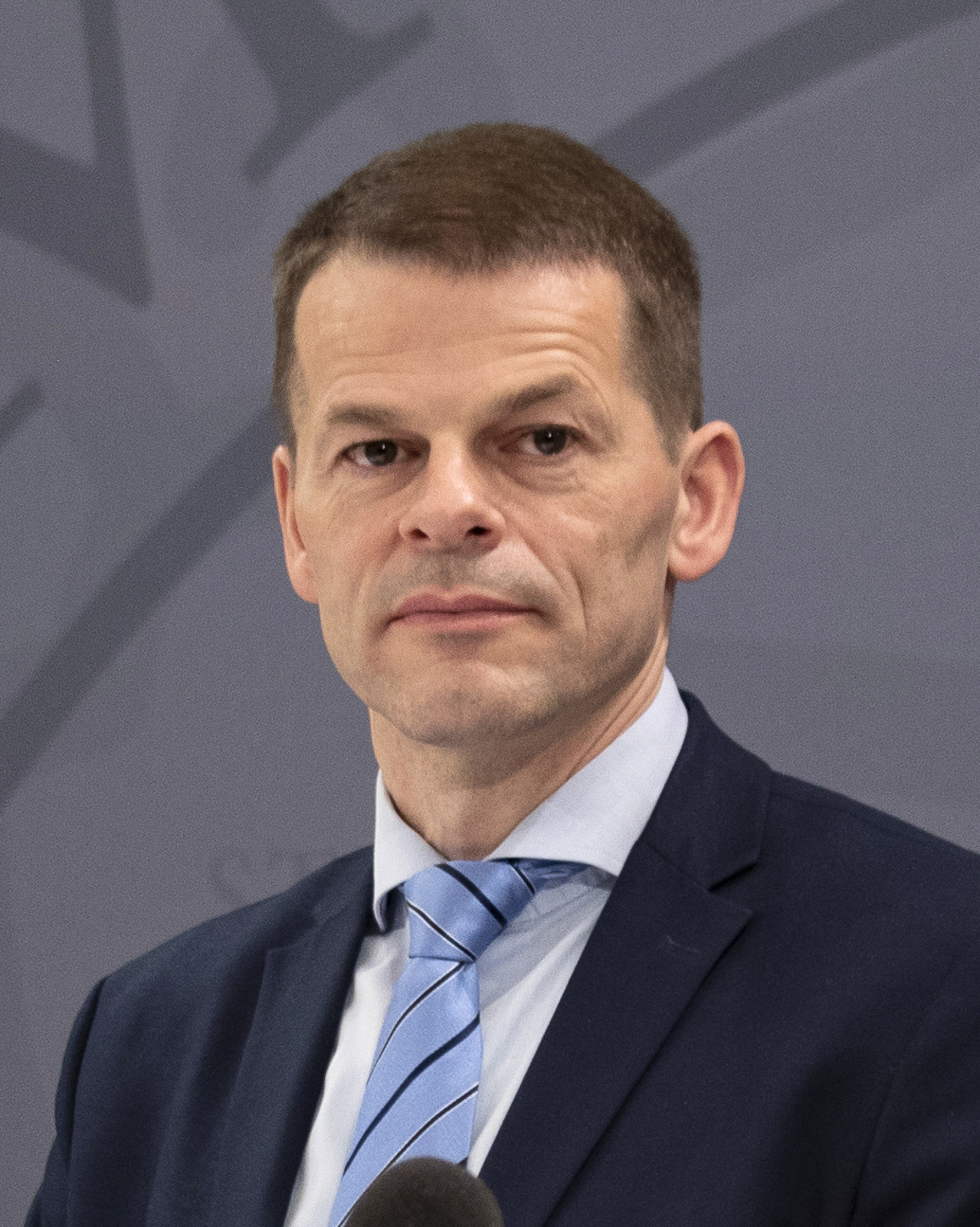
- Bárður á Steig Nielsen
- Date formed: 16 September 2019
- Date dissolved: 9 November 2022

People and organisations
- Prime Minister: Bárður á Steig Nielsen
- Deputy Prime Minister: Jørgen Niclasen (until 16 Feb. 2022); Uni Rasmussen (since 16 Feb. 2022)
- Member party: People's Party (A), Union Party (B), Centre Party (H) (until 8 Nov. 2022)
- Status in legislature: Majority (coalition)
- Opposition party: Social Democratic Party (C), Republic (E), Progress (F), Self-Government (D), Centre Party (H) (since 8 Nov. 2022)

History
- Election: 31 August 2019
- Predecessor: Cabinet of Aksel V. Johannesen I
- Successor: Cabinet of Aksel V. Johannesen II

The Cabinet of Bárður á Steig Nielsen was the government of the Faroe Islands between 16 September 2019 and 9 November 2022, with Bárður á Steig Nielsen from Union Party as prime minister, making a coalition between People's Party and Centre Party.

During the campaign for the November 2022 Danish general election, Centre Party leader and Faroese minister of foreign affairs Jenis av Rana stated that he could not support Søren Pape Poulsen, the leader of the Conservative People's Party, becoming Prime Minister of Denmark as Poulsen is gay.

The opposition parties in the Løgting planned to call a motion of no confidence on 8 November 2022, but á Steig Nielsen sacked av Rana the same day. The Centre Party subsequently withdrew from the government, resulting in it losing its majority and Nielsen calling early elections.

== Composition ==
Cabinet
Portfolio	Minister	Took office	Left office	Party	Ref
Prime Minister	Bárður á Steig Nielsen	16 September 2019	22 December 2022	Union	
Deputy Prime Minister & Minister of Finance	Jørgen Niclasen	16 September 2019	16 February 2022	People's	
Deputy Prime Minister & Minister of Finance	Uni Rasmussen	16 February 2022	22 December 2022	People's	
Minister of Health	Kaj Leo Johannesen	16 September 2019	22 December 2022	Union	
Minister of Trade and Industry	Helgi Abrahamsen	16 September 2019	19 August 2021	Union	
Minister of Trade and Industry	Magnus Rasmussen	19 August 2021	22 December 2022	Union	
Minister of Fisheries	Jacob Vestergaard	16 September 2019	20 December 2021	People's	
Minister of Fisheries	Árni Skaale	5 January 2022	22 December 2022	People's	
Minister of Social Affairs	Elsebeth Mercedis Gunnleygsdóttur	16 September 2019	20 December 2021	People's	
Minister of Social Affairs	Sólvit Nolsø	5 January 2022	13 November 2022	People's	
Minister of Foreign Affairs and Education	Jenis av Rana	16 September 2019	8 November 2022	Centre	

== See also ==
- Cabinet of the Faroe Islands
- List of members of the parliament of the Faroe Islands, 2019–2022
