= Cabinet of Aksel V. Johannesen II =

Government of the Faroe Islands (2022–2026)

- Cabinet of Faroe Islands
- Date formed: 22 December 2022
- Date dissolved: 13 April 2026

People and organisations
- Prime Minister: Aksel V. Johannesen
- Deputy Prime Minister: Høgni Hoydal
- Member party: Social Democratic Party (C), Republic (E), Progress (F)
- Status in legislature: Majority (coalition)
- Opposition party: Union Party (B), People's Party (A), Centre Party (H)

History
- Election: 8 December 2022
- Predecessor: Cabinet of Bárður á Steig Nielsen
- Successor: Cabinet of Beinir Johannesen

The second cabinet of Aksel V. Johannesen is the current government of the Faroe Islands since 22 December 2022, with Aksel V. Johannesen from Social Democratic Party as Prime Minister, making a coalition between the Republic and Progress parties.

== Composition ==
Cabinet members
Portfolio	Minister	Took office	Left office	Party	Ref
Prime Minister	Aksel V. Johannesen	22 December 2022	13 April 2026	Social Democratic	
Deputy Prime Minister, Minister of Foreign Affairs, & Minister of Trade and Industry	Høgni Hoydal	22 December 2022	13 April 2026	Republic	
Minister of Finance	Ruth Vang	22 December 2022	13 April 2026	Progress	
Minister of Justice and Internal Affairs	Bjarni K. Petersen	22 December 2022	13 April 2026	Progress	
Minister of Social Affairs and Culture	Sirið Stenberg	22 December 2022	13 April 2026	Republic	
Minister of Health	Margit Stóra	22 December 2022	13 April 2026	Social Democratic	
Minister of Fisheries	Dennis Holm	22 December 2022	13 April 2026	Republic	
Minister of Children and Education	Djóni Nolsøe Joensen	22 December 2022	13 April 2026	Social Democratic	
Minister of Environment	Ingilín D. Strøm	22 December 2022	24 October 2024	Social Democratic	

== See also ==
- Cabinet of the Faroe Islands
- List of members of the Løgting, 2022–current
