= 2026 Faroese general election =

Danish territorial election

- 26 March 2026
- All 33 members in the Løgting; 17 seats needed for a majority
- Turnout: 89.49% (▲1.44pp)
Party	Leader	Vote %	Seats	+/–
People's	Beinir Johannesen	26.75	9	+3
Union	Bárður á Steig Nielsen	21.51	7	0
Social Democratic	Aksel V. Johannesen	18.88	6	−3
Republic	Sirið Stenberg	17.39	6	0
Progress	Ruth Vang	6.56	2	−1
Centre	Jenis av Rana	5.28	2	0
Sjálvstýri	Sámal Petur í Grund	3.63	1	+1
This lists parties that won seats. See the complete results below.
Most voted-for party by polling area
Prime Minister before	Prime Minister
Aksel V. Johannesen; Social Democratic	Beinir Johannesen; People's

General elections were held in the Faroe Islands on 26 March 2026 to elect all 33 members of the Løgting. The election took place two days after the Faroe Islands elected two members of the Folketing in the 2026 Danish general election on 24 March.

The opposition People's Party led by Beinir Johannesen came out on top, winning a total of 9 seats, up from 6 in the last election, and receiving both their largest vote share since 1950 and the largest vote share of any party since 1990. The ruling coalition Social Democratic Party lost 3 seats – its worst performance since 2011. Sjálvstýri, which had lost its representation in the Løgting for the first time in the previous election, regained a seat.

== Background ==
Early elections were held on 8 December 2022, after the government collapsed due to anti-LGBT comments made by then-Foreign Minister and leader of the conservative Centre Party Jenis av Rana, for which he was sacked by Prime Minister Bárður á Steig Nielsen, who then called for early elections, as the coalition parties lost their majority with the Centre Party withdrawing from the government.

As a result of these elections, a left-wing coalition consisting of the Social Democratic Party, Republic and Progress was formed, with Aksel V. Johannesen, leader of the Social Democratic Party, elected as Prime Minister (see Cabinet of Aksel V. Johannesen II).

Johannesen later said that the Social Democratic Party is ready to move away from bloc politics and form a coalition with the right-wing People's Party, despite these two parties historically not cooperating, and Johannesen refusing to do so in 2012.

A labour strike affecting the Faroe Islands that began on 13 May 2024 created economic strains in the local economy, including on grocery and fuel supplies. This labour strike ended on 10 June 2024 after labour unions agreed on a two-year contract that gave workers an hourly wage increase by a total of 16.80 DKK (2.25 EUR) over two years, a 13% increase over that period.

On 4 December 2025, the Løgting narrowly passed a bill 17 to 16 allowing free access to abortion up to 12 weeks. This bill replaced the previous law which only allowed abortion up to 16 weeks in the special cases of sexual assault, fetal abnormality, and health-related risks to the mother. The law is set to take effect in July 2026.

On 25 February 2026, the Løgting approved a legislative act for the construction of Suðuroyartunnilin, an undersea tunnel that would connect the islands of Sandoy and Suðuroy by road, replacing the currently operating ferry service. The bill was approved with a majority vote, but two members of Progress voted against it, causing tensions and lack of confidence between the coalition parties. A bill to raise the retirement age from 67 to 69 also generated controversy. Johannesen subsequently dissolved the Løgting and called for elections.

== Electoral system ==
The 33 members of the Løgting were elected by open list proportional representation in a single nationwide constituency with an electoral threshold of 1/33 of votes (3.0̅3̅%). Seats were allocated using the largest remainder method.

== Political parties and candidates ==
A total of 160 candidates from all seven political parties of the Faroe Islands participated in the 2026 election. The People's Party nominated the most with 34 candidates, followed by the Union Party and the Social Democratic Party with 29 candidates each. Republic nominated 27 candidates, followed by the Centre Party with 17 candidates, Progress with 14 candidates, and Sjálvstýri with 10 candidates.

Name		Ideology	Position	Leader	2022 result	
Name		Ideology	Position	Leader	Votes (%)	Seats
C	Social Democratic Party; Javnaðarflokkurin	Social democracy Unionism	Centre-left	Aksel V. Johannesen	26.6%	9 / 33
B	Union Party; Sambandsflokkurin	Conservative liberalism Unionism	Centre-right	Bárður á Steig Nielsen	20.0%	7 / 33
A	People's Party; Fólkaflokkurin	Conservatism; Separatism	Centre-right	Beinir Johannesen	18.9%	6 / 33
E	Republic; Tjóðveldi	Democratic socialism Separatism	Left-wing	Sirið Stenberg	17.7%	6 / 33
F	Progress; Framsókn	Classical liberalism Separatism	Centre-right	Ruth Vang	7.5%	3 / 33
H	Centre Party; Miðflokkurin	Christian democracy Separatism	Right-wing	Jenis av Rana	6.6%	2 / 33
D	Self-Government; Sjálvstýri	Social liberalism Autonomism	Centre	Sámal Petur í Grund	2.7%	0 / 33

== Campaign ==
The campaign period largely centered around addressing economic issues, including the brain drain in the Faroe Islands, the addition of shorter workweeks, and demand for affordable housing. In a debate on 25 March, all party leaders promised to leave the law allowing abortion up to 12 weeks alone.

=== Debates ===
2026 Faroese general election debates
Date	Organisers	P Present							
Date	Organisers	A	B	С	E	F	H	D	Refs
25 March	KVF	P Beinir Johannesen	P Bárður á Steig Nielsen	P Aksel V. Johannesen	P Sirið Stenberg	P Ruth Vang	P Jenis av Rana	P Sámal Petur í Grund	
20 March	KVF	P Jacob Vestergaard	P Atli F. Johansen	P Jóhannis Joensen	P Annika Olsen	P Bjarni K. Petersen	P Rani Andrasson Skaalum	P Pól Arni Holm	
19 March	KVF	P Fía Selma Nielsen	P Hermann N. Samuelsen	P Kristianna W. Poulsen	P Anfinn í Toft	P Marin Jakobsen	P Anna Margretha Otthamar	P Randi Meitil	
17 March	KVF	P Grímur Sundstein	P Lív Reinert Nielsen	P Eyðgunn Samuelsen	P Hervør Pálsdóttir	P Beinta Løwe	P Jóhan Marni Stenberg	P Sámal Hanni Lognberg	

== Opinion polls ==
		Parties								Government v. Opposition (Total) (Note: Excluding the percentages of any political party that does not meet the electoral threshold as stated on this page.)		
Polling firm	Fieldwork date	С	B	A	E	F	H	D	Lead	Government	Opposition	Lead
2026 election	26 March 2026	18.9; 6	21.5; 7	26.8; 9	17.4; 6	6.6; 2	5.3; 2	3.6; 1	5.2	42.8; 14	57.2; 19	14.4
2026 Danish election	24 March 2026	44.9	25.2	15.0	13.4	—N/a	1.5	—N/a	19.7	58.3	41.7	16.6
Spyr.fo	22 March 2026	17.4; 6	21.1; 7	26.6; 9	18.5; 6	6.0; 2	7.4; 3	3.0; 0	5.5	41.9; 14	58.1; 19	16.2
Spyr.fo	12 March 2026	18.8; 6	19.8; 7	29.0; 10	17.8; 6	6.9; 2	4.8; 2	2.9; 0	9.2	43.5; 14	56.5; 19	13
Spyr.fo	26 February 2026	16.0; 5	20.4; 7	34.0; 12	15.0; 5	6.3; 2	5.9; 2	2.4; 0	13.6	37.3; 11	62.7; 22	25.4
Spyr.fo	3 February 2026	12.4; 4	21.9; 7	37.3; 13	16.7; 6	4.2; 1	4.7; 2	2.9; 0	15.4	33.3; 11	66.7; 22	33.4
Spyr.fo	3 November 2025	15.0; 5	19.2; 6	32.9; 11	18.4; 6	7.5; 3	4.4; 2	2.6; 0	13.7	40.9; 14	59.1; 19	18.2
Spyr.fo	25 August 2025	14.6; 5	22.8; 8	31.2; 10	16.7; 6	7.4; 2	5.2; 2	2.1; 0	8.4	38.7; 13	61.3; 20	22.6
Spyr.fo	26 May 2025	14.5; 5	22.2; 8	34.0; 11	14.8; 5	7.3; 2	5.9; 2	1.2; 0	11.8	36.6; 12	63.4; 21	26.8
Spyr.fo	13 March 2025	19.3; 6	23.8; 8	27.0; 9	18.6; 6	4.9; 2	4.6; 1	1.8; 0	3.2	42.8; 14	57.2; 19	14.4
Spyr.fo	4 December 2024	19.6; 7	23.0; 8	28.5; 9	17.1; 6	5.3; 2	4.1; 1	2.4; 0	5.5	42.0; 15	58.0; 18	16.0
Spyr.fo	11 September 2024	20.4; 7	22.2; 8	28.8; 10	13.2; 4	6.9; 2	7.1; 2	1.3; 0	6.6	40.5; 13	59.5; 20	19.0
Spyr.fo	7 May 2024	19.4; 6	22.5; 8	26.5; 9	17.0; 6	6.7; 2	6.6; 2	1.3; 0	4.0	43.1; 14	56.9; 19	13.8
Spyr.fo	7 February 2024	19.3; 7	26.3; 9	25.2; 8	15.9; 5	5.9; 2	5.4; 2	1.9; 0	1.1	41.1; 14	58.9; 19	17.8
Spyr.fo	9 November 2023	18.2; 6	24.2; 8	29.5; 10	14.3; 5	5.2; 2	5.8; 2	2.9; 0	5.3	37.7; 13	62.3; 20	24.6
Spyr.fo	7 June 2023	24.1; 8	19.4; 7	23.2; 8	18.9; 6	6.9; 2	5.4; 2	2.3; 0	0.9	49.9; 16	50.1; 17	0.2
Spyr.fo	8 March 2023	25.7; 9	20.3; 7	19.3; 7	18.2; 6	7.5; 2	6.3; 2	2.2; 0	5.4	51.4; 17	48.6; 16	2.8
2022 election	8 December 2022	26.6; 9	20.0; 7	18.9; 6	17.7; 6	7.5; 3	6.6; 2	2.7; 0	6.6	51.8; 18	45.5; 15	6.3

== Results ==
The People's Party won the most with 26.8% of the vote, receiving nine seats, three more than the 2022 election. Their vote share was the highest any one party had received since 1990. The Union Party followed in second with 21.5% of the vote, receiving seven seats. In third place were the Social Democrats with 18.9% of the vote and six seats, a decrease in three seats. Republic similarly received six seats after winning 17.4% of the vote. Progress and the Centre Party received two seats each after the former won 6.6% and the latter won 5.3% of the vote. Sjálvstýri won one seat after receiving 3.6% of the vote, returning to the Løgting after losing their mandate in the previous election. The number of women elected to the Løgting was 10, the same amount as the last election. Turnout for the election was 89.5%, 1.4 percentage points higher than the last election.

Party	Votes	%	Seats	+/–
People's Party	9,451	26.75	9	+3
Union Party	7,600	21.51	7	0
Social Democratic Party	6,672	18.88	6	–3
Republic	6,143	17.39	6	0
Progress	2,319	6.56	2	–1
Centre Party	1,866	5.28	2	0
Sjálvstýri	1,284	3.63	1	+1
Total	35,335	100.00	33	0
Valid votes	35,335	99.43		
Invalid votes	57	0.16		
Blank votes	145	0.41		
Total votes	35,537	100.00		
Registered voters/turnout	39,703	89.51		
Source: kvf.fo

== Aftermath ==
Niels Uni Dam, the chairman of an advocacy group called Demokratia, expressed regret that the election did not break the record of 10 elected women, stressing that a stagnant representation for women would add onto the region's brain drain.

People's Party leader Beinir Johannesen pointed to himself to lead negotiations to form the next government. The outgoing prime minister Aksel V. Johannesen met with Løgting Speaker Bjørt Samuelsen, where he resigned on the morning of 28 March after failing to form a new government, also recommending that Beinir Johannesen start negotiations to form the next government. Union leader Bárður á Steig Nielsen and Republic leader Sirið Stenberg also recommended that Beinir be tasked in forming the next government. After all party chairpersons pointed to Beinir Johannesen, he was appointed formateur, and he began coalition negotiations with the Union Party and the Social Democrats on 30 March. Beinir was given until 10 April to form a coalition with the Unionists and Social Democrats. The coalition document between the People's Party, the Unionist Party, and the Social Democrats was approved by all three parties on 8 April, and was presented in a press conference the next day on 9 April. With the next government set to be sworn in on 13 April, Beinir Johannesen was now set to become the region's youngest prime minister, replacing his uncle Aksel.

The Løgting convened on 13 April 2026, and Johan Dahl was elected chairman with 32 votes in favour and one abstention. Elsebeth Mercedis Gunnleygsdóttur became the first vice-chair, followed by Hervør Pálsdóttir becoming second vice-chair, and Jóhannis Joensen being appointed as the third vice-chair. Beinir Johannesen was then elected prime minister with 26 votes in favour and seven blank votes. Bárður á Steig Nielsen was appointed as the Deputy Prime Minister and the Minister of the Board of Foreign Affairs and Fisheries. Aksel V. Johannesen became finance minister, Jacob Vestergaard became labour minister, Margit Stórá became the Minister of Public Affairs and Housing, Eyðdis Hartmann Niclasen became the Minister for Health and Energy, while Bárður á Lakjuni became the Minister of Intellectual Affairs. In the Centre Party, leadership elections resulted in Steffan Klein Poulsen replacing Jenis av Rana as party leader.
