= Politics of the Faroe Islands =

The politics of the Faroe Islands, an autonomous country (Danish: land) of the Kingdom of Denmark, function within the framework of a parliamentary, representative democratic dependency, whereby the Prime Minister of the Faroe Islands is the head of government, and of a multi-party system. The Faroe Islands are politically associated with the Kingdom of Denmark but have been self-governing since 1948. Executive power is exercised by the government. Legislative power is vested in both the government and the Løgting. The judiciary is independent of the executive and the legislature and the responsibility of Denmark.

== Executive branch ==
Main office-holders
Office	Name	Party	Since
King	Frederik X	Not applicable	14 January 2024
High Commissioner	Lene Moyell Johansen	Civil Servant	15 May 2017
Prime Minister	Beinir Johannesen	People's Party	13 April 2026

The high commissioner is appointed by the Monarch of Denmark. The High Commissioner has a seat in the Løgting, with the ability to speak in the Løgting regarding common Danish/Faroese affairs, but is unable to vote.

Following legislative elections, the leader of the party that wins the most seats is usually given the initiative to establish a new coalition by the Faroese Parliament, unless the current Løgmaður (Prime Minister in English) is still in power. However, if the leader fails, the chairman of the parliament asks all chairs of the parties elected to the parliament, and asks them to point to another party leader who they feel can rightly form a new coalition. The leader with the most votes is then handed the initiative.

The Løgmaður appoints and leads the landsstýri, the Cabinet, which is usually a coalition government. The landsstýri will often consist of around 7 members, called landsstýrismaður (male) or landsstýriskvinna (female). The word ráðharri is also used for a member of the cabinet, i.e. mentamálaráðharri (minister of culture) or heilsumálaráðharri (minister of health).

=== Current government ===
Following the 2026 Faroese general election, a new centre-left government was formed by Prime Minister Beinir Johannesen, consisting of members of Johannesen's People's Party, the Union Party and the Social Democratic Party.

Portfolio	Minister	Took office	Left office	Party	Ref
Prime Minister	Beinir Johannesen	13 April 2026	Incumbent	People's	
Deputy Prime Minister, Minister of Foreign Affairs, and Minister of Fisheries	Bárður á Steig Nielsen	13 April 2026	Incumbent	Union	
Minister of Finance	Aksel V. Johannesen	13 April 2026	Incumbent	Social Democratic	
Minister of Trade and Industry	Jacob Vestergaard	13 April 2026	Incumbent	People's	
Minister of Social Affairs and Housing	Margit Stórá	13 April 2026	Incumbent	Social Democratic	
Minister of Health and Energy	Eyðdis Hartmann Niclasen	13 April 2026	Incumbent	Union	
Minister of Children, Education, Research and Culture	Bárður á Lakjuni	13 April 2026	Incumbent	People's	

== Legislative branch ==
The Faroese Parliament (Løgtingið in Faroese) has 33 MPs (members of parliament), elected for a four-year term by proportional representation.

Election of 2 seats to the Danish Parliament was last held 31 October 2022: Social Democrat 1, Unionist 1.

== Political parties and elections ==
The Faroe Islands have a multi-party system, disputing on independence and unionism as well as left and right.

Schematic depiction of the political party spectrum in the Faroe Islands.: Fólkaflokkurin (A): People's Party; Sambandsflokkurin (B): Union Party; Javnaðarflokkurin (C): Social Democratic Party; Sjálvstýri (D): Self-Government; Tjóðveldi (E): Republic; Framsókn (F): Progress; Miðflokkurin (H): Centre Party

The Faroese Parliament (Løgting) has 33 seats. Members are elected by popular vote to serve four-year terms. For the Løgting elections, there were seven electoral districts, each one comprehending a sýslur, while Streymoy is divided into northern and southern parts (Tórshavn region), but since 2008, the Faroes constitute a single district. With numerous parties, a single party is rarely able to form a government alone, with coalition governments being the norm.

In the 2026 general election, the conservative People's Party won the election, with 26.8% of the vote and moving forward from five to nine seats in the Løgting. Their vote share was the highest of any one party since 1990. The Union Party and Social Democrats followed with seven and six seats respectively. The 2026 election also saw the return of Sjálvstýri with one seat, having lost their mandate in the previous election. The number of women elected to the Løgting was 10, the same amount as the last election.

Composition of the Løgting following the 2026 Faroese general election
Party	Votes	%	Seats	+/–
People's Party	9,451	26.75	9	+3
Union Party	7,600	21.51	7	0
Social Democratic Party	6,672	18.88	6	–3
Republic	6,143	17.39	6	0
Progress	2,319	6.56	2	–1
Centre Party	1,866	5.28	2	0
Sjálvstýri	1,284	3.63	1	+1
Total	35,335	100.00	33	0
Valid votes	35,335	99.43		
Invalid votes	57	0.16		
Blank votes	145	0.41		
Total votes	35,537	100.00		
Registered voters/turnout	39,703	89.51		
Source: kvf.fo

== Administrative divisions ==
The islands are administratively divided into 29 municipalities with about 120 cities and villages.

Traditionally, there are also the 6 sýslur (Norðoyar, Eysturoy, Streymoy, Vágar, Sandoy, and Suðuroy). Sýsla means district and although it is only a police district today, it is still commonly understood as a geographical region. In earlier times, each sýsla had its own ting, the so-called várting (spring ting).

== International affairs ==
The nation continues to be intimately tied with the Nordic countries of Europe and the European Union.

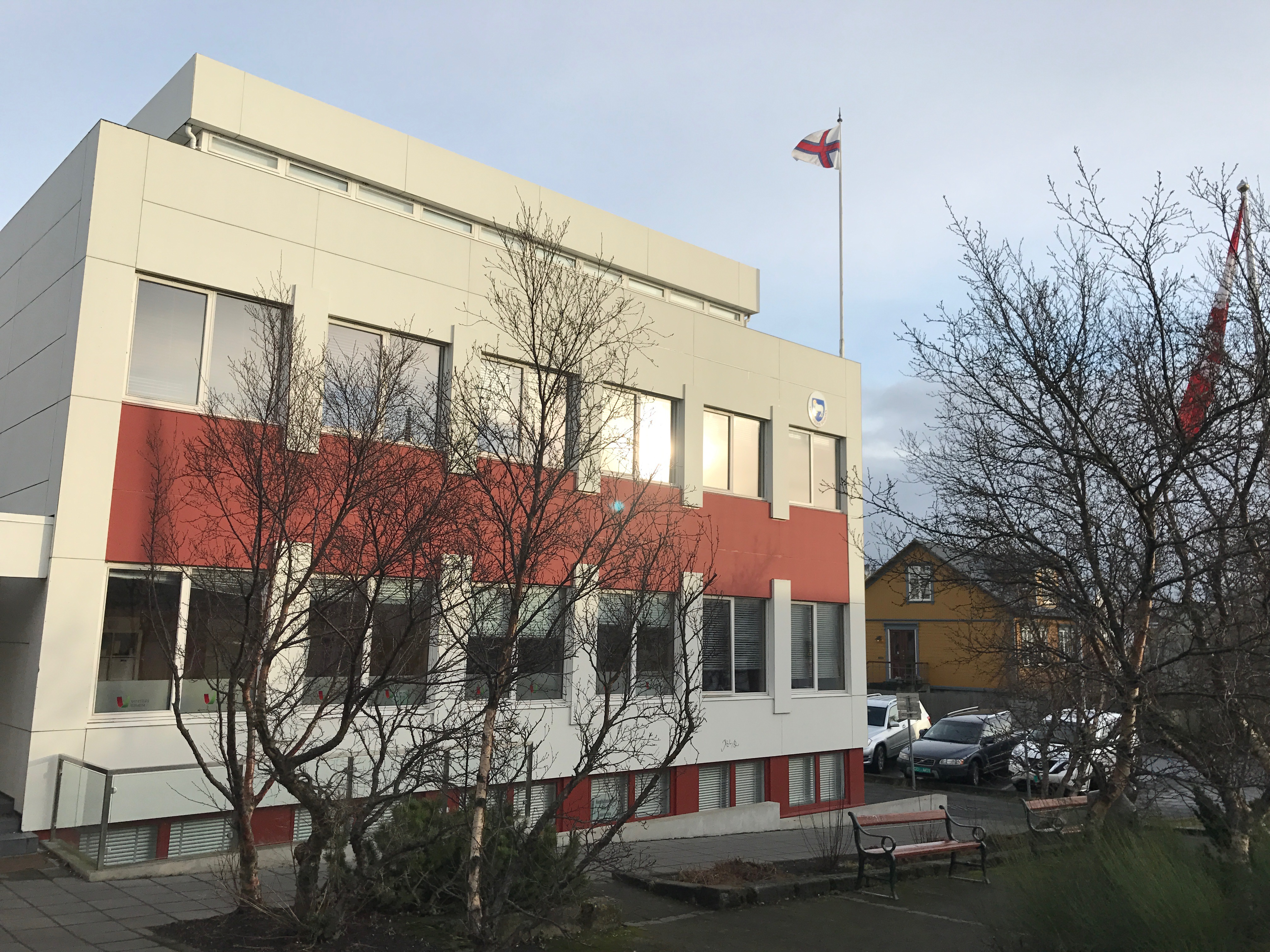
Mission of the Faroe Islands in Reykjavik, Iceland

Along with diplomatic missions to Iceland, the Court of St. James's (United Kingdom), Russia, and the European Union, the Faroe Islands participate in the Nordic Council, NIB, International Maritime Organization, International Whaling Commission (Complete list of participation of the Faroe Islands in international organisations).

== See also ==
- Cabinet of the Faroe Islands
- List of lawmen and prime ministers of the Faroe Islands
- Politics of Denmark
- List of high commissioners of the Faroe Islands
