= Faroese independence movement =

Political movement seeking independence of the Faroe Islands from Denmark

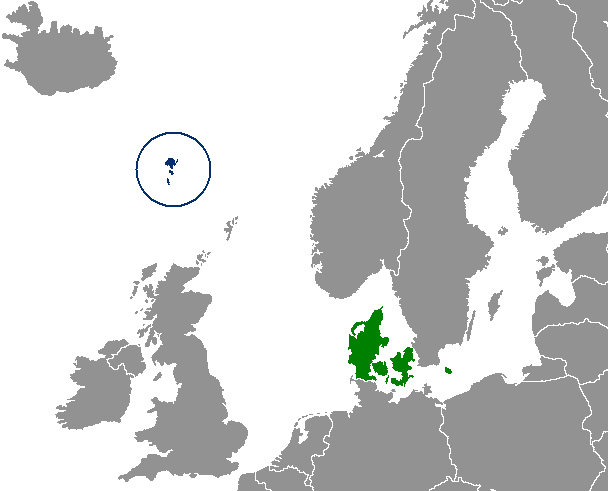
Faroe Islands (circled) Denmark

The Faroese independence movement (Faroese: Føroyska tjóðskaparrørslan), or the Faroese national movement or (Faroese nationalism) (Føroyska sjálvstýrisrørslan), is a political movement which seeks the establishment of the Faroe Islands as a sovereign state outside of Denmark. Reasons for independence include the linguistic and cultural divide between Denmark and the Faroe Islands as well as their lack of proximity to one another; the Faroe Islands are about 990 km (620 mi) from Danish shores.

== History of sovereignty ==
=== Pre-Denmark ===
Norsemen settled the islands around 800 AD, bringing the Old Norse language that evolved into the modern Faroese language. These settlers are not thought to have come directly from Scandinavia, but rather from Norse communities surrounding the Irish Sea, Northern Isles and Western Isles of Scotland, including the Shetland and Orkney islands, and Norse-Gaels. A traditional name for the islands in the Irish language, Na Scigirí, means 'the Skeggjar' and possibly refers to the Eyja-Skeggjar ('island-beards'), a nickname given to the island dwellers.

According to Færeyinga Saga, persons who did not approve of the monarchy of Harald I of Norway left Norway. These people settled the Faroes around the end of the 9th century. It is thus officially held that the islands' Nordic language and culture are derived from the early Norwegians. The islands were a possession of the Kingdom of Norway (872–1397) from 1035 until their incorporation into Denmark.

=== Under Danish rule ===
The flag of the Faroe Islands was designed by Faeroese students in Copenhagen in 1919

The islands have been ruled, with brief interruptions, by the Danish government since 1388, all the time being part of Norway up until 1814. Although the state of Denmark–Norway was thoroughly divided by the Treaty of Kiel of 1814, the Faroe Islands remained in Danish hands. A series of discriminatory policies were put in place soon after the treaty; the Faroese parliament, the Løgting was abolished in 1816 along with the post of Prime Minister of the Faroe Islands. The aforementioned offices were replaced by a Danish judiciary. Concurrently, the usage of the Faroese language was generally discouraged and Danish was instilled as the official language of the region.

The renewed Danish Constitution of 1849 granted the Faroese two seats in the Danish Parliament Rigsdagen. 1852 saw the restoration of the Løgting, albeit merely as an 18-member consultative body to the Danish authorities.

The nationalist fervor has its roots in late 19th century, established initially as a cultural and political movement which struggled for the rights of using the Faroese language in the schools, the church, in media and in the legislature. The designated start is believed to be the Christmas Meeting of 1888, which was held on December 22, 1888 in the Løgting (parliament) in Tórshavn. Two of the persons who participated were Jóannes Patursson and Rasmus Effersøe. Patursson had written a poem which Effersøe read aloud, the first line starts: Nú er tann stundin komin til handa, which is often cited in support of the movement. The poem was about preserving and taking care of the Faroese language; over the years it has gained a strong cultural footing in the Faroe Islands. The Faroese language was not allowed to be used in the Faroese public schools as a teaching language until 1938, and in the church (Fólkakirkjan) until 1939.

Young students who studied in Denmark played a prominent role in the nationalist movement. The Faroese Merkið flag was designed in 1919 by Faroese students in Copenhagen. Prior to the Merkið's utilization, there were other flags which some of the Faroese people identified themselves with, one was a flag featuring a ram and one was a flag with a tjaldur.

Denmark was occupied by Nazi Germany as part of the Second World War on April 9, 1940. The United Kingdom, viewing the Faroe Islands as strategically valuable, began a military occupation of the islands in order to thwart further German conquest of Danish territory. This effectively put the Faroe Islands under British administration until the conclusion of the war in 1945. Under British rule the Merkið was recognized as the official flag of the Faroes so that authorities could discern what vessels were Faroese fishing boats and which were hostile.

== Status of autonomy ==
In the status quo, the Faroe Islands is an autonomous area of the Kingdom of Denmark, sharing this distinction with Greenland. In response to growing calls for autonomy, the Home Rule Act of the Faroe Islands was passed on March 23, 1948, cementing the latter's status as a self-governing country within Kingdom of Denmark. The Act has also allowed the vast majority of domestic affairs to be ceded to the Faroese government, with the Danish government only responsible for military defence, police, justice, currency and foreign affairs. The Faroe Islands are not part of the European Union. The Faroe Islands also have their own national football team and are a full member of FIFA and UEFA.

== Political solutions ==
=== Organisations ===
Schematic depiction of the political party spectrum in the Faroe Islands. Tjóðveldi = Republic Framsókn = Progress Fólkaflokkurin = People's Party Miðflokkurin = Centre Party Sjálvstýrisflokkurin = Self-Government Party Javnaðarflokkurin = Social Democratic Party Sambandsflokkurin = Union Party

Four local political parties seek independence from Denmark: the People's Party (Hin føroyski fólkaflokkurin), Republic (Tjóðveldi), Progress (Framsókn) and Centre Party (Miðflokkurin). These parties, while spanning the political left and right, make up 19 of the Løgting's 33 seats. In addition to this is the Self-Government Party (Sjálvstýrisflokkurin) generally touts the idea of sovereignty, albeit with a more moderate fervor than the aforementioned parties.

=== 1946 referendum ===
On 14 September 1946, a referendum regarding independence was held. With a valid vote count of 11,146, 50.74% voted in favor of independence while 49.26% opted to remain associated with Denmark, leaving a difference of 166 votes between the two options. The chairman of the Løgting declared independence on 18 September; this move was not recognised by the opposition parties, and it was annulled by Denmark on 20 September. King Christian X of Denmark subsequently dissolved the Løgting; it was swiftly replaced in the parliamentary election held on 8 November, with parties favouring a union with Denmark now retaining a majority.

=== Constitutional crisis ===
The Danish and Faroese governments have consistently haggled over the drastic revision of the Faroese constitution, with many clauses clashing with those of Denmark. The conflict reached its apex in 2011, when then-Prime Minister of Denmark Lars Løkke Rasmussen declared that new edits could not coincide with the state's constitution. Rasmussen presented two options to the Faroese: secede or scrap the hypothetical constitution. Faroese Prime Minister Kaj Leo Johannesen asserted that they would begin a new draft of the constitution and remain in the Danish Realm.

In February 2017 both the ruling and opposition parties agreed on a new draft constitution, and put its ratification to a public referendum scheduled to be held in April 2018. This proposed new constitution would have included a clause that would have allowed a referendum on independence to be held, that required a simple majority to pass. However, the committee assigned to approve the constitution failed to reach a consensus on the precise wording of other aspects of the constitution, in regards to marriage equality and family law. The committee failed to make a decision before the 2019 Faroese general election, during which, unionist parties won 52% of seats in the Løgting, making it all but impossible to pass a new pro-independence constitution.

=== Nordic exclusion ===
The Faroese government again sought independence following the island's exclusion from activities of the Nordic Council in 2024 as the Swedish government which held the rotating presidency for that year decided to exclude the Faroes, Greenland, and Åland. Following Greenland's decision to boycott the council in response, the Faroes called for an amendment to the Helsinki Treaty to guarantee equal status, or the Faroes would withdraw from the council. This emboldened independence activists to heighten secession dialogue, which Danish counterparts claims is at the highest level in 20 years. The Danish and Icelandic governments have supported the reform initiatives, however, due to the Faroes being part of the Kingdom of Denmark they may not be entitled to an equal footing in the council, hence the renewed talks for Independence.

== Concerns of economic viability ==
“It's currently only the money that actually connects us to Denmark. All Faroese agree that we should have our own schools and own language. The cultural battle is over. It’s the Danish money that is the obstacle to independence.”

— Høgni Hoydal, Faroese MP and leader of the Republic Party.

Although they enjoy a significant amount of autonomy from Denmark, the Faroe Islands still regularly rely on US$99.8 million of government subsidies to keep their economy stable; in 1992 a banking decline of 25% sent the economy into a period of stagnation and 15% of the population to mainland Denmark. Financial support from the Danish government takes up 4.6% of the Faroese gross domestic product and accounts for 10-12% of the public budget.

Norwegian oil and gas company Equinor took interest in the prospects of oil in the waters off of the Faroe Islands, embarking on an estimated US$166.46 million oil exploration operation in 2012. ExxonMobil and Atlantic Petroleum also hold stakes in the drilling platforms being installed in Faroese waters. If these operations succeeded and found the bountiful projected amounts of oil (US$568,500 worth per each resident out of the Faroese population of 49,000) the prospect of independence may have received a boost. However, after drilling four exploration wells around the islands, Equinor gave up on oil exploration in the region in 2015; no drilling activity has taken place since then, though Faroese Minister of Trade and Industry Jacob Vestergaard has been making efforts to attract oil companies back to the islands as of August 2026.

== See also ==
- Constitution of Denmark
- Danish Realm
- Greenlandic independence
- Icelandic independence movement
- Norwegian independence movement
- List of active separatist movements in Europe
