= Fía Selma Nielsen =

Faroese politician (born 1986)

Member of the Faroese Parliament
- Incumbent
- Assumed office 30 April 2025

Personal details
- Born: 1986 (age 39–40)
- Party: People's Party

Fía Selma Nielsen (born 1986) (Note: Source states that she was 39 in April 2025) is a Faroese politician from the People's Party.

== Biography ==
Nielsen ran in the 2022 Faroese general election. She took her seat in 2025. She replaced Árni Skaale. In the 2026 Faroese general election, she represented her party in a debate.
