= Bárður =

Bárður (Icelandic pronunciation: [ˈpaurðʏr̥]) or Bardur is a Nordic masculine given name that derives from the Old Norse name Bárðr [ˈbɑːrðr]. Notable people with the name include:

- Bárður Eyþórsson (born 1968), Icelandic basketball coach and player
- Bárður Háberg (born 1979), Faroese musician, songwriter and composer
- Bárður Hansen (born 1992), Faroese footballer
- Bárður á Lakjuni (born 1978), Faroese politician
- Bárður Oskarsson (born 1972), Faroese children's writer, illustrator and artist
- Bárður á Reynatrøð (born 2000), Faroese footballer
- Bárður á Steig Nielsen (born 1972), Faroese politician and businessman
