= Cabinet of Edmund Joensen II =

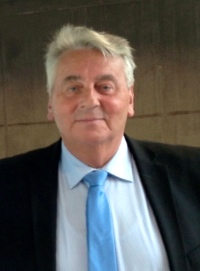
Edmund Joensen

The second cabinet of Edmund Joensen was the government of the Faroe Islands from 11 June 1996 until 15 May 1998, with Edmund Joensen from Sambandsflokkurin (SB) as Prime Minister. The other parties of the coalition were: People's Party (Fólkaflokkurin) (FF), Workers' Union (Verkamannafylkingin) (VMF) og Self-Government Party (Sjálvstýrisflokkurin) (SF). The Self-Government Party, with Sámal Petur í Grund as minister, left the government on 1 December 1997.

	Minister	Party	From	Until
Prime Minister	Edmund Joensen	Union Party	11 June 1996	15 May 1998
Ministry	Minister	Party	From	Until
Ministry of Environment-, Energy, School and Municipalities	Eilif Samuelsen	Union Party	11 June 1996	15 May 1998
Ministry of Trade, Industry and Agriculture	Ivan Johannesen	Union Party	11 June 1996	15 May 1998
Ministry of Finance and Economy	Anfinn Kallsberg	People's Party	11 June 1996	15 May 1998
Ministry of Fisheries	John Petersen	People's Party	11 June 1996	15 May 1998
Ministry of Social, Health, Labour, Safety and Justice	Óli Jacobsen	Workers' Union	March 1998	15 May 1998
	Kristian Magnussen	Workers' Union	October 1996	March 1998
	Axel H. Nolsøe	Workers' Union	11 June 1996	October 1996
Ministry of Communication, Culture, Tourism and Aquaculture	Sámal Petur í Grund	Self-Government Party	11 June 1996	1 December 1997
