= Christian Andreasen (politician) =

Faroese lawyer, football administrator and politician (born 1959)

President of the Faroe Islands Football Association
- Incumbent
- Assumed office 27 February 2010
- Preceded by: Høgni í Stórustovu

Leader of the People's Party
- In office 18 March 2022 – 10 November 2022
- Preceded by: Jørgen Niclasen
- Succeeded by: Beinir Johannesen

Member of Parliament
- In office 31 August 2019 – 8 December 2022

Personal details
- Born: 10 December 1959 (age 66) Toftir, Faroe Islands
- Party: People's Party (Fólkaflokkurin)

Christian Fribjart Andreasen (born 10 December 1959) is a Faroese lawyer, football administrator and politician. Since 2010, he has been president of the Faroe Islands Football Association. He also served as a member of the Faroese parliament, the Løgting, from 2019 to 2022.

== Early life and career ==
Andreasen was born in Toftir on 10 December 1959, the son of John Svenning Andreasen and his wife Hallgerð Olsen. He holds a matriculation examination from the Føroya Studentaskúli og HF-Skeið in Tórshavn, a law degree from the University of Copenhagen and is a member of the Danish Supreme Court. He is a lawyer and partner in what was originally Leif Waagstein's law firm in Tórshavn. Andreasen has also been chairman of Atlantic Airways, the construction company J&K Petersen and Tórshavn's largest shopping mall, SMS.

== Administrative roles ==
Andreasen was elected head of the Faroe Islands Football Association (FSF) on 27 February 2010 with 11 votes to 8 in an election against former president Høgni í Stórustovu. He was re-elected president of the federation on 24 February 2021, having done so in 2013 and 2017. In addition to being president/chairman of the FSF, he is also a trustee in both UEFA and FIFA. He himself played as a goalkeeper for B68 Toftir in his youth.

== Political career ==
Andreasen was a member of the Faroese Parliament from 2019 to 2022, representing the People's Party. He was chairman of both the Parliament's Justice Committee and the Parliament's Control Committee. When the party entered government after the 2019 parliamentary election, Andreasen was elected chairman of the party's parliamentary group. In March 2022, he took over as party chairman, but resigned after the parliamentary election in November of that year, as he did not believe he had received support for necessary changes in the party. He also declined to be renominated to the Parliament.
