= Framsókn =

Framsókn may refer to:

- Progressive Party (Iceland) (Framsóknarflokkurinn)
- Progress (Faroe Islands) Political party in the Faroe Islands (Framsókn)
