= List of deputy prime ministers of the Faroe Islands =

The office of Deputy Prime Minister of the Faroe Islands (Faroese: varaløgmaður) is held by one of the ministers of the Faroese government. The deputy prime minister is acting as prime minister when the prime minister is on leave.

Period	Name	Portrait	Party	Constituency	Employment	Years of living
1948–1950	Louis Zachariasen		Sjálvstýrisflokkurin	Southstreymoy	Manager	1890–1960
1950–1951	Thorstein Petersen		Fólkaflokkurin	Southstreymoy	Managing director	1899–1960
1951–1954	Rikard Long		Fólkaflokkurin	Southstreymoy	Teacher	1889–1977
1954–1957	Hákun Djurhuus		Fólkaflokkurin	Norðoyar	Teacher	1908–1987
1957–1959	Óla Jákup Jensen		Fólkaflokkurin	Northstreymoy	Merchant	1898–1991
1959–1963	Kristian Djurhuus		Sambandsflokkurin	Suðuroy	District magistrate	1895–1984
1963–1967	Niels Winther Poulsen		Sjálvstýrisflokkurin	Sandoy	Teacher	1902–1990
1967–1968	Kristian Djurhuus		Sambandsflokkurin	Suðuroy	District magistrate	1895–1984
1968–1970	Jacob Lindenskov		Javnaðarflokkurin	Southstreymoy	Insurance agent	1933–2018
1970–1975	Peter F. Christiansen		Sambandsflokkurin	Southstreymoy	Manager	1923–2012
1975–1979	Finnbogi Ísakson		Tjóðveldisflokkurin	Norðoyar	Journalist	1943–2005
1981–1983	Olaf Olsen		Fólkaflokkurin	Eysturoy	Businessman	1935–
1983–1985	Anfinn Kallsberg		Fólkaflokkurin	Norðoyar	Accountant	1947–2024
1985–1989	Jógvan Durhuus		Tjóðveldisflokkurin	Northstreymoy	Postman	1938–2026
1989–1991	Signar Hansen		Tjóðveldisflokkurin	Eysturoy	Teacher	1945–
1991–1993	Jógvan Sundstein		Fólkaflokkurin	Southstreymoy	Chartered accountant	1933–2024
1993–1994	Finnbogi Ísakson		Tjóðveldisflokkurin	Southstreymoy	Journalist	1943–2005
1994–1996	Jóannes Eidesgaard		Javnaðarflokkurin	Suðuroy	Teacher	1951–
1998–2004	Høgni Hoydal		Tjóðveldisflokkurin	Southstreymoy	Journalist	1966–
2004–2008	Bjarni Djurholm		Fólkaflokkurin	Southstreymoy	Teacher	1957–
2008	Høgni Hoydal		Tjóðveldi	Southstreymoy	Journalist	1966–
2008–2011	Jørgen Niclasen		Fólkaflokkurin	Vágar	Businessman	1969–
2011	Jacob Vestergaard		Fólkaflokkurin	Suðuroy	Policeman	1961–
2011	Aksel V. Johannesen		Javnaðarflokkurin	Norðoyar	Lawyer	1972–
2011–2015	Annika Olsen		Fólkaflokkurin	Southstreymoy	Teacher	1975–
2015–2019	Høgni Hoydal		Tjóðveldi	Southstreymoy	Journalist	1966–
2019–2022	Jørgen Niclasen		Fólkaflokkurin	Vágar	Businessman	1969–
2022	Uni Rasmussen		Fólkaflokkurin	Eysturoy	Businessman	1968–
2022–2026	Høgni Hoydal		Tjóðveldi	Southstreymoy	Journalist	1966–
2026–present	Bárður á Steig Nielsen		Sambandsflokkurin	Weststreymoy	Businessman	1972–

== See also ==
- Politics of the Faroe Islands
- List of prime ministers of the Faroe Islands
