= Gilli (Løgmaður) =

Faroese politician

Gilli (also known as Gille) was the first known Lawman (or Lawspeaker) of the Faroe Islands. He served in that capacity beginning around 1000, and continuing until an unknown date. In 1024, Gille, along with other Faroese leaders, were pressed by King Olaf II of Norway to swear an oath to follow King Olaf's laws and pay Norwegian taxes.

Gilli is mentioned several times in the Færeyinga saga.

Political offices
Unknown	Lawman of the Faroe Islands; 1000–?	Succeeded by Sjúrður
