= Sjúrður =

Lawman of Shetland around the year 1300

Sjúrður (or Sigurd), was, around the year 1300, lawman of Shetland and was also possibly lawman of the Faeroe Islands.

Sjúrður was, together with Bishop Erlendur, co-author of the Faeroese Seyðabrævið in 1298 - a document with land use rules for the Faeroe Islands, and the Faeroes' oldest document.

Political offices
Preceded by Gilli	Lawman of the Faroe Islands c.a. 1300-?.?.	Succeeded by Símun
