= List of ministers of social affairs of the Faroe Islands =

The minister of social affairs (Faroese language: landsstýrismaðurin í almannamálum, also called Almannamálaráðharrin) has been a governmental ministerial post since 1968 in the government of the Faroe Islands.

Period	Name	Party
1968–1975	Jacob Lindenskov	Social Democratic Party
1975–1979	Finnbogi Ísakson	Republic
1979	Jacob Lindenskov	Social Democratic Party
1979–1981	Vilhelm Johannesen	Social Democratic Party
1981–1985	Eilif Samuelsen	Union Party
1985–1988	Niels Pauli Danielsen	Christian People's Party
1988–1989	Karolina Petersen	Progress Party
1989	Tordur Niclasen	Christian People's Party
1991–1994	Jóannes Eidesgaard	Social Democratic Party
1994–1996	Andrias Petersen	Social Democratic Party
1996	Axel H. Nolsøe	Workers' Union
1996–1998	Kristian Magnussen	Workers' Union
1998	Óli Jacobsen	Workers' Union
1998–2001	Helena Dam á Neystabø	Self-Government Party
2001–2002	Sámal Petur í Grund	Self-Government Party
2002–2003	Páll á Reynatúgvu	Republic
2004–2008	Hans Pauli Strøm	Social Democratic Party
2008–2011	Rósa Samuelsen	Union Party
2011–2015	Annika Olsen	People's Party
2015–2019	Eyðgunn Samuelsen	Social Democratic Party
2019–	Elsebeth Mercedis Gunnleygsdóttur	People's Party
