= List of lawmen and prime ministers of the Faroe Islands =

Prime Minister of the Faroe Islands
- Føroya løgmaður
- Coat of arms of the Faroe Islands

- Flag of the Faroe Islands
- Incumbent; Beinir Johannesen since 13 April 2026
- Cabinet of the Faroe Islands; Government of the Faroe Islands
- Member of: Løgting
- Formation: c. 1000; 12 May 1948; 78 years ago
- First holder: Gilli (historic); Andrass Samuelsen
- Deputy: Deputy Prime Minister

The prime minister of the Faroe Islands is the head of government of the Faroe Islands.

The Faroese term løgmaður (plural: løgmenn) literally means "lawman" and originally referred to the legal function of lawspeaker. This old title was brought back into use to refer to the head of government after the islands obtained Home Rule in 1948. In recent decades the Faroese government has started using "Prime Minister" as the official English translation of løgmaður, reflecting the increased autonomy of the islands. This translation does not apply to the pre-1816 office, only the modern leaders of the Faroese government.

== List of Løgmenn ==
=== Løgmenn as lawmen (c. 1000–1816) ===
Many of the earlier holders of this position are not known.

Name	Born–Died	Term of Office
Gilli		c. 1000
Sjúrður		c. 1300
Símun		c. 1350
Dagfinnur Halvdanarson		c. 1400
Haraldur Kálvsson		c. 1412
Roald		c. 1450
Jørundur Skógdrívsson		1479–1524
Tórmóður Sigurðsson		1524–1531
Andras Guttormsson	c. 1490–1543	1531–1544
Guttormur Andrasson	Died 1572	1544–1572
Jógvan Heinason	1541–1602	1572–1583
Ísak Guttormsson	Died 1587	1583–1588
Pætur Jákupsson		1588–1601
Tummas Símunarson	Died 1608	1601–1608
Zakarias Tormóðsson	Died 1628	1608–1628
Jógvan Justinusson	Died 1654	1629–1654
Jógvan Poulsen (1st time)		1654–1655
Balzer Jacobsen		1655–1661
Jógvan Poulsen (2nd time)		1662–1677
Jákup Jógvansson		1677–1679
Jóhan Hendrik Weyhe		1679–1706
Sámal Pætursson Lamhauge	Died 1752	1706–1752
Hans Jákupsson Debes	1723–1769	1752–1769
Thorkild Fjeldsted	1741–1796	1769–1772
Jacob Hveding		1772–1786
Johan Michael Lund	1753–1824	1786–1808
Jørgen Frantz Hammershaimb	1767–1820	1808–1816

=== Løgmenn as Prime Ministers during the Home Rule era (1948–present) ===
No.	Portrait	Name	Term of office			Party	Election	Cabinet
No.	Portrait	Name	Took office	Left office	Time in office	Party	Election	Cabinet
1		Andrass Samuelsen (1873–1954)	12 May 1948	15 December 1950	2 years, 217 days	Union Party	1946	Samuelsen
2		Kristian Djurhuus (1895–1984)	15 December 1950	8 January 1959	8 years, 24 days	Union Party	1950; 1954	Djurhuus I–II
3		Peter Mohr Dam (1898–1968)	8 January 1959	4 January 1963	3 years, 361 days	Social Democratic Party	1958	
4		Hákun Djurhuus (1908–1987)	4 January 1963	12 January 1967	4 years, 8 days	People's Party	1962	
(3)		Peter Mohr Dam (1898–1968)	12 January 1967	19 November 1968	1 year, 312 days	Social Democratic Party	1966	
(2)		Kristian Djurhuus (1895–1984)	19 November 1968	12 December 1970	2 years, 23 days	Union Party	1966	
5		Atli Dam (1932–2005)	12 December 1970	5 January 1981	10 years, 24 days	Social Democratic Party	1970; 1974; 1978	
6		Pauli Ellefsen (1936–2012)	5 January 1981	10 January 1985	4 years, 5 days	Union Party	1980	
(5)		Atli Dam (1932–2005)	10 January 1985	18 January 1989	4 years, 8 days	Social Democratic Party	1984	
7		Jógvan Sundstein (1933–2024)	18 January 1989	15 January 1991	1 year, 362 days	People's Party	1988	
(5)		Atli Dam (1932–2005)	15 January 1991	18 January 1993	2 years, 3 days	Social Democratic Party	1990	
8		Marita Petersen (1940–2001)	18 January 1993	15 September 1994	1 year, 240 days	Social Democratic Party	1990	
9		Edmund Joensen (1944– )	15 September 1994	15 May 1998	3 years, 242 days	Union Party	1994	Joensen I–II
10		Anfinn Kallsberg (1947–2024)	15 May 1998	3 February 2004	5 years, 264 days	People's Party	1998; 2002	Kallsberg I–II
11		Jóannes Eidesgaard (1951– )	3 February 2004	26 September 2008	4 years, 236 days	Social Democratic Party	2004	Eidesgaard I–II
12		Kaj Leo Johannesen (1964– )	26 September 2008	15 September 2015	6 years, 354 days	Union Party	2008; 2011	Leo Johannesen I–II
13		Aksel V. Johannesen (1972– )	15 September 2015	16 September 2019	4 years, 1 day	Social Democratic Party	2015	Aksel Johannesen I
14		Bárður á Steig Nielsen (1972– )	16 September 2019	22 December 2022	3 years, 97 days	Union Party	2019	Steig Nielsen
(13)		Aksel V. Johannesen (1972– )	22 December 2022	13 April 2026	3 years, 112 days	Social Democratic Party	2022	Aksel Johannesen II
15		Beinir Johannesen (1997– )	13 April 2026	Incumbent	166 days	People's Party	2026	Beinir Johannesen

== Timeline since 1948 ==
This is a graphical lifespan timeline of prime ministers of the Faroe Islands. They are listed in order of office (those who served multiple terms are shown in order of their first).

== See also ==
- Politics of the Faroe Islands
- List of deputy prime ministers of the Faroe Islands
- Prime Minister of Denmark
- Prime Minister of Greenland
