= Bjarni K. Petersen =

Faroese politician (born 1994)

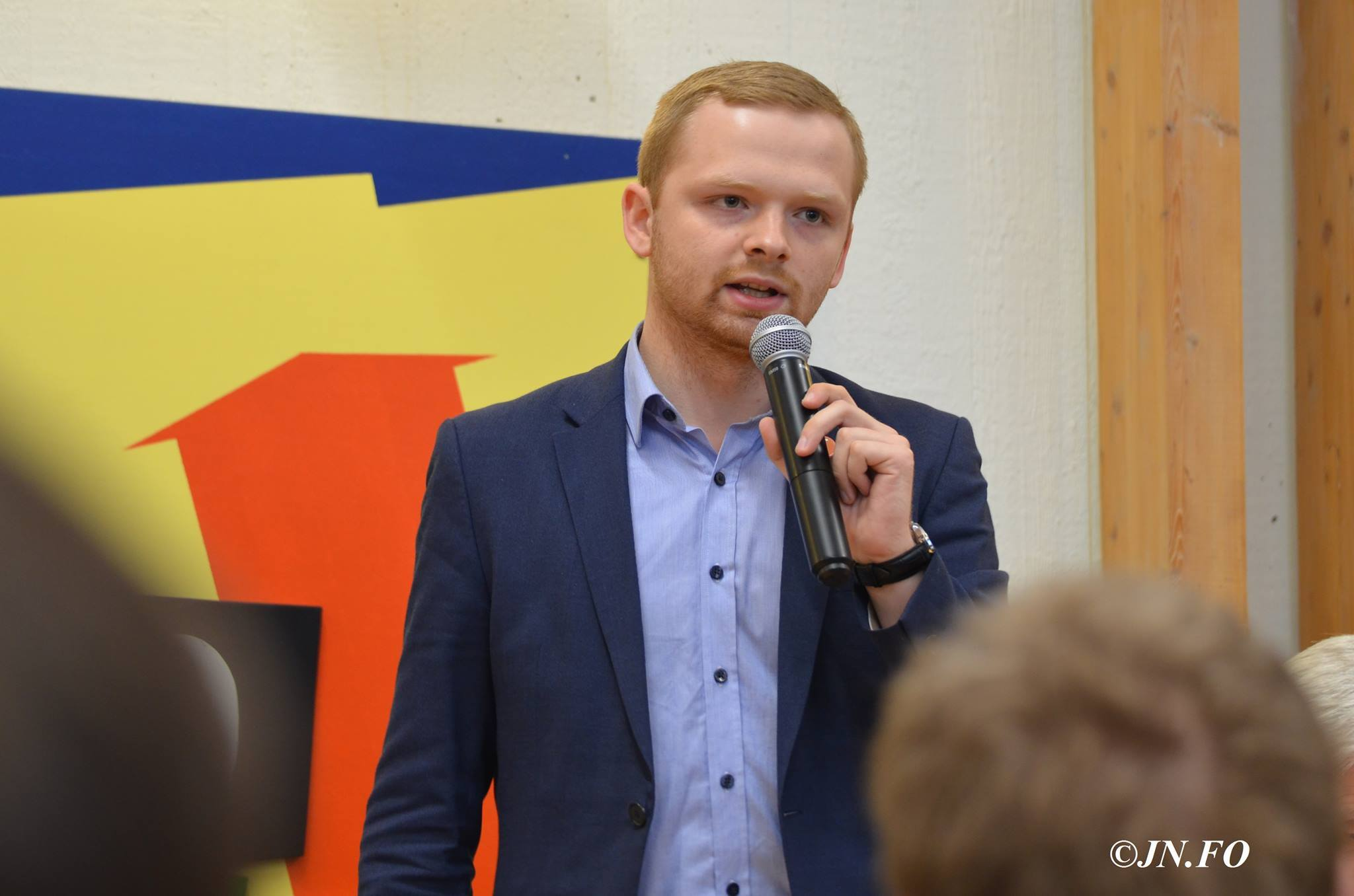
- Petersen in 2015

Minister of Justice and Internal Affairs
- In office 22 December 2022 – 1 December 2025
- Prime Minister: Aksel V. Johannesen

Personal details
- Born: 14 August 1994 (age 31)
- Party: Progress

Bjarni Kárason Petersen (born 14 August 1994) is a Faroese politician serving as a member of the Løgting since 2019. From 2022 to 2025, he served as minister of justice and internal affairs.
