= Annika Olsen =

Faroese politician

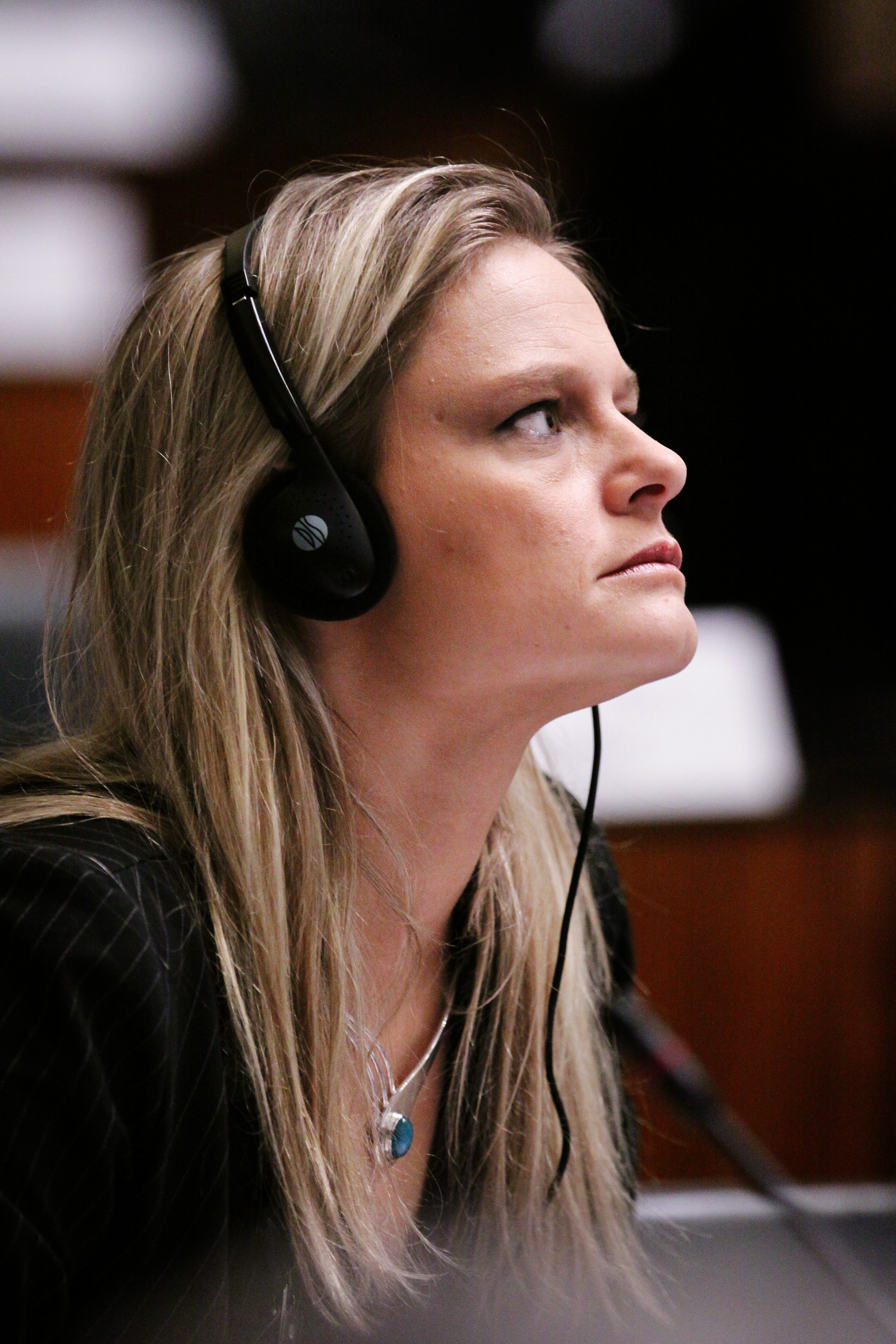

Deputy Prime Minister of the Faroe Islands
- In office 14 November 2011 – 15 September 2015
- Prime Minister: Kaj Leo Johannesen
- Preceded by: Aksel V. Johannesen
- Succeeded by: Høgni Hoydal

Minister of Social Affairs of the Faroe Islands
- In office 14 November 2011 – 15 September 2015
- Prime Minister: Kaj Leo Johannesen
- Preceded by: Rósa Samuelsen
- Succeeded by: Eyðgunn Samuelsen

Minister of Internal Affairs of the Faroe Islands
- In office 26 September 2008 – 6 April 2011
- Prime Minister: Kaj Leo Johannesen
- Preceded by: Helena Dam á Neystabø
- Succeeded by: John Johannessen

Member of Parliament
- Incumbent
- Assumed office 2 February 2008

Mayor of Tórshavn
- In office 1 January 2017 – 1 January 2021
- Preceded by: Heðin Mortensen
- Succeeded by: Heðin Mortensen

Personal details
- Born: 13 March 1975 (age 51) Tórshavn, Faroe Islands
- Party: Republic (since 14 November 2022)
- Other political affiliations: People's Party (until 11 November 2022), Progress (17 - 20 September 2015 only)
- Spouse: Jacob Horn Nielsen
- Children: 2

Annika Jacobina Olsen (born 13 March 1975, in Tórshavn, grew up in Vágur) is a Faroese politician, high school teacher and former swimmer. She was Deputy Prime Minister and Minister of Social Affairs in the Faroe Islands (2011–15) and Minister of Internal Affairs from 2008 to 2011 representing the People's Party (Faroe Islands). Before that she was a member of the City Council of Tórshavn from 2004 to 2008. Annika Olsen has an MA in Nordic languages and literature with a supplementary subject in religion. She is the daughter of Jákup Olsen, a businessman, former politician and former headmaster of Vágur's School and Marna Olsen, born Holm, a retired teacher.

At the general election 2015, the People's Party lost two seats in the Faroese parliament, they got 18.9% of the votes and 6 members. Annika Olsen got second most votes of the party's candidates. Eight days after the election, Olsen (who had received 961 personal votes) left the People's Party. This meant that the party lost one member and now has 5 parliament members. On 17 September she joined the Liberal party Progress, which is part of the governing coalition. She was subsequently elected as chairman of the Fiscal committee. Three days later, she stated that she regretted the decision and left Progress, also saying she would not be chairman of the Fiscal committee and that she needed some time alone with her family. She took leave from the parliament. She asked the people who elected her to forgive her, and said that she had had too little time to think before changing parties.

On 4 February 2016 she became a member of the People's Party again.

On 11 November 2022, Annika Olsen announced that she is leaving the People's Party due to policy disagreements and internal struggles. On 14 November 2022, it was announced that she is running in the general election as a member of Republic. She was elected to parliament in the election with 335 personal votes.

She serves as Vice-chair of the Committee on Industry Affairs, and a member of the Foreign Affairs Committee.

== Swimming career ==
Between 1988 and 1995 Annika Olsen was a member of the Faroese national swimming team. She attended the Island Games in 1991 and won a bronze medal in 200 m breast, bronze in 4x50 m free, bronze in 4 × 100 m free and silver in 8x50 m free. She also attended the Island Games 1989 in the Faroe Islands.
