= Ingilín D. Strøm =

Faroese politician (born 1991)

Ingilín D Strøm

Minister of Environment
- In office 22 December 2022 – 24 October 2024
- Prime Minister: Aksel V. Johannesen

Personal details
- Born: Ingilín Didriksen Strøm; 22 August 1991 (age 35)
- Party: JF
- Spouse: Teitur Lassen

Ingilín Didriksen Strøm (born 22 August 1991) is a Faroese politician of the Social Democratic Party. In the 2019 general election, she was elected to the Løgting for the first time.

== Biography ==
Strøm ran for parliament for the first time and was elected to parliament in the elections on 31 August 2019. She received 543 personal votes and became second in parliament for the Social Democratic Party, just behind Aksel V. Johannesen. Strøm was the woman who received the most personal votes in the election and she was the only woman elected to the Løgting for the Social Democratic Party. Her core goals are, among other things, to put the environment at the highest level, to improve care work and not least to ensure strong social systems, where no one can fall apart.

Strøm comes from a red Social Democratic home in Vestmanna, where political interest and a sense of responsibility for the outside world have been a large part of her upbringing and life as a whole. She is the daughter of Faroese politician Hans Pauli Strøm and Gyðja Hjalmarsdóttir Didriksen. Ingilín completed her International Baccalaureate at UWC Red Cross Nordic in Norway. After living and working in Addis Ababa and Copenhagen, Strøm and her husband Teitur Lassen and son moved back to Faroe Islands, and embarked on a degree in Faroese at the Icelandic Academy of Sciences. She married Lassen in 2016.

In 2025 Strøm was one of four members of the Løgting to introduce a successful bill to legalise abortion until the end of the 12th week of pregnancy, overturning previous restrictions that meant the Faroe Islands had amongst the strictest abortion laws in Europe. Strøm told the BBC that "This is truly an historic day in the Faroe Islands. This change finally affirms women's autonomy over their own bodies in the Faroe Islands."
