= Eyðgunn Samuelsen =

Faroese teacher and politician

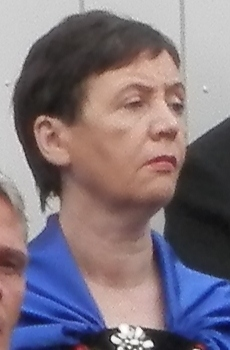
- Eyðgunn Samuelsen, 2012

Minister of Social Affairs
- Incumbent
- Assumed office 15 September 2015
- Preceded by: Annika Olsen

Member of Parliament
- Incumbent
- Assumed office 8 February 2008

Personal details
- Born: 23 May 1959 (age 67) Sørvágur, Faroe Islands
- Party: Social Democratic Party (Javnaðarflokkurin)

Eyðgunn Jana Samuelsen (née Henriksen, 23 May 1959 in Sørvágur) is a Faroese teacher and politician (Social Democratic Party (Javnaðarflokkurin)).

== Background ==
Samuelsen graduated from her lower secondary school in Sørvágs skúli in 1976 and graduated from her high school (HF) Føroya Studentaskúli og HF-Skeið in 1978. Samuelsen took a degree in economics and history (cand.mag.) from Roskilde University in 1992.

She grew up in the small town, Sørvágur, with her father, mother and younger sister.

== Political career ==
She joined the Social Democratic Party in 1988. She was elected in the town council of Klaksvík for the first time in 1997. She has been a member of the Faroese parliament since 8 February 2008, the first years from 2008-2011 she was not directly elected but became a member when Helena Dam á Neystabø became minister. At the 2011 elections she was elected to the parliament and in 2015 she was reelected with 433 personal votes which was third most on her parties list.
