= Helgi Abrahamsen =

Faroese journalist and politician

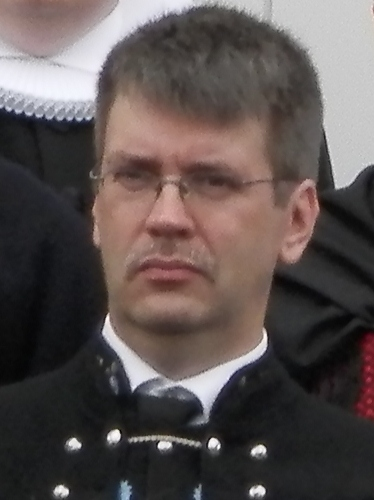

Member of the Løgting
- In office 2008–2015
- Incumbent
- Assumed office 2022

Minister of Trade and Industry
- In office 16 September 2019 – 19 August 2021
- Prime Minister: Bárður á Steig Nielsen
- Preceded by: Poul Michelsen
- Succeeded by: Magnus Rasmussen

Personal details
- Born: 24 November 1966 (age 59) Fuglafjørður, Faroe Islands
- Party: Union Party
- Spouse: Oddbjørg Abrahamsen
- Children: 3
- Education: Danish School of Media and Journalism

Helgi Abrahamsen (born 24 November 1966) is a Faroese journalist and politician of the conservative-liberal Union Party. He was a member of Løgting from 2008 to 2015. He lost his seat in the 2015 election but was re-elected in 2019. He was the Minister of Environment, Industry and Trade from 2019 until he stepped down and was replaced by Magnus Rasmussen in 2021.
