= Elsebeth Mercedis Gunnleygsdóttur =

Faroese politician

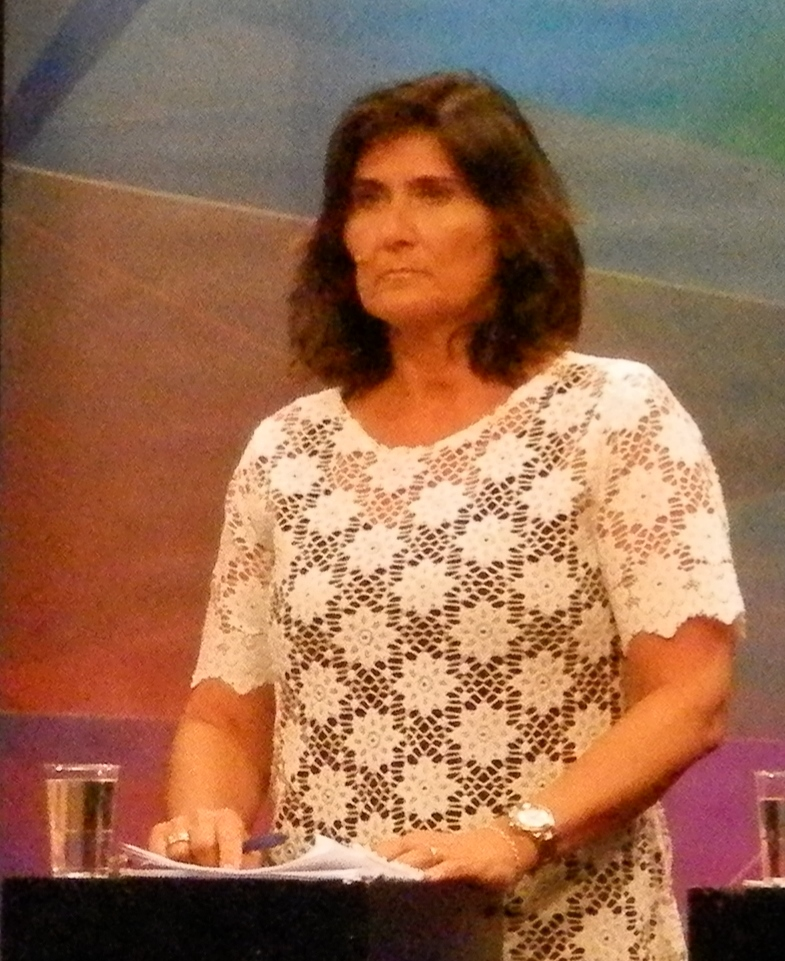

Member of Parliament
- Incumbent
- Assumed office 2011
- Constituency: Norðoyar

Personal details
- Born: 26 October 1963 (age 62) Klaksvík, Faroe Islands
- Party: People's Party
- Children: 3

Elsebeth Mercedis Gunnleygsdóttur (born 26 October 1963) is a Faroese policewoman and politician of the conservative People's Party. She has been a member of Løgting since 2011.

== Career ==
Gunnleygsdóttur worked for two years (1983-85) as an assistant at Postverk Føroya. She then began training with the police.

=== Politics ===
Gunnleygsdóttur has been sitting in the town council of her home town of Klaksvík since 2009. She also sat in various committees.

At the end of October 2011, she was elected to Løgting with 344 personal voices. She was chairman of the Judiciary Committee and was also a member of the Committee on Welfare.

In the elections to the Løgting on 1 September 2015 she was reelected with 371 personal votes. She was again re-elected in 2019 with 461 votes. And subsequently once more in 2022 with 376 votes.After Annika Olsen's resignation, she is the only female parliamentarian in her party.

She now serves as the 4th seat chair of parliament, and serves on the Judiciary Committee.

== Personal life ==
Gunnleygsdóttur, who is daughter of Ellinor Maria and Gunnleyður Jakobsen is married to Finn Hansen. The couple have three children.
