= Jørgen Niclasen =

Faroese politician (born 1969)

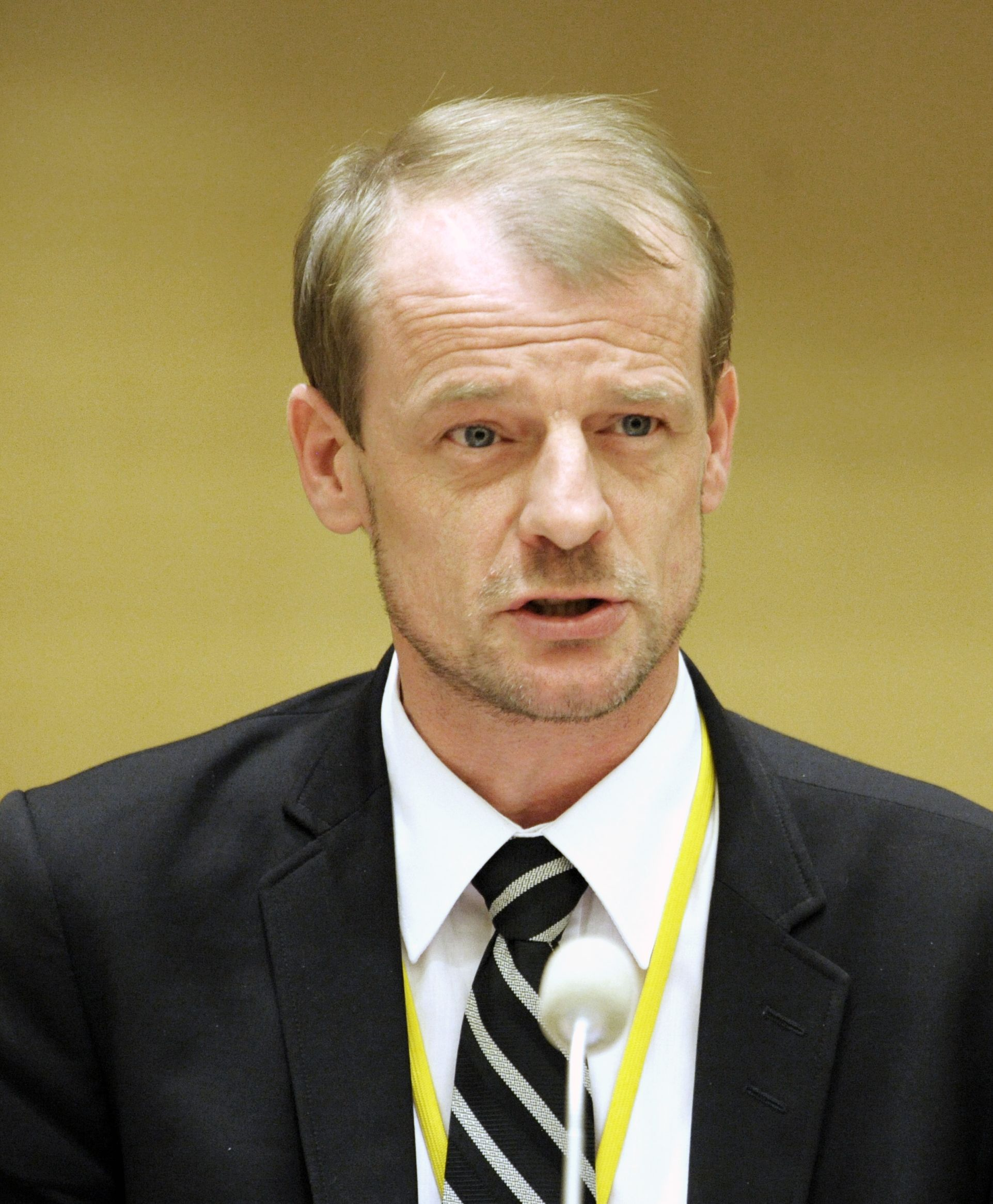

Deputy Prime Minister of the Faroe Islands
- In office 16 September 2019 – 16 February 2022
- Prime Minister: Bárður á Steig Nielsen
- Preceded by: Høgni Hoydal
- Succeeded by: Uni Rasmussen
- In office 26 September 2008 – 19 January 2011
- Prime Minister: Kaj Leo Johannesen
- Preceded by: Høgni Hoydal
- Succeeded by: Jacob Vestergaard

Minister of Finance
- In office 16 September 2019 – 16 February 2022
- Prime Minister: Bárður á Steig Nielsen
- Preceded by: Kristina Háfoss
- Succeeded by: Uni Rasmussen
- In office 14 November 2011 – 15 September 2015
- Prime Minister: Kaj Leo Johannesen
- Preceded by: Aksel V. Johannesen
- Succeeded by: Kristina Háfoss

Minister of Foreign Affairs
- In office 26 September 2008 – 19 January 2011
- Prime Minister: Kaj Leo Johannesen
- Preceded by: Høgni Hoydal
- Succeeded by: Jacob Vestergaard

Minister of Fisheries
- In office 14 December 1998 – 4 January 2003
- Prime Minister: Anfinn Kallsberg
- Preceded by: John Petersen
- Succeeded by: Jacob Vestergaard

Leader of the People's Party
- In office 2 August 2007 – 18 March 2022
- Preceded by: Anfinn Kallsberg
- Succeeded by: Christian Andreasen

Personal details
- Born: 17 January 1969 (age 57) Sørvágur, Faroe Islands
- Party: Fólkaflokkurin

Jørgen Niclasen (born 17 January 1969 in Sørvágur) is a Faroese politician. He served as the leader of the People's Party (Fólkaflokkurin) from 2007 to 2022.

On 2 October 2008, he was officially appointed Kaj Leo Johannesen's Deputy Prime Minister, which he was until the 2011 Faroese parliamentary election. He was reelected and became the Minister of Finance in the Cabinet of Kaj Leo Johannesen II.

Niclasen again became minister of finance and deputy prime minister in Bárður á Steig Nielsen's cabinet following the 2019 Faroese general election. He resigned on 16 February 2022 after it was discovered that he had driven drunk six days prior. He subsequently also stepped down as party leader, with Christian Andreasen elected as his successor. Who was months later replaced by Beinir Jóhannesen.

In parliament elections in December 2022 he was re-elected with 393 votes.

He now chairs the Culture Committee and is member of the Committee of Industry.
