= Bárður á Lakjuni =

Faroese politician (born 1978)

Member of the Løgting
- Incumbent
- Assumed office 8 December 2022

Personal details
- Born: 10 October 1978 (age 47)
- Party: People's Party
- Parent: Jógvan á Lakjuni (father)
- Relatives: Victor Danielsen (great-grandfather)

Bárður á Lakjuni (born 10 October 1978) is a Faroese politician serving as a member of the Løgting since 2022. He is the son of Jógvan á Lakjuni.
