= Høgni Hoydal =

Faroese politician

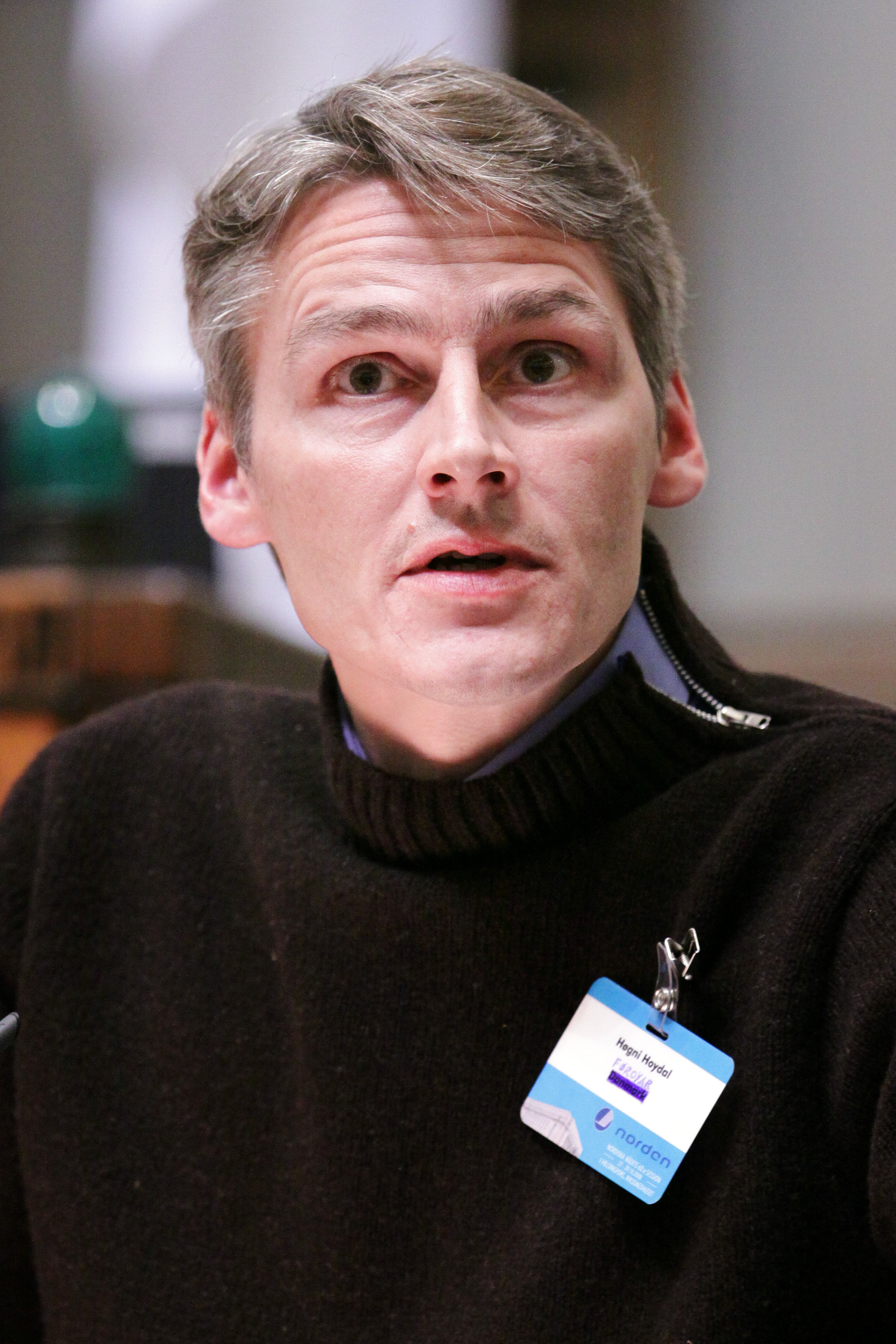

Deputy Prime Minister of the Faroe Islands
- In office 22 December 2022 – 13 April 2026
- Prime Minister: Aksel V. Johannesen
- Preceded by: Uni Rasmussen
- Succeeded by: Bárður á Steig Nielsen
- In office 15 September 2015 – 16 September 2019
- Prime Minister: Aksel V. Johannesen
- Preceded by: Annika Olsen
- Succeeded by: Jørgen Niclasen
- In office 5 February 2008 – 15 September 2008
- Prime Minister: Jóannes Eidesgaard
- Preceded by: Bjarni Djurholm
- Succeeded by: Jørgen Niclasen
- In office 15 May 1998 – 5 December 2003
- Prime Minister: Anfinn Kallsberg
- Preceded by: Jóannes Eidesgaard
- Succeeded by: Bjarni Djurholm

Minister of Foreign Affairs and Trade
- In office 22 December 2022 – 13 April 2026
- Prime Minister: Aksel V. Johannesen
- Preceded by: Jenis av Rana (Foreign Affairs) / Magnus Rasmussen (Trade)
- Succeeded by: Bárður á Steig Nielsen

Minister of Fisheries
- In office 15 September 2015 – 16 September 2019
- Prime Minister: Aksel V. Johannesen
- Preceded by: Jacob Vestergaard
- Succeeded by: Jacob Vestergaard

Leader of Tjóðveldi
- In office 2000–2024
- Preceded by: Heini O. Heinesen
- Succeeded by: Sirið Stenberg

Minister of Foreign Affairs
- In office 4 February 2008 – 15 September 2008
- Prime Minister: Jóannes Eidesgaard
- Preceded by: Jóannes Eidesgaard
- Succeeded by: Jørgen Niclasen

Minister of Selfgoverning and Justice
- In office 15 May 1998 – 5 December 2003
- Prime Minister: Anfinn Kallsberg
- Preceded by: Óli Jacobsen
- Succeeded by: Jógvan við Keldu

Member of Løgting
- Incumbent
- Assumed office 20 November 2001
- Constituency: Faroe Islands (2001-2011 & 2015-)

Personal details
- Born: Høgni Karsten Hoydal; 28 March 1966 (age 60) Copenhagen, Denmark
- Spouse: Hildur Hermansen
- Children: 3
- Parent(s): Gunvør and Kjartan Hoydal

Høgni Karsten Hoydal (born 28 March 1966), commonly called Høgni Hoydal, is a Faroese politician. He had served as the Deputy Prime Minister of the Faroe Islands under several prime ministers. He has been the party leader of Tjóðveldi since 1998.

== Before taking office ==
Høgni Hoydal was a reporter of the Faroese national television station, Kringvarp Føroya, for some years prior to his election to the Faroese parliament in 1998.

== Political career ==
Høgni Hoydal brought the Republican Party back up from four MPs to eight in the 1998 elections and into government, due to popular opinion at the time. Høgni Hoydal became Minister of Justice and deputy Prime Minister.

The coalition stayed in power after the parliamentary elections in 2002 and brought one more political party into the coalition and government. This coalition, however, broke down on 5 December 2003 and new elections held. After these elections another coalition was formed leaving the Republican Party in opposition.

In 2008, Hoydal assumed the position of Minister of Foreign Affairs. The government coalition between the Republican Party, the People's Party and the Independence Party agreed on a road map towards independence and initiated negotiations with the Government of Denmark. The negotiations, however, broke down and the Faroese coalition started going on a path towards greater autonomy by taking over the responsibility of matters previously undertaken by Denmark.

- Member of Republican Party
- 1998 member of the Faroese parliament (Løgting)
- 16 May 1998 to 5 September 2003 Minister of Justice and deputy Prime Minister
- 5 February to 15 September 2008 Minister of Foreign Affairs in the Second Cabinet of Jóannes Eidesgaard
- 2001 – 2011 Member of Danish parliament (Folketing) except for the periods when he was Minister
- 2015 – Minister of Fisheries

== Member of the Folketing ==
In 2001, he was elected as one of the two Faroese members of the Danish Folketing. He was re-elected in 2005 and re-elected again in 2007; but in the 2011 election lost the party's only Folketing seat to the Social Democrats' Sjúrður Skaale.

== Bibliography ==
- Håb i krise, written together with Michael Haldrup, 1995 (Danish)
- Frælsi er Ábyrgd, 2000 (Faroese)
- Myten om rigsfællesskabet, 2000 (Danish)

== The Hoydal family ==
The family name Hoydal takes name after a neighbourhood in Tórshavn named Hoydalar, it is in a valley near Hoyvík. Dánjal Hoydal was the first who took the name, he was Høgni Hoydal's great-grandfather, he was born Joensen. His son was the Faroese writer and politician Karsten Hoydal (1912–1990) who was born in Hoydalar. Karsten Hoydal and his wife Marie Louise Falk-Rønne have four children: Annika Hoydal, born 1945, is an actor and singer, Gunnar Hoydal, born 1941 is also a writer, Kjartan Hoydal, born 1941 (Gunnar and Kjartan are twins) was secretary of the North East Atlantic Fisheries Commission (NEAFC) and is now director of sp/f Skrivarastova Fish and Film. They have another son called Egil. Høgni Hoydal is Kjartan Hoydal's son.
