= 2022 Faroese general election =

Danish territorial election

- 8 December 2022
- All 33 members in the Løgting; 17 seats needed for a majority
- Turnout: 88.05% (▼1.65pp)
Party	Leader	Vote %	Seats	+/–
Social Democratic	Aksel V. Johannesen	26.58	9	+2
Union	Bárður á Steig Nielsen	19.98	7	0
People's	Beinir Johannesen	18.92	6	−2
Republic	Høgni Hoydal	17.71	6	0
Progress	Ruth Vang	7.52	3	+1
Centre	Jenis av Rana	6.55	2	0
This lists parties that won seats. See the complete results below.
Most voted-for party by polling area
Prime Minister before	Prime Minister
Bárður á Steig Nielsen; Union	Aksel V. Johannesen; Social Democratic

Early general elections were held in the Faroe Islands on 8 December 2022. The opposition Social Democratic Party led by former prime minister Aksel V. Johannesen emerged as the largest party, receiving the largest vote share of any party since 1990, while Self-Government lost its Løgting representation for the first time since 1945.

== Background ==
Following the 2019 general elections a coalition government was formed by Union Party leader Bárður á Steig Nielsen, consisting of the Union Party, the People's Party and the Centre Party, which together won 17 of the 33 seats.

During the campaign for the November 2022 Danish general election, Centre Party leader and Faroese Minister of Foreign Affairs Jenis av Rana stated that he could not support Søren Pape Poulsen, the leader of the Conservative People's Party, becoming Prime Minister of Denmark as Poulsen is gay.

The opposition parties in the Løgting planned to call a motion of no confidence on 8 November, but Faroese Prime Minister Bárður á Steig Nielsen sacked av Rana the same day. The Centre Party subsequently withdrew from the government, resulting in it losing its majority and Nielsen calling early elections.

== Electoral system ==
The 33 members of the Løgting were elected by open list proportional representation in a single nationwide constituency with an electoral threshold of 1/33 of votes (3.0̅3̅%). Seats were allocated using the largest remainder method.

== Opinion polls ==
A C B E H F D

			Parties									Government v. Opposition (Total) (Note: Excluding the percentages of any political party that does not meet the electoral threshold as stated on this page.)		
Polling firm	Fieldwork date	Sample size	A	С	B	E	H	F	D	Others	Lead	Government	Opposition	Lead
2022 election	8 December 2022	–	18.9; 6	26.6; 9	20.0; 7	17.7; 6	6.6; 2	7.5; 3	2.7; 0	0.0	6.6	45.5; 15	51.8; 18	6.3
Spyr.fo	5 December 2022	–	23.3; 8	26.8; 9	15.8; 5	17.9; 6	6.5; 2	7.0; 3	2.8; 0	0.0	3.5	45.6; 15	51.7; 18	6.1
Gallup	1–3 December 2022	536	19.8; 7	25.9; 9	18.3; 6	19.8; 7	6.2; 2	7.8; 2	2.2; 0	0.0	6.1	44.3; 15	53.6; 18	9.3
Spyr.fo	24 November 2022	–	19.2; 7	25.4; 9	18.9; 6	20.7; 7	6.8; 2	6.6; 2	2.5; 0	0.0	4.7	44.9; 15	52.7; 18	7.8
Spyr.fo	14 November 2022	–	12.6; 4	28.3; 10	18.0; 6	21.5; 7	8.2; 3	9.3; 3	2.1; 0	0.0	6.8	38.8; 13	59.1; 20	20.3
Spyr.fo	8 November 2022	–	16.4; 6	27.3; 9	20.7; 7	19.0; 6	8.0; 3	7.0; 2	1.6; 0	0.0	6.6	45.1; 16	53.3; 17	8.2
2022 Danish election	31 October 2022	–	15.5	28.2	30.2	18.1	4.5	3.5	0.0	0.0	2.0	50.2	49.8	0.4
Gallup	8–16 September 2022	543	20.9; 7	29.7; 10	18.1; 6	16.4; 5	6.1; 2	5.7; 2	3.1; 1	0.0	8.8	45.1; 15	54.9; 18	9.8
Spyr.fo	24 August 2022	–	16.1; 5	30.0; 10	18.0; 6	19.5; 7	6.5; 2	7.9; 3	2.1; 0	0.0	10.5	40.6; 13	57.4; 20	16.8
Spyr.fo	14 June 2022	–	19.5; 6	31.5; 11	15.0; 5	20.2; 7	6.8; 2	5.1; 2	1.3; 0	0.6	11.3	41.3; 13	56.8; 20	15.5
Spyr.fo	17 May 2022	–	17.9; 6	31.0; 10	14.2; 5	21.1; 7	5.2; 2	8.2; 3	2.4; 0	0.0	9.9	37.3; 13	60.3; 20	23.0
Gallup	10–16 May 2022	561	18.4; 6	28.5; 10	21.0; 7	19.0; 6	4.5; 2	6.0; 2	2.6; 0	0.0	7.5	43.9; 15	53.5; 18	9.6
Spyr.fo	16 March 2022	–	18.5; 6	30.1; 10	17.1; 6	17.5; 6	5.8; 2	8.9; 3	2.2; 0	0.0	11.6	41.4; 14	56.5; 19	15.1
Spyr.fo	6 January 2022	–	13.4; 4	32.1; 11	16.3; 5	20.1; 7	4.6; 2	9.9; 3	3.7; 1	0.0	12.0	34.3; 11	65.8; 22	31.5
Spyr.fo	21 December 2021	–	15.2; 5	31.0; 10	16.7; 6	20.0; 7	6.7; 2	6.4; 2	3.0; 1	1.0	11.0	38.6; 13	60.4; 20	21.8
Spyr.fo	1 December 2021	–	17.6; 6	32.5; 11	14.8; 5	18.8; 6	6.1; 2	7.3; 3	2.9; 0	0.0	13.7	38.5; 13	58.6; 20	20.1
Spyr.fo	24 August 2021	–	20.6; 7	28.0; 9	16.8; 5	19.8; 7	7.7; 3	5.3; 2	2.3; 0	0.0	7.4	45.1; 15	53.1; 18	8.0
Spyr.fo	29 June 2021	–	21.4; 7	29.0; 10	17.8; 6	17.9; 6	5.7; 2	5.1; 2	3.0; 0	0.1	7.6	44.9; 15	55.0; 18	10.1
Spyr.fo	30 March 2021	–	21.1; 8	29.0; 10	15.7; 5	19.1; 6	6.8; 2	6.0; 2	1.2; 0	1.1	7.9	43.6; 15	54.1; 18	10.5
Spyr.fo	26 November 2020	–	21.3; 7	28.2; 10	19.0; 6	18.6; 6	5.5; 2	5.5; 2	1.9; 0	0.1	6.9	45.8; 15	52.3; 18	6.5
Spyr.fo	31 August 2020	–	23.6; 8	28.5; 10	17.1; 6	16.4; 5	5.4; 2	5.3; 2	2.8; 0	0.9	4.9	46.1; 16	50.2; 17	4.1
Spyr.fo	29 May 2020	–	22.9; 8	27.1 9	19.4; 7	18.2; 6	4.3; 1	6.0; 2	2.1; 0	0.0	4.2	46.6; 16	51.3; 17	4.7
Spyr.fo	15 November 2019	–	24.0; 8	23.5; 8	20.8; 7	18.8; 6	4.9; 2	5.3; 2	2.7; 0	0.0	0.5	49.7; 17	47.6; 16	2.1
2019 election	31 August 2019	–	24.5; 8	22.1; 7	20.4; 7	18.1; 6	5.4; 2	4.6; 2	3.4; 1	1.5	2.4	50.3; 17	48.2; 16	2.1

== Results ==
Party	Votes	%	Seats	+/–
Social Democratic Party	9,094	26.58	9	+2
Union Party	6,834	19.98	7	0
People's Party	6,473	18.92	6	–2
Republic	6,057	17.71	6	0
Progress	2,571	7.52	3	+1
Centre Party	2,242	6.55	2	0
Self-Government	938	2.74	0	–1
Total	34,209	100.00	33	0
Valid votes	34,209	99.57		
Invalid votes	52	0.15		
Blank votes	95	0.28		
Total votes	34,356	100.00		
Registered voters/turnout	39,020	88.05		
Source: kvf.fo

== Aftermath ==
On 22 December 2022 Aksel V. Johannesen was elected prime minister of a coalition government between Social Democratic, Republic and Progress.

== See also ==
- 2022 Danish general election
