= Kaj Leo Johannesen =

Faroese politician (born 1964)

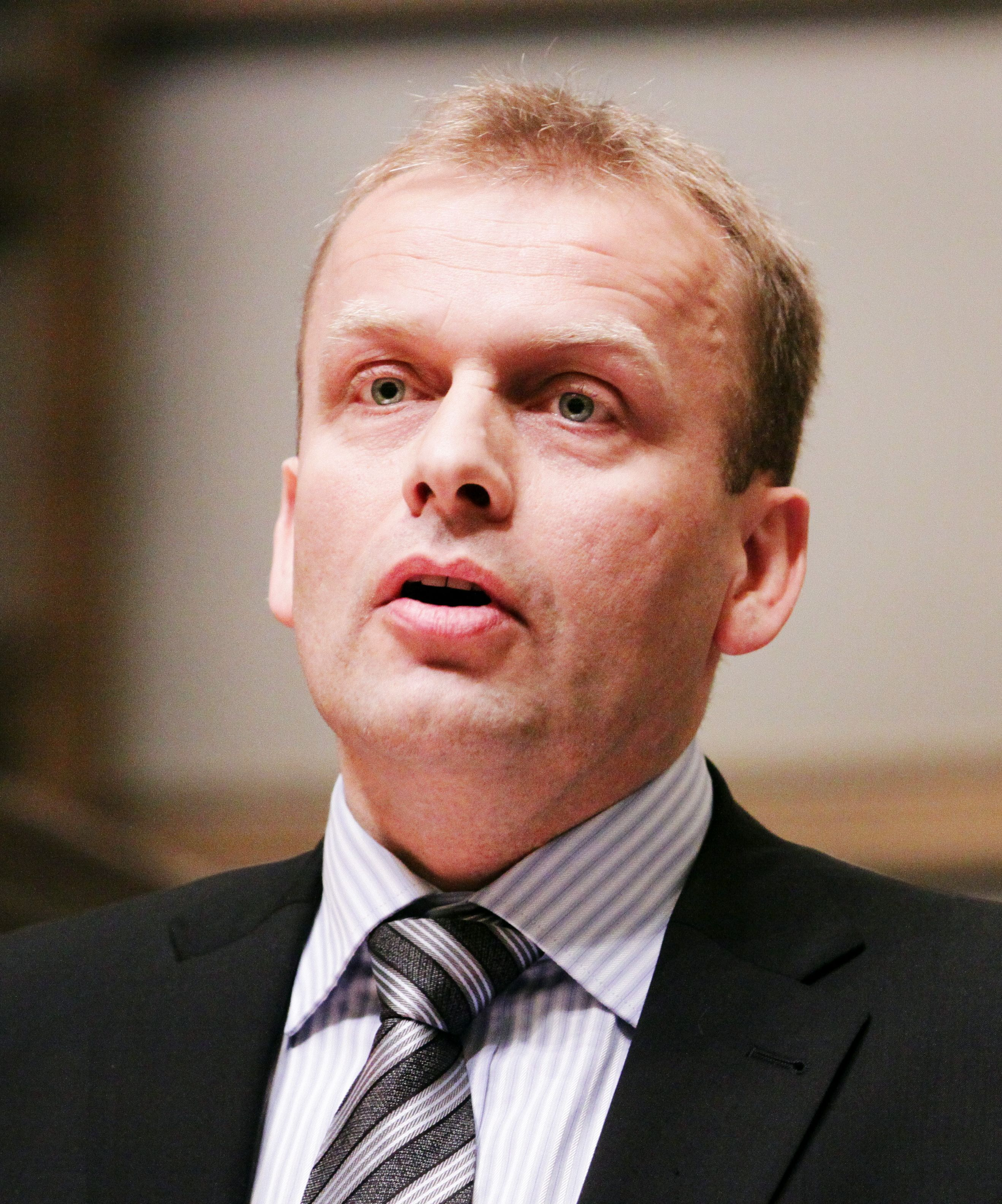
- Johannesen in 2008

Prime Minister of the Faroe Islands
- In office 26 September 2008 – 15 September 2015
- Monarch: Margrethe II
- Deputy: Jørgen Niclasen; Jacob Vestergaard; Aksel V. Johannesen; Annika Olsen
- Preceded by: Jóannes Eidesgaard
- Succeeded by: Aksel V. Johannesen

Personal details
- Born: 28 August 1964 (age 62) Tórshavn, Faroe Islands
- Party: Union Party
- Spouse: Jórun Bærendsen
Association football career
- Full name: Kaj Leo Holm Johannesen
- Height: 1.80 m (5 ft 11 in)
- Position: Goalkeeper
Senior career*
Years	Team	Apps	(Gls)
1984–2004	HB Tórshavn	299	(0)
Total		299	(0)
International career
1991–1992	Faroe Islands	4	(0)
- * Club domestic league appearances and goals

Kaj Leo Holm Johannesen (born 28 August 1964 in Tórshavn) is a Faroese politician. He was the prime minister of the Faroe Islands, representing the Faroese Unionist Party (Sambandsflokkurin). He took office, succeeding Jóannes Eidesgaard on 26 September 2008 and left office on 15 September 2015, after his party and coalition with Fólkaflokkurin and Miðflokkurin lost the general election on 1 September 2015. Johannesen is also a former international football player; he was goalkeeper for the Faroe Islands national football team.

In the Faroese parliamentary elections, held on 29 October 2011 Kaj Leo Johannesen received 1979 personal votes. This is the largest number of personal votes ever given to a Faroese parliament candidate. He held this record until the general election 2015, when Aksel V. Johannesen received 2405 personal votes. At the same election Kaj Leo Johannesen received 603 personal votes.

== Member of the city council of Tórshavn ==
Kaj Leo Johannesen was a member of the City Council of Tórshavn 1997–2000, representing the Faroese Unionist Party (Sambandsflokkurin).

== Football career ==
Kaj Leo Johannesen was a football goalkeeper and received 4 full international caps for the Faroes. He made his debut as a half-time substitute in a Euro 1992 qualifying game against eventual winners Denmark in Landskrona, Sweden, which served as Faroes' home ground during their very first international qualifying tournament. He played all 90 minutes in his other international matches, including the first ever competitive game, played on the Faroes, on 3 June 1992 at Svangaskarð, Toftir against Belgium in 1994 FIFA World Cup qualification.

He was unused substitute in 18 FIFA registered international matches in the period between 1989 and 1995. Kaj Leo was kept on the bench in most international matches by the "Bobble Hat" goalkeeper Jens Martin Knudsen, also in the Euro 1992 qualifying 1–0 victory over Austria in Landskrona, Sweden on 12 September 1990.

International appearances
#	Date	Venue	Opponent	Result	Competition	Goals against
1	25 September 1991	Idrottsplats, Landskrona	Denmark	0–4	Euro 1992 qualifying	2
2	13 May 1992	Ullevaal, Oslo	Norway	0–2	Friendly	2
3	3 June 1992	Svangaskarð, Toftir	Belgium	0–3	1994 FIFA World Cup qualification	3
4	16 June 1992	Svangaskarð, Toftir	Cyprus	0–2	1994 FIFA World Cup qualification	2

=== Club football career ===
Kaj Leo Johannesen played as first choice goalkeeper for one of the strongest Faroese clubs, HB Tórshavn between 1984 and 1998, and made some comebacks in later years. He became champion of the Faroese league in 1988, 1990 and 1998.

== Handball player for Kyndil ==
Kaj Leo Johannesen is also a former handball player. He played 163 matches for Kyndil and scored 625 goals for the club.

Political offices
Preceded by Jóannes Eidesgaard	Prime Minister of the Faroe Islands; 2008-2015	Succeeded by Aksel V. Johannesen
