= Bárður á Steig Nielsen =

Faroese politician and businessman (born 1972)

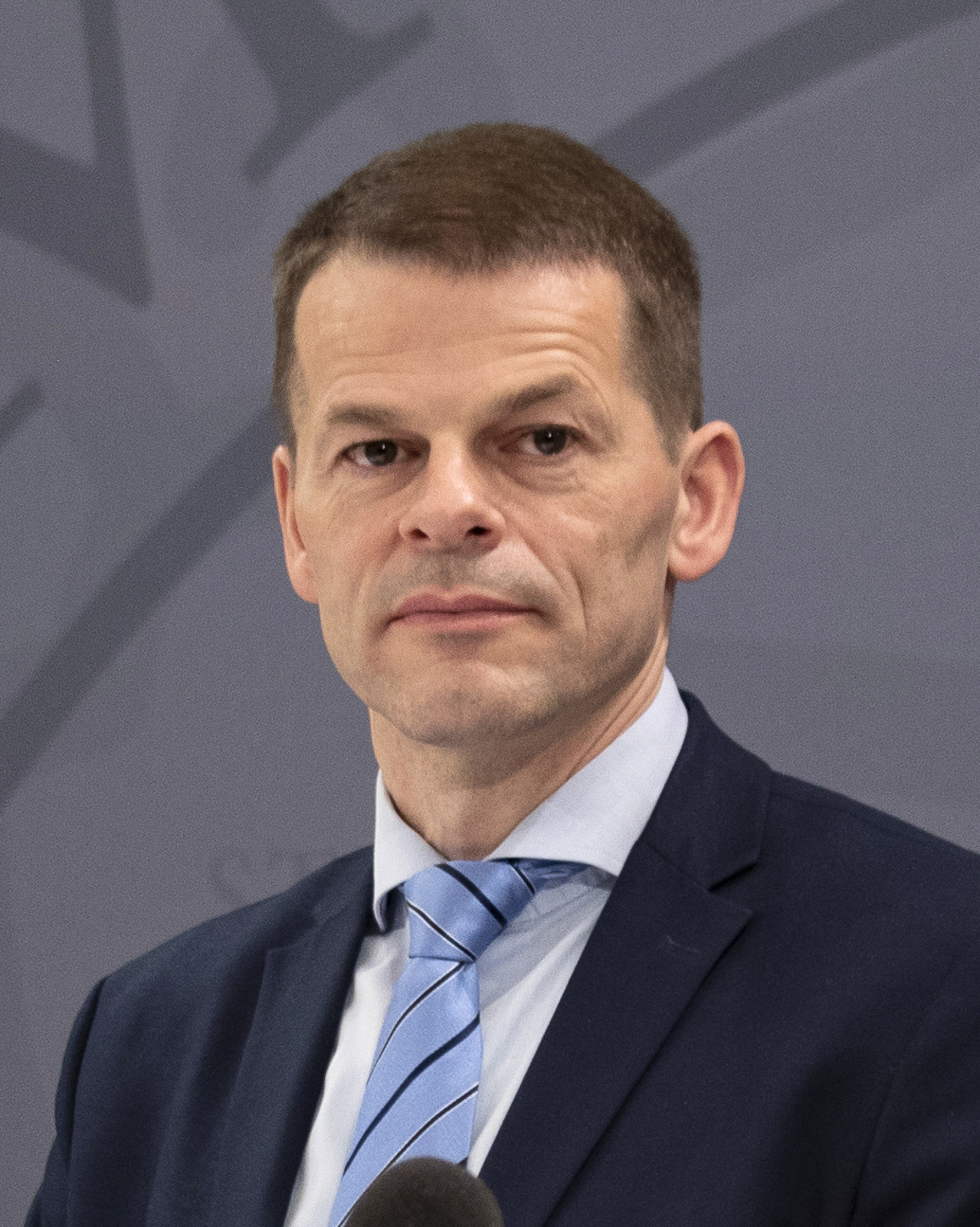
- Nielsen in 2021

Deputy Prime Minister of the Faroe Islands Minister of Foreign Affairs
- Incumbent
- Assumed office 13 April 2026
- Prime Minister: Beinir Johannesen
- Preceded by: Høgni Hoydal

Leader of the Union Party
- Incumbent
- Assumed office 24 October 2015
- Preceded by: Kaj Leo Johannesen

Prime Minister of the Faroe Islands
- In office 16 September 2019 – 22 December 2022
- Monarch: Margrethe II
- Deputy: Jørgen Niclasen; Uni Rasmussen
- Preceded by: Aksel V. Johannesen
- Succeeded by: Aksel V. Johannesen

Minister of Finance
- In office 3 February 2004 – 9 May 2007
- Prime Minister: Jóannes Eidesgaard
- Preceded by: Karsten Hansen
- Succeeded by: Magni Laksáfoss

Personal details
- Born: 16 April 1972 (age 54) Vestmanna, Faroe Islands
- Party: Union
- Spouse: Rakul Nielsen
- Children: 4

Bárður á Steig Nielsen (Faroese pronunciation: [ˌbɔ͡ɑɹʊɹ ɔ͡ɑ ˈsta͡ɪ ˈnɪlsɛn]; born 16 April 1972) is a Faroese politician and businessman who serves as leader of the Union Party since 2015 and was prime minister from 2019 to 2022. He is also goalkeeper of the VÍF Vestmanna handball team and a former handball player of the Faroe Islands national team.

== Education and business career ==
Bárður á Steig Nielsen has finished the first part of a Danish HD education in Management accounting from Aarhus University, School of Business and Social Sciences and has taken some of the subjects of the Merkonom education from Føroya Handilsskúli.

He started his business career as an employee in the accountancy firm Rasmussen og Weihe in Tórshavn 1993–2000. From 2001 to 2004 he was employed as the chief Accountant at the Kollafjord Pelagic in Kollafjørður. In 2007 he left his position as the Finance Minister of the Faroe Islands in order to become the general manager of the large scale building project SMI Stóratjørn in Hoyvík, planned by Icelandic business people. The project was never implemented because of the 2008 financial crisis; á Steig Nielsen was employed there until February 2009. In 2009–2010 he was the general manager of a machine shop in Hoyvík 2009–2010. From 2010 he was the CFO of the telephone company Vodafone Føroyar in Tórshavn.

He has been a board member of the Vágar Airport, Kollafjord Pelagic and of a few other trading companies in Tórshavn.

== Political career ==
Bárður á Steig Nielsen was elected to the Faroese parliament representing Norðurstreymoy in the periods of 2002–2004 and 2004–2008. He was the finance minister in the first cabinet of Jóannes Eidesgaard from 2004, but left the position in order to become the leader of the Stóra Tjørn building project, which was later cancelled because of the 2008 financial crisis. In the 2011 elections, he was re-elected for the Løgting. In March 2015, he was elected vice chairman of his party and on 24 October 2015, he was elected as the chairman of the Union Party. He was reelected to the Faroese parliament at the 2022 elections.
