= Progress (Faroe Islands) =

Faroese political party

Progress Framsókn
- Leader: Ruth Vang
- Founder: Poul Michelsen
- Founded: 9 March 2011
- Split from: People's Party
- Headquarters: Tórshavn, Faroe Islands
- Youth wing: Framsøkin Ung
- Ideology: Liberalism; Faroese independence
- Political position: Centre-right
- Nordic affiliation: Centre Group
- Colours: Orange
- Løgting: 2 / 33
- Folketing (Faroe seats): 0 / 2

Election symbol

Website
- www.framsokn.fo

Progress (Faroese: Framsókn) is a liberal, pro-Faroese independence political party on the Faroe Islands. It is led by Ruth Vang.

== History ==
Founded on 9 March 2011 by Poul Michelsen and others as a breakaway from the People's Party, the party won two seats in the October 2011 election to the 33-seat Løgting. Its two MPs in this first election were Poul Michelsen and Janus Rein. However, almost a year after the election, on 6 October 2012, Rein left the party and became an independent member of the Faroese Parliament. He didn't give any clear reason to why he left the party, just that there were some disagreements between him and Poul Michelsen. On the following day, the Faroese website aktuelt.fo, which was run by the newspaper Sosialurin at that time, brought an article saying that the two MPs disagreed on whether Rein should be a candidate for the elections for the city council of Tórshavn or not. The elections for the city councils of the Faroe Islands was to be held on 13 November 2012. Michelsen wanted Rein to be a candidate, but Rein refused and ultimately left the party. A few days later, 25 members of Framsókn wrote an open letter to Rein with an appeal for him to leave his seat in the parliament and give it to the next person on the list. The next person was Hanna Jensen, who took an active part in establishing the party from the beginning. Rein declined to do so. He later joined the People's Party.

In the Løgting election in 2015, Progress got 7.0% of the vote and two seats after polling much higher during the campaign. They subsequently formed a coalition government with Republic and the Social Democrats in which Poul Michelsen became Minister of Business and Foreign Affairs. On 17 September, Annika Olsen, a former Deputy Prime Minister, joined the party. She was previously a member of the People's Party until she left it nine days after the parliamentary election on 9 September 2015. However, after great personal pressure, she chose to leave Framsókn after only 3 days, on 20 September 2015, and took leave from the Løgting for a month.

== Current members of the Løgting ==
As of the 2026 general election:

Name	Elected (E), Re-elected (R), or Appointed (A)	Votes obtained in the general election	Title
Ruth Vang	R	991	Member of the Løgting
Bjarni K. Petersen	R	359	Member of the Løgting

== Election results ==
Faroese general election

Year	Votes		Seats		Position
Year	#	%	#	±	Position
2011	1,933	6.3	2 / 33	New	▲5th
2015	2,241	6.9	2 / 33	0	5th
2019	1,559	4.6	2 / 33	0	▼6th
2022	2,571	7.5	3 / 33	▲1	▲5th
2026	2,319	6.6	2 / 33	▼1	5th

Danish general election

Year	Votes		Members
Year	#	%	Members
2015	744	3.2	0 / 2
2019	638	2.5	0 / 2
2022	936	3.4	0 / 2
2026	Did not contest		
