= Aksel V. Johannesen =

Faroese lawyer and politician

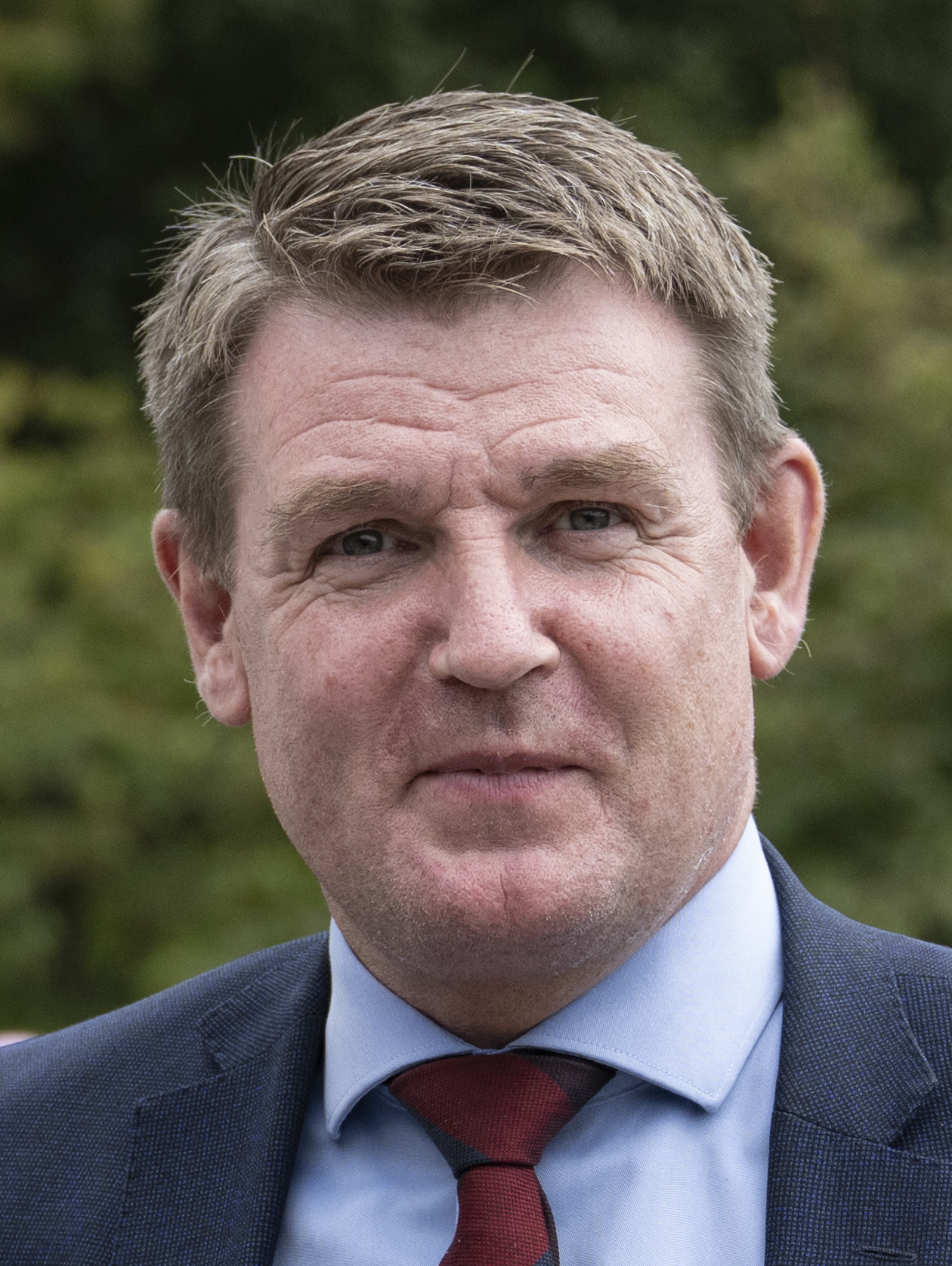
- Johannesen in 2025

Minister of Finance
- Incumbent
- Assumed office 13 April 2026
- Prime Minister: Beinir Johannesen
- Preceded by: Ruth Vang
- In office 21 February 2011 – 14 November 2011
- Prime Minister: Kaj Leo Johannesen
- Preceded by: Jóannes Eidesgaard
- Succeeded by: Jørgen Niclasen

Leader of the Social Democratic Party
- Incumbent
- Assumed office 5 March 2011
- Preceded by: Jóannes Eidesgaard

Prime Minister of the Faroe Islands
- In office 22 December 2022 – 13 April 2026
- Monarchs: Margrethe II; Frederik X
- Deputy: Høgni Hoydal
- Preceded by: Bárður á Steig Nielsen
- Succeeded by: Beinir Johannesen
- In office 15 September 2015 – 16 September 2019
- Monarch: Margrethe II
- Deputy: Høgni Hoydal
- Preceded by: Kaj Leo Johannesen
- Succeeded by: Bárður á Steig Nielsen

Deputy Prime Minister of the Faroe Islands
- In office 6 April 2011 – 14 November 2011
- Prime Minister: Kaj Leo Johannesen
- Preceded by: Jacob Vestergaard
- Succeeded by: Annika Olsen

Minister of Health
- In office 16 July 2009 – 21 February 2011
- Prime Minister: Kaj Leo Johannesen
- Preceded by: Hans Pauli Strøm
- Succeeded by: John Johannessen

Member of the Løgting
- Incumbent
- Assumed office 29 October 2011

Personal details
- Born: Aksel Vilhelmsson Johannesen; 8 November 1972 (age 53) Klaksvík, Faroe Islands
- Party: Social Democratic
- Spouse: Katrin Apol
- Children: 3
- Parent(s): Johild and Vilhelm Johannesen
- Relatives: Beinir Johannesen (nephew)
- Education: University of Copenhagen (LLM)
Association football career
- Height: 1.88 m (6 ft 2 in)
- Position: Forward
Senior career*
Years	Team	Apps	(Gls)
1989–1995	KÍ Klaksvík	38	(3)
Total		38	(3)
- * Club domestic league appearances and goals

Aksel Vilhelmsson Johannesen (born 8 November 1972) is a Faroese lawyer and politician who had served as the Prime Minister of the Faroe Islands from 2022 to 2026 and from 2015 to 2019, currently serving as the Minister of Finance. He has been a member of the Løgting since 2011, as a member of the Social Democratic Party. Prior to his tenure as prime minister he was Minister of Health Affairs and Minister of Finance.

== Early life and education ==
Aksel Vilhelmson Johannesen was born in Klaksvík, on 8 November 1972, to Johild and Vilhelm Johannesen. His father was a member of the National Council and Folketing. He graduated from the University of Copenhagen with a Master of Laws in 2004, and practice law in Tórshavn.

Johannesen is also a noted runner, and was the national 100 meter champion in 1994. He also played volleyball for Mjølnir, the club of Klaksvík.

== Career ==
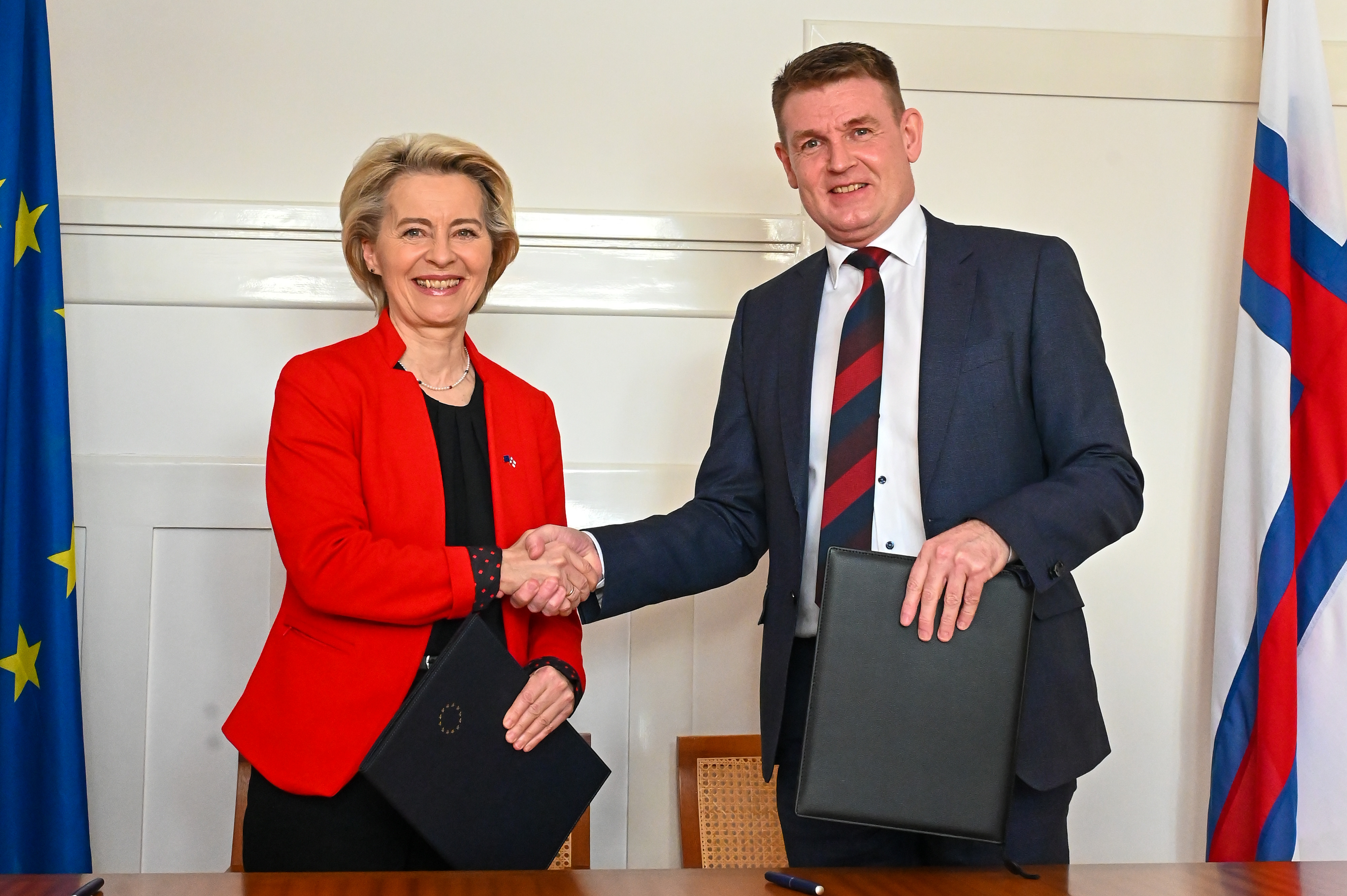
Johannesen with Ursula von der Leyen in 2024

In the 2011 election Johannesen won a seat in the Løgting. During his tenure in the Løgting he was a member of the Finance, Working, Welfare, and Foreign Affairs committees.On 5 March 2011, he defeated Heðin Mortensen to become leader of the Social Democratic Party by a vote of 102 to 41. He was a temporary member of the Folketing from 20 April to 20 May 2012. He was Minister of Health Affairs from 2009 to 2011, and Minister of Finance in 2011.

From 15 September 2015 to 14 September 2019, Johannesen served as Prime Minister until his coalition lost their majority in the 2019 election. He regained the position on 22 December 2022. His government survived a motion of no confidence in 2017, by a vote of 15 to 17 against.

== Personal life ==
Johannesen married Katrin Apol, with whom he had three children.

== Works cited ==
=== News ===
- Jacobsen, Vilmund (19 May 2017). "Løgmaður reið stormin av sær". info. Archived from the original on 30 June 2025.

=== Web ===
- "Aksel V. Johannesen". Social Democratic Party. Archived from the original on 30 June 2025.
- "Aksel V. Johannesen". Løgting. Archived from the original on 20 October 2015.
- "Aksel V. Johannesen (JF)". Folketing. Archived from the original on 30 June 2025.
- "Former Prime Ministers of the Faroe Islands". Faroe Islands. Archived from the original on 30 June 2025.
- "History". Social Democratic Party. Archived from the original on 2 February 2014.
- "Indberetning". Ombudsman of the Faroe Islands. 2011. Archived from the original on 30 June 2025.
- "New Government takes office". Faroe Islands. 15 September 2015. Archived from the original on 30 June 2025.
- "The Prime Minister of the Faroe Islands". Faroe Islands. Archived from the original on 30 June 2025.
