= People's Party (Faroe Islands) =

The Faroese People's Party – Radical Self-Government Hin føroyski fólkaflokkurin – radikalt sjálvstýri
- Leader: Beinir Johannesen
- Founded: 1939
- Merger of: Business Party with a faction of the Self-Government Party
- Headquarters: Jónas Broncksgøta 29; 100 Tórshavn
- Youth wing: HUXA
- Ideology: Conservatism; Social conservatism; Economic liberalism; Faroese independence
- Political position: Centre-right to right-wing
- National affiliation: Conservative People's Party
- European affiliation: European Conservatives and Reformists Party (until 2022)
- International affiliation: International Democrat Union
- Nordic affiliation: Conservative Group
- Colours: Green
- Løgting: 9 / 33
- Folketing (Faroe seats): 0 / 2

Election symbol

Website
- www.folkaflokkurin.fo

The Faroese People's Party – Radical Self-Government (Faroese: Hin føroyski fólkaflokkurin – radikalt sjálvstýri) is a pro-Faroese independence conservative and conservative-liberal political party on the Faroe Islands led by Beinir Johannesen. Founded in 1939 by defectors from the Self-Government Party and former members of the Business Party (Vinnuflokkurin), the party has traditionally supported greater autonomy for the Faroe Islands. Party leader Hákun Djurhuus served as prime minister from 1963 to 1967, as did Jógvan Sundstein from 1989 to 1991. In 1998, it adopted a policy that supports full independence from Denmark as part of a coalition deal in which leader Anfinn Kallsberg became PM. Throughout the decades, it has formed coalition governments with all Faroese political parties except for Framsókn, with its latest term in government lasting until 2022.

The party was a member of the European Conservatives and Reformists Party until 2022. The party is affiliated to the International Democrat Union.

== History ==
Former party logo

The party was founded in 1939 as Vinnuflokkurin. The party split from the Self-Government Party over land reform, and maintained a policy of economic liberalisation and social conservatism, with the party's support based in the fishing industry and private business. The party's economic programme was one of exploitation of local resources to reduce dependence on Denmark, and success of the Sjóvinnubankin was utilised by the party to demonstrate that the Faroes could be economically self-sustaining. The party was given its current name in 1940. In the 1943 Faroese election, the party won 12 out of 25 seats: one short of an overall majority.

The People's Party entered a coalition government with the Social Democratic Party in 1990, breaking the cycle of centre-right and centre-left coalitions. The party withdrew in 1993, being replaced by left-wing parties. In the 1994 Faroese election, the party lost over a quarter of its vote, remaining outside government. However, it did return in 1996, this time with the Union Party, the Self-Government Party, and the Labour Front.

In the election in 1998, the party bounced back to its pre-1994 position, and entered into a cross-spectrum coalition with the Republican Party and the Self-Government Party, under which the People's Party adopted a policy of seeking independence. The independence plan failed in 2001, after Denmark threatened to cut economic assistance earlier than anticipated. In the following year's election, the party remained on 21% of the vote, and stayed in a renewed coalition that also included the Centre Party.

When chairman Anfinn Kallsberg decided not to run for re-election, a new election was slated. There were two candidates, former minister of Fishery, Jørgen Niclasen, and current minister of Industry, Bjarni Djurholm. The election on 2 August 2007 gave Jørgen Niclasen the majority of the votes, making him the new party chairman. In the Danish parliamentary elections of 2007 the party received 20.5% of the Faroese vote (down from the 24.1% it had won in 2005) and lost the seat it had previously held in the Danish national Folketing. At the 2008 Faroese election, the party won 20.1% of the popular vote and seven out of 33 seats.

In early elections in 2011, the party won eight seats. In 2013, Janus Rein, who was elected for Progress, joined the Peoples Party after being a member of the Løgting without any political membership for eleven months. After this event, the Peoples Party has nine of the 33 members of the Løgting.

At the general election 2015, the party lost two seats, they got 18.9% of the votes and six members. Eight days after the election, Annika Olsen who had received 961 personal votes, left the People's Party, which means that the party lost one member and now has five parliament members. On 4 February 2016 she became a member of the People's Party again.

== Ideology ==
Generally, the party is liberal conservative. In economics, the party is supportive of the economic liberalism.

The party supports Faroese independence from Denmark. It is one of two major parties (along with Republic) whose primary concern was historically the constitutional issue, rather than economics.

== Election results ==
Year	Votes		Seats		Position
Year	#	%	#	±	Position
1940	2,084	24.7%	6 / 24	New	▲2nd
1943	4,010	41.5%	12 / 25	▲6	▲1st
1945	5,708	43.4%	11 / 23	▼1	1st
1946	5,396	41.0%	8 / 20	▼3	1st
1950	3,750	32.3%	8 / 25	0	1st
1954	2,660	20.9%	6 / 27	▼2	▼3rd
1958	2,467	17.8%	5 / 30	▼1	▼4th
1962	3,068	20.2%	6 / 29	▲1	4th
1966	3,811	21.6%	6 / 26	0	▲3rd
1970	3,617	20.0%	5 / 26	▼1	▼4th
1974	4,069	20.5%	5 / 26	0	▲3rd
1978	4,067	17.9%	6 / 32	▲1	▼4th
1980	4,399	18.9%	6 / 32	0	4th
1984	5,446	21.6%	7 / 32	▲1	▲2nd
1988	6,692	23.2%	8 / 32	▲1	▲1st
1990	6,234	21.9%	7 / 32	▼1	▼2nd
1994	4,093	16.0%	6 / 32	▼1	2nd
1998	5,886	21.3%	8 / 32	▲2	▼3rd
2002	6,352	20.8%	7 / 32	▼1	▼4th
2004	6,530	20.6%	7 / 32	0	4th
2008	6,240	20.1%	7 / 33	0	▲3rd
2011	6,883	22.5%	8 / 33	▲1	▲2nd
2015	6,102	18.9%	6 / 33	▼2	▼3rd
2019	8,290	24.5%	8 / 33	▲2	▲1st
2022	6,473	18.9%	6 / 33	▼2	▼3rd
2026	9,451	26.75%	9 / 33	▲3	▲1st

== Leaders ==
=== Chairmen ===
Leader		From	To
1st	Jóannes Patursson	1940	1946
2nd	Thorstein Petersen	1946	1951
3rd	Hákun Djurhuus	1951	1980
4th	Jógvan Sundstein	1980	1993
5th	Anfinn Kallsberg	1993	2007
6th	Jørgen Niclasen	2007	March 2022
7th	Christian Andreasen	March 2022	Nov. 2022
8th	Beinir Johannesen	Nov. 2022	present

== Current members of the Løgting ==
Following the 2026 general election:

Name	Elected (E), Re-elected (R), or Appointed (A)	Votes obtained in the general election	Title
Beinir Johannesen	R	1,679	Member of the Løgting; Parliamentary Leader of the People's Party
Bárður á Lakjuni	R	837	Member of the Løgting
Jørgen Niclasen	R	661	Member of the Løgting
Elsebeth Mercedis Gunnleygsdóttir	R	599	First Deputy Speaker of the Løgting
Jacob Vestergaard	R	553	Member of the Løgting
Fróði Magnussen	R	498	Member of the Løgting
Bill Justinussen	R	447	Member of the Løgting
Árni Skaale	R	405	Member of the Løgting
Grímur Sundstein	R	353	Member of the Løgting
