= Social Democratic Party (Faroe Islands) =

Social Democratic Party Javnaðarflokkurin
- Abbreviation: JF
- Chairperson: Aksel V. Johannesen
- Deputy Chairperson: Eyðgunn Samuelsen
- Founded: 25 September 1925; 100 years ago
- Headquarters: Tórshavn, Faroe Islands
- Youth wing: Socialist Youth
- Ideology: Social democracy Danish unionism
- Political position: Centre-left
- National affiliation: Social Democrats
- Nordic affiliation: SAMAK; The Social Democratic Group
- Colours: Red
- Løgting: 6 / 33
- Folketing (Faroe seats): 1 / 2

Election symbol
- C

Website
- j.fo

The Social Democratic Party (Faroese: Javnaðarflokkurin, lit. 'Equality Party', JF, Danish: Det socialdemokratiske parti, JF) is a social democratic unionist political party on the Faroe Islands, led by Aksel V. Johannesen.

== History ==
The Social Democratic Party was founded on 25 September 1925 by members of Faroese trade unions.

Its youth organization Sosialistiskt Ungmannafelag (Socialist Youth) was founded in 1965.

At the 2004 general election on 20 January 2004, the party received 21.8% of the popular vote and therefore won 7 out of 33 seats in the Løgting.

At the 2008 general election on 19 January 2008, the party received 19.3% of the popular vote and therefore won 6 out of 33 seats.

In the 2011 election for the Danish Folketing, the party improved its vote share to 21.0%, and took one of the two Faroese seats previously held by Republic. The elected representative of the Social Democratic Party in the Folketing is Sjúrður Skaale, who received 1539 personal votes.

At the 2011 general election on 29 October 2011, the party received 17.8% of the popular vote and therefore won 6 out of 33 seats.

At the 2015 general election on 1 September 2015, the party received 25.1% of the vote, winning a plurality of 8 seats in the Løgting.

== Ideology ==
The party is officially neutral on the matter of independence from Denmark, but generally leans towards remaining in the union. In the Danish Folketing, the Social Democratic Party supports the "Red Bloc" led by the Social Democrats of Denmark.

== Party leaders ==
- Aksel V. Johannesen 2011–present
- Jóannes Eidesgaard 1996–2011
- Marita Petersen 1993–1996
- Atli Dam 1972–1993
- Jákup Frederik Øregaard 1969–1972
- Einar Waag 1968–1969
- Peter Mohr Dam 1936–1968
- Maurentius Viðstein 1926–1936

== Current members of the Løgting ==
As of the 2022 general snap election:

Name	Elected (E), Re-elected (R), or Appointed (A)	Votes obtained in the general election	Title
Aksel V. Johannesen	R	1,961	Prime Minister
Ingilín Didriksen Strøm	R	787	Minister of Environment
Djóni Nolsøe Joensen	R	495	Minister of Children and Education
Bjarni Hammer	R	445	Member of the Logting
Jóhannis Joensen	R	416	First Vice-Chairman ("Deputy Speaker") of the Logting
Eyðgunn Samuelsen	E	405	Member of the Logting
Uni Holm Johannesen	E	344	Member of the Logting
Henrik Old	R	308	Member of the Logting
Margit Stórá	E	305	Minister of Health
Súsanna Bertholdsen	A	275	Substitute Member of the Logting
Kristianna Winther Poulsen	A	205	Substitute Member of the Logting
Hans Jacob Thomsen	A	189	Substitute Member of the Logting
Kim Durhuus	A	161	Substitute Member of the Logting

== Election results ==
Year	Votes		Seats		Position
Year	#	%	#	±	Position
1928	671	10.6	2 / 23	New	▲3rd
1932	825	10.5	2 / 21	0	3rd
1936	1,891	24.0	6 / 24	▲4	3rd
1940	2,012	23.9	6 / 24	0	3rd
1943	1,919	19.9	5 / 25	▼1	3rd
1945	3,305	22.8	6 / 23	▲1	3rd
1946^{a.}	3,705	28.1	4 / 20	▼2	3rd
1950	2,605	22.4	6 / 25	▲2	3rd
1954	2,518	19.8	5 / 27	▼1	▼4th
1958	3,589	25.8	8 / 30	▲3	▲1st
1962	4,161	27.5	8 / 29	0	1st
1966	4,751	27.0	7 / 26	▼1	1st
1970	4,916	27.2	7 / 26	0	1st
1974	5,125	25.8	7 / 26	0	1st
1978	5,062	22.3	8 / 32	0	▼2nd
1980	5,043	21.7	7 / 32	▼1	2nd
1984	5,879	23.4	8 / 32	▲1	▲1st
1988	6,233	21.6	7 / 32	▼1	▼2nd
1990	7,805	27.5	10 / 32	▲3	▲1st
1994	3,918	15.4	5 / 32	▼5	▼3rd
1998	6,063	21.9	7 / 32	▲2	▲2nd
2002	6,378	20.9	7 / 32	0	▼3rd
2004	6,921	21.8	7 / 32	0	▲2nd
2008	6,018	19.3	6 / 33	▼1	▼4th
2011	5,428	17.8	6 / 33	0	4th
2015	8,093	25.1	8 / 33	▲2	▲1st
2019	7,480	22.1	7 / 33	▼1	▼2nd
2022	9,094	26.6	9 / 33	▲2	▲1st
2026	6,672	18.88	6 / 33	▼3	▼3rd

a. The Social Democratic Party ran on a joint electoral coalition with the Self-Government Party in the 1946 general election (the former ended up winning 4 seats with the latter winning 2 seats).
