= Cabinet of the Faroe Islands =

Chief executive body and the government of the Faroe Islands

The Cabinet of the Faroe Islands (Faroese: Føroya Landsstýri) has been the chief executive body and the government of the Faroe Islands since the islands became self-governing in 1948. The cabinet is led by the prime minister (løgmaður). There are around seven members of the Cabinet, known as "ministers" (landsstýrismaður or landsstýriskvinna), all of whom are also heads of specific government ministries. The ministers are appointed by the prime minister. The Faroese government currently consists of seven ministers including the prime minister.

== List of cabinets of the Faroe Islands since 1948 ==
Cabinet	Period	Mandate	Political Parties
Cabinet of Andrass Samuelsen	1948–1950	1946	UP, SDP, SGP
Cabinet of Kristian Djurhuus I	1950–1954	1950	UP, PP
Cabinet of Kristian Djurhuus II	1954–1959	1954	UP, PP SGP
Cabinet of Peter Mohr Dam I	1959–1963	1958	SDP, UP, SGP
Cabinet of Hákun Djurhuus	1963–1967	1962	PP, R, SGP, CPP
Cabinet of Peter Mohr Dam II	1967–1968	1966	SDP, UP, SGP
Cabinet of Kristian Djurhuus III	1968–1970	-	UP, SDP, SGP
Cabinet of Atli Dam I	1970–1975	1970	SDP, UP, SGP
Cabinet of Atli Dam II	1975–1979	1974	SDP, R, PP
Cabinet of Atli Dam III	1979–1981	1978	SDP, R, PP
Cabinet of Pauli Ellefsen	1981–1985	1980	UP, PP, SGP
Cabinet of Atli Dam IV	1985–1988	1984	SDP, R, SGP, CPP
Cabinet of Atli Dam V	1988–1989	-	SDP, R, SGP, CPP
Cabinet of Jógvan Sundstein I	1989	1988	PP, R, SGP, CPP
Cabinet of Jógvan Sundstein II	1989–1991	-	PP, UP, R
Cabinet of Atli Dam VI	1991–1993	1990	SDP, PP
Cabinet of Marita Petersen	1993–1994	-	SDP, R, SGP
Cabinet of Edmund Joensen I	1994–1996	1994	UP, SDP, WU, SGP
Cabinet of Edmund Joensen II	1996–1998	-	UP, PP, WU, SGP
Cabinet of Anfinn Kallsberg I	1998–2002	1998	PP, R, SGP
Cabinet of Anfinn Kallsberg II	2002–2004	2002	PP, R, SGP, CP
Cabinet of Jóannes Eidesgaard I	2004–2008	2004	SDP, UP, PP
Cabinet of Jóannes Eidesgaard II	2008	2008	SDP, R, CP
Cabinet of Kaj Leo Johannesen I	2008–2011	-	UP, PP, SDP
Cabinet of Kaj Leo Johannesen II	2011–2015	2011	UP, PP, CP, SGP
Cabinet of Aksel V. Johannesen I	2015–2019	2015	SDP, R, PrP
Cabinet of Bárður á Steig Nielsen	2019–2022	2019	UP, PP, CP
Cabinet of Aksel V. Johannesen II	2022–2026	2022	SDP, R, PrP
Cabinet of Beinir Johannesen	2026–present	2026	PP, UP, SDP

== See also ==
- Løgting
- Politics of the Faroe Islands
