= Gladsaxe (nomination district) =

- Gladsaxe
- Nomination district constituency for the Folketing
- Location of Gladsaxe within Greater Copenhagen

- Location of Greater Copenhagen within Denmark
- Municipalities: Gladsaxe
- Constituency: Greater Copenhagen
- Electorate: 45,846 (2022)

Current constituency
- Created: 1950

Gladsaxe nominating district is one of the 92 nominating districts that exists for Danish elections following the 2007 municipal reform. It consists of Gladsaxe Municipality. It was created in 1950, though its boundaries have been changed since then.

In general elections, the district is a very strong area for parties commonly associated with the red bloc.

== General elections results ==
=== General elections in the 2020s ===
2022 Danish general election

Parties	Vote		
Parties	Votes	%	+ / -
Social Democrats	10,387	27.65	+2.02
Green Left	4,372	11.64	-0.14
Moderates	4,079	10.86	New
Venstre	3,570	9.50	-6.58
Liberal Alliance	2,745	7.31	+4.83
Red–Green Alliance	2,587	6.89	-1.91
Social Liberals	2,418	6.44	-6.07
Conservatives	1,805	4.80	-1.73
The Alternative	1,466	3.90	+0.46
Danish People's Party	1,205	3.21	-3.95
Denmark Democrats	1,171	3.12	New
New Right	914	2.43	+0.54
Independent Greens	668	1.78	New
Christian Democrats	130	0.35	-0.56
Jovan Tasevski	42	0.11	New
Henrik Vendelbo Petersen	7	0.02	New
Total	37,566		

=== General elections in the 2010s ===
2019 Danish general election

Parties	Vote		
Parties	Votes	%	+ / -
Social Democrats	9,977	25.63	-4.14
Venstre	6,260	16.08	+2.43
Social Liberals	4,869	12.51	+5.77
Green Left	4,584	11.78	+6.33
Red–Green Alliance	3,424	8.80	-1.17
Danish People's Party	2,787	7.16	-10.29
Conservatives	2,543	6.53	+3.39
The Alternative	1,339	3.44	-2.16
Liberal Alliance	965	2.48	-5.19
New Right	737	1.89	New
Stram Kurs	653	1.68	New
Christian Democrats	354	0.91	+0.43
Klaus Riskær Pedersen Party	336	0.86	New
Mads Palsvig	89	0.23	New
Christian B. Olesen	4	0.01	New
Total	38,921		

2015 Danish general election

Parties	Vote		
Parties	Votes	%	+ / -
Social Democrats	11,629	29.77	+3.82
Danish People's Party	6,817	17.45	+5.87
Venstre	5,333	13.65	-6.61
Red–Green Alliance	3,895	9.97	+0.76
Liberal Alliance	2,997	7.67	+2.92
Social Liberals	2,632	6.74	-5.93
The Alternative	2,187	5.60	New
Green Left	2,127	5.45	-4.24
Conservatives	1,225	3.14	-2.29
Christian Democrats	186	0.48	+0.11
Asif Ahmad	32	0.08	New
Christian Olesen	3	0.01	New
Total	39,063		

2011 Danish general election

Parties	Vote		
Parties	Votes	%	+ / -
Social Democrats	10,329	25.95	-1.76
Venstre	8,064	20.26	+1.85
Social Liberals	5,043	12.67	+5.93
Danish People's Party	4,609	11.58	-1.76
Green Left	3,855	9.69	-5.93
Red–Green Alliance	3,667	9.21	+5.84
Conservatives	2,162	5.43	-5.22
Liberal Alliance	1,890	4.75	+1.10
Christian Democrats	148	0.37	-0.13
Christian H. Hansen	30	0.08	New
Total	39,797		

=== General elections in the 2000s ===
2007 Danish general election

Parties	Vote		
Parties	Votes	%	+ / -
Social Democrats	10,780	27.71	+1.18
Venstre	7,164	18.41	-2.78
Green Left	6,077	15.62	+7.64
Danish People's Party	5,192	13.34	-0.62
Conservatives	4,144	10.65	+0.15
Social Liberals	2,622	6.74	-4.67
New Alliance	1,420	3.65	New
Red–Green Alliance	1,312	3.37	-1.74
Christian Democrats	196	0.50	-0.56
Feride Istogu Gillesberg	1	0.00	New
Janus Kramer Møller	1	0.00	New
Total	38,909		

2005 Danish general election

Parties	Vote		
Parties	Votes	%	+ / -
Social Democrats	10,079	26.53	-3.80
Venstre	8,051	21.19	-3.27
Danish People's Party	5,304	13.96	+0.62
Social Liberals	4,335	11.41	+5.19
Conservatives	3,989	10.50	+2.75
Green Left	3,032	7.98	-0.91
Red–Green Alliance	1,941	5.11	+1.23
Centre Democrats	726	1.91	-1.20
Christian Democrats	402	1.06	-0.64
Minority Party	134	0.35	New
Nahid Yazdanyar	3	0.01	New
Total	37,996		

2001 Danish general election

Parties	Vote		
Parties	Votes	%	+ / -
Social Democrats	12,023	30.33	-6.84
Venstre	9,698	24.46	+8.82
Danish People's Party	5,289	13.34	+3.73
Green Left	3,523	8.89	-0.98
Conservatives	3,071	7.75	-0.43
Social Liberals	2,464	6.22	+2.09
Red–Green Alliance	1,539	3.88	-0.58
Centre Democrats	1,234	3.11	-4.52
Christian People's Party	674	1.70	+0.18
Progress Party	130	0.33	-0.90
Total	39,645		

=== General elections in the 1990s ===
1998 Danish general election

Parties	Vote		
Parties	Votes	%	+ / -
Social Democrats	14,747	37.17	+2.99
Venstre	6,206	15.64	+0.95
Green Left	3,914	9.87	-0.03
Danish People's Party	3,814	9.61	New
Conservatives	3,247	8.18	-8.36
Centre Democrats	3,028	7.63	+1.28
Red–Green Alliance	1,769	4.46	-0.13
Social Liberals	1,639	4.13	-1.02
Christian People's Party	603	1.52	+0.33
Progress Party	487	1.23	-4.39
Mogens Glistrup	107	0.27	-0.28
Democratic Renewal	105	0.26	New
Poul Bregninge	8	0.02	New
Anders Kofoed	1	0.00	New
Total	39,675		

1994 Danish general election

Parties	Vote		
Parties	Votes	%	+ / -
Social Democrats	13,503	34.18	-4.47
Conservatives	6,533	16.54	+0.15
Venstre	5,803	14.69	+6.74
Green Left	3,912	9.90	-0.65
Centre Democrats	2,508	6.35	-4.39
Progress Party	2,222	5.62	+2.12
Social Liberals	2,034	5.15	+1.05
Red–Green Alliance	1,814	4.59	+1.95
Christian People's Party	472	1.19	-0.03
Niels I. Meyer	353	0.89	New
Mogens Glistrup	219	0.55	New
Preben Møller Hansen	131	0.33	New
Torben Faber	4	0.01	New
John Ziegler	2	0.01	New
Total	39,510		

1990 Danish general election

Parties	Vote		
Parties	Votes	%	+ / -
Social Democrats	15,065	38.65	+8.96
Conservatives	6,387	16.39	-2.24
Centre Democrats	4,187	10.74	+1.00
Green Left	4,111	10.55	-7.08
Venstre	3,098	7.95	+3.83
Social Liberals	1,599	4.10	-2.80
Progress Party	1,366	3.50	-3.07
Red–Green Alliance	1,029	2.64	New
Common Course	1,023	2.62	+0.47
Christian People's Party	474	1.22	+0.10
The Greens	350	0.90	-1.02
Justice Party of Denmark	267	0.69	New
Humanist Party	21	0.05	New
Total	38,977		

=== General elections in the 1980s ===
1988 Danish general election

Parties	Vote		
Parties	Votes	%	+ / -
Social Democrats	12,188	29.69	+2.12
Conservatives	7,648	18.63	-0.14
Green Left	7,239	17.63	-2.39
Centre Democrats	3,997	9.74	-0.24
Social Liberals	2,833	6.90	-0.68
Progress Party	2,697	6.57	+2.77
Venstre	1,690	4.12	+1.72
Common Course	882	2.15	-0.52
The Greens	790	1.92	+0.19
Christian People's Party	458	1.12	-0.19
Left Socialists	360	0.88	-1.14
Communist Party of Denmark	271	0.66	-0.58
Leif Hilt	3	0.01	New
Total	41,056		

1987 Danish general election

Parties	Vote		
Parties	Votes	%	+ / -
Social Democrats	11,599	27.57	-4.21
Green Left	8,424	20.02	+4.00
Conservatives	7,898	18.77	-2.82
Centre Democrats	4,199	9.98	+1.80
Social Liberals	3,189	7.58	+1.15
Progress Party	1,598	3.80	+0.93
Common Course	1,124	2.67	New
Venstre	1,011	2.40	-1.51
Left Socialists	848	2.02	-2.44
The Greens	726	1.73	New
Christian People's Party	551	1.31	-0.28
Communist Party of Denmark	520	1.24	+0.22
Justice Party of Denmark	246	0.58	-1.46
Humanist Party	99	0.24	New
Socialist Workers Party	23	0.05	-0.02
Marxist–Leninists Party	17	0.04	+0.02
Carsten Grøn-Nielsen	2	0.00	-0.01
Per Hillersborg	0	0.00	New
Total	42,074		

1984 Danish general election

Parties	Vote		
Parties	Votes	%	+ / -
Social Democrats	13,707	31.78	+0.02
Conservatives	9,310	21.59	+6.30
Green Left	6,910	16.02	+0.60
Centre Democrats	3,528	8.18	-4.18
Social Liberals	2,773	6.43	+0.86
Left Socialists	1,923	4.46	-0.56
Venstre	1,686	3.91	+1.32
Progress Party	1,238	2.87	-4.11
Justice Party of Denmark	881	2.04	+0.05
Christian People's Party	687	1.59	+0.43
Communist Party of Denmark	438	1.02	-0.58
Socialist Workers Party	29	0.07	-0.01
Marxist–Leninists Party	10	0.02	New
Carsten Grøn-Nielsen	6	0.01	New
Mogens Nebelong	3	0.01	0.00
Poul Rasmussen	1	0.00	New
Total	43,130		

1981 Danish general election

Parties	Vote		
Parties	Votes	%	+ / -
Social Democrats	13,022	31.76	-7.30
Green Left	6,323	15.42	+7.46
Conservatives	6,271	15.29	+2.52
Centre Democrats	5,066	12.36	+6.76
Progress Party	2,860	6.98	-1.15
Social Liberals	2,285	5.57	-1.18
Left Socialists	2,060	5.02	-2.10
Venstre	1,060	2.59	-1.89
Justice Party of Denmark	815	1.99	-1.73
Communist Party of Denmark	655	1.60	-0.94
Christian People's Party	475	1.16	-0.06
Communist Workers Party	74	0.18	-0.47
Socialist Workers Party	31	0.08	New
Mogens Nebelong	6	0.01	New
Total	41,003		

=== General elections in the 1970s ===
1979 Danish general election

Parties	Vote		
Parties	Votes	%	+ / -
Social Democrats	16,470	39.06	+1.82
Conservatives	5,384	12.77	+4.78
Progress Party	3,427	8.13	-3.70
Green Left	3,358	7.96	+1.82
Left Socialists	3,002	7.12	+1.95
Social Liberals	2,846	6.75	+3.75
Centre Democrats	2,360	5.60	-7.88
Venstre	1,888	4.48	+1.22
Justice Party of Denmark	1,570	3.72	-0.83
Communist Party of Denmark	1,070	2.54	-2.40
Christian People's Party	516	1.22	-0.31
Communist Workers Party	276	0.65	New
Total	42,167		

1977 Danish general election

Parties	Vote		
Parties	Votes	%	+ / -
Social Democrats	15,854	37.24	+9.98
Centre Democrats	5,738	13.48	+5.51
Progress Party	5,035	11.83	-1.58
Conservatives	3,402	7.99	+1.59
Green Left	2,615	6.14	-2.74
Left Socialists	2,202	5.17	+1.05
Communist Party of Denmark	2,104	4.94	-1.13
Justice Party of Denmark	1,936	4.55	+2.15
Venstre	1,389	3.26	-10.61
Social Liberals	1,275	3.00	-3.37
Christian People's Party	651	1.53	-1.70
Pensioners' Party	366	0.86	New
Otto Jensen	0	0.00	New
Poul Rasmussen	0	0.00	New
Total	42,567		

1975 Danish general election

Parties	Vote		
Parties	Votes	%	+ / -
Social Democrats	11,617	27.26	+8.83
Venstre	5,910	13.87	+9.30
Progress Party	5,713	13.41	-0.37
Green Left	3,783	8.88	-0.66
Centre Democrats	3,396	7.97	-15.36
Conservatives	2,729	6.40	-2.42
Social Liberals	2,714	6.37	-0.94
Communist Party of Denmark	2,587	6.07	+0.39
Left Socialists	1,755	4.12	+1.16
Christian People's Party	1,378	3.23	+1.19
Justice Party of Denmark	1,022	2.40	-1.13
J. G. Amdrejcak	4	0.01	New
Kai Clemmensen	1	0.00	New
Poul Friborg	0	0.00	New
Henning Glahn	0	0.00	New
Total	42,609		

1973 Danish general election

Parties	Vote		
Parties	Votes	%	+ / -
Centre Democrats	10,252	23.33	New
Social Democrats	8,101	18.43	-20.61
Progress Party	6,057	13.78	New
Green Left	4,193	9.54	-4.29
Conservatives	3,877	8.82	-12.38
Social Liberals	3,211	7.31	-5.46
Communist Party of Denmark	2,497	5.68	+3.66
Venstre	2,008	4.57	-0.43
Justice Party of Denmark	1,551	3.53	+1.60
Left Socialists	1,300	2.96	-0.21
Christian People's Party	896	2.04	+1.21
Erik Dissing	6	0.01	New
Total	43,949		

1971 Danish general election

Parties	Vote		
Parties	Votes	%	+ / -
Social Democrats	16,826	39.04	+5.61
Conservatives	9,136	21.20	-7.38
Green Left	5,958	13.83	+5.92
Social Liberals	5,502	12.77	-4.28
Venstre	2,155	5.00	+0.58
Left Socialists	1,367	3.17	-0.61
Communist Party of Denmark	869	2.02	+0.57
Justice Party of Denmark	832	1.93	+1.43
Christian People's Party	356	0.83	New
Henning Berthelsen	94	0.22	New
Total	43,095		

=== General elections in the 1960s ===
1968 Danish general election

Parties	Vote		
Parties	Votes	%	+ / -
Social Democrats	14,383	33.43	-2.87
Conservatives	12,296	28.58	+1.53
Social Liberals	7,337	17.05	+9.32
Green Left	3,402	7.91	-7.67
Venstre	1,903	4.42	-1.46
Left Socialists	1,625	3.78	New
Liberal Centre	1,155	2.68	-2.31
Communist Party of Denmark	623	1.45	+0.34
Justice Party of Denmark	213	0.50	+0.06
Independent Party	88	0.20	-0.70
H. Søndersted Andersen	0	0.00	New
Kirsten Lonning	0	0.00	New
Thode karlsen	0	0.00	-0.01
Total	43,025		

1966 Danish general election

Parties	Vote		
Parties	Votes	%	+ / -
Social Democrats	15,380	36.30	-7.68
Conservatives	11,461	27.05	-0.46
Green Left	6,602	15.58	+6.11
Social Liberals	3,275	7.73	+3.52
Venstre	2,492	5.88	-3.30
Liberal Centre	2,114	4.99	New
Communist Party of Denmark	469	1.11	-0.81
Independent Party	380	0.90	-0.98
Justice Party of Denmark	188	0.44	-0.52
Thode Karlsen	5	0.01	New
Total	42,366		

1964 Danish general election

Parties	Vote		
Parties	Votes	%	+ / -
Social Democrats	35,216	43.98	-2.79
Conservatives	22,022	27.51	+2.61
Green Left	7,580	9.47	-0.99
Venstre	7,351	9.18	+1.15
Social Liberals	3,369	4.21	+0.09
Communist Party of Denmark	1,535	1.92	+0.20
Independent Party	1,508	1.88	-0.31
Justice Party of Denmark	766	0.96	-0.86
Peace Politics People's Party	402	0.50	New
Danish Unity	282	0.35	New
Elin Høgsbro Appel	33	0.04	New
Total	80,064		

1960 Danish general election

Parties	Vote		
Parties	Votes	%	+ / -
Social Democrats	33,272	46.77	+1.93
Conservatives	17,714	24.90	+1.86
Green Left	7,438	10.46	New
Venstre	5,710	8.03	-2.97
Social Liberals	2,933	4.12	-3.24
Independent Party	1,555	2.19	+0.59
Justice Party of Denmark	1,294	1.82	-4.80
Communist Party of Denmark	1,220	1.72	-3.81
Total	71,136		

=== General elections in the 1950s ===
1957 Danish general election

Parties	Vote		
Parties	Votes	%	+ / -
Social Democrats	26,055	44.84	-3.03
Conservatives	13,390	23.04	+0.49
Venstre	6,394	11.00	+2.20
Social Liberals	4,279	7.36	+0.30
Justice Party of Denmark	3,849	6.62	+2.70
Communist Party of Denmark	3,213	5.53	-2.45
Independent Party	929	1.60	-0.20
Total	58,109		

September 1953 Danish Folketing election

Parties	Vote		
Parties	Votes	%	+ / -
Social Democrats	21,435	47.87	+0.99
Conservatives	10,097	22.55	+0.32
Venstre	3,942	8.80	+2.30
Communist Party of Denmark	3,573	7.98	-0.37
Social Liberals	3,163	7.06	-0.92
Justice Party of Denmark	1,756	3.92	-2.87
Independent Party	808	1.80	New
Total	44,774		

April 1953 Danish Folketing election

Parties	Vote		
Parties	Votes	%	+ / -
Social Democrats	19,519	46.88	-0.61
Conservatives	9,256	22.23	+0.73
Communist Party of Denmark	3,476	8.35	-0.38
Social Liberals	3,324	7.98	+1.18
Justice Party of Denmark	2,829	6.79	-4.18
Venstre	2,705	6.50	+2.00
Danish Unity	528	1.27	New
Total	41,637		

1950 Danish Folketing election

Parties	Vote		
Parties	Votes	%	+ / -
Social Democrats	15,860	47.49	
Conservatives	7,181	21.50	
Justice Party of Denmark	3,662	10.97	
Communist Party of Denmark	2,915	8.73	
Social Liberals	2,272	6.80	
Venstre	1,503	4.50	
Total	33,393		

== European Parliament elections results ==
2024 European Parliament election in Denmark

Parties	Vote		
Parties	Votes	%	+ / -
Green Left	6,143	22.34	+4.60
Social Democrats	4,589	16.69	-5.17
Social Liberals	2,838	10.32	-3.27
Venstre	2,646	9.62	-5.69
Red–Green Alliance	2,610	9.49	+2.85
Conservatives	2,303	8.38	+2.29
Liberal Alliance	1,694	6.16	+4.21
Moderates	1,655	6.02	New
Danish People's Party	1,521	5.53	-2.98
The Alternative	808	2.94	-0.76
Denmark Democrats	685	2.49	New
Total	27,492		

2019 European Parliament election in Denmark

Parties	Vote		
Parties	Votes	%	+ / -
Social Democrats	6,854	21.86	+0.15
Green Left	5,563	17.74	+4.04
Venstre	4,799	15.31	+4.22
Social Liberals	4,260	13.59	+4.60
Danish People's Party	2,667	8.51	-14.74
Red–Green Alliance	2,083	6.64	New
Conservatives	1,908	6.09	-1.14
People's Movement against the EU	1,444	4.61	-6.44
The Alternative	1,160	3.70	New
Liberal Alliance	612	1.95	-1.02
Total	31,350		

2014 European Parliament election in Denmark

Parties	Vote		
Parties	Votes	%	+ / -
Danish People's Party	6,338	23.25	+8.51
Social Democrats	5,918	21.71	+0.63
Green Left	3,736	13.70	-4.34
Venstre	3,024	11.09	-2.24
People's Movement against the EU	3,013	11.05	-2.97
Social Liberals	2,452	8.99	+3.14
Conservatives	1,970	7.23	-2.91
Liberal Alliance	810	2.97	+2.29
Total	27,261		

2009 European Parliament election in Denmark

Parties	Vote		
Parties	Votes	%	+ / -
Social Democrats	5,880	21.08	-10.51
Green Left	5,032	18.04	+7.38
Danish People's Party	4,112	14.74	+7.27
People's Movement against the EU	3,912	14.02	+4.65
Venstre	3,720	13.33	+1.33
Conservatives	2,828	10.14	-1.02
Social Liberals	1,633	5.85	-1.66
June Movement	592	2.12	-7.23
Liberal Alliance	191	0.68	New
Total	27,900		

2004 European Parliament election in Denmark

Parties	Vote		
Parties	Votes	%	+ / -
Social Democrats	7,481	31.59	+15.92
Venstre	2,841	12.00	-2.67
Conservatives	2,643	11.16	+3.25
Green Left	2,525	10.66	+0.68
People's Movement against the EU	2,219	9.37	+0.24
June Movement	2,214	9.35	-8.90
Social Liberals	1,779	7.51	-2.44
Danish People's Party	1,770	7.47	-0.29
Christian Democrats	207	0.87	-0.41
Total	23,679		

1999 European Parliament election in Denmark

Parties	Vote		
Parties	Votes	%	+ / -
June Movement	4,613	18.25	-0.32
Social Democrats	3,960	15.67	+0.96
Venstre	3,709	14.67	+4.73
Green Left	2,522	9.98	-2.10
Social Liberals	2,515	9.95	-0.33
People's Movement against the EU	2,307	9.13	-3.36
Conservatives	2,000	7.91	-8.97
Danish People's Party	1,962	7.76	New
Centre Democrats	1,366	5.40	+3.65
Christian Democrats	323	1.28	+0.58
Progress Party	103	0.41	-2.19
Total	25,277		

1994 European Parliament election in Denmark

Parties	Vote		
Parties	Votes	%	+ / -
June Movement	5,032	18.57	New
Conservatives	4,576	16.88	+4.70
Social Democrats	3,986	14.71	-6.70
People's Movement against the EU	3,384	12.49	-13.64
Green Left	3,273	12.08	+0.19
Social Liberals	2,787	10.28	+7.67
Venstre	2,695	9.94	+3.02
Progress Party	704	2.60	-1.18
Centre Democrats	473	1.75	-11.88
Christian Democrats	191	0.70	-0.76
Total	27,101		

1989 European Parliament election in Denmark

Parties	Vote		
Parties	Votes	%	+ / -
People's Movement against the EU	6,522	26.13	-3.49
Social Democrats	5,344	21.41	+3.68
Centre Democrats	3,402	13.63	+2.69
Conservatives	3,040	12.18	-5.11
Green Left	2,969	11.89	-0.84
Venstre	1,728	6.92	+4.37
Progress Party	943	3.78	+0.86
Social Liberals	651	2.61	-0.37
Christian Democrats	365	1.46	-0.13
Total	24,964		

1984 European Parliament election in Denmark

Parties	Vote	
Parties	Votes	%
People's Movement against the EU	8,132	29.62
Social Democrats	4,867	17.73
Conservatives	4,747	17.29
Green Left	3,494	12.73
Centre Democrats	3,004	10.94
Social Liberals	817	2.98
Progress Party	802	2.92
Venstre	699	2.55
Left Socialists	459	1.67
Christian Democrats	436	1.59
Total	27,457	

== Referendums ==
2022 Danish European Union opt-out referendum

Option	Votes	%
✓ YES	20,642	69.07
X NO	9,244	30.93

2015 Danish European Union opt-out referendum

Option	Votes	%
X NO	16,589	51.05
✓ YES	15,905	48.95

2014 Danish Unified Patent Court membership referendum

Option	Votes	%
✓ YES	16,400	61.34
X NO	10,338	38.66

2009 Danish Act of Succession referendum

Option	Votes	%
✓ YES	20,916	84.26
X NO	3,907	15.74

2000 Danish euro referendum

Option	Votes	%
X NO	22,229	55.60
✓ YES	17,751	44.40

1998 Danish Amsterdam Treaty referendum

Option	Votes	%
✓ YES	18,445	51.53
X NO	17,349	48.47

1993 Danish Maastricht Treaty referendum

Option	Votes	%
✓ YES	21,417	52.16
X NO	19,641	47.84

1992 Danish Maastricht Treaty referendum

Option	Votes	%
X NO	22,006	55.04
✓ YES	17,975	44.96

1986 Danish Single European Act referendum

Option	Votes	%
X NO	20,297	54.24
✓ YES	17,123	45.76

1972 Danish European Communities membership referendum

Option	Votes	%
✓ YES	24,736	54.10
X NO	20,986	45.90

1953 Danish constitutional and electoral age referendum

Option	Votes	%
✓ YES	23,270	74.05
X NO	8,156	25.95
21 years	16,758	50.79
23 years	16,235	49.21
