= Brønshøj (nomination district) =

- Brønshøj
- Nomination district constituency for the Folketing
- Location of Brønshøj within Copenhagen

- Location of Copenhagen within Denmark
- Municipalities: Copenhagen
- Constituency: Copenhagen
- Electorate: 54,678 (2022)

Current constituency
- Created: 1950

Brønshøj nominating district is one of the 92 nominating districts that exists for Danish elections following the 2007 municipal reform. It is one of the 9 nominating districts in Copenhagen Municipality. It was created in 1950, though its boundaries have been changed since then.

In general elections, the district is a very strong area for parties commonly associated with the red bloc, meaning the center-left parties, having been the district where they received their third highest vote share in the 2022 election.

== General elections results ==
=== General elections in the 2020s ===
2022 Danish general election

Parties	Vote		
Parties	Votes	%	+ / -
Social Democrats	10,176	23.05	+2.25
Green Left	5,928	13.42	+0.50
Red–Green Alliance	5,792	13.12	-2.45
Moderates	3,630	8.22	New
The Alternative	3,355	7.60	+2.00
Venstre	3,197	7.24	-5.46
Social Liberals	2,961	6.71	-8.47
Liberal Alliance	2,824	6.40	+4.39
Conservatives	1,866	4.23	-0.37
Independent Greens	1,658	3.75	New
Denmark Democrats	922	2.09	New
Danish People's Party	887	2.01	-3.59
New Right	756	1.71	+0.07
Christian Democrats	130	0.29	-0.64
Flemming Blicher	53	0.12	New
Tom Gillesberg	22	0.05	+0.02
Total	44,157		

=== General elections in the 2010s ===
2019 Danish general election

Parties	Vote		
Parties	Votes	%	+ / -
Social Democrats	9,577	20.80	-4.75
Red–Green Alliance	7,169	15.57	-0.30
Social Liberals	6,989	15.18	+7.72
Green Left	5,949	12.92	+5.15
Venstre	5,848	12.70	+2.90
Danish People's Party	2,579	5.60	-8.84
The Alternative	2,577	5.60	-3.08
Conservatives	2,117	4.60	+1.85
Liberal Alliance	925	2.01	-4.92
New Right	755	1.64	New
Stram Kurs	658	1.43	New
Christian Democrats	430	0.93	+0.41
Klaus Riskær Pedersen Party	407	0.88	New
Pierre Tavares	32	0.07	New
Tom Gillesberg	13	0.03	0.00
John Jørgensen	8	0.02	New
John Erik Wagner	3	0.01	-0.01
Tommy Schou Christesen	0	0.00	New
Total	46,036		

2015 Danish general election

Parties	Vote		
Parties	Votes	%	+ / -
Social Democrats	11,540	25.55	+2.86
Red–Green Alliance	7,170	15.87	+0.92
Danish People's Party	6,523	14.44	+3.30
Venstre	4,428	9.80	-4.83
The Alternative	3,921	8.68	New
Green Left	3,509	7.77	-5.69
Social Liberals	3,369	7.46	-6.02
Liberal Alliance	3,130	6.93	+2.41
Conservatives	1,240	2.75	-1.91
Christian Democrats	235	0.52	+0.13
Kashif Ahmad	81	0.18	New
Tom Gillesberg	15	0.03	0.00
John Erik Wagner	8	0.02	+0.01
Jan Elkjær	0	0.00	New
Total	45,169		

2011 Danish general election

Parties	Vote		
Parties	Votes	%	+ / -
Social Democrats	10,305	22.69	-4.41
Red–Green Alliance	6,790	14.95	+9.41
Venstre	6,647	14.63	+1.23
Social Liberals	6,125	13.48	+6.41
Green Left	6,112	13.46	-6.94
Danish People's Party	5,060	11.14	-2.53
Conservatives	2,119	4.66	-3.92
Liberal Alliance	2,051	4.52	+0.90
Christian Democrats	176	0.39	-0.21
Klaus Trier Tuxen	19	0.04	New
Tom Gillesberg	12	0.03	+0.02
Mads Vestergaard	4	0.01	New
John Erik Wagner	3	0.01	+0.01
Morten Versner	1	0.00	New
Per Zimmermann	1	0.00	New
Total	45,425		

=== General elections in the 2000s ===
2007 Danish general election

Parties	Vote		
Parties	Votes	%	+ / -
Social Democrats	12,213	27.10	+3.26
Green Left	9,194	20.40	+11.37
Danish People's Party	6,159	13.67	+0.98
Venstre	6,040	13.40	-4.31
Conservatives	3,865	8.58	-0.78
Social Liberals	3,188	7.07	-8.22
Red–Green Alliance	2,495	5.54	-3.65
New Alliance	1,633	3.62	New
Christian Democrats	269	0.60	-0.67
Tom Gillesberg	4	0.01	New
Nicolai Krogh Mittet	2	0.00	New
Amir Becirovic	1	0.00	New
Vibeke Baden Laursen	1	0.00	New
John Erik Wagner	1	0.00	New
Total	45,065		

2005 Danish general election

Parties	Vote		
Parties	Votes	%	+ / -
Social Democrats	6,460	23.84	-4.44
Venstre	4,798	17.71	-3.72
Social Liberals	4,142	15.29	+6.18
Danish People's Party	3,439	12.69	+0.25
Conservatives	2,537	9.36	+1.44
Red–Green Alliance	2,491	9.19	+4.26
Green Left	2,446	9.03	-2.44
Christian Democrats	345	1.27	-0.51
Centre Democrats	335	1.24	-0.89
Minority Party	101	0.37	New
Feride Istogu Gillesberg	4	0.01	New
Total	27,098		

2001 Danish general election

Parties	Vote		
Parties	Votes	%	+ / -
Social Democrats	7,918	28.28	-7.75
Venstre	6,000	21.43	+6.43
Danish People's Party	3,483	12.44	+3.31
Green Left	3,213	11.47	-0.62
Social Liberals	2,552	9.11	+3.88
Conservatives	2,218	7.92	-0.43
Red–Green Alliance	1,380	4.93	-1.25
Centre Democrats	597	2.13	-2.23
Christian People's Party	498	1.78	-0.10
Progress Party	97	0.35	-1.06
Lars Hutters	46	0.16	New
Total	28,002		

=== General elections in the 1990s ===
1998 Danish general election

Parties	Vote		
Parties	Votes	%	+ / -
Social Democrats	10,047	36.03	+1.23
Venstre	4,182	15.00	+0.86
Green Left	3,371	12.09	+0.01
Danish People's Party	2,545	9.13	New
Conservatives	2,328	8.35	-7.02
Red–Green Alliance	1,722	6.18	-0.51
Social Liberals	1,459	5.23	-0.47
Centre Democrats	1,216	4.36	+1.20
Christian People's Party	524	1.88	+0.47
Progress Party	392	1.41	-4.75
Democratic Renewal	96	0.34	New
Total	27,882		

1994 Danish general election

Parties	Vote		
Parties	Votes	%	+ / -
Social Democrats	9,532	34.80	-4.02
Conservatives	4,211	15.37	-0.71
Venstre	3,873	14.14	+6.27
Green Left	3,309	12.08	-1.59
Red–Green Alliance	1,833	6.69	+2.78
Progress Party	1,688	6.16	+2.47
Social Liberals	1,561	5.70	+2.16
Centre Democrats	865	3.16	-2.30
Christian People's Party	387	1.41	-0.01
Villo Sigurdsson	70	0.26	New
Jørgen Tved	47	0.17	New
Birgitte Bjerring Sonneby	17	0.06	New
Total	27,393		

1990 Danish general election

Parties	Vote		
Parties	Votes	%	+ / -
Social Democrats	10,542	38.82	+9.81
Conservatives	4,367	16.08	-3.65
Green Left	3,713	13.67	-7.81
Venstre	2,138	7.87	+3.83
Centre Democrats	1,482	5.46	+0.97
Red–Green Alliance	1,063	3.91	New
Progress Party	1,001	3.69	-3.16
Social Liberals	961	3.54	-2.36
Common Course	955	3.52	+1.26
Christian People's Party	386	1.42	+0.14
The Greens	352	1.30	-0.59
Justice Party of Denmark	169	0.62	New
Humanist Party	16	0.06	New
Abdul Wahid Pedersen	8	0.03	New
Annette Dybdal	4	0.01	New
Total	27,157		

=== General elections in the 1980s ===
1988 Danish general election

Parties	Vote		
Parties	Votes	%	+ / -
Social Democrats	8,304	29.01	+1.54
Green Left	6,147	21.48	-1.74
Conservatives	5,648	19.73	+0.12
Progress Party	1,961	6.85	+2.91
Social Liberals	1,689	5.90	-0.75
Centre Democrats	1,284	4.49	-0.25
Venstre	1,155	4.04	+1.54
Common Course	646	2.26	-0.24
The Greens	542	1.89	-0.10
Communist Party of Denmark	468	1.64	0.00
Left Socialists	413	1.44	-2.01
Christian People's Party	365	1.28	-0.24
Total	28,622		

1987 Danish general election

Parties	Vote		
Parties	Votes	%	+ / -
Social Democrats	7,969	27.47	-5.98
Green Left	6,738	23.22	+4.72
Conservatives	5,690	19.61	-3.23
Social Liberals	1,929	6.65	+1.01
Centre Democrats	1,374	4.74	+0.86
Progress Party	1,143	3.94	+1.36
Left Socialists	1,000	3.45	-1.27
Venstre	726	2.50	-1.17
Common Course	725	2.50	New
The Greens	576	1.99	New
Communist Party of Denmark	476	1.64	+0.37
Christian People's Party	441	1.52	-0.16
Justice Party of Denmark	143	0.49	-1.22
Humanist Party	67	0.23	New
Socialist Workers Party	11	0.04	-0.01
Marxist–Leninists Party	5	0.02	0.00
Total	29,013		

1984 Danish general election

Parties	Vote		
Parties	Votes	%	+ / -
Social Democrats	10,305	33.45	-0.52
Conservatives	7,036	22.84	+7.44
Green Left	5,699	18.50	+0.62
Social Liberals	1,736	5.64	+0.60
Left Socialists	1,454	4.72	-0.21
Centre Democrats	1,195	3.88	-3.79
Venstre	1,131	3.67	+0.96
Progress Party	794	2.58	-4.48
Justice Party of Denmark	526	1.71	+0.04
Christian People's Party	518	1.68	+0.33
Communist Party of Denmark	390	1.27	-0.77
Socialist Workers Party	16	0.05	-0.02
Marxist–Leninists Party	7	0.02	New
Total	30,807		

1981 Danish general election

Parties	Vote		
Parties	Votes	%	+ / -
Social Democrats	9,980	33.97	-8.08
Green Left	5,252	17.88	+9.00
Conservatives	4,525	15.40	+1.52
Centre Democrats	2,254	7.67	+4.93
Progress Party	2,074	7.06	-0.83
Social Liberals	1,480	5.04	-0.82
Left Socialists	1,447	4.93	-0.92
Venstre	797	2.71	-1.58
Communist Party of Denmark	599	2.04	-1.09
Justice Party of Denmark	490	1.67	-1.56
Christian People's Party	397	1.35	-0.16
Communist Workers Party	62	0.21	-0.45
Socialist Workers Party	22	0.07	New
Total	29,379		

=== General elections in the 1970s ===
1979 Danish general election

Parties	Vote		
Parties	Votes	%	+ / -
Social Democrats	12,781	42.05	-0.39
Conservatives	4,218	13.88	+4.35
Green Left	2,700	8.88	+2.93
Progress Party	2,399	7.89	-3.03
Social Liberals	1,781	5.86	+2.30
Left Socialists	1,777	5.85	+1.93
Venstre	1,304	4.29	+0.66
Justice Party of Denmark	983	3.23	-0.84
Communist Party of Denmark	950	3.13	-2.51
Centre Democrats	834	2.74	-4.17
Christian People's Party	458	1.51	-0.44
Communist Workers Party	201	0.66	New
Leni Thomsen	10	0.03	New
Total	30,396		

1977 Danish general election

Parties	Vote		
Parties	Votes	%	+ / -
Social Democrats	13,407	42.44	+9.24
Progress Party	3,449	10.92	-1.02
Conservatives	3,010	9.53	+2.89
Centre Democrats	2,183	6.91	+5.01
Green Left	1,879	5.95	-1.95
Communist Party of Denmark	1,781	5.64	-0.87
Justice Party of Denmark	1,286	4.07	+2.17
Left Socialists	1,239	3.92	+0.55
Venstre	1,148	3.63	-12.12
Social Liberals	1,123	3.56	-3.35
Christian People's Party	617	1.95	-1.98
Pensioners' Party	463	1.47	New
Karen T. Christensen	4	0.01	New
Total	31,589		

1975 Danish general election

Parties	Vote		
Parties	Votes	%	+ / -
Social Democrats	10,838	33.20	+5.02
Venstre	5,141	15.75	+11.34
Progress Party	3,899	11.94	-0.40
Green Left	2,579	7.90	-2.22
Social Liberals	2,257	6.91	-2.65
Conservatives	2,168	6.64	-6.40
Communist Party of Denmark	2,124	6.51	+0.30
Christian People's Party	1,282	3.93	+1.37
Left Socialists	1,101	3.37	+0.96
Justice Party of Denmark	621	1.90	-1.45
Centre Democrats	619	1.90	-5.89
Birgit Busk	13	0.04	New
Total	32,642		

1973 Danish general election

Parties	Vote		
Parties	Votes	%	+ / -
Social Democrats	9,520	28.18	-7.34
Conservatives	4,404	13.04	-10.13
Progress Party	4,170	12.34	New
Green Left	3,419	10.12	-5.52
Social Liberals	3,229	9.56	-3.60
Centre Democrats	2,631	7.79	New
Communist Party of Denmark	2,098	6.21	+4.18
Venstre	1,491	4.41	-0.54
Justice Party of Denmark	1,131	3.35	+1.79
Christian People's Party	864	2.56	+1.47
Left Socialists	815	2.41	-0.47
Gunnar Skou	11	0.03	New
Total	33,783		

1971 Danish general election

Parties	Vote		
Parties	Votes	%	+ / -
Social Democrats	12,044	35.52	-4.22
Conservatives	7,856	23.17	-1.47
Green Left	5,304	15.64	+6.23
Social Liberals	4,464	13.16	-1.75
Venstre	1,680	4.95	+1.12
Left Socialists	975	2.88	-0.46
Communist Party of Denmark	688	2.03	+0.22
Justice Party of Denmark	529	1.56	+1.16
Christian People's Party	368	1.09	New
Kaare Heistein Sørensen	2	0.01	New
Total	33,910		

=== General elections in the 1960s ===
1968 Danish general election

Parties	Vote		
Parties	Votes	%	+ / -
Social Democrats	19,935	39.74	+2.29
Conservatives	12,361	24.64	+0.77
Social Liberals	7,479	14.91	+7.82
Green Left	4,720	9.41	-10.05
Venstre	1,919	3.83	-1.53
Left Socialists	1,677	3.34	New
Communist Party of Denmark	906	1.81	+0.28
Liberal Centre	833	1.66	-2.17
Justice Party of Denmark	200	0.40	-0.03
Independent Party	118	0.24	-0.75
Kristine Heide	12	0.02	New
Total	50,160		

1966 Danish general election

Parties	Vote		
Parties	Votes	%	+ / -
Social Democrats	17,464	37.45	-7.28
Conservatives	11,132	23.87	-2.48
Green Left	9,077	19.46	+8.98
Social Liberals	3,306	7.09	+2.47
Venstre	2,498	5.36	-2.81
Liberal Centre	1,784	3.83	New
Communist Party of Denmark	713	1.53	-0.69
Independent Party	462	0.99	-0.83
Justice Party of Denmark	199	0.43	-0.35
Total	46,635		

1964 Danish general election

Parties	Vote		
Parties	Votes	%	+ / -
Social Democrats	20,474	44.73	-1.30
Conservatives	12,061	26.35	+0.77
Green Left	4,797	10.48	-1.07
Venstre	3,739	8.17	+1.75
Social Liberals	2,115	4.62	-0.35
Communist Party of Denmark	1,016	2.22	+0.35
Independent Party	831	1.82	-0.37
Justice Party of Denmark	358	0.78	-0.62
Peace Politics People's Party	213	0.47	New
Danish Unity	170	0.37	New
Total	45,774		

1960 Danish general election

Parties	Vote		
Parties	Votes	%	+ / -
Social Democrats	20,818	46.03	+1.89
Conservatives	11,568	25.58	+0.21
Green Left	5,225	11.55	New
Venstre	2,903	6.42	-2.97
Social Liberals	2,247	4.97	-3.25
Independent Party	990	2.19	+0.77
Communist Party of Denmark	847	1.87	-4.17
Justice Party of Denmark	632	1.40	-4.01
Total	45,230		

=== General elections in the 1950s ===
1957 Danish general election

Parties	Vote		
Parties	Votes	%	+ / -
Social Democrats	18,824	44.14	-2.27
Conservatives	10,819	25.37	-0.21
Venstre	4,006	9.39	+2.94
Social Liberals	3,506	8.22	+0.36
Communist Party of Denmark	2,577	6.04	-2.56
Justice Party of Denmark	2,308	5.41	+2.00
Independent Party	606	1.42	-0.26
Total	42,646		

September 1953 Danish Folketing election

Parties	Vote		
Parties	Votes	%	+ / -
Social Democrats	18,051	46.41	+0.90
Conservatives	9,950	25.58	+1.12
Communist Party of Denmark	3,346	8.60	-0.39
Social Liberals	3,059	7.86	-1.16
Venstre	2,510	6.45	+1.71
Justice Party of Denmark	1,326	3.41	-2.83
Independent Party	652	1.68	New
Total	38,894		

April 1953 Danish Folketing election

Parties	Vote		
Parties	Votes	%	+ / -
Social Democrats	17,266	45.51	+0.13
Conservatives	9,280	24.46	-0.13
Social Liberals	3,422	9.02	+1.16
Communist Party of Denmark	3,410	8.99	+0.02
Justice Party of Denmark	2,368	6.24	-4.26
Venstre	1,798	4.74	+2.04
Danish Unity	393	1.04	New
Total	37,937		

1950 Danish Folketing election

Parties	Vote		
Parties	Votes	%	+ / -
Social Democrats	17,030	45.38	
Conservatives	9,229	24.59	
Justice Party of Denmark	3,942	10.50	
Communist Party of Denmark	3,368	8.97	
Social Liberals	2,948	7.86	
Venstre	1,013	2.70	
Total	37,530		

== European Parliament elections results ==
2024 European Parliament election in Denmark

Parties	Vote		
Parties	Votes	%	+ / -
Green Left	9,473	28.43	+5.48
Red–Green Alliance	5,632	16.90	+6.07
Social Democrats	4,161	12.49	-5.54
Social Liberals	3,484	10.45	-4.25
Conservatives	2,173	6.52	+1.34
Venstre	2,064	6.19	-4.1
Liberal Alliance	1,610	4.83	+3.32
Moderates	1,515	4.55	New
The Alternative	1,448	4.35	-1.13
Danish People's Party	1,298	3.89	-2.82
Denmark Democrats	467	1.40	New
Total	33,325		

2019 European Parliament election in Denmark

Parties	Vote		
Parties	Votes	%	+ / -
Green Left	8,530	22.95	+3.28
Social Democrats	6,704	18.03	-2.70
Social Liberals	5,464	14.70	+4.65
Red–Green Alliance	4,026	10.83	New
Venstre	3,826	10.29	+2.00
Danish People's Party	2,494	6.71	-12.69
The Alternative	2,036	5.48	New
Conservatives	1,926	5.18	-0.67
People's Movement against the EU	1,605	4.32	-8.99
Liberal Alliance	562	1.51	-1.19
Total	37,173		

2014 European Parliament election in Denmark

Parties	Vote		
Parties	Votes	%	+ / -
Social Democrats	6,282	20.73	-0.35
Green Left	5,960	19.67	-3.57
Danish People's Party	5,877	19.40	+5.60
People's Movement against the EU	4,033	13.31	+0.27
Social Liberals	3,046	10.05	+3.32
Venstre	2,512	8.29	-1.90
Conservatives	1,771	5.85	-1.72
Liberal Alliance	817	2.70	+2.00
Total	30,298		

2009 European Parliament election in Denmark

Parties	Vote		
Parties	Votes	%	+ / -
Green Left	7,201	23.24	+9.52
Social Democrats	6,533	21.08	-9.88
Danish People's Party	4,276	13.80	+7.46
People's Movement against the EU	4,042	13.04	+3.97
Venstre	3,157	10.19	+0.91
Conservatives	2,345	7.57	-1.40
Social Liberals	2,086	6.73	-3.09
June Movement	1,134	3.66	-7.36
Liberal Alliance	217	0.70	New
Total	30,991		

2004 European Parliament election in Denmark

Parties	Vote		
Parties	Votes	%	+ / -
Social Democrats	5,177	30.96	+16.27
Green Left	2,294	13.72	+2.25
June Movement	1,842	11.02	-9.10
Social Liberals	1,642	9.82	-0.94
Venstre	1,551	9.28	-3.68
People's Movement against the EU	1,516	9.07	-1.79
Conservatives	1,500	8.97	+2.06
Danish People's Party	1,060	6.34	-1.07
Christian Democrats	137	0.82	-0.42
Total	16,719		

1999 European Parliament election in Denmark

Parties	Vote		
Parties	Votes	%	+ / -
June Movement	3,513	20.12	-0.90
Social Democrats	2,565	14.69	+0.47
Venstre	2,262	12.96	+3.39
Green Left	2,003	11.47	-0.56
People's Movement against the EU	1,895	10.86	-4.11
Social Liberals	1,879	10.76	+1.93
Danish People's Party	1,293	7.41	New
Conservatives	1,206	6.91	-8.05
Centre Democrats	624	3.57	+2.50
Christian Democrats	217	1.24	+0.51
Progress Party	88	0.50	-2.10
Total	17,457		

1994 European Parliament election in Denmark

Parties	Vote		
Parties	Votes	%	+ / -
June Movement	3,861	21.02	New
People's Movement against the EU	2,751	14.97	-14.97
Conservatives	2,748	14.96	+3.45
Social Democrats	2,612	14.22	-7.34
Green Left	2,211	12.03	-2.44
Venstre	1,759	9.57	+2.70
Social Liberals	1,622	8.83	+5.98
Progress Party	478	2.60	-1.50
Centre Democrats	196	1.07	-6.01
Christian Democrats	134	0.73	-0.90
Total	18,372		

1989 European Parliament election in Denmark

Parties	Vote		
Parties	Votes	%	+ / -
People's Movement against the EU	5,187	29.94	+0.41
Social Democrats	3,735	21.56	+1.66
Green Left	2,506	14.47	+0.43
Conservatives	1,994	11.51	-6.94
Centre Democrats	1,226	7.08	+1.63
Venstre	1,190	6.87	+4.17
Progress Party	711	4.10	+0.64
Social Liberals	493	2.85	+0.56
Christian Democrats	282	1.63	-0.14
Total	17,324		

1984 European Parliament election in Denmark

Parties	Vote	
Parties	Votes	%
People's Movement against the EU	5,797	29.53
Social Democrats	3,907	19.90
Conservatives	3,622	18.45
Green Left	2,756	14.04
Centre Democrats	1,071	5.45
Progress Party	680	3.46
Venstre	531	2.70
Left Socialists	474	2.41
Social Liberals	449	2.29
Christian Democrats	347	1.77
Total	19,634	

== Referendums ==
2022 Danish European Union opt-out referendum

Option	Votes	%
✓ YES	22,649	67.20
X NO	11,053	32.80

2015 Danish European Union opt-out referendum

Option	Votes	%
X NO	19,085	52.54
✓ YES	17,239	47.46

2014 Danish Unified Patent Court membership referendum

Option	Votes	%
✓ YES	16,820	57.08
X NO	12,646	42.92

2009 Danish Act of Succession referendum

Option	Votes	%
✓ YES	21,980	83.93
X NO	4,208	16.07

2000 Danish euro referendum

Option	Votes	%
X NO	15,911	56.77
✓ YES	12,114	43.23

1998 Danish Amsterdam Treaty referendum

Option	Votes	%
X NO	12,854	51.91
✓ YES	11,909	48.09

1993 Danish Maastricht Treaty referendum

Option	Votes	%
X NO	14,957	52.77
✓ YES	13,389	47.23

1992 Danish Maastricht Treaty referendum

Option	Votes	%
X NO	16,467	59.75
✓ YES	11,094	40.25

1986 Danish Single European Act referendum

Option	Votes	%
X NO	15,270	58.69
✓ YES	10,747	41.31

1972 Danish European Communities membership referendum

Option	Votes	%
✓ YES	19,711	55.71
X NO	15,672	44.29

1953 Danish constitutional and electoral age referendum

Option	Votes	%
✓ YES	20,104	73.53
X NO	7,237	26.47
21 years	14,083	50.29
23 years	13,922	49.71
