= Hvidovre (nomination district) =

- Hvidovre
- Nomination district constituency for the Folketing
- Location of Hvidovre within Greater Copenhagen

- Location of Greater Copenhagen within Denmark
- Municipalities: Hvidovre
- Constituency: Greater Copenhagen
- Electorate: 36,088 (2022)

Current constituency
- Created: 1953

Hvidovre nominating district is one of the 92 nominating districts that exists for Danish elections following the 2007 municipal reform. It consists of Hvidovre Municipality. It was created in 1953, though its boundaries have been changed since then.

In general elections, the district is a strong area for parties commonly associated with the red bloc.

== General elections results ==
=== General elections in the 2020s ===
2022 Danish general election

Parties	Vote		
Parties	Votes	%	+ / -
Social Democrats	9,335	32.30	+2.90
Green Left	3,281	11.35	+0.02
Moderates	2,806	9.71	New
Venstre	2,330	8.06	-6.89
Liberal Alliance	1,762	6.10	+4.34
Red–Green Alliance	1,590	5.50	-2.40
Danish People's Party	1,358	4.70	-6.21
Denmark Democrats	1,331	4.60	New
Conservatives	1,328	4.59	-0.48
Social Liberals	1,231	4.26	-4.56
New Right	906	3.13	+0.75
The Alternative	806	2.79	-0.14
Independent Greens	701	2.43	New
Christian Democrats	97	0.34	-0.74
Jovan Tasevski	34	0.12	New
Henrik Vendelbo Petersen	8	0.03	New
Total	28,904		

=== General elections in the 2010s ===
2019 Danish general election

Parties	Vote		
Parties	Votes	%	+ / -
Social Democrats	8,886	29.40	-2.43
Venstre	4,518	14.95	+2.68
Green Left	3,424	11.33	+6.26
Danish People's Party	3,298	10.91	-14.47
Social Liberals	2,666	8.82	+5.18
Red–Green Alliance	2,389	7.90	-1.34
Conservatives	1,532	5.07	+2.68
The Alternative	886	2.93	-0.77
New Right	720	2.38	New
Stram Kurs	681	2.25	New
Liberal Alliance	533	1.76	-3.92
Christian Democrats	326	1.08	+0.64
Klaus Riskær Pedersen Party	258	0.85	New
Mads Palsvig	100	0.33	New
Christian B. Olesen	7	0.02	New
Total	30,224		

2015 Danish general election

Parties	Vote		
Parties	Votes	%	+ / -
Social Democrats	9,738	31.83	+3.17
Danish People's Party	7,764	25.38	+8.86
Venstre	3,752	12.27	-6.67
Red–Green Alliance	2,827	9.24	+0.69
Liberal Alliance	1,738	5.68	+1.80
Green Left	1,550	5.07	-5.29
The Alternative	1,132	3.70	New
Social Liberals	1,112	3.64	-4.81
Conservatives	730	2.39	-1.80
Christian Democrats	136	0.44	+0.10
Asif Ahmad	104	0.34	New
Christian Olesen	7	0.02	New
Total	30,590		

2011 Danish general election

Parties	Vote		
Parties	Votes	%	+ / -
Social Democrats	8,886	28.66	-2.16
Venstre	5,872	18.94	+1.65
Danish People's Party	5,121	16.52	-2.40
Green Left	3,213	10.36	-4.34
Red–Green Alliance	2,652	8.55	+5.79
Social Liberals	2,620	8.45	+4.23
Conservatives	1,298	4.19	-4.01
Liberal Alliance	1,204	3.88	+1.30
Christian Democrats	106	0.34	-0.16
Christian H. Hansen	31	0.10	New
Total	31,003		

=== General elections in the 2000s ===
2007 Danish general election

Parties	Vote		
Parties	Votes	%	+ / -
Social Democrats	9,371	30.82	-1.00
Danish People's Party	5,751	18.92	-0.36
Venstre	5,255	17.29	-3.09
Green Left	4,468	14.70	+8.04
Conservatives	2,492	8.20	+0.77
Social Liberals	1,282	4.22	-3.66
Red–Green Alliance	840	2.76	-1.54
New Alliance	784	2.58	New
Christian Democrats	153	0.50	-0.29
Janus Kramer Møller	5	0.02	New
Feride Istogu Gillesberg	1	0.00	New
Total	30,402		

2005 Danish general election

Parties	Vote		
Parties	Votes	%	+ / -
Social Democrats	15,821	31.82	-4.09
Venstre	10,134	20.38	-2.62
Danish People's Party	9,586	19.28	+1.78
Social Liberals	3,916	7.88	+4.01
Conservatives	3,692	7.43	+1.55
Green Left	3,313	6.66	-0.70
Red–Green Alliance	2,139	4.30	+1.23
Centre Democrats	566	1.14	-0.71
Christian Democrats	392	0.79	-0.43
Minority Party	123	0.25	New
Nahid Yazdanyar	37	0.07	New
Total	49,719		

2001 Danish general election

Parties	Vote		
Parties	Votes	%	+ / -
Social Democrats	18,480	35.91	-7.97
Venstre	11,836	23.00	+8.55
Danish People's Party	9,004	17.50	+5.77
Green Left	3,785	7.36	-1.70
Conservatives	3,028	5.88	-0.92
Social Liberals	1,993	3.87	+1.12
Red–Green Alliance	1,581	3.07	-0.53
Centre Democrats	950	1.85	-2.66
Christian People's Party	627	1.22	+0.12
Progress Party	173	0.34	-1.16
Total	51,457		

=== General elections in the 1990s ===
1998 Danish general election

Parties	Vote		
Parties	Votes	%	+ / -
Social Democrats	22,178	43.88	+3.06
Venstre	7,302	14.45	+1.27
Danish People's Party	5,927	11.73	New
Green Left	4,579	9.06	-0.76
Conservatives	3,435	6.80	-7.15
Centre Democrats	2,281	4.51	+0.64
Red–Green Alliance	1,821	3.60	-1.18
Social Liberals	1,390	2.75	-1.05
Progress Party	758	1.50	-5.73
Christian People's Party	558	1.10	+0.11
Democratic Renewal	166	0.33	New
Mogens Glistrup	139	0.28	-0.24
Poul Bregninge	4	0.01	New
Anders Kofoed	4	0.01	New
Total	50,542		

1994 Danish general election

Parties	Vote		
Parties	Votes	%	+ / -
Social Democrats	20,545	40.82	-6.16
Conservatives	7,023	13.95	-0.32
Venstre	6,635	13.18	+7.31
Green Left	4,940	9.82	-0.96
Progress Party	3,640	7.23	+3.05
Red–Green Alliance	2,408	4.78	+2.63
Centre Democrats	1,948	3.87	-3.05
Social Liberals	1,911	3.80	+0.94
Christian People's Party	500	0.99	+0.06
Mogens Glistrup	262	0.52	New
Preben Møller Hansen	251	0.50	New
Niels I. Meyer	248	0.49	New
Torben Faber	8	0.02	New
John Ziegler	8	0.02	New
Total	50,327		

1990 Danish general election

Parties	Vote		
Parties	Votes	%	+ / -
Social Democrats	23,832	46.98	+11.06
Conservatives	7,237	14.27	-1.81
Green Left	5,468	10.78	-9.15
Centre Democrats	3,511	6.92	+1.77
Venstre	2,978	5.87	+2.90
Progress Party	2,119	4.18	-3.32
Common Course	1,792	3.53	+0.55
Social Liberals	1,450	2.86	-2.59
Red–Green Alliance	1,093	2.15	New
Christian People's Party	474	0.93	+0.13
The Greens	399	0.79	-0.46
Justice Party of Denmark	363	0.72	New
Humanist Party	8	0.02	New
Total	50,724		

=== General elections in the 1980s ===
1988 Danish general election

Parties	Vote		
Parties	Votes	%	+ / -
Social Democrats	19,088	35.92	+4.51
Green Left	10,590	19.93	-3.73
Conservatives	8,546	16.08	-1.10
Progress Party	3,986	7.50	+3.33
Social Liberals	2,896	5.45	-0.37
Centre Democrats	2,736	5.15	-0.75
Common Course	1,585	2.98	-0.79
Venstre	1,576	2.97	+1.00
Communist Party of Denmark	666	1.25	-0.13
The Greens	664	1.25	-0.05
Christian People's Party	423	0.80	-0.17
Left Socialists	376	0.71	-0.83
Leif Hilt	6	0.01	New
Total	53,138		

1987 Danish general election

Parties	Vote		
Parties	Votes	%	+ / -
Social Democrats	16,468	31.41	-9.15
Green Left	12,406	23.66	+5.84
Conservatives	9,009	17.18	-2.15
Centre Democrats	3,094	5.90	+1.87
Social Liberals	3,051	5.82	+0.72
Progress Party	2,188	4.17	+1.14
Common Course	1,978	3.77	New
Venstre	1,032	1.97	-0.87
Left Socialists	806	1.54	-1.42
Communist Party of Denmark	724	1.38	+0.29
The Greens	681	1.30	New
Christian People's Party	508	0.97	-0.04
Justice Party of Denmark	318	0.61	-1.50
Humanist Party	109	0.21	New
Socialist Workers Party	42	0.08	0.00
Marxist–Leninists Party	14	0.03	+0.01
Carsten Grøn-Nielsen	2	0.00	-0.01
Per Hillersborg	2	0.00	New
Total	52,432		

1984 Danish general election

Parties	Vote		
Parties	Votes	%	+ / -
Social Democrats	22,896	40.56	-0.09
Conservatives	10,911	19.33	+6.98
Green Left	10,061	17.82	+0.61
Social Liberals	2,877	5.10	+0.32
Centre Democrats	2,273	4.03	-2.91
Progress Party	1,709	3.03	-4.38
Left Socialists	1,672	2.96	-0.67
Venstre	1,604	2.84	+0.74
Justice Party of Denmark	1,193	2.11	+0.12
Communist Party of Denmark	616	1.09	-0.83
Christian People's Party	569	1.01	+0.25
Socialist Workers Party	45	0.08	0.00
Marxist–Leninists Party	11	0.02	New
Carsten Grøn-Nielsen	5	0.01	New
Mogens Nebelong	3	0.01	0.00
Poul Rasmussen	0	0.00	New
Total	56,445		

1981 Danish general election

Parties	Vote		
Parties	Votes	%	+ / -
Social Democrats	21,550	40.65	-5.75
Green Left	9,127	17.21	+8.23
Conservatives	6,546	12.35	+2.11
Progress Party	3,926	7.41	-1.04
Centre Democrats	3,681	6.94	+4.08
Social Liberals	2,535	4.78	-0.78
Left Socialists	1,924	3.63	-1.92
Venstre	1,116	2.10	-1.19
Justice Party of Denmark	1,055	1.99	-1.91
Communist Party of Denmark	1,018	1.92	-1.44
Christian People's Party	402	0.76	-0.02
Communist Workers Party	88	0.17	-0.46
Socialist Workers Party	44	0.08	New
Mogens Nebelong	6	0.01	New
Total	53,018		

=== General elections in the 1970s ===
1979 Danish general election

Parties	Vote		
Parties	Votes	%	+ / -
Social Democrats	24,858	46.40	+1.04
Conservatives	5,487	10.24	+3.64
Green Left	4,811	8.98	+2.68
Progress Party	4,528	8.45	-3.61
Social Liberals	2,978	5.56	+3.13
Left Socialists	2,974	5.55	+1.57
Justice Party of Denmark	2,091	3.90	-1.09
Communist Party of Denmark	1,799	3.36	-3.17
Venstre	1,761	3.29	+0.24
Centre Democrats	1,534	2.86	-3.87
Christian People's Party	417	0.78	-0.26
Communist Workers Party	337	0.63	New
Total	53,575		

1977 Danish general election

Parties	Vote		
Parties	Votes	%	+ / -
Social Democrats	23,421	45.36	+10.17
Progress Party	6,229	12.06	-1.96
Centre Democrats	3,474	6.73	+4.21
Conservatives	3,408	6.60	+1.86
Communist Party of Denmark	3,369	6.53	-0.98
Green Left	3,251	6.30	-3.41
Justice Party of Denmark	2,575	4.99	+2.65
Left Socialists	2,055	3.98	+1.31
Venstre	1,574	3.05	-9.05
Social Liberals	1,254	2.43	-3.86
Christian People's Party	539	1.04	-1.86
Pensioners' Party	476	0.92	New
Otto Jensen	5	0.01	New
Poul Rasmussen	1	0.00	New
Total	51,631		

1975 Danish general election

Parties	Vote		
Parties	Votes	%	+ / -
Social Democrats	17,693	35.19	+6.38
Progress Party	7,049	14.02	-0.78
Venstre	6,085	12.10	+8.40
Green Left	4,884	9.71	-1.89
Communist Party of Denmark	3,777	7.51	+0.92
Social Liberals	3,161	6.29	-1.90
Conservatives	2,383	4.74	-2.85
Christian People's Party	1,459	2.90	+1.15
Left Socialists	1,343	2.67	+0.48
Centre Democrats	1,266	2.52	-8.73
Justice Party of Denmark	1,174	2.34	-1.17
Henning Glahn	2	0.00	New
J. G. Amdrejcak	1	0.00	New
Kai Clemmensen	1	0.00	New
Poul Friborg	0	0.00	New
Total	50,278		

1973 Danish general election

Parties	Vote		
Parties	Votes	%	+ / -
Social Democrats	13,074	28.81	-13.99
Progress Party	6,716	14.80	New
Green Left	5,262	11.60	-4.63
Centre Democrats	5,103	11.25	New
Social Liberals	3,718	8.19	-4.15
Conservatives	3,445	7.59	-9.33
Communist Party of Denmark	2,992	6.59	+4.16
Venstre	1,680	3.70	-0.70
Justice Party of Denmark	1,593	3.51	+1.80
Left Socialists	993	2.19	-0.01
Christian People's Party	793	1.75	+1.02
Erik Dissing	11	0.02	New
Total	45,380		

1971 Danish general election

Parties	Vote		
Parties	Votes	%	+ / -
Social Democrats	18,347	42.80	+6.73
Conservatives	7,252	16.92	-5.76
Green Left	6,959	16.23	+5.37
Social Liberals	5,291	12.34	-5.05
Venstre	1,887	4.40	+0.11
Communist Party of Denmark	1,042	2.43	+0.51
Left Socialists	943	2.20	-1.87
Justice Party of Denmark	731	1.71	+1.26
Christian People's Party	314	0.73	New
Henning Berthelsen	103	0.24	New
Total	42,869		

=== General elections in the 1960s ===
1968 Danish general election

Parties	Vote		
Parties	Votes	%	+ / -
Social Democrats	15,488	36.07	+1.56
Conservatives	9,736	22.68	-7.96
Social Liberals	7,468	17.39	+11.16
Green Left	4,664	10.86	-6.55
Venstre	1,842	4.29	-0.73
Left Socialists	1,747	4.07	New
Liberal Centre	878	2.04	-2.00
Communist Party of Denmark	823	1.92	+0.68
Justice Party of Denmark	194	0.45	+0.12
Independent Party	95	0.22	-0.36
H. Søndersted Andersen	4	0.01	New
Kirsten Lonning	4	0.01	New
Thode Karlsen	1	0.00	-0.01
Total	42,935		

1966 Danish general election

Parties	Vote		
Parties	Votes	%	+ / -
Social Democrats	16,298	34.51	-11.11
Conservatives	14,471	30.64	+5.62
Green Left	8,224	17.41	+7.04
Social Liberals	2,941	6.23	+2.00
Venstre	2,370	5.02	-4.15
Liberal Centre	1,908	4.04	New
Communist Party of Denmark	585	1.24	-0.95
Independent Party	275	0.58	-1.11
Justice Party of Denmark	157	0.33	-0.60
Thode Karlsen	3	0.01	New
Total	47,232		

1964 Danish general election

Parties	Vote		
Parties	Votes	%	+ / -
Social Democrats	28,115	45.62	-1.83
Conservatives	15,418	25.02	+2.53
Green Left	6,389	10.37	-1.26
Venstre	5,650	9.17	+1.19
Social Liberals	2,608	4.23	-0.36
Communist Party of Denmark	1,347	2.19	+0.26
Independent Party	1,043	1.69	-0.49
Justice Party of Denmark	574	0.93	-0.81
Peace Politics People's Party	269	0.44	New
Danish Unity	190	0.31	New
Elin Høgsbro Appel	29	0.05	New
Total	61,632		

1960 Danish general election

Parties	Vote		
Parties	Votes	%	+ / -
Social Democrats	24,521	47.45	+1.39
Conservatives	11,625	22.49	+1.20
Green Left	6,012	11.63	New
Venstre	4,124	7.98	-2.92
Social Liberals	2,373	4.59	-3.49
Independent Party	1,129	2.18	+0.66
Communist Party of Denmark	999	1.93	-4.29
Justice Party of Denmark	900	1.74	-4.19
Total	51,683		

=== General elections in the 1950s ===
1957 Danish general election

Parties	Vote		
Parties	Votes	%	+ / -
Social Democrats	18,029	46.06	-2.94
Conservatives	8,332	21.29	+0.75
Venstre	4,268	10.90	+3.71
Social Liberals	3,164	8.08	-0.11
Communist Party of Denmark	2,436	6.22	-3.16
Justice Party of Denmark	2,320	5.93	+1.88
Independent Party	595	1.52	-0.12
Total	39,144		

September 1953 Danish Folketing election

Parties	Vote		
Parties	Votes	%	+ / -
Social Democrats	13,976	49.00	
Conservatives	5,860	20.54	
Communist Party of Denmark	2,676	9.38	
Social Liberals	2,335	8.19	
Venstre	2,051	7.19	
Justice Party of Denmark	1,156	4.05	
Independent Party	469	1.64	
Total	28,523		

== European Parliament elections results ==
2024 European Parliament election in Denmark

Parties	Vote		
Parties	Votes	%	+ / -
Green Left	4,149	21.73	+5.44
Social Democrats	3,635	19.04	-5.39
Red–Green Alliance	1,727	9.05	+1.90
Conservatives	1,641	8.60	+3.51
Venstre	1,613	8.45	-5.24
Danish People's Party	1,600	8.38	-4.64
Social Liberals	1,335	6.99	-3.84
Moderates	1,124	5.89	New
Liberal Alliance	1,033	5.41	+4.08
Denmark Democrats	717	3.76	New
The Alternative	516	2.70	-0.45
Total	19,090		

2019 European Parliament election in Denmark

Parties	Vote		
Parties	Votes	%	+ / -
Social Democrats	5,572	24.43	+2.10
Green Left	3,716	16.29	+5.05
Venstre	3,123	13.69	+4.72
Danish People's Party	2,971	13.02	-21.14
Social Liberals	2,470	10.83	+5.71
Red–Green Alliance	1,631	7.15	New
Conservatives	1,161	5.09	-1.25
People's Movement against the EU	1,145	5.02	-4.72
The Alternative	719	3.15	New
Liberal Alliance	303	1.33	-0.77
Total	22,811		

2014 European Parliament election in Denmark

Parties	Vote		
Parties	Votes	%	+ / -
Danish People's Party	6,587	34.16	+12.47
Social Democrats	4,305	22.33	-1.73
Green Left	2,167	11.24	-5.73
People's Movement against the EU	1,879	9.74	-1.64
Venstre	1,729	8.97	-3.06
Conservatives	1,223	6.34	-1.08
Social Liberals	987	5.12	+1.74
Liberal Alliance	405	2.10	+1.55
Total	19,282		

2009 European Parliament election in Denmark

Parties	Vote		
Parties	Votes	%	+ / -
Social Democrats	4,719	24.06	-14.91
Danish People's Party	4,253	21.69	+11.55
Green Left	3,327	16.97	+8.36
Venstre	2,359	12.03	+2.26
People's Movement against the EU	2,232	11.38	+2.68
Conservatives	1,456	7.42	-1.45
Social Liberals	663	3.38	-0.93
June Movement	494	2.52	-7.43
Liberal Alliance	107	0.55	New
Total	19,610		

2004 European Parliament election in Denmark

Parties	Vote		
Parties	Votes	%	+ / -
Social Democrats	10,319	38.97	+20.13
Danish People's Party	2,685	10.14	+0.59
June Movement	2,634	9.95	-10.22
Venstre	2,588	9.77	-3.27
Conservatives	2,348	8.87	+2.40
People's Movement against the EU	2,303	8.70	-1.96
Green Left	2,280	8.61	-0.32
Social Liberals	1,140	4.31	-3.56
Christian Democrats	182	0.69	-0.55
Total	26,479		

1999 European Parliament election in Denmark

Parties	Vote		
Parties	Votes	%	+ / -
June Movement	5,698	20.17	-0.25
Social Democrats	5,321	18.84	-0.92
Venstre	3,684	13.04	+3.91
People's Movement against the EU	3,010	10.66	-4.52
Danish People's Party	2,696	9.55	New
Green Left	2,523	8.93	-0.80
Social Liberals	2,224	7.87	-0.03
Conservatives	1,827	6.47	-7.21
Centre Democrats	911	3.23	+2.25
Christian Democrats	350	1.24	+0.80
Progress Party	131	0.46	-2.32
Total	28,244		

1994 European Parliament election in Denmark

Parties	Vote		
Parties	Votes	%	+ / -
June Movement	6,377	20.42	New
Social Democrats	6,169	19.76	-8.71
People's Movement against the EU	4,739	15.18	-14.68
Conservatives	4,271	13.68	+4.19
Green Left	3,037	9.73	-2.97
Venstre	2,851	9.13	+2.89
Social Liberals	2,465	7.90	+6.05
Progress Party	868	2.78	-1.18
Centre Democrats	307	0.98	-5.33
Christian Democrats	138	0.44	-0.68
Total	31,222		

1989 European Parliament election in Denmark

Parties	Vote		
Parties	Votes	%	+ / -
People's Movement against the EU	8,551	29.86	-1.22
Social Democrats	8,155	28.47	+5.55
Green Left	3,638	12.70	-3.03
Conservatives	2,717	9.49	-5.52
Centre Democrats	1,808	6.31	+1.08
Venstre	1,787	6.24	+3.95
Progress Party	1,134	3.96	+0.73
Social Liberals	529	1.85	-0.22
Christian Democrats	321	1.12	+0.01
Total	28,640		

1984 European Parliament election in Denmark

Parties	Vote	
Parties	Votes	%
People's Movement against the EU	10,172	31.08
Social Democrats	7,501	22.92
Green Left	5,148	15.73
Conservatives	4,911	15.01
Centre Democrats	1,710	5.23
Progress Party	1,058	3.23
Venstre	749	2.29
Social Liberals	677	2.07
Left Socialists	438	1.34
Christian Democrats	363	1.11
Total	32,727	

== Referendums ==
2022 Danish European Union opt-out referendum

Option	Votes	%
✓ YES	14,015	62.92
X NO	8,260	37.08

2015 Danish European Union opt-out referendum

Option	Votes	%
X NO	15,391	60.86
✓ YES	9,897	39.14

2014 Danish Unified Patent Court membership referendum

Option	Votes	%
✓ YES	10,211	54.21
X NO	8,625	45.79

2009 Danish Act of Succession referendum

Option	Votes	%
✓ YES	14,720	82.52
X NO	3,118	17.48

2000 Danish euro referendum

Option	Votes	%
X NO	32,035	61.92
✓ YES	19,705	38.08

1998 Danish Amsterdam Treaty referendum

Option	Votes	%
X NO	24,886	55.83
✓ YES	19,688	44.17

1993 Danish Maastricht Treaty referendum

Option	Votes	%
X NO	28,725	53.83
✓ YES	24,638	46.17

1992 Danish Maastricht Treaty referendum

Option	Votes	%
X NO	31,702	60.92
✓ YES	20,333	39.08

1986 Danish Single European Act referendum

Option	Votes	%
X NO	29,977	62.57
✓ YES	17,930	37.43

1972 Danish European Communities membership referendum

Option	Votes	%
✓ YES	23,169	50.14
X NO	23,041	49.86
