= List of members of the Løgting, 1990–1994 =

The Faroese Løgting had 32 members between the elections of 1990 and 1994.

== Members ==
Name	Party	Area	Remarks
Finnbogi Arge	Sambandsflokkurin	Suðurstreymoy (South Streymoy)	
Thomas Arabo	Javnaðarflokkurin	Norðurstreymoy (North Streymoy)	Minister 1991–1993. Heini Johansen took his seat.
Óli Breckmann	Fólkaflokkurin	Suðurstreymoy (South Streymoy)	
Signar á Brúnni	Tjóðveldisflokkurin	Eysturoy	Minister 1990–1991 and 1993–1994. Hans Tausen Olsen took his seat 1993–1994.
Atli Dam	Javnaðarflokkurin	Suðurstreymoy (South Streymoy)	Prime Minister 1991–1993. Jóannes Dalsgaard took his seat 1991–1992, Svenning Winther 1992–1994.
Birgir Danielsen	Fólkaflokkurin	Suðurstreymoy (South Streymoy)	
Niels Pauli Danielsen	Kristiligi Fólkaflokkurin	Norðoyar	
Frank Davidsen	Javnaðarflokkurin	Vágar	
Terje Davidsen	Sambandsflokkurin	Norðurstreymoy (North Streymoy)	
Jóannes Eidesgaard	Javnaðarflokkurin	Suðuroy	Minister 1991–1994. Mikkjal Sørensen took his seat.
Svend Aage Ellefsen	Fólkaflokkurin	Vágar	Minister 1991–1993. Jørgen Niclasen took his seat.
Heini O. Heinesen	Tjóðveldisflokkurin	Norðoyar	
Finnbogi Ísakson	Tjóðveldisflokkurin	Suðurstreymoy (South Streymoy)	
Asbjørn Joensen	Sjálvstýrisflokkurin	Norðoyar	Died in 1993 Karl Heri Joensen took his seat 1993–1994.
Edmund Joensen	Sambandsflokkurin	Eysturoy	
Vilhelm Johannesen	Javnaðarflokkurin	Norðoyar	
Jógvan A. Johannessen	Javnaðarflokkurin	Sandoy	
Anfinn Kallsberg	Fólkaflokkurin	Norðoyar	Speaker of the Løgting 1991–1993.
Lasse Klein	Sjálvstýrisflokkurin	Eysturoy	Speaker of the Løgting 1993–1994.
Sverre Midjord	Javnaðarflokkurin	Suðuroy	
Flemming Mikkelsen	Sambandsflokkurin	Suðuroy	
Helena Dam á Neystabø	Sjálvstýrisflokkurin	Suðurstreymoy (South Streymoy)	
Tordur Niclasen	Kristiligi Fólkaflokkurin	Eysturoy	
Hergeir Nielsen	Tjóðveldisflokkurin	Suðuroy	
Henrik Old	Javnaðarflokkurin	Suðuroy	
Jógvan I. Olsen	Sambandsflokkurin	Eysturoy	Minister 1990–1991. Jákup Lamhauge took his seat.
Olaf Olsen	Fólkaflokkurin	Eysturoy	Minister 1990–1991.
John Petersen	Fólkaflokkurin	Sandoy	Minister 1991–1993. Eyðun M. Viderø took his seat.
Lisbeth L. Petersen	Sambandsflokkurin	Suðurstreymoy (South Streymoy)	
Marita Petersen	Javnaðarflokkurin	Suðurstreymoy (South Streymoy)	Minister 1991–1993, Prime Minister 1993–1994. Jacob Lindenskov took her seat 1992–1994.
Jógvan Sundstein	Fólkaflokkurin	Suðurstreymoy (South Streymoy)	Prime Minister 1990–1991, minister 1991–1993. Bjarni Djurholm took his seat.
Jørgen Thomsen	Javnaðarflokkurin	Eysturoy	Speaker of the Løgting 1990–1991.
