= 1984 Faroese general election =

← 1980	8 November 1984	1988 →
Party	Leader	Vote %	Seats	+/–
Social Democratic	Atli Dam	23.35	8	+1
People's	Jógvan Sundstein	21.63	7	+1
Union	Pauli Ellefsen	21.17	7	−1
Republic	Signar Hansen	19.55	6	0
Self-Government	Hilmar Kass	8.48	2	−1
Christian People's	Kjartan Mohr	5.82	2	0
This lists parties that won seats. See the complete results below.
Prime Minister before	Prime Minister after
Pauli Ellefsen; Union	Atli Dam; Social Democratic

Parliamentary elections were held in the Faroe Islands on 8 November 1984. They were won by the Social Democratic Party, whose leader Atli Dam became Prime Minister.

== Results ==
Party	Votes	%	Seats	+/–
Social Democratic Party	5,879	23.35	8	+1
People's Party	5,446	21.63	7	+1
Union Party	5,330	21.17	7	–1
Republican Party	4,921	19.55	6	0
Self-Government Party	2,135	8.48	2	–1
Christian People's Party	1,466	5.82	2	0
Total	25,177	100.00	32	0
Registered voters/turnout		86.8		
Source: Árbók fyri Føroyar 2003
