= 1958 Faroese general election =

Danish territorial election

- 8 November 1958
| Party | Leader | Vote % | Seats | +/– |
|---|---|---|---|---|
| Social Democratic | Peter Mohr Dam | 25.84 | 8 | +3 |
| Republic | Erlendur Patursson | 23.93 | 7 | +1 |
| Union | Johan Poulsen | 23.68 | 7 | 0 |
| People's | Hákun Djurhuus | 17.76 | 5 | −1 |
| Self-Government | Louis Zachariasen | 5.88 | 2 | 0 |
| Progress | Kjartan Mohr | 2.91 | 1 | New |
This lists parties that won seats. See the complete results below.
| Prime Minister before | Prime Minister after |
|---|---|
| Kristian Djurhuus; Union | Peter Mohr Dam; Social Democratic |

General elections were held in the Faroe Islands on 8 November 1958. The Social Democratic Party emerged as the largest party in the Løgting, winning 8 of the 30 seats.

== Results ==
| Party | Votes | % | Seats | +/– |
|---|---|---|---|---|
| Social Democratic Party | 3,589 | 25.84 | 8 | +3 |
| Republican Party | 3,323 | 23.93 | 7 | +1 |
| Union Party | 3,288 | 23.68 | 7 | 0 |
| People's Party | 2,467 | 17.76 | 5 | –1 |
| Self-Government Party | 816 | 5.88 | 2 | 0 |
| Progress Party | 404 | 2.91 | 1 | New |
| Total | 13,887 | 100.00 | 30 | +3 |
Source: Election Passport (votes)
