= 1962 Faroese general election =

Danish territorial election

- 8 November 1962
Party	Leader	Vote %	Seats	+/–
Social Democratic	Peter Mohr Dam	27.45	8	0
Republic	Erlendur Patursson	21.65	6	−1
Union	Johan Poulsen	20.33	6	−1
People's	Hákun Djurhuus	20.24	6	+1
Self-Government	Niels Poulsen	5.88	2	0
Progress	Kjartan Mohr	4.45	1	0
This lists parties that won seats. See the complete results below.
Prime Minister before	Prime Minister after
Peter Mohr Dam; Social Democratic	Hákun Djurhuus; People's

General elections were held in the Faroe Islands on 8 November 1962. The Social Democratic Party emerged as the largest party in the Løgting, winning 8 of the 29 seats.

== Results ==
Party	Votes	%	Seats	+/–
Social Democratic Party	4,161	27.45	8	0
Republican Party	3,281	21.65	6	–1
Union Party	3,082	20.33	6	–1
People's Party	3,068	20.24	6	+1
Self-Government Party	892	5.88	2	0
Progress Party	674	4.45	1	0
Total	15,158	100.00	29	–1
Source: Election Passport (votes)
