= 1966 Faroese general election =

Danish territorial election

- 8 November 1966
Party	Leader	Vote %	Seats	+/–
Social Democratic	Peter Mohr Dam	26.96	7	−1
Union	Johan Poulsen	23.70	6	0
People's	Hákun Djurhuus	21.62	6	0
Republic	Erlendur Patursson	20.02	5	−1
Self-Government	Niels Poulsen	4.92	1	−1
Progress	Kjartan Mohr	2.77	1	0
This lists parties that won seats. See the complete results below.
Prime Minister before	Prime Minister after
Hákun Djurhuus; People's	Peter Mohr Dam; Social Democratic

General elections were held in the Faroe Islands on 8 November 1966. The Social Democratic Party emerged as the largest party in the Løgting, winning 7 of the 26 seats.

== Results ==
Party	Votes	%	Seats	+/–
Social Democratic Party	4,751	26.96	7	–1
Union Party	4,177	23.70	6	0
People's Party	3,811	21.62	6	0
Republican Party	3,529	20.02	5	–1
Self-Government Party	867	4.92	1	–1
Progress Party	489	2.77	1	0
Total	17,624	100.00	26	–3
Source: Election Passport (votes)
