= 1978 Faroese general election =

- 7 November 1978
Party	Leader	Vote %	Seats	+/–
Union	Pauli Ellefsen	26.25	8	+3
Social Democratic	Atli Dam	22.28	8	+1
Republic	Signar Hansen	20.30	6	0
People's	Hákun Djurhuus	17.90	6	+1
Self-Government Party	Hilmar Kass	7.16	2	0
Progress and Fisheries	Kjartan Mohr	6.11	2	+1
This lists parties that won seats. See the complete results below.
Prime Minister before	Prime Minister after
Atli Dam; Social Democratic	Atli Dam; Social Democratic

General elections were held in the Faroe Islands on 7 November 1978. The Social Democratic Party and the Union Party emerged as the largest parties, each winning eight of the 32 seats in the Løgting. Two of the 32 elected members were women, and this was the first time ever that women were elected members of the Løgting. The women were Karin Kjølbro (Republican Party) and Jona Henriksen (Social Democratic Party), both from South Streymoy.

== Results ==
Party	Votes	%	Seats	+/–
Union Party	5,966	26.25	8	+3
Social Democratic Party	5,062	22.28	8	+1
Republican Party	4,614	20.30	6	0
People's Party	4,067	17.90	6	+1
Self-Government Party	1,626	7.16	2	0
Progress and Fisheries Party	1,389	6.11	2	+1
Total	22,724	100.00	32	+6
Source: Election Passport (votes)
