= 1974 Faroese general election =

Danish territorial election

- 7 November 1974
Party	Leader	Vote %	Seats	+/–
Social Democratic	Atli Dam	25.81	7	0
Republic	Signar Hansen	22.46	6	0
People's	Hákun Djurhuus	20.49	5	0
Union	Pauli Ellefsen	19.13	5	−1
Self-Government	Hilmar Kass	7.20	2	+1
Progress	Kjartan Mohr	2.45	1	0
This lists parties that won seats. See the complete results below.
Prime Minister before	Prime Minister after
Atli Dam; Social Democratic	Atli Dam; Social Democratic

General elections were held in the Faroe Islands on 7 November 1974. The Social Democratic Party emerged as the largest party in the Løgting, winning 7 of the 26 seats.

== Results ==
Party	Votes	%	Seats	+/–
Social Democratic Party	5,125	25.81	7	0
Republican Party	4,461	22.46	6	0
People's Party	4,069	20.49	5	0
Union Party	3,799	19.13	5	–1
Self-Government Party	1,430	7.20	2	+1
Progress Party	487	2.45	1	0
Independents	488	2.46	0	New
Total	19,859	100.00	26	0
Source: Election Passport (votes)
