= 1980 Faroese general election =

Danish territorial election

- 8 November 1980
Party	Leader	Vote %	Seats	+/–
Union	Pauli Ellefsen	23.9%	8	0
Social Democratic	Atli Dam	21.7%	7	−1
Republic	Signar Hansen	19.0%	6	0
People's	Jógvan Sundstein	18.9%	6	0
Self-Government	Hilmar Kass	8.4%	3	+1
Progress and Fisheries	Kjartan Mohr	8.2%	2	0
This lists parties that won seats. See the complete results below.
Prime Minister before	Prime Minister after
Atli Dam; Social Democratic	Pauli Ellefsen; Union

General elections were held in the Faroe Islands on 8 November 1980. The Union Party emerged as the largest party in the Løgting, winning eight of the 32 seats.

== Results ==
Party	Votes	%	Seats	+/–
Union Party	5,557	23.88	8	0
Social Democratic Party	5,043	21.67	7	–1
Republican Party	4,415	18.97	6	0
People's Party	4,399	18.90	6	0
Self-Government Party	1,953	8.39	3	+1
Progress and Fisheries Party	1,905	8.19	2	0
Total	23,272	100.00	32	0
Registered voters/turnout		85.9		
Source: Árbók fyri Føroyar 2003
