= 1988 Faroese general election =

Danish territorial election

- 17 November 1988
| Party | Leader | Vote % | Seats | +/– |
|---|---|---|---|---|
| People's | Jógvan Sundstein | 23.23 | 8 | +1 |
| Social Democratic | Atli Dam | 21.64 | 7 | −1 |
| Union | Pauli Ellefsen | 21.23 | 7 | 0 |
| Republic | Signar Hansen | 19.16 | 6 | 0 |
| Self-Government Party | Hilmar Kass | 7.06 | 2 | 0 |
| Christian People's | Tordur Niclasen | 5.49 | 2 | 0 |
This lists parties that won seats. See the complete results below.
| Prime Minister before | Prime Minister after |
|---|---|
| Atli Dam; Social Democratic | Jógvan Sundstein; People's |

Parliamentary elections were held in the Faroe Islands on 17 November 1988.

== Results ==
| Party | Votes | % | Seats | +/– |
|---|---|---|---|---|
| People's Party | 6,692 | 23.23 | 8 | +1 |
| Social Democratic Party | 6,233 | 21.64 | 7 | –1 |
| Union Party | 6,116 | 21.23 | 7 | 0 |
| Republican Party | 5,520 | 19.16 | 6 | 0 |
| Self-Government Party | 2,033 | 7.06 | 2 | 0 |
| Christian People's Party | 1,582 | 5.49 | 2 | 0 |
| Progress Party | 617 | 2.14 | 0 | New |
| Independents | 13 | 0.05 | 0 | New |
| Total | 28,806 | 100.00 | 32 | 0 |
| Registered voters/turnout | | 87.2 | | |
Source: Árbók fyri Føroyar 2003
