= 1970 Faroese general election =

Danish territorial election

- 7 November 1970
Party	Leader	Vote %	Seats	+/–
Social Democratic	J. F. Øregaard	27.21	7	0
Republic	Erlendur Patursson	21.94	6	+1
Union	Trygve Samuelsen	21.71	6	0
People's	Hákun Djurhuus	20.02	5	−1
Self-Government	Niels Poulsen	5.59	1	0
Progress	Kjartan Mohr	3.53	1	0
This lists parties that won seats. See the complete results below.
Prime Minister before	Prime Minister after
Kristian Djurhuus; Union	Atli Dam; Social Democratic

General elections were held in the Faroe Islands on 7 November 1970. The Social Democratic Party emerged as the largest party in the Løgting, winning 7 of the 26 seats.

== Results ==
Party	Votes	%	Seats	+/–
Social Democratic Party	4,916	27.21	7	0
Republican Party	3,963	21.94	6	+1
Union Party	3,921	21.71	6	0
People's Party	3,617	20.02	5	–1
Self-Government Party	1,010	5.59	1	0
Progress Party	637	3.53	1	0
Total	18,064	100.00	26	0
Source: Election Passport
