= Youth of the Left Socialists =

Youth wing of the Danish political party Left Socialists

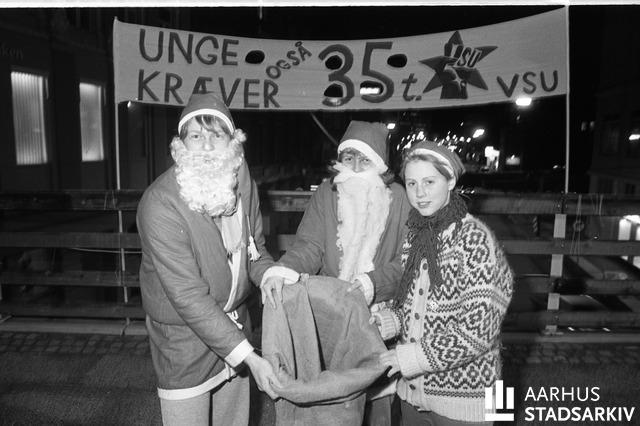
VSU members in December 1986

Venstresocialisternes Ungdom (Youth of the Left Socialists) was the youth wing of the Danish political party Venstresocialisterne (Left Socialists). VSU was founded at a conference 4–5 February 1984.

VSU was dissolved in 1992. Members of VSU were active in the establishment of the new youth organization REBEL the very same year.
