= 1865 Faroese general election =

Danish territorial election

Partial general elections were held in the Faroe Islands in 1865 to elect nine of the eighteen elected members of the Løgting. The Danish administrator (Amtmaður) and the local dean (Próstur) were also members, with the administrator serving as the speaker.

== Electoral system ==
Members of the Løgting were elected by first-past-the-post voting, with voters having as many votes as there were seats available in their constituency. Nine of the 18 seats were elected every two years. Voting was restricted to men aged 25 or over who met certain tax-paying criteria.

== Results ==
Constituency	Elected members	Notes
Norðoyggjar	Absalon Guttormsen	Re-elected
Norðoyggjar	Hans David Matras	Re-elected
Sandoy	Jóannes Dalsgaard	Re-elected
Sandoy	Ole Jacobsen	
Suðuroy	Niels Jacob Joensen	
Suðuroy	Daniel Jákup Mortensen	Re-elected
Suðurstreymoy	Joen Jacobsen	
Suðurstreymoy	Hans Christopher Müller	
Suðurstreymoy	Napoleon Nolsøe	
Source: Løgting
