= 1979 Danish general election =

- 23 October 1979
- All 179 seats in the Folketing; 90 seats needed for a majority
- Turnout: 85.62%
Party	Leader	Vote %	Seats	+/–
Social Democrats	Anker Jørgensen	38.27	68	+3
Venstre	Henning Christophersen	12.50	22	+1
Conservatives	Poul Schlüter	12.48	22	+7
Progress	Mogens Glistrup	11.01	20	−6
SF	Gert Petersen	5.91	11	+4
Social Liberals	Niels Helveg Petersen	5.44	10	+4
Left Socialists	Collective leadership	3.66	6	+1
Centre Democrats	Erhard Jakobsen	3.22	6	−5
Justice	Lars Fredsted Kristensen	2.62	5	−1
KrF	Jens Møller	2.59	5	−1
Elected in the Faroe Islands
Union	Pauli Ellefsen	30.48	1	0
Social Democratic	Atli Dam	23.72	1	0
Elected in Greenland
Atassut	Lars Chemnitz	44.89	1	New
Siumut	Jonathan Motzfeldt	44.07	1	New
This lists parties that won seats. See the complete results below.

Government before	Government after election
Jørgensen III; S–V	Jørgensen IV; Social Democrats

General elections were held in Denmark on 23 October 1979. The Social Democratic Party remained the largest in the Folketing, with 68 of the 179 seats. Voter turnout was 86% in Denmark proper, 65% in the Faroe Islands and 50% in Greenland.

== Results ==
Party	Votes	%	Seats	+/–
Denmark proper
Social Democrats	1,213,456	38.27	68	+3
Venstre	396,484	12.50	22	+1
Conservative People's Party	395,653	12.48	22	+7
Progress Party	349,243	11.01	20	–6
Socialist People's Party	187,284	5.91	11	+4
Danish Social Liberal Party	172,365	5.44	10	+4
Left Socialists	116,047	3.66	6	+1
Centre Democrats	102,132	3.22	6	–5
Justice Party of Denmark	83,238	2.62	5	–1
Christian People's Party	82,133	2.59	5	–1
Communist Party of Denmark	58,901	1.86	0	–7
Communist Workers Party	13,070	0.41	0	New
Independents	996	0.03	0	0
Total	3,171,002	100.00	175	0
Valid votes	3,171,002	99.27		
Invalid/blank votes	23,343	0.73		
Total votes	3,194,345	100.00		
Registered voters/turnout	3,730,650	85.62		
Faroe Islands
Union Party	5,700	30.48	1	0
Social Democratic Party	4,435	23.72	1	0
Republican Party	3,886	20.78	0	0
People's Party	3,005	16.07	0	0
Progress and Fisheries Party	878	4.69	0	New
Self-Government	797	4.26	0	New
Total	18,701	100.00	2	0
Valid votes	18,701	99.57		
Invalid/blank votes	80	0.43		
Total votes	18,781	100.00		
Registered voters/turnout	28,702	65.43		
Greenland
Atassut	6,390	44.89	1	New
Siumut	6,273	44.07	1	New
Labour Party	1,572	11.04	0	New
Total	14,235	100.00	2	0
Valid votes	14,235	93.70		
Invalid/blank votes	957	6.30		
Total votes	15,192	100.00		
Registered voters/turnout	30,191	50.32		
Source: Nohlen & Stöver, Danmarks Statistik
