= 1981 Danish general election =

- 8 December 1981
- All 179 seats in the Folketing; 90 seats needed for a majority
- Turnout: 83.26%
Party	Leader	Vote %	Seats	+/–
Social Democrats	Anker Jørgensen	32.87	59	−9
Conservatives	Poul Schlüter	14.45	26	+4
SF	Gert Petersen	11.31	21	+10
Venstre	Henning Christophersen	11.31	20	−2
Progress	Mogens Glistrup	8.91	16	−4
Centre Democrats	Erhard Jakobsen	8.28	15	+9
Social Liberals	Niels Helveg Petersen	5.12	9	−1
Left Socialists	Collective leadership	2.65	5	−1
KrF	Christian Christensen	2.31	4	−1
Elected in the Faroe Islands
Union	Pauli Ellefsen	26.44	1	0
Social Democratic	Atli Dam	24.49	1	0
Elected in Greenland
Atassut	Lars Chemnitz	48.86	1	0
Siumut	Jonathan Motzfeldt	37.75	1	0
This lists parties that won seats. See the complete results below.

Government before	Government after election
Jørgensen IV; Social Democrats	Jørgensen V Social Democrats

General elections were held in Denmark on 8 December 1981. The election was followed by a two-week crisis over the formation of a new government before the Social Democratic Party resumed its minority government.

The Social Democratic Party lost several seats but remained the largest party in the Folketing, with 59 of the 179 seats.

Voter turnout was 83% in Denmark proper, 55% in the Faroe Islands and 61% in Greenland.

== Results ==
Party	Votes	%	Seats	+/–
Denmark proper
Social Democrats	1,026,726	32.87	59	–9
Conservative People's Party	451,478	14.45	26	+4
Socialist People's Party	353,373	11.31	21	+10
Venstre	353,280	11.31	20	–2
Progress Party	278,383	8.91	16	–4
Centre Democrats	258,522	8.28	15	+9
Danish Social Liberal Party	160,053	5.12	9	–1
Left Socialists	82,711	2.65	5	–1
Christian People's Party	72,174	2.31	4	–1
Justice Party of Denmark	45,174	1.45	0	–5
Communist Party of Denmark	34,625	1.11	0	0
Communist Workers Party	4,223	0.14	0	0
Socialist Workers Party	2,034	0.07	0	New
Independents	807	0.03	0	0
Total	3,123,563	100.00	175	0
Valid votes	3,123,563	99.37		
Invalid/blank votes	19,881	0.63		
Total votes	3,143,444	100.00		
Registered voters/turnout	3,775,333	83.26		
Faroe Islands
Union Party	4,393	26.44	1	0
Social Democratic Party	4,070	24.49	1	0
Republican Party	3,441	20.71	0	0
People's Party	3,073	18.49	0	0
Self-Government	867	5.22	0	0
Progress and Fisheries Party	773	4.65	0	0
Total	16,617	100.00	2	0
Valid votes	16,617	99.53		
Invalid/blank votes	79	0.47		
Total votes	16,696	100.00		
Registered voters/turnout	30,127	55.42		
Greenland
Atassut	9,223	48.86	1	0
Siumut	7,126	37.75	1	0
Independents	2,529	13.40	0	New
Total	18,878	100.00	2	0
Valid votes	18,878	95.33		
Invalid/blank votes	925	4.67		
Total votes	19,803	100.00		
Registered voters/turnout	32,466	61.00		
Source: Nohlen & Stöver
