= 1854 Faroese general election =

Danish territorial election

Partial general elections were held in the Faroe Islands in 1854 to elect eight of the 16 elected members of the Løgting. The Danish administrator (Amtmaður) and the local dean (Próstur) were also members, with the administrator serving as speaker.

== Results ==
Constituency	Elected members	Notes
Eysturoy	Andreas Djurhuus	
Eysturoy	Johannes Petersen	
Eysturoy	Niels Winther	Re-elected
Sandoy	Jacob Jacobsen	
Sandoy	Hans Jacob Jørgen Sørensen	Re-elected
Suðurstreymoy	Andreas Djurhuus	Re-elected
Suðurstreymoy	Andreas Christian Lützen	
Suðurstreymoy	Jens Wenningstedt	
Source: Løgting
