= 1990 Faroese general election =

Danish territorial election

- 17 November 1990
Party	Leader	Vote %	Seats	+/–
Social Democratic	Atli Dam	27.46	10	+3
People's	Jógvan Sundstein	21.94	7	−1
Union	Edmund Joensen	18.88	6	−1
Republic	Signar Hansen	14.70	4	−2
Self-Government	Hilmar Kass	8.76	3	+1
Christian People's	Niels Pauli Danielsen	5.91	2	0
This lists parties that won seats. See the complete results below.
Prime Minister before	Prime Minister after
Jógvan Sundstein; People's	Atli Dam; Social Democratic

Parliamentary elections were held in the Faroe Islands on 17 November 1990.

== Results ==
Party	Votes	%	Seats	+/–
Social Democratic Party	7,805	27.46	10	+3
People's Party	6,234	21.94	7	–1
Union Party	5,367	18.88	6	–1
Republican Party	4,178	14.70	4	–2
Self-Government Party	2,489	8.76	3	+1
Christian People's Party	1,681	5.91	2	0
Social Separatist Party	666	2.34	0	New
Total	28,420	100.00	32	0
Valid votes	28,420	98.27		
Invalid/blank votes	501	1.73		
Total votes	28,921	100.00		
Registered voters/turnout	33,044	87.52		
Source: Árbók fyri Føroyar 2003
