= 1957 Danish general election =

- 14 May 1957
- All 179 seats in the Folketing; 90 seats needed for a majority
- Turnout: 83.73%
Party	Leader	Vote %	Seats	+/–
Social Democrats	H. C. Hansen	39.40	70	−4
Venstre	Erik Eriksen	25.06	45	+3
Conservatives	Aksel Møller	16.62	30	0
Social Liberals	Jørgen Jørgensen	7.78	14	0
Justice	Helge Madsen	5.31	9	+3
Communists	Aksel Larsen	3.13	6	−2
Schleswig Party		0.40	1	0
Elected in the Faroe Islands
People's	Hákun Djurhuus	37.56	1	New
Union	Johan Poulsen	33.80	1	+1
Elected in Greenland
Independents	–	100	2	0
This lists parties that won seats. See the complete results below.
Government before	Government after election
Hansen I Social Democrats	Hansen II; S–R–DR

General elections were held in Denmark on 14 May 1957. The Social Democratic Party remained the largest in the Folketing, with 70 of the 179 seats. Voter turnout was 84% in Denmark proper, 38% in the Faroe Islands and 62% in Greenland (although only one of its two constituencies was contested as the incumbent in the other was re-elected unopposed). The electoral threshold was 60,000 votes.

== Results ==
Party	Votes	%	Seats	+/–
Denmark proper
Social Democrats	910,170	39.40	70	–4
Venstre	578,932	25.06	45	+3
Conservative People's Party	383,843	16.62	30	0
Danish Social Liberal Party	179,822	7.78	14	0
Justice Party of Denmark	122,759	5.31	9	+3
Communist Party of Denmark	72,315	3.13	6	–2
Independent Party	53,061	2.30	0	0
Schleswig Party	9,202	0.40	1	0
Independents	71	0.00	0	New
Total	2,310,175	100.00	175	0
Valid votes	2,310,175	99.53		
Invalid/blank votes	10,922	0.47		
Total votes	2,321,097	100.00		
Registered voters/turnout	2,772,159	83.73		
Faroe Islands
People's Party	2,574	37.56	1	New
Union Party	2,316	33.80	1	0
Social Democratic Party	1,963	28.64	0	–1
Total	6,853	100.00	2	0
Valid votes	6,853	99.20		
Invalid/blank votes	55	0.80		
Total votes	6,908	100.00		
Registered voters/turnout	18,359	37.63		
Greenland
Independents	3,150	100.00	2	0
Total	3,150	100.00	2	0
Valid votes	3,150	98.16		
Invalid/blank votes	59	1.84		
Total votes	3,209	100.00		
Registered voters/turnout	5,193	61.79		
Source: Nohlen & Stöver
