= 1964 Danish general election =

- 22 September 1964
- All 179 seats in the Folketing; 90 seats needed for a majority
- Turnout: 85.51%
Party	Leader	Vote %	Seats	+/–
Social Democrats	Jens Otto Krag	41.94	76	0
Venstre	Erik Eriksen	20.82	38	0
Conservatives	Poul Sørensen	20.06	36	+4
SF	Aksel Larsen	5.76	10	−1
Social Liberals	Karl Skytte	5.31	10	−1
Independents	Iver Poulsen	2.50	5	−1
Elected in the Faroe Islands
Social Democratic	Peter Mohr Dam	39.34	1	0
People's	Hákun Djurhuus	29.70	1	+1
Elected in Greenland
Independents	–	100	2	0
This lists parties that won seats. See the complete results below.
Government before	Government after election
Krag I S–R	Krag II; Social Democrats

General elections were held in Denmark on 22 September 1964. The Social Democratic Party remained the largest in the Folketing, with 76 of the 179 seats. Voter turnout was 86% in Denmark proper, 50% in the Faroe Islands and 49% in Greenland. They were the first elections with the new electoral threshold of 2%.

== Results ==
Party	Votes	%	Seats	+/–
Denmark proper
Social Democrats	1,103,667	41.94	76	0
Venstre	547,770	20.82	38	0
Conservative People's Party	527,798	20.06	36	+4
Socialist People's Party	151,697	5.76	10	–1
Danish Social Liberal Party	139,702	5.31	10	–1
Independent Party	65,756	2.50	5	–1
Justice Party of Denmark	34,258	1.30	0	0
Communist Party of Denmark	32,390	1.23	0	0
Danish Unity	9,747	0.37	0	New
Schleswig Party	9,274	0.35	0	–1
Peace Politics People's Party	9,070	0.34	0	New
Independents	255	0.01	0	0
Total	2,631,384	100.00	175	0
Valid votes	2,631,384	99.64		
Invalid/blank votes	9,472	0.36		
Total votes	2,640,856	100.00		
Registered voters/turnout	3,088,269	85.51		
Faroe Islands
Social Democratic Party	4,133	39.34	1	0
Union Party	3,121	29.70	0	–1
People's Party	2,622	24.95	1	+1
Progress Party	631	6.01	0	New
Total	10,507	100.00	2	0
Valid votes	10,507	99.47		
Invalid/blank votes	56	0.53		
Total votes	10,563	100.00		
Registered voters/turnout	21,040	50.20		
Greenland
Independents	8,332	100.00	2	0
Total	8,332	100.00	2	0
Valid votes	8,332	98.85		
Invalid/blank votes	97	1.15		
Total votes	8,429	100.00		
Registered voters/turnout	17,238	48.90		
Source: Nohlen & Stöver
