= 1968 Danish general election =

- 23 January 1968
- All 179 seats in the Folketing; 90 seats needed for a majority
- Turnout: 89.28%
Party	Leader	Vote %	Seats	+/–
Social Democrats	Jens Otto Krag	34.15	62	−7
Conservatives	Poul Sørensen	20.35	37	+3
Venstre	Poul Hartling	18.57	34	−1
Social Liberals	Hilmar Baunsgaard	14.97	27	+14
SF	Aksel Larsen	6.11	11	−9
Left Socialists	Collective leadership	2.00	4	New
Elected in the Faroe Islands
People's	Hákun Djurhuus	34.42	1	0
Social Democratic	Peter Mohr Dam	32.47	1	0
Elected in Greenland
Independents	–	100	2	0
This lists parties that won seats. See the complete results below.
Government before	Government after election
Krag II; Social Democrats	Baunsgaard; R–K–V

General elections were held in Denmark on 23 January 1968. The Social Democratic Party remained the largest in the Folketing, with 62 of the 179 seats. Voter turnout was 89% in Denmark proper, 57% in the Faroe Islands and 56% in Greenland. They were the last elections in which the old counties were used as constituencies.

== Results ==
Party	Votes	%	Seats	+/–
Denmark proper
Social Democrats	974,833	34.15	62	–7
Conservative People's Party	581,051	20.35	37	+3
Venstre	530,167	18.57	34	–1
Danish Social Liberal Party	427,304	14.97	27	+14
Socialist People's Party	174,553	6.11	11	–9
Left Socialists	57,184	2.00	4	New
Liberal Centre	37,407	1.31	0	–4
Communist Party of Denmark	29,706	1.04	0	0
Justice Party of Denmark	21,124	0.74	0	0
Independent Party	14,360	0.50	0	0
Schleswig Party	6,831	0.24	0	New
Independents	127	0.00	0	0
Total	2,854,647	100.00	175	0
Valid votes	2,854,647	99.65		
Invalid/blank votes	10,158	0.35		
Total votes	2,864,805	100.00		
Registered voters/turnout	3,208,646	89.28		
Faroe Islands
People's Party	4,294	34.42	1	0
Social Democratic Party	4,051	32.47	1	0
Union Party	3,242	25.99	0	0
Progress Party	889	7.13	0	New
Total	12,476	100.00	2	0
Valid votes	12,476	99.68		
Invalid/blank votes	40	0.32		
Total votes	12,516	100.00		
Registered voters/turnout	22,122	56.58		
Greenland
Independents	11,164	100.00	2	0
Total	11,164	100.00	2	0
Valid votes	11,164	95.56		
Invalid/blank votes	519	4.44		
Total votes	11,683	100.00		
Registered voters/turnout	20,766	56.26		
Source: Nohlen & Stöver

== Aftermath ==
Following the elections, the incumbent Krag government resigned and was replaced by a coalition of the right-wing Conservative People's Party, Venstre and the Danish Social Liberal Party.
