= Christian People's Party (Faroe Islands) =

Christian People's Party Kristiligi Fólkaflokkurin
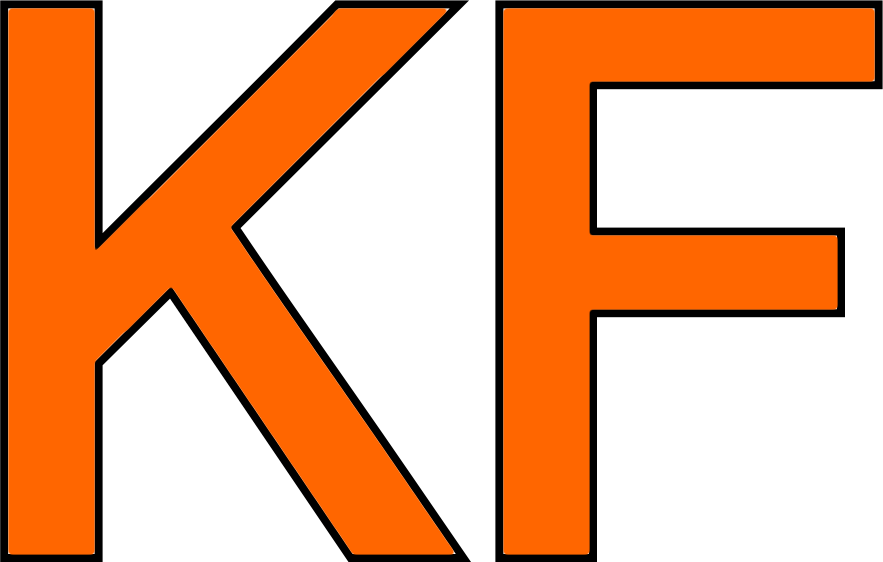
- Leader: Kjartan Mohr (first); Niels Pauli Danielsen (last)
- Founded: 1954
- Dissolved: 2000
- Succeeded by: Centre Party (de facto)
- Ideology: Christian democracy Social conservatism
- Political position: Centre-right to right-wing
- Løgting (1978-1998): 2 / 32

Election symbol
- F

The Christian People's Party, Faroese Progress and Fisheries Party (Faroese: Kristiligi Fólkaflokkurin, Føroya Framburðs- og Fiskivinnuflokkur, KFFFF), generally known as the Christian People's Party (Faroese: Kristiligi Fólkaflokkurin, KF), was a political party in the Faroe Islands.

== History ==
The party was established in 1954 by dissidents from the People's Party, and was originally known as the Progress Party (Framburðsflokkurin). In the 1958 elections it won a single seat in the Løgting, taken by Kjartan Mohr. The party retained its single seat in elections in 1962, 1966, 1970 and 1974, with Mohr remaining its sole MP.

Prior to the 1978 elections it merged with the Fisheries Party to become the Progress and Fisheries Party (Framburðs- og Fiskivinnuflokkurin). The new party won two seats, retaining both in the 1980 elections. In 1984 it adopted its final name, again retaining its two seats in the Løgting in the 1984 elections.

The party won two seats in elections in 1988, 1990 and 1994. However, it lost both seats in the 1998 elections and subsequently folded.

== Election results ==
=== Faroese general elections ===
Election	Votes	%	Seats	+/–
1958	404	2.9	1 / 30	New
1962	674	4.4	1 / 29	Steady
1966	489	2.8	1 / 26	Steady
1970	637	3.5	1 / 26	Steady
1974	487	2.5	1 / 26	Steady
1978	1,389	6.1	2 / 32	▲1
1980	1,905	8.2	2 / 32	Steady
1984	1,466	5.8	2 / 32	Steady
1988	1,582	5.5	2 / 32	Steady
1990	1,681	5.9	2 / 32	Steady
1994	1,606	6.3	2 / 32	Steady
1998	698	2.5	0 / 32	▼2

=== Danish general elections ===
Elections	Votes	% (Faroes)	Seats	Seats (Faroes)	+/–
1964	631	6.0	0 / 179	0 / 2	New
1966	Did not run.				
1968	889	7.1	0 / 179	0 / 2	Steady
1971	362	2.8	0 / 179	0 / 2	Steady
1973	258	2.0	0 / 179	0 / 2	Steady
1975	Did not run.				
1977	207	1.3	0 / 179	0 / 2	Steady
1979	878	4.7	0 / 179	0 / 2	Steady
1981	773	4.7	0 / 179	0 / 2	Steady
1984-1987	Did not run.				
1988	891	3.9	0 / 179	0 / 2	Steady
1990	285	1.6	0 / 179	0 / 2	Steady
1994	467	2.4	0 / 179	0 / 2	Steady
