= Independent Party (Denmark) =

Independent Party De Uafhængige
- Founder: Knud Kristensen
- Founded: 1953
- Headquarters: Gerå Engvej 55; 9340 Asaa
- Ideology: Classical liberalism Anti-elitism
- Political position: Centre-right
- Folketing: 0 / 179

Website
- deuafhaengige.dk

The Independent Party (Danish: De Uafhængige) is a classical liberal and anti-elitist political party in Denmark. It was formed in 1953 as a breakaway party from Venstre as a protest against the established centre-right parties' cooperation with the Social Democrats. The Independent Party later took on an anti-elitist character.

== Election results ==
Folketing 1960, Independent Party (De Uafhængige) (6 seats light purple) in 1960

=== Parliament (Folketing) ===
Date	Votes			Seats	
Date	#	%	± pp	#	±
1953 (Sep)	58,573	2.7%	+2.7	0 / 179	New
1957	53,061	2.3%	-0.4	0 / 179	0
1960	81,134	3.3%	+1.0	6 / 179	▲6
1964	65,756	2.5%	-0.8	5 / 179	▼1
1966	44,994	1.6%	-0.9	0 / 179	▼5
1968	14,360	0.5%	-1.1	0 / 179	0
1971–	Did not run.				

=== Municipal elections ===
Date	Seats	
Date	#	±
2005	0 / 2,522	0
2009–2013	Did not run.	
