= Republic (Faroe Islands) =

Republic Tjóðveldi
- Leader: Sirið Stenberg
- Founders: Erlendur Patursson; Hanus við Høgadalsá; Sigurð Joensen; Jákup í Jákupsstovu
- Founded: 22–23 May 1948
- Headquarters: Postrúm 143, FO-110 Tórshavn
- Youth wing: Unga Tjóðveldið
- Ideology: Democratic socialism; Left-wing nationalism; Faroese independence; Republicanism; Euroscepticism
- Political position: Left-wing
- Nordic affiliation: Nordic Green Left Alliance
- Colours: Grey; Green; Dark green Red; Blue
- Løgting: 6 / 33
- Folketing (Faroe seats): 0 / 2

Election symbol
- E

Website
- www.tjodveldi.fo
- Politics of the Faroe Islands; Political parties; Elections; Formerly; Republican Party; Tjóðveldisflokkurin (1948–2007)

Republic (Faroese: Tjóðveldi [ˈt͡ʃʰɔuːˌvɛltɪ]), formerly known as the Republican Party (Faroese: Tjóðveldisflokkurin) is a pro-independence left-wing political party in the Faroe Islands.

== History ==
The party was founded in 1948 as a reaction to the islands failing to gain independence despite the outcome of the 1946 independence referendum, after which independence was subsequently declared but annulled by the Danish King.

In 1998, Høgni Hoydal succeeded Heini O. Heinesen as party leader.

During the 20 January 2004 legislative elections, the party won 21.7% of the popular vote and eight out of 33 seats. However, after the passing of an amendment adding the term "sexual orientation" to paragraph 266b of the Anti-Discrimination Act, MP Karsten Hansen announced that he was leaving the party owing to a difference in opinion. He later joined the Centre Party.

At the elections on 19 January 2008, the party won 23.3% of the vote and eight out of 33 seats.

On 14 September 2007, the party changed its name from Tjóðveldisflokkurin to simply Tjóðveldi (i.e., from "the Republican Party" to just "Republic").

In the Danish parliamentary elections of 2007, the party received 25.4% of the Faroese vote, thereby retaining one of the two Faroese seats in the Danish national Folketing. In the 2011 election, however, its votes declined and it lost its seat to the Social Democrats. It regained its seat in the 2015 election, then lost it again in the 2019 election. Republic would not re-gain a seat in the Folketing in the 2022 or 2026 elections thereafter, with 2026 seeing its vote percentage reduced to its lowest level since 1994 (though its size in the Faroese Løgting would remain unchanged).

== Leaders ==
Party leaders

- Erlendur Patursson 1948–1971
- Signar Hansen 1971–1994
- Heini O. Heinesen 1994–1998
- Høgni Hoydal 2000–2024
- Sirið Stenberg 2024–present

Parliamentarian leaders

- Signar Hansen 1986–1989
- Heini O. Heinesen 1994–2004
- Høgni Hoydal 2004–2008
- Annita á Fríðriksmørk 2008
- Bergtóra Høgnadóttir Joensen 2008
- Sjúrður Skaale 2008–2009
- Annita á Fríðriksmørk 2009–2011
- Høgni Hoydal 2011–present

== Current members of the Løgting ==
As of the 2022 general snap election:

Name	Elected (E), Re-elected (R), or Appointed (A)	Votes obtained in the general election	Title
Høgni Hoydal	R	760	Deputy Prime Minister, Minister of Foreign Affairs, & Minister of Trade and Industry
Bjørt Samuelsen	R	759	Speaker of the Logting
Sirið Stenberg	R	457	Minister of Social Affairs and Culture
Hervør Pálsdóttir	R	376	Member of the Logting
Annika Olsen^{a}	E	335	Member of the Logting
Dennis Holm	E	305	Minister of Fisheries
Eirikur í Jákupsstovu	A	295	Substitute Member of the Logting
Liljan Weihe	A	290	Substitute Member of the Logting
Erling Eidesgaard	A	216	Substitute Member of the Logting

a. Formerly a member of the People's Party until mid-November 2022.

== Election results ==
Faroese general election

Year	Votes		Seats		Position
Year	#	%	#	±	Position
1950	1,145	9.8	2 / 25	New	▲4th
1954	3,028	23.8	6 / 27	▲4	▲2nd
1958	3,323	23.9	7 / 30	▲1	2nd
1962	3,281	21.6	6 / 29	▼1	2nd
1966	3,529	20.0	5 / 26	▼1	▼4th
1970	3,963	21.9	6 / 26	▲1	▲2nd
1974	4,461	22.5	6 / 26	0	▲2nd
1978	4,614	20.3	6 / 32	0	▼3rd
1980	4,415	19.0	6 / 32	0	3rd
1984	4,921	19.5	6 / 32	0	▼4th
1988	5,520	19.2	6 / 32	0	4th
1990	4,178	14.7	4 / 32	▼2	4th
1994	3,501	13.7	4 / 32	0	4th
1998	6,584	23.8	8 / 32	▲4	▲1st
2002	7,229	23.7	8 / 32	0	▼2nd
2004	6,890	21.7	8 / 32	0	▼3rd
2008	7,238	23.3	8 / 33	0	▲1st
2011	5,584	18.3	6 / 33	▼2	▼3rd
2015	6,681	20.7	7 / 33	▲1	▲2nd
2019	6,127	18.1	6 / 33	▼1	▼4th
2022	6,057	17.7	6 / 33	0	4th
2026	6,143	17.39	6 / 33	0	4th

Danish general election

Year	Votes		Members
Year	#	%	Members
1973	3,312		1 / 2
1975	3,563		1 / 2
1977	3,057		0 / 2
1979	3,886	20.8	0 / 2
1981	3,441	20.7	0 / 2
1984	3,646	19.9	0 / 2
1987	3,478	15.7	0 / 2
1988	4,690	20.5	0 / 2
1990	2,377	13.3	0 / 2
1994	1,798	9.4	0 / 2
1998	4,325	20.9	0 / 2
2001	6,578	24.9	1 / 2
2005	6,301	25.3	1 / 2
2007	5,849	25.4	1 / 2
2011	3,998	19.4	0 / 2
2015	5,730	24.5	1 / 2
2019	4,830	18.6	0 / 2
2022	4,927	18.1	0 / 2
2026	3,891	13.35	0 / 2
