= 1990 Danish general election =

- 12 December 1990
- All 179 seats in the Folketing; 90 seats needed for a majority
- Turnout: 82.84%
Party	Leader	Vote %	Seats	+/–
Social Democrats	Svend Auken	37.38	69	+14
Conservatives	Poul Schlüter	15.97	30	−5
Venstre	Uffe Ellemann-Jensen	15.79	29	+7
SF	Gert Petersen	8.30	15	−9
Progress	Pia Kjærsgaard	6.44	12	−4
Centre Democrats	Mimi Jakobsen	5.11	9	0
Social Liberals	Marianne Jelved	3.55	7	−3
KrF	Flemming Kofod-Svendsen	2.29	4	0
Elected in the Faroe Islands
Social Democratic	Atli Dam	27.05	1	+1
People's	Jógvan Sundstein	25.63	1	0
Elected in Greenland
Siumut	Jonathan Motzfeldt	42.77	1	0
Atassut	Konrad Steenholdt	36.65	1	0
This lists parties that won seats. See the complete results below.

Government before	Government after election
Schlüter III; K–V–R	Schlüter IV; K–V

General elections were held in Denmark on 12 December 1990. Although the election resulted in a strong gain for the Social Democratic Party, Poul Schlüter's coalition government was able to continue despite the Danish Social Liberal Party leaving. Schlüter's coalition consisted of the Conservative People's Party and Venstre. Voter turnout was 83% in Denmark proper, 54% in the Faroe Islands and 51% in Greenland.

== Results ==
Party	Votes	%	Seats	+/–
Denmark proper
Social Democrats	1,211,121	37.38	69	+14
Conservative People's Party	517,293	15.97	30	–5
Venstre	511,643	15.79	29	+7
Socialist People's Party	268,759	8.30	15	–9
Progress Party	208,484	6.44	12	–4
Centre Democrats	165,556	5.11	9	0
Danish Social Liberal Party	114,888	3.55	7	–3
Christian People's Party	74,174	2.29	4	0
Common Course	57,896	1.79	0	0
Red–Green Alliance	54,038	1.67	0	New
The Greens	27,642	0.85	0	0
Justice Party of Denmark	17,181	0.53	0	New
Humanist Party	763	0.02	0	New
Independents	10,224	0.32	0	0
Total	3,239,662	100.00	175	0
Valid votes	3,239,662	99.21		
Invalid/blank votes	25,758	0.79		
Total votes	3,265,420	100.00		
Registered voters/turnout	3,941,666	82.84		
Faroe Islands
Social Democratic Party	4,835	27.05	1	+1
People's Party	4,582	25.63	1	0
Union Party	4,558	25.50	0	–1
Republican Party	2,377	13.30	0	0
Self-Government	1,240	6.94	0	0
Christian People's Party	285	1.59	0	0
Total	17,877	100.00	2	0
Valid votes	17,877	99.56		
Invalid/blank votes	79	0.44		
Total votes	17,956	100.00		
Registered voters/turnout	33,016	54.39		
Greenland
Siumut	8,272	42.77	1	0
Atassut	7,087	36.65	1	0
Inuit Ataqatigiit	3,281	16.97	0	0
Polar Party	366	1.89	0	0
Independents	333	1.72	0	New
Total	19,339	100.00	2	0
Valid votes	19,339	96.31		
Invalid/blank votes	741	3.69		
Total votes	20,080	100.00		
Registered voters/turnout	39,511	50.82		
Source: Nohlen & Stöver

== See also ==
- List of members of the Folketing, 1990–1994
