= 1984 Danish general election =

- 10 January 1984
- All 179 seats in the Folketing; 90 seats needed for a majority
- Turnout: 88.01%
| Party | Leader | Vote % | Seats | +/– |
|---|---|---|---|---|
| Social Democrats | Anker Jørgensen | 31.60 | 56 | −3 |
| Conservatives | Poul Schlüter | 23.45 | 42 | +16 |
| Venstre | Henning Christophersen | 12.07 | 22 | +2 |
| SF | Gert Petersen | 11.51 | 21 | 0 |
| Social Liberals | Niels Helveg Petersen | 5.49 | 10 | +1 |
| Centre Democrats | Erhard Jakobsen | 4.60 | 8 | −7 |
| Progress | Mogens Glistrup | 3.59 | 6 | −10 |
| KrF | Christian Christensen | 2.73 | 5 | +1 |
| Left Socialists | Collective leadership | 2.73 | 5 | 0 |
Elected in the Faroe Islands
| Union | Pauli Ellefsen | 25.86 | 1 | 0 |
| People's | Jógvan Sundstein | 25.10 | 1 | +1 |
Elected in Greenland
| Atassut | Lars Chemnitz | 43.51 | 1 | 0 |
| Siumut | Jonathan Motzfeldt | 42.76 | 1 | 0 |
This lists parties that won seats. See the complete results below.

| Government before | Government after election |
|---|---|
| Schlüter I K–V–CD–KrF | Schlüter I K–V–CD–KrF |

General elections were held in Denmark on 10 January 1984, after the opposition voted against the centre-right four-party government's state budget bill. Although the Social Democratic Party remained the largest in the Folketing with 56 of the 179 seats, the Conservative People's Party achieved its best-ever result, gaining 16 seats. The coalition partners Venstre and the Christian People's Party also increased their representation, although the fourth government party, the Centre Democrats, lost seven of their 15 seats. Overall the coalition government won three more seats, and Poul Schlüter continued as prime minister.

Voter turnout was 88% in Denmark proper, 61% in the Faroe Islands and 64% in Greenland.

== Results ==
| Party | Votes | % | Seats | +/– |
Denmark proper
| Social Democrats | 1,062,561 | 31.60 | 56 | –3 |
| Conservative People's Party | 788,224 | 23.45 | 42 | +16 |
| Venstre | 405,737 | 12.07 | 22 | +2 |
| Socialist People's Party | 387,122 | 11.51 | 21 | 0 |
| Danish Social Liberal Party | 184,642 | 5.49 | 10 | +1 |
| Centre Democrats | 154,553 | 4.60 | 8 | –7 |
| Progress Party | 120,641 | 3.59 | 6 | –10 |
| Christian People's Party | 91,623 | 2.73 | 5 | +1 |
| Left Socialists | 89,356 | 2.66 | 5 | 0 |
| Justice Party of Denmark | 50,381 | 1.50 | 0 | 0 |
| Communist Party of Denmark | 23,085 | 0.69 | 0 | 0 |
| Socialist Workers Party | 2,151 | 0.06 | 0 | 0 |
| Communist Party of Denmark/Marxist–Leninists | 978 | 0.03 | 0 | New |
| Independents | 956 | 0.03 | 0 | 0 |
| Total | 3,362,010 | 100.00 | 175 | 0 |
| Valid votes | 3,362,010 | 99.27 | | |
| Invalid/blank votes | 24,723 | 0.73 | | |
| Total votes | 3,386,733 | 100.00 | | |
| Registered voters/turnout | 3,829,604 | 88.44 | | |
Faroe Islands
| Union Party | 4,744 | 25.86 | 1 | 0 |
| People's Party | 4,605 | 25.10 | 1 | +1 |
| Social Democratic Party | 4,317 | 23.53 | 0 | –1 |
| Republican Party | 3,646 | 19.87 | 0 | 0 |
| Self-Government | 1,033 | 5.63 | 0 | 0 |
| Total | 18,345 | 100.00 | 2 | 0 |
| Valid votes | 18,345 | 99.60 | | |
| Invalid/blank votes | 73 | 0.40 | | |
| Total votes | 18,418 | 100.00 | | |
| Registered voters/turnout | 30,207 | 60.97 | | |
Greenland
| Atassut | 9,308 | 43.51 | 1 | 0 |
| Siumut | 9,148 | 42.76 | 1 | 0 |
| Inuit Ataqatigiit | 2,939 | 13.74 | 0 | New |
| Total | 21,395 | 100.00 | 2 | 0 |
| Valid votes | 21,395 | 97.13 | | |
| Invalid/blank votes | 633 | 2.87 | | |
| Total votes | 22,028 | 100.00 | | |
| Registered voters/turnout | 34,448 | 63.95 | | |
Source: Nohlen & Stöver, Danmarks Statistik

== See also ==
- List of members of the Folketing, 1984–1987
