= Left Socialists =

Danish political organisation (1968–2013)

Left Socialists Venstresocialisterne
- Abbreviation: VS
- Founded: 1968
- Dissolved: 8 September 2013
- Split from: Socialist People's Party
- Succeeded by: Red–Green Alliance
- Headquarters: Griffenfeldsgade 41; 2200 Copenhagen N
- Newspaper: Solidaritet
- Ideology: Marxism; Democratic socialism; Revolutionary socialism
- Political position: Far-left

Election symbol
- Y

The Left Socialists (Danish: Venstresocialisterne, abbr. VS) were a Marxist and socialist political organisation in Denmark. From 1968 to 1998, it was a registered political party also known as the Left Socialist Party. It was formed from a split in the Socialist People's Party (SF). It had a young wing called Youth of the Left Socialists.

The party saw minor electoral success before joining the Red–Green Alliance in 1989 to contest elections jointly with other socialist parties. Individual party activity diminished afterwards, culminating in the Left Socialists dissolving themselves in 2013.

== History ==
The Left Socialists emerged from a split in the Socialist People's Party (SF), which itself was a splinter of the Communist Party of Denmark (DKP). The SF was established in 1959 by members of the DKP who had been expelled from the party for criticising the Soviet Union's intervention in the Hungarian Revolution of 1956. The results of the 1966 general election opened up the possibility of a leftist majority government for the first time in Danish history, between an SF minority and a plurality of Social Democrats, who were more moderate. The two parties subsequently established a so-called "red cabinet", which lasted until 1968, when six SF members of the Folketing defected and formed the Left Socialists in 1968.

In 1989, the Left Socialists, DKP, and Trotskyist Socialist Workers Party agreed to form an electoral alliance – the Red–Green Alliance – to contest the 1990 general election together. The alliance did not win any seats.

In 1998, the Left Socialists deregistered as a political party and became a political organisation. The Left Socialists' activities declined afterwards, with members focusing most of their efforts on the electoral success of the Red–Green Alliance.

Seven members of the Left Socialists, including several of its leaders, were arrested by Danish authorities on 20 February 2006. They were charged with providing material support to a foreign terrorist organisation because the organisation had sent money raised from selling t-shirts to the Popular Front for the Liberation of Palestine.

At a general meeting on 8 September 2013, the leadership of the Left Socialists voted 14 to 1 to disband, with its chairman Per Clausen explaining they did not want to be "a party within a party", in reference to the Red–Green Alliance.

== Ideology ==
The Left Socialists described themselves as "Marxist, democratic, and revolutionary socialists".

== Publications ==
The Left Socialists published a newspaper named Solidaritet ("Solidarity") and maintained a website which posted party press releases and Solidaritet issues. Solidaritet became independent from the Left Socialists when it transformed from a party to an organisation.

== Election results ==
An election poster by the Left Socialists in support of the Red–Green Alliance

Folketing
Year	Votes			Seats	
Year	#	%	± pp	#	±
1968	57,184	2.0	+2.0	4 / 179	New
1971	45,979	1.6	-0.4	0 / 179	▼4
1973	44,843	1.5	-0.1	0 / 179	0
1975	63,579	2.1	+0.6	4 / 179	▲4
1977	83,667	2.7	+0.6	5 / 179	▲1
1979	116,047	3.7	+1.0	6 / 179	▲1
1981	82,711	2.7	-1.0	5 / 179	▼1
1984	89,356	2.7	0.0	5 / 179	0
1987	46,141	1.4	-1.3	0 / 179	▼5
1988	20,303	0.6	-0.7	0 / 179	0
