= Johan Poulsen =

Faroese politician

- Born: September 26, 1890; Toftir, Faroe Islands
- Died: June 24, 1980 (aged 89)
- Occupations: Teacher, politician
- Title: Leader of the Union Party
- Term: 1948–1970
- Predecessor: Andras Samuelsen
- Successor: Trygvi Samuelsen
- Political party: Union Party (Faroe Islands)

Johan Martin Fredrik Poulsen (September 26, 1890 – June 24, 1980) was a Faroese teacher and politician for the Union Party.

Poulsen was born in Toftir. He represented the Union Party in the Faroese Parliament for a full 50 years, from the 1920 election until the 1970 election, as a representative from Eysturoy. As such, he was the longest-ever sitting member of the Løgting. He served as speaker of the Løgting from 1932 to 1936, 1938 to 1940, and 1951 to 1958, and as deputy speaker from 1958 to 1970. He was also a member of the Danish Parliament from 1939 to 1943 and from 1950 to 1964, and a member of the Nordic Council from 1953 to 1964. In addition, Poulsen served as party leader for 22 years, from 1948 to 1970.

He graduated from the Faroese Teachers School (Faroese: Føroya Læraraskúli) in 1908 and took a one-year program at the State Teachers School (Danish: Statens Lærerhøjskole) in Copenhagen from 1914 to 1915. Poulsen worked as a teacher in Glyvrar, Lamba, and Søldarfjørður from 1908 to 1917, and in Strendur from 1917 to 1958. He became a school administrator in 1933.

Poulsen was a member of the parish council in the Municipality of Sjóvar from 1919 to 1962, chairing it from 1933 to 1952. He was a member of the Sjóvar municipal council from 1931 to 1934, head of the Sjóvar municipal health insurance organization from 1919 to 1933, and secretary and treasurer at the Faroese Central Association of Health Insurance Organizations from 1921 to 1959 (and became a board member in 1926). Poulsen was a member of the Faroese county church inspection office from 1924 to 1960 and 1967 to 1970, and a member of the school board from 1932 to 1935 and 1938 to 1971. He became chairman of The Faroe Insurance Company in 1948, and was a board member of the Faroese Accident Insurance Company from 1934 to 1965, and again from 1970 onward (serving as chairman from 1942 to 1962).
