= 1971 Danish general election =

- 21 September 1971
- All 179 seats in the Folketing; 90 seats needed for a majority
- Turnout: 87.16%
Party	Leader	Vote %	Seats	+/–
Social Democrats	Jens Otto Krag	37.27	70	+8
Conservatives	Poul Møller	16.69	31	−6
Venstre	Poul Hartling	15.64	30	−4
Social Liberals	Hilmar Baunsgaard	14.34	27	0
SF	Sigurd Ømann	9.11	17	+6
Elected in the Faroe Islands
Social Democratic	Jákup Frederik Øregaard	31.77	1	0
People's	Hákun Djurhuus	20.42	1	0
Elected in Greenland
Independents	–	100	2	0
This lists parties that won seats. See the complete results below.

Government before	Government after election
Baunsgaard; R–K–V	Krag III; Social Democrats

General elections were held in Denmark on 21 September 1971 and in the Faroe Islands on 5 October. The Social Democratic Party remained the largest in the Folketing, with 70 of the 179 seats. Voter turnout was 87% in Denmark proper, 57% in the Faroe Islands and 52% in Greenland (where only one of the two constituencies was contested as the other had only a single candidate who was elected unopposed).

== Electoral system ==
All members were elected by party-list proportional representation in multi-member constituencies and in levelling seats filled at-large using overall party vote shares. The districts elected between 2 and 14 members each. They were the first elections using the new counties as constituencies.

== Campaign ==
The incumbent Baunsgaard government called an early election as a referendum on the Danish ascension to the common market. The campaign was also dominated by the policies of austerity instituted by the government.

== Results ==
Party	Votes	%	Seats	+/–
Denmark proper
Social Democrats	1,074,777	37.27	70	+8
Conservative People's Party	481,335	16.69	31	–6
Venstre	450,904	15.64	30	–4
Danish Social Liberal Party	413,620	14.34	27	0
Socialist People's Party	262,756	9.11	17	+6
Christian People's Party	57,072	1.98	0	New
Justice Party of Denmark	50,231	1.74	0	0
Left Socialists	45,979	1.59	0	–4
Communist Party of Denmark	39,564	1.37	0	0
Schleswig Party	6,743	0.23	0	0
Independents	919	0.03	0	0
Total	2,883,900	100.00	175	0
Valid votes	2,883,900	99.30		
Invalid/blank votes	20,196	0.70		
Total votes	2,904,096	100.00		
Registered voters/turnout	3,332,004	87.16		
Faroe Islands
Social Democratic Party	4,170	31.77	1	0
Union Party	2,855	21.75	0	0
People's Party	2,680	20.42	1	0
Self-Government	648	4.94	0	New
Progress Party	362	2.76	0	0
Independents	2,410	18.36	0	New
Total	13,125	100.00	2	0
Valid votes	13,125	99.42		
Invalid/blank votes	77	0.58		
Total votes	13,202	100.00		
Registered voters/turnout	23,260	56.76		
Greenland
Independents	7,148	100.00	2	0
Total	7,148	100.00	2	0
Valid votes	7,148	97.34		
Invalid/blank votes	195	2.66		
Total votes	7,343	100.00		
Registered voters/turnout	14,104	52.06		
Source: Nohlen & Stöver, Danmarks Statistik

== Aftermath ==
The election result was one of the closest in Danish history, with the right and left mainland blocks separated by only one seat. Ultimately former prime minister Jens Otto Krag was returned to power through an agreement with the two independents elected from the Greenland constituencies.
