= Erlendur Patursson =

Faroese politician and writer

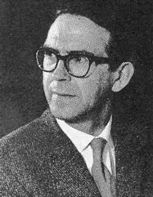
Patursson in the 1950s

Erlendur Patursson (20 August 1913 – 16 June 1986) was a Faroese politician and writer.

Erlendur was born in 1913 in Kirkjubøur. He was the son of the politician Jóannes Patursson.

He became cand.pol. in 1940 and was one of the founders of Tjóðveldisflokkurin, the Faroese Republican Party, in 1948. The Republicans are a left-wing Faroese political party in favor of national independence from Denmark. He was a member of the Løgting from 1958 to 1966 and again in 1970–86. From 1963 to 1967, he was minister of fishery and finance, and from 1973 to 1977 a member of the Folketing.

Patursson came up with the idea for the Nordic House in the Faroe Islands. In the Nordic council he pushed for Greenlandic independence as well as independence for Åland.

As a writer Patursson has been honoured for his work concerning Faroese fishermen from 1850 to 1970. In 1981, he received the Faroese Literature Prize, M. A. Jacobsens Heiðursløn, for these writings.
