= Communist Workers Party (Denmark) =

Communist Workers Party Kommunistisk Arbejderparti
- Abbreviation: KAP
- Founder: Benito Scocozza
- Founded: 1976
- Dissolved: 1994
- Preceded by: Kommunistisk Forbund Marxister-Leninister
- Merged into: Red-Green Alliance
- Succeeded by: Workers' Communist Party
- Ideology: Communism; Marxism-Leninism; Maoism
- Political position: Far-left

Election symbol
- R

Communist Workers Party (Danish: Kommunistisk Arbejderparti, KAP) was a Danish Maoist political party founded in 1976 and dissolved in 1994. Members of KAP integrated into The Red-Green Alliance.

== Publications ==
- Kommunistisk Arbejderparti: The programme of the Workers' Communist Party of Denmark, Copenhagen: Forlaget Oktober, 1977
