= Peter Mohr Dam =

Faroe Islands politician

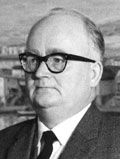

Prime Minister of the Faroe Islands
- In office 12 January 1967 – 8 November 1968
- Monarch: Frederik IX
- Preceded by: Hákun Djurhuus
- Succeeded by: Kristian Djurhuus
- In office 8 January 1959 – 4 January 1963
- Monarch: Frederik IX
- Preceded by: Kristian Djurhuus
- Succeeded by: Hákun Djurhuus

Personal details
- Born: 11 August 1898 Skopun, Sandoy, Faroe Islands
- Died: 8 November 1968 (aged 70) Tórshavn, Streymoy, Faroe Islands
- Party: Javnaðarflokkurin
- Profession: Teacher

Peter Mohr Dam (11 August 1898 – 8 November 1968) was a Faroe Islands politician who was one of the founders of the Social Democratic Javnaðarflokkurin party in 1926.

== Biography ==
Dam was born on 11 August 1898, in Skopun, Faroe Islands. The first position he took was becoming a teacher in Tvøroyri. He then became a member of the town council of Tvøroyri from 1925 until his death, and later mayor of the same city from 1934–1957.

He was member of the Faroese Løgting from 1928 until his death in 1968. He was also chairman of the Social Democratic Javnaðarflokkurin party from 1933 until his death.

He was member of the Danish Folketing as one of two Faroese members from 1947–1957, 1964–1967, and 1968. From 1959 to 1963 and from 1967 to 1968 he was the Prime Minister of the Faroe Islands (Løgmaður).

Dam died in office, on 8 November 1968.

== Personal life ==
He was the father of three-time prime minister Atli P. Dam. His granddaughters, Helena Dam á Neystabø and Rigmor Dam, are also Social Democratic politicians.
