= Pauli Ellefsen =

Prime Minister of the Faroe Islands (1981–1985)

Prime Minister of the Faroe Islands
- In office 5 January 1981 – 10 January 1985
- Monarch: Margrethe II
- Preceded by: Atli P. Dam
- Succeeded by: Atli P. Dam

Personal details
- Born: Joen Pauli Højgaard Ellefsen; 20 April 1936 Miðvágur, Vágar, Faroe Islands
- Died: 24 August 2012 (aged 76) Hoyvík, Faroe Islands
- Party: Sambandsflokkurin
- Spouse: Henni Egholm
- Relatives: Elias Ellefsen á Skipagøtu (grandson); Jana Mittún (granddaughter); Óli Mittún (grandson)

Joen Pauli Højgaard Ellefsen (20 April 1936 – 24 August 2012) was a Faroese politician and member of the Union Party. He was Prime Minister of the Faroe Islands from 1981 to 1985.

Pauli Ellefsen was the eldest of eight children born to Sofia (née Højgaard) from Rituvík and Joen Elias Ellefsen from Miðvágur. He was the brother of former Parliament member Svend Aage Ellefsen, and brother-in-law of former parliament member Jóannes Dalsgaard. He was married to Henni Egholm (née Rasmussen). He and his wife lived in Hoyvík, near Tórshavn.

Ellefsen worked as a fisherman from 1954 to 1956. After that, he worked as a telecommunications technician and later he attended a business school in Copenhagen. In 1969, he became a government surveyor. He lived in Denmark while he was studying and a few years after that, but in the early 1970s, he moved back to the Faroes with his family. He and Jógvan Sundstein, who later became Prime Minister of the Faroe Islands, worked together as Chartered Accountants. In 1975 he started his own auditor firm.

Ellefsen was first elected to the Løgting in 1974. From 1974 to 1990 he was the chairman of the Union Party, which advocates a stronger bond between Denmark and the Faroe Islands. From 1977 to 1987 and 1988 to 1990 he was one of the two Faroese members of the Danish Folketing. From 1975 to 1976 and in 1979 he represented the Faroese in the Nordic Council.

== Honor ==
Ellefsen was awarded the Order of the Dannebrog, Knight 1st Class (Ridder af 1. grad) on 7 May 1984.

== Personal life ==
Pauli and his wife had four children. Their youngest daughter, Gunn, is the current chairperson of the Handball Federation of the Faroe Islands and through her he is the grandfather of Faroese international players Elias and Rói Ellefsen á Skipagøtu. Through his other daughter, he is the grandfather of the handball playing siblings Pauli, Jana, and Óli Mittún.

Political offices
Preceded by Atli Dam	Prime Minister of the Faroe Islands; 1981-1985	Succeeded by Atli Dam
