= Jógvan Sundstein =

Faroese politician (1933–2024)

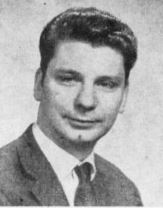

Prime Minister of the Faroe Islands
- In office 18 January 1989 – 15 January 1991
- Monarch: Margrethe II
- Preceded by: Atli P. Dam
- Succeeded by: Atli P. Dam

Personal details
- Born: 25 May 1933; Tórshavn, Streymoy, Faroe Islands
- Died: 8 July 2024 (aged 91); Holbæk, Denmark
- Political party: Fólkaflokkurin
- Relatives: N0tail (grandson)

Jógvan Sundstein (Faroese: [ˈjɛkvan ˈsʊn̥stai̯n]; 25 May 1933 – 8 July 2024) was a Faroese politician and member of the Faroese People's Party.

Sundstein was the son of Johanna Malena (born Jensen) and Hans Jacob Matras Sundstein from Tórshavn. He was married to Lydia Marsten (born 20 November 1927) from Klaksvík.

Sundstein was a certified accountant and was a member of numerous boards of directors. In 1979 he was elected to the Løgting for the first time. He was the speaker of the Løgting from 1980 to 1984 and 1988 to 1989. He was Prime Minister of the Faroe Islands (Løgmaður) from 1989 to 1991 and was a minister from 1991 to 1993.

In 2008 Sundstein published his memoirs, becoming the first Faroese politician to do so.

Johan Sundstein, better known as N0tail, is his grandson.

Sundstein died on 8 July 2024, at the age of 91.

== Works ==
- Frá barnaárum ungu til lívsins heystartíð. Stiðin 2008

== Notes ==
- Løgtingið 150 − Hátíðarrit. Tórshavn 2002, Volume 2, p. 351 (PDF download)

Political offices
Preceded by Atli Dam	Prime Minister of the Faroe Islands; 1989–1991	Succeeded by Atli Dam
