= Hákun Djurhuus =

Prime Minister of the Faroe Islands (1963–1967)

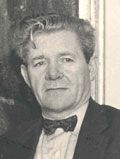
- Djurhuus in 1954

Prime Minister of the Faroe Islands
- In office 4 January 1963 – 12 January 1967
- Monarch: Frederik IX
- Preceded by: Peter Mohr Dam
- Succeeded by: Peter Mohr Dam

Personal details
- Born: 11 December 1908; Tórshavn, Streymoy
- Died: 22 September 1987 (aged 78); Tórshavn, Streymoy
- Political party: Fólkaflokkurin
- Spouse: Hjørdis Djurhuus (née Kamban)
- Profession: Teacher

Hákun Djurhuus (11 December 1908 – 22 September 1987) was the prime minister of the Faroe Islands from 1963 to 1967. He was born in Tórshavn.

He was first elected to the Løgting in 1946 and was its speaker 1950–1951. He was member of the town council of Klaksvík from 1946 to 1951, mayor of Klaksvík from 1950 to 1951. He was chairman of the Peoples Party (Fólkaflokkurin) from 1951 to 1980.

He was minister from 1951 to 1954 and Prime Minister from 1963 to 1967. He was member of the Folketing, elected as one of two Faroese members in the periods 1957–1960 and 1968–1973.

Djurhuus withdrew from politics after the 1980 elections.

He died on 22 September 1987.

Political offices
Preceded by Peter Mohr Dam	Prime Minister of the Faroe Islands; 1963-1967	Succeeded by Peter Mohr Dam
