= Atli Dam =

Prime Minister of the Faroe Islands

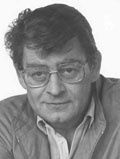

Prime Minister of the Faroe Islands
- In office 15 January 1991 – 18 January 1993
- Monarch: Margrethe II
- Preceded by: Jógvan Sundstein
- Succeeded by: Marita Petersen
- In office 10 January 1985 – 18 January 1989
- Monarch: Margrethe II
- Preceded by: Pauli Ellefsen
- Succeeded by: Jógvan Sundstein
- In office 12 December 1970 – 5 January 1981
- Monarchs: Frederik IX; Margrethe II
- Preceded by: Kristian Djurhuus
- Succeeded by: Pauli Ellefsen

Personal details
- Born: Atli Pætursson Dam; 12 September 1932 Tvøroyri, Faroe Islands
- Died: 7 February 2005 (aged 72) Tórshavn, Faroe Islands
- Political party: Social Democratic

Atli Pætursson Dam (12 September 1932 – 7 February 2005) was a Faroese politician who served as prime minister of the Faroe Islands on three occasions. From 1970 to 1981, 1985 to 1989, and 1991 to 1993. To this date, he is the longest-serving prime minister in Faroese history, having served a total of 16 years.

== Personal life ==
Dam was born in Tvøroyri on 12 September 1932 to Peter Mohr Dam and Sigrid Ragnhild, née Strøm. He received his bachelor's degree in engineering from the Danish Engineering Academy in 1964, and worked for the Danish company Haldor Topsøe until he became prime minister in 1970. He was vice president of the Faroese Mortgage Institution (Føroya Realkreditt) from 1981 to 1985, and again from 1989 until his death.

== Political career ==
He was elected to the Løgting in 1970 and became Minister of Fisheries the same year, being appointed prime minister in the same year. In addition, he was elected as one of two Faroese members of the Danish Folketing from 1987 to 1988 and 1990 to 1994.

One of his biggest political achievements included his negotiations with the Danish Prime Minister Poul Schlüter, which resulted in the Faroese underground and all natural resources thereof becoming property of the Faroese state; before that, it belonged to the Danish. He also held negotiations with neighboring countries that operated fishing fleets near Faroese waters and with the EEC in Brussels over disputing fishing rights, which results in an extension of Faroe Island's fishing limits to 200 nautical miles.

In the wake of the Faroese financial crisis, compounded by his health issues, Dam resigned as prime minister and head of the Social Democratic Party on 18 February 1993, and was succeeded by Marita Petersen. He was not re-elected for the Løgting at the 1994 elections.

Political offices
Preceded by Kristian Djurhuus	Prime Minister of the Faroe Islands; 1970–1981	Succeeded by Pauli Ellefsen
Preceded by Pauli Ellefsen	Prime Minister of the Faroe Islands; 1985–1989	Succeeded by Jógvan Sundstein
Preceded by Jógvan Sundstein	Prime Minister of the Faroe Islands; 1991–1993	Succeeded by Marita Petersen
