= List of members of the Løgting, 1978–1980 =

List of the members of the Faroese Løgting in the period 1978–1980. The parliament had 32 members this period. The Social Democratic Party and the Union Party were the largest parties with 8 members each, followed by Republic and People's Party with 6 members each. Self-Government Party and Progress Party had 2 members each.

Name	Party	Electoral district	Comments
Hilmar Bech	Social Democratic Party	Suðuroy	Speaker of the Løgting 1979–1980.
Óli Breckmann	People's Party	Suðurstreymoy	
Atli Dam	Social Democratic Party	Suðuroy	Prime minister 1978–1980.
Hákun Djurhuus	People's Party	Norðoyar	
Jógvan Durhuus	Republic (Tjóðveldið)	Norðurstreymoy	
Pauli Ellefsen	Union Party	Suðurstreymoy	
Edmund í Garði	People's Party	Eysturoy	
Adolf Hansen	Progress Party	Eysturoy	
Haldor Hansen	Social Democratic Party	Vágar	
Signar Hansen	Republic (Tjóðveldið)	Eysturoy	
Jona Henriksen	Social Democratic Party	Suðurstreymoy	
Demmus Hentze	People's Party	Sandoy	Minister 1978–1980. Eyðun M. Viderø took his seat.
Finnbogi Ísakson	Republic (Tjóðveldið)	Norðoyar	
Andreas Petur Jacobsen	Social Democratic Party	Suðuroy	
Juul Jacobsen	Progress Party	Suðurstreymoy	
Øssur Dam Jacobsen	People's Party	Norðurstreymoy	
Asbjørn Joensen	Self-Government Party	Norðoyar	
Ivan Johannesen	Union Party	Vágar	
Hilmar Kass	Self-Government Party	Suðurstreymoy	
Karin Kjølbro	Republic (Tjóðveldið)	Suðurstreymoy	
Heðin M. Klein	Republic (Tjóðveldið)	Sandoy	Minister 1978–1980. Hans Marius Joensen took his seat.
Jacob Lindenskov	Social Democratic Party	Suðurstreymoy	Minister 1978–1979.
Sverre Midjord	Social Democratic Party	Suðuroy	
Flemming Mikkelsen	Union Party	Suðuroy	
Agnar Nielsen	Union Party	Norðurstreymoy	Speaker of the Løgting 1978–1979.
Eli Nolsøe	Union Party	Norðoyar	
Johannes Martin Olsen	Union Party	Eysturoy	
Jógvan I. Olsen	Union Party	Eysturoy	
Erlendur Patursson	Republic (Tjóðveldið)	Suðurstreymoy	
Eilif Samuelsen	Union Party	Suðurstreymoy	
Jógvan Sundstein	People's Party	Suðurstreymoy	
Jørgen Thomsen	Social Democratic Party	Eysturoy	
