= List of members of the Løgting, 1988–1990 =

List of the members of the Faroese Løgting in the period 1988–1990, they were elected at the general election on 17 November 1988. The parliament had 32 members this period.

== List of elected members of the Løgting ==
Name	Party	Electoral district	Comments
Óli Breckmann	People's Party	Suðurstreymoy	
Atli Dam	Social Democratic Party	Suðuroy	Prime minister 1988–1989.
Niels Pauli Danielsen	Christian People's Party	Norðoyar	
Jógvan Durhuus	Republic (Tjóðveldið)	Norðurstreymoy	Minister 1988–1989. Øssur av Steinum took his seat.
Pauli Ellefsen	Union Party	Suðurstreymoy	
Svend Aage Ellefsen	People's Party	Vágar	
Signar Hansen	Republic (Tjóðveldið)	Eysturoy	Minister 1989–1990. Petur Reinert took his seat.
Heini O. Heinesen	Republic (Tjóðveldið)	Norðoyar	
Sune Jacobsen	Union Party	Vágar	
Edmund Joensen	Union Party	Eysturoy	
Vilhelm Johannesen	Social Democratic Party	Norðoyar	Minister 1988–1989.
Jógvan A. Johannessen	Social Democratic Party	Sandoy	
Anfinn Kallsberg	People's Party	Norðoyar	Minister 1989.
Jógvan við Keldu	People's Party	Norðoyar	
Karin Kjølbro	Republic (Tjóðveldið)	Suðurstreymoy	
Lasse Klein	Self-Government Party	Eysturoy	
Jacob Lindenskov	Social Democratic Party	Suðurstreymoy	
Poul Michelsen	People's Party	Suðurstreymoy	
Flemming Mikkelsen	Union Party	Suðuroy	
Tordur Niclasen	Christian People's Party	Eysturoy	Minister 1989.
Agnar Nielsen	Union Party	Norðurstreymoy	Speaker of the Løgting 1989–1990.
Hergeir Nielsen	Republic (Tjóðveldið)	Suðuroy	
Henrik Old	Social Democratic Party	Suðuroy	
Jógvan I. Olsen	Union Party	Eysturoy	Minister 1989–1990. Jákup Lamhauge took his seat.
Olaf Olsen	People's Party	Eysturoy	Minister 1989–1990.
John Petersen	People's Party	Sandoy	
Marita Petersen	Social Democratic Party	Suðurstreymoy	
Tórbjørn Poulsen	Self-Government Party	Suðurstreymoy	
Jóngerð Purkhús	Republic (Tjóðveldið)	Suðurstreymoy	Minister 1988–1990. Finnbogi Ísakson took her seat.
Eilif Samuelsen	Union Party	Suðurstreymoy	
Jógvan Sundstein	People's Party	Suðurstreymoy	Speaker of the Løgting 1988–1989. Prime Minister 1989–1990. Eliesar Arge took his seat.
Jørgen Thomsen	Social Democratic Party	Eysturoy	
