= List of members of the Løgting, 1980–1984 =

List of the members of the Faroese Løgting in the period 1980–1984. The parliament had 32 members this period.

== Elected members of the Løgting ==
Name	Party	Electoral district	Comments
Hilmar Bech	Social Democratic Party	Suðuroy	
Óli Breckmann	People's Party	Suðurstreymoy	
Jóannes Dalsgaard	Social Democratic Party	Suðurstreymoy	
Atli Dam	Social Democratic Party	Suðurstreymoy	Prime Minister 1980–1981
Pauli Ellefsen	Union Party	Suðurstreymoy	Prime Minister 1981–1984
Svend Aage Ellefsen	People's Party	Vágar	
Adolf Hansen	Progress Party	Eysturoy	
Finnbogi Ísakson	Republic (Tjóðveldið)	Norðoyar	
Juul Jacobsen	Progress Party	Suðurstreymoy	
Øssur Dam Jacobsen	People's Party	Norðurstreymoy	
Asbjørn Joensen	Self-Government Party	Norðoyar	
Hans Marius Joensen	Republic (Tjóðveldið)	Sandoy	
Ivan Johannesen	Union Party	Vágar	
Vilhelm Johannesen	Social Democratic Party	Norðoyar	Minister 1980–1981
Anfinn Kallsberg	People's Party	Norðoyar	Minister 1983–1984
Hilmar Kass	Self-Government Party	Suðurstreymoy	
Karin Kjølbro	Republic (Tjóðveldið)	Suðurstreymoy	
Jacob Lindenskov	Social Democratic Party	Suðurstreymoy	
Flemming Mikkelsen	Union Party	Suðuroy	
Ove Mikkelsen	Republic (Tjóðveldið)	Suðuroy	
Agnar Nielsen	Union Party	Norðurstreymoy	
Eli Nolsøe	Union Party	Norðoyar	
Frederik Olsen	Self-Government Party	Eysturoy	
Johannes Martin Olsen	Union Party	Eysturoy	
Jógvan I. Olsen	Union Party	Eysturoy	
Olaf Olsen	People's Party	Eysturoy	Minister 1981–1983. Edmund í Garði took his seat
Tórálvur Mohr Olsen	Social Democratic Party	Sandoy	
Erlendur Patursson	Republic (Tjóðveldið)	Suðurstreymoy	
Petur Reinert	Republic (Tjóðveldið)	Eysturoy	
Eilif Samuelsen	Union Party	Suðurstreymoy	
Jógvan Sundstein	People's Party	Suðurstreymoy	Speaker of the Løgting 1980–1984
Jørgen Thomsen	Social Democratic Party	Eysturoy	
