= List of members of the Løgting, 1974–1978 =

List of the members of the Faroese Løgting in the period 1974–1978. The parliament had 26 members this period. Javnaðarflokkurin and Tjóðveldisflokkurin were the largest parties with 7 and 6 members. Fólkaflokkurin and Sambandsflokkurin had 5 members each, Sjálvstýrisflokkurin had two members and Framburðsflokkurin had one member.

Name	Party	Electoral district	Comments
Eliesar Arge	People's Party	South Streymoy	
Hilmar Bech	Social Democratic Party	Suðuroy	
Óli Breckmann	People's Party	South Streymoy	
Atli Dam	Social Democratic Party	Suðuroy	Prime Minister 1974–1978. Sverre Midjord took his seat.
Hákun Djurhuus	People's Party	Norðoyar	
Jógvan Durhuus	Republic (Tjóðveldisflokkurin)	North Streymoy	
Pauli Ellefsen	Union Party	South Streymoy	
Haldor Hansen	Social Democratic Party	Vágar	
Signar Hansen	Republic (Tjóðveldisflokkurin)	Eysturoy	
Finnbogi Ísakson	Republic (Tjóðveldisflokkurin)	Norðoyar	Minister 1975–1978. Johan Simonsen took his seat.
Asbjørn Joensen	Self-Government Party	Norðoyar	Minister 1974–1975.
Hilmar Kass	Self-Government Party	South Streymoy	
Heðin M. Klein	Republic (Tjóðveldisflokkurin)	Sandoy	
Jacob Lindenskov	Social Democratic Party	South Streymoy	Minister 1974–1978. M. Joensen took his seat 1974–1975, Jona Henriksen 1975–1978.
Ove Mikkelsen	Republic (Tjóðveldisflokkurin)	Suðuroy	
Kjartan Mohr	Framburðsflokkurin	South Streymoy	
Jákup Mortensen	Union Party	Suðuroy	
Agnar Nielsen	Union Party	North Streymoy	
Hjalmar Vilhelm Nielsen	People's Party	Vágar	
Johannes Martin Olsen	Union Party	Eysturoy	
Jógvan I. Olsen	Union Party	Eysturoy	
Poul J. Olsen	Social Democratic Party	Norðoyar	
Tórálvur Mohr Olsen	Social Democratic Party	Sandoy	
Erlendur Patursson	Republic (Tjóðveldisflokkurin)	South Streymoy	
Jógvan Sundstein	People's Party	South Streymoy	
Jákup Frederik Øregaard	Social Democratic Party	Eysturoy	Speaker of the Løgting 1974–1978.
