= Women in the Faroe Islands =

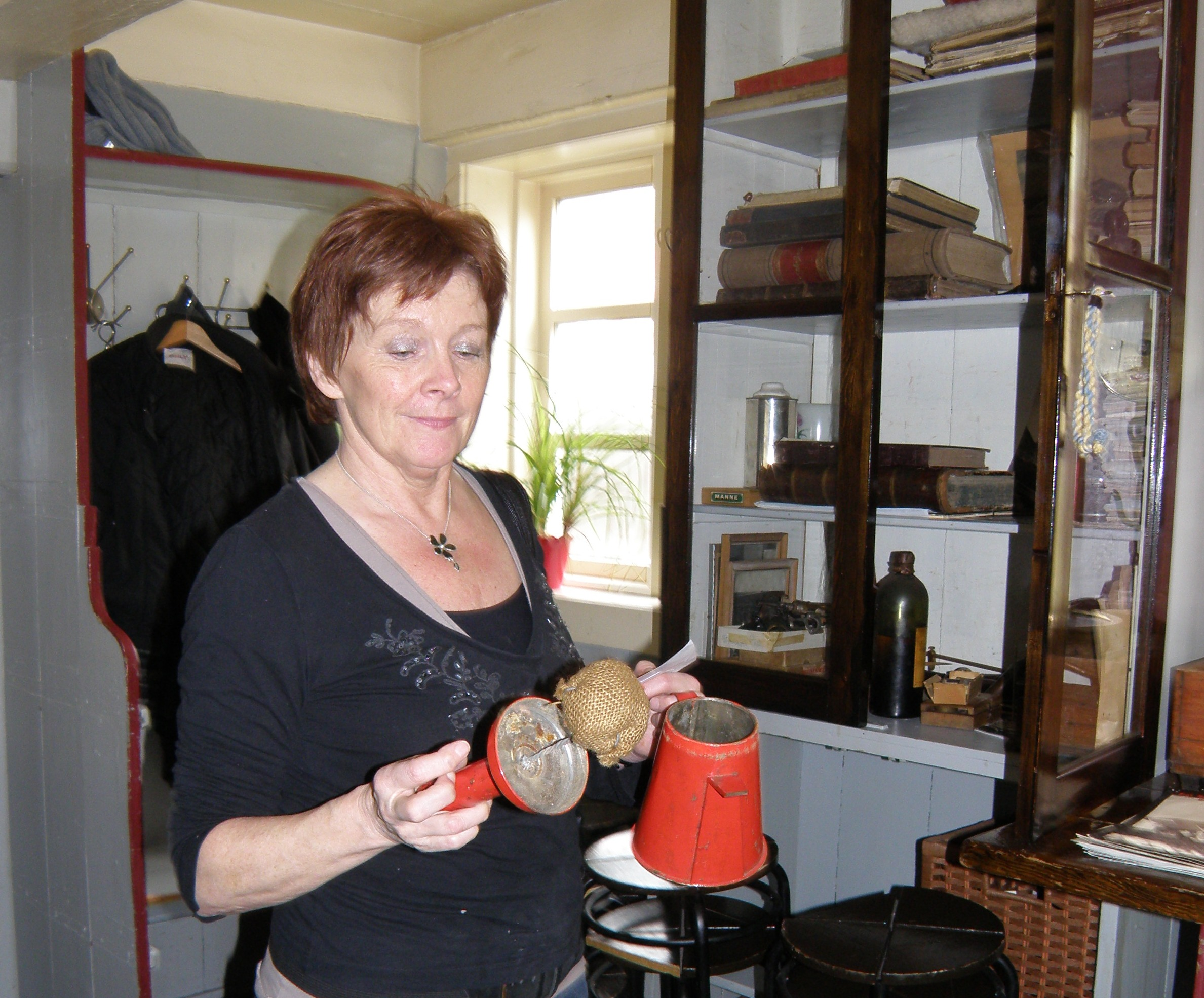
Anna Kirstin Thomsen is a Faroese woman living in Tvøroyri in the Faroe Islands. Thomsen won the Faroese Literature Prize in 2008 for cultural achievement. In this picture, Thomsen is holding an old emergency boat lamp used in the old days by local fishermen. Thomsen currently runs the Pub and Café, a pub and a café that also functions as a museum. She also manages the Sail Loft, a cultural centre.

Women in the Faroe Islands are European women who live in or are from the Faroe Islands, a north Atlantic island group and archipelago that is under the sovereignty of the Kingdom of Denmark. Traditionally, Faroese women have a high standing in the society of Faroe Islanders. Legally, women of the Faroe Islands share equality with men. During the late 19th century, women in the Faroe Islands became wage-earners by participating in jobs such as fish processing and by becoming teachers. In 1915, they obtained women's suffrage. Eventually, Faroe Islander women were able to hold governmental positions.

== Diaspora ==
According to The Copenhagen Post, BBC News, and The Arctic Journal in October 2013, many young Faroese women have been leaving the Faroe Islands to study abroad, particularly in countries such as Denmark, Norway, and the United Kingdom. Many of these women searching for better education settle permanently in Copenhagen, Oslo, and London respectively, without any plan of returning to their native country.

== Parliamentary appointments and elections ==
Faroese women could vote for local elections for the first time on 27 November 1908, and for the parliament (Løgting) in 1915. There was one exception though, where Faroese women were allowed to vote: In 1906 at the referendum for or against free alcohol.

Malla Samuelsen was the first Faroese woman to take seat in the parliament, but only for a short period in 1964. In 1978 two women were elected for a whole period: Karin Kjølbro was elected for the Republican Party (Tjóðveldisflokkurin) and Jona Henriksen was elected for the Social Democratic Party (Javnaðarflokkurin) from 1975-78. The first female minister was Jóngerð Purkhús, who became Minister of finance and environment in 1985. Marita Petersen was the first woman who became Prime Minister of the Faroe Islands, she was Prime Minister from January 1993 until September 1994. After the election of 1994 she also became the first Faroese woman to become Speaker of the Løgting. She was a member of the Social Democratic Party (Javnaðarflokkurin). Lisbeth L. Petersen was the first Faroese woman who was elected for the Danish Folketing as one of two Faroese members. Annika Olsen became the first female Deputy Prime Minister of the Faroe Islands on 14 November 2011 and the first female Minister of Internal Affairs of the Faroe Islands on 26 September 2008.

== Labour movements ==
Andrea Árting (1891–1988) was an active figure in the Faroese labour movement, heading the Tórshavn Working Women's Association for almost 40 years. In 1977, she successfully campaigned for equal pay for male and female workers. On the political front, representing the Loysingarflokkurin or Separatist Party, she was one of the first women to stand for the Løgting in 1940, although she was not elected.
