= Husavik =

Husavik or Húsavik may refer to:

- Húsavík, a town in Norðurþing municipality on the north coast of Iceland
  - Húsavík Airport, an airport serving Húsavík, Iceland
- Husavik, Norway, a village in Austevoll municipality in Vestland county, Norway
- Húsavík Municipality, a municipality of the Faroe Islands
  - Húsavík, Faroe Islands, a village in the Isle of Sandoy, in Húsavík Municipality, Faroe Islands
- Husavik, Manitoba, a community of the Rural Municipality of Gimli, Manitoba, Canada
- "Husavik" (song), a 2020 song performed by Will Ferrell and My Marianne in the film Eurovision Song Contest: The Story of Fire Saga
