= Malla Samuelsen =

Faroese politician

Malene (Malla) Sofie Samuelsen née Poulsen (11 July 1909 – 29 November 1997) was a Faroese politician and feminist who became the first woman to sit in the Løgting, the Faroese parliament, when she served for a short period as a substitute in 1964. She was also one of the founders of the Faroese Women's Association (Kvinnufelagið), frequently serving as its chair.

== Biography ==
Born on 11 July 1909 in Kirkja on the easterly island of Fugloy, Malene Sofie Poulsen was the daughter of the fisherman Petur Pauli Poulsen (1881–1957) and his wife Susanne Elisabeth Zachariasen (1885–1919). One of seven children, after her mother died when she was eight, she was brought up by her maternal grandparents. Her grandfather, Símun Mikkjal Zachariasen, was a poet, politician and schoolteacher who played an active part in Faroese cultural life.

When she was 16, Poulsen moved to Tórshavn where she took care of the house where her uncle and brother lived while attending college. A couple of years later, she went to Copenhagen where she worked as a housemaid. When she was 35 she married a Danish sailor, Carl Niklas Samuelsen, and set up house in Tórshavn. They had two children together. Like many of her compatriots, she was often left alone when her husband was away at sea.

In 1952, Samuelsen was one of those who founded the Faroese women's association Kvinnufelagið í Havn. She was a board member for many years, sometimes the association's chair. She supported the association's goals of improving the political, economic and cultural roles of women. As the political parties showed little interest in having women members, the association set its own agenda, successfully having several women elected to the Tórshavn city council in 1956. Samuelsen, representing the Sjálvstýrisflokkurin party, was among them. She served on a number of committees involved in social services and education, and was re-elected in 1960. In 1964, acting for a short period as a substitute, she became the first woman to sit in the Faroese parliament. It was not until 1978 that the first women, Jona Henriksen and Karin Kjølbro, were officially elected to the Løgting.

In 1965, Samuelsen was appointed head of the Tórshavn old peoples home where she remained for 13 years. She died in Tórshavn on 29 November 1997.
