= Dalur =

- Village
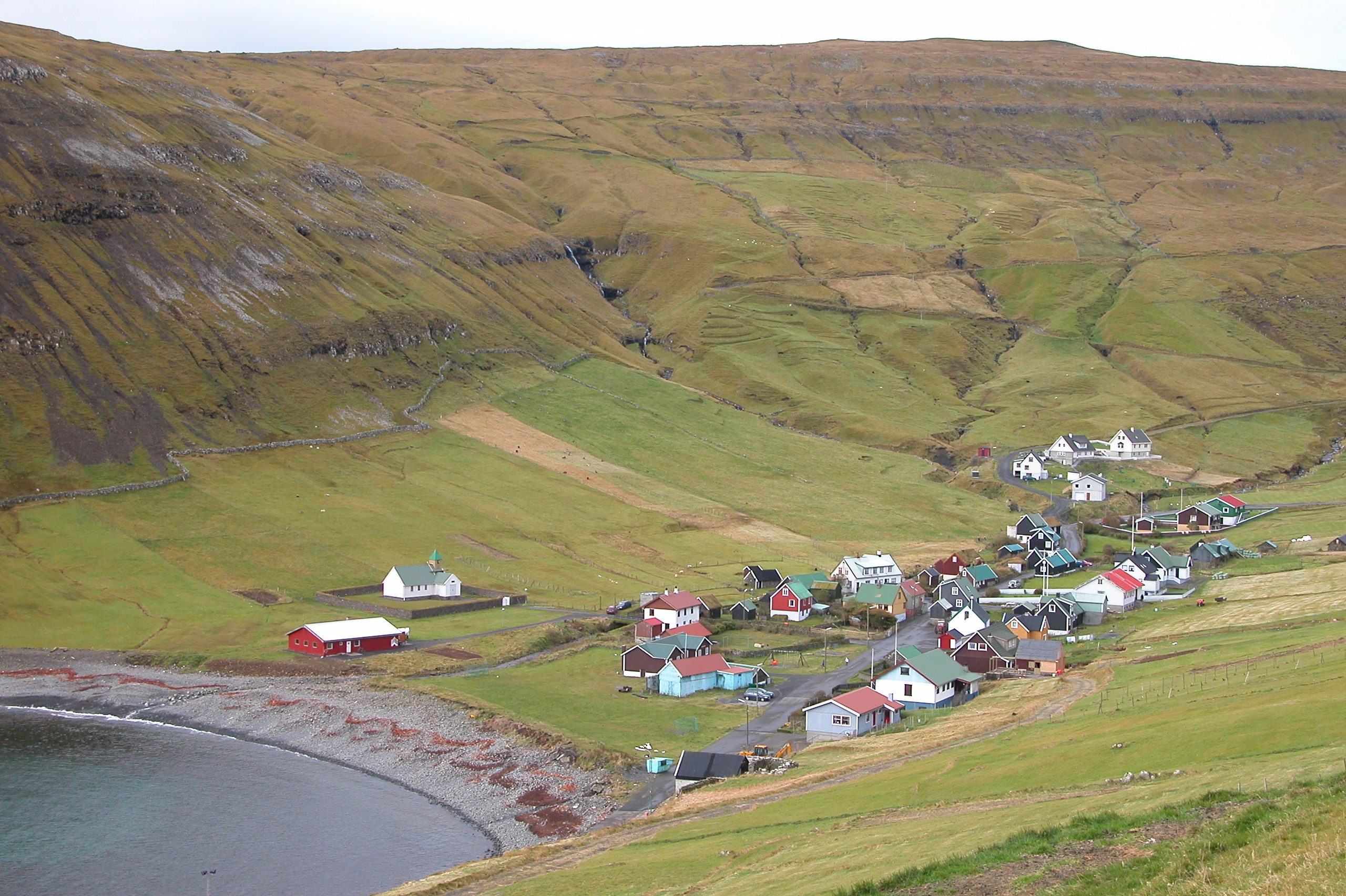
- Dalur

- Location of the village in the Faroe Islands
- Coordinates: 61°46′56″N 6°40′32″W
- State: Kingdom of Denmark
- Constituent country: Faroe Islands
- Island: Sandoy
- Municipality: Húsavík

Population (September 2025)
  - Total: 39
- Time zone: UTC+0 (GMT)
  - Summer (DST): UTC+1 (EST)
- Climate: Cfc

Dalur (Danish: Dal) is a village in the Faroe Islands. Dalur is located on the east-side of Sandoy. The village lies in the bottom of a relatively large valley. Dalur means valley in Faroese.

A little road leads from Dalur to the south-tip of the island. From there it is possible to walk to the bird cliffs Skorin. The church in Dalur was built in 1957 and this is the only church that has ever been here.

== Gallery ==
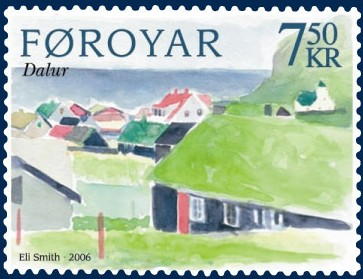
Dalur on a Faroese stamp of 2006.

== See also ==
- List of towns in the Faroe Islands
