= Johan Simonsen =

- Born: February 19, 1917; Tjørnuvík, Faroe Islands
- Died: October 10, 1980 (aged 63)
- Occupation: Politician

Johan Simonsen (February 19, 1917 – October 10, 1980) was a Faroese fisherman and politician for the Republic party.

Simonsen was born in Tjørnuvík. He served as a board member of Klaksvík Hospital (Faroese: Klaksvíkar Sjúkrahús) and the Faroese Fishing Association (Faroese: Føroya Fiskamannafelag) for many years. Simonsen was elected to the Faroese Parliament as a representative from the Norðoyar district, serving from 1954 to 1966. He also served as a deputy for Finnbogi Ísakson from 1975 to 1978.
