= Skarvanes =

- Village
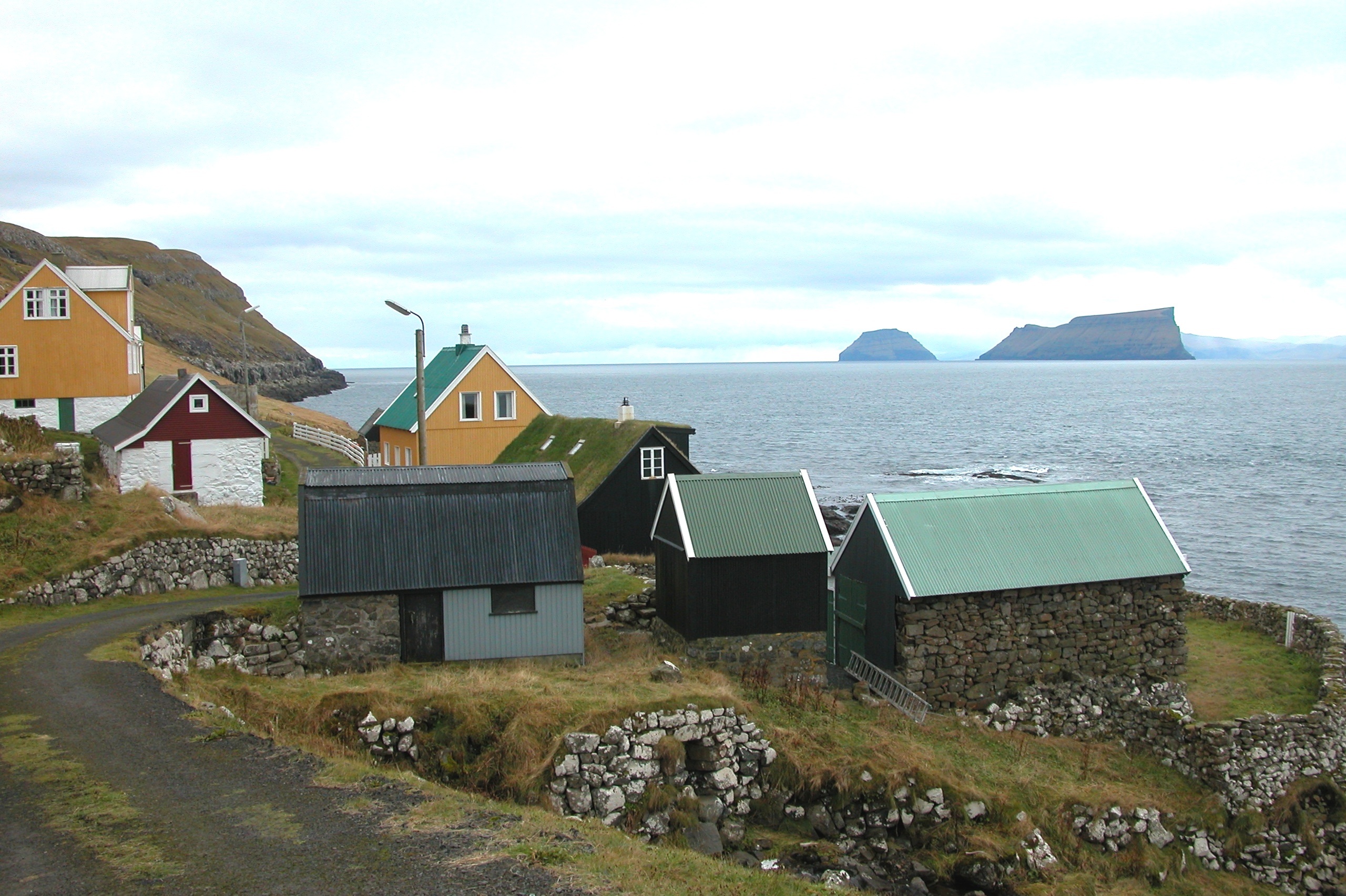
- Skarvanes, with the islands of Lítla Dímun and Stóra Dímun in the background

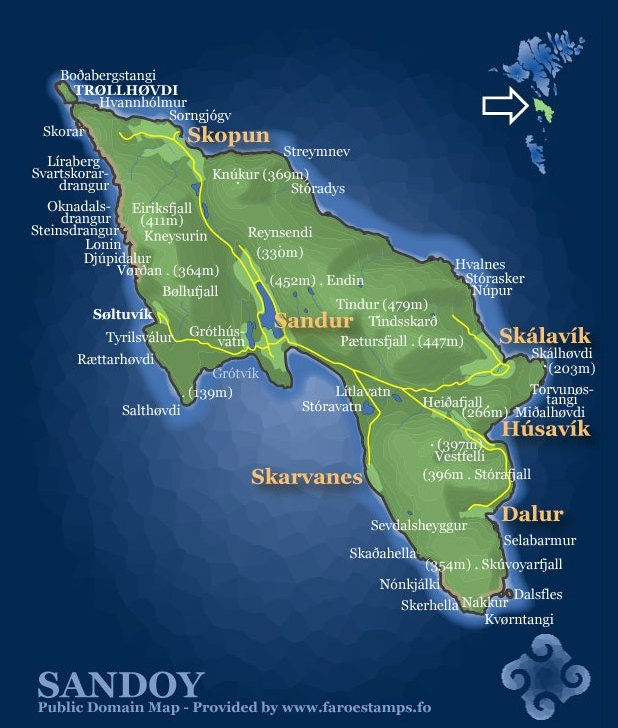
- Sandoy

- Location in the Faroe Islands
- Coordinates: 61°47′35″N 6°44′13″W
- State: Kingdom of Denmark
- Constituent country: Faroe Islands
- Island: Sandoy
- Municipality: Húsavík Municipality

Population (1 January 2013)
  - Total: 13
- Time zone: UTC+0 (GMT)
  - Summer (DST): UTC+1 (EST)
- Postal code: FO-236
- Climate: Cfc

Skarvanes (Danish: Skarvenæs; lit. 'cape of shags') is a village on Sandoy, in the Faroe Islands.

It temporarily became extinct in 2000 when its last permanent inhabitant died, though the population has since rebounded; as of 2013, the population is 13, with most of the houses being uses as holiday homes.
