= Georg L. Samuelsen =

- Born: January 8, 1910; Tórshavn, Faroe Islands
- Died: February 17, 1997 (aged 87); Tórshavn, Faroe Islands
- Occupation: Editor
- Political party: Union Party

Georg Lindenskov Samuelsen (January 8, 1910 – February 17, 1997) was a Faroese editor.

Samuelsen was born in Tórshavn, the son of Andrass Samuelsen and Beate Emilie Lindenskov. He was the brother of Trygvi Samuelsen, and the father of Lisbeth L. Petersen and Beate L. Samuelsen.

He served as the editor of the newspaper Dimmalætting from 1936 to 1981—that is, from the age of 26 until he retired. In 1945 he also became a special correspondent for the newspaper Berlingske Tidende. Samuelsen co-founded the Aid Association for Needy Fishermen (Danish: Nødstedte Fiskeres Hjælpefond) in 1936 and became its director in 1953. He became a member of the Faroese Accident Insurance Council (Danish: Færøernes Ulykkesforsikringsråd) from 1954 to 1964 and again from 1968 onward, was head of the Útvarpsnevndin, the broadcasting council for Faroese Radio (Faroese: Útvarp Føroya) from 1959 to 1964 and again from 1968 onward, and was head of the Tórshavn Theater (Faroese: Sjónleikarhúsið) from 1952 to 1967.

During this time, Samuelsen was active in the Tórshavn Theater Society (Faroese: Havnar Sjónleikarfelag) and he participated in a number of radio dramas with Faroese Radio throughout the years. He also translated several radio dramas into Faroese.

Samuelson became an honorary member of the Union Party in 1970. He died in Tórshavn.

== Bibliography ==
- 1930: Sól og sirm (Sun and Mist), poetry collection
