= Eilif Samuelsen =

Faroese teacher and politician

Member of the Parliament of the Faroe Islands from South Streymoy
- In office 1978–1990
- Prime Minister: Pauli Ellefsen

Minister of education
- In office 1981–1985
- Prime Minister: Pauli Ellefsen

Minister of social affairs
- In office 1981–1985
- Prime Minister: Pauli Ellefsen

Minister of energy
- In office 1981–1985
- Prime Minister: Pauli Ellefsen

Minister of the environment
- In office 1994–1998
- Prime Minister: Edmund Joensen

Minister of energy
- In office 1994–1998
- Prime Minister: Edmund Joensen

Minister of schools
- In office 1994–1998
- Prime Minister: Edmund Joensen

Minister of local government
- In office 1994–1998
- Prime Minister: Edmund Joensen

Mayor of the Municipality of Hvalvík
- In office 1963–1965

Chair of the Faroese Teachers' Association
- In office 1969–1980

Chair of the Tórshavn Music School
- In office 1988–1998

Head of the Education Council
- In office 1986–1994

Head of the National Cultural Foundation
- In office 1998–2000

Personal details
- Born: Torben Eilif Lindenskov Samuelsen; May 22, 1934 (age 91) Fuglafjørður, Faroe Islands
- Party: Union

Torben Eilif Lindenskov Samuelsen (born May 22, 1934) is a former Faroese teacher and politician for the Faroese Union Party.

Samuelsen was born in Fuglafjørður. He graduated as a teacher from the Haslev Normal School in 1958 and began his career by teaching in Fuglafjørður, Hvalvík, and Tórshavn. He served as mayor of the Municipality of Hvalvík from 1963 to 1965. Samuelsen was the chair of the Faroese Teachers' Association from 1969 to 1980, the chair of the Tórshavn Music School from 1988 to 1998, and the head of the Education Council (Faroese: Landsskúlaráðið) and head of the National Cultural Foundation (Faroese: Mentanargrunnur Føroya) from 1986 to 1994 and from 1998 to 2000.

He served in the Faroese Parliament as a representative from the South Streymoy (Faroese: Suðurstreymoy) district from 1978 to 1990. He served as minister of education, social affairs, and energy under Pauli Ellefsen from 1981 to 1985, and as minister of the environment, energy, schools, and local government in the first and second administrations of Edmund Joensen from 1994 to 1998.

Samuelsen is the grandson of Andrass Samuelsen, the nephew of Trygvi Samuelsen and Georg L. Samuelsen, and the cousin of Lisbeth L. Petersen and Beate L. Samuelsen.
