= Húsavík Municipality =

Húsavík Municipality Húsavíkar kommuna (Faroese)
- Coordinates: 61.810556°N 6.676389°W
- State: Kingdom of Denmark
- Constituent country: Faroe Islands
- Islands: Sandoy

Area
  - Total: 26 km^{2} (10 sq mi)

Population (2015)
  - Total: 117
  - Density: 4.5/km^{2} (12/sq mi)
- Website: www.visitsandoy.fo

Húsavík Municipality (Faroese: Húsavíkar kommuna) is a municipality of the Faroe Islands. The town of Húsavík is the administrative centre.

Its area comprises the southeastern quarter of the island of Sandoy.

It contains the following towns and villages:

- Húsavík
- Skarvanes
- Dalur
