= Lisbeth L. Petersen =

Faroese politician (1939–2024)

- Born: 28 February 1939; Tórshavn, Faroe Islands
- Died: 7 August 2024 (aged 85); Tórshavn, Faroe Islands
- Occupation: Lawyer
- Title: Leader of the Union Party
- Term: 2001–2004
- Predecessor: Edmund Joensen
- Successor: Kaj Leo Johannesen
- Political party: Union Party

Lisbeth Beate Lindenskov Petersen (28 February 1939 – 7 August 2024) was a Faroese politician in the Union Party. She was one of the first women to reach a top position in Faroese politics. Petersen served as mayor of the capital, Tórshavn, from 1992 to 1996 and was the first female mayor of Tórshavn. She was a member of the Faroese Parliament from 1990 to 2008, she was the first Faroese woman who was elected to the Danish Parliament, she was a member of the Danish Parliament from 2001 to 2005. From 2001 to 2004 she was parliamentary leader and head of her party.

== Background ==
Petersen was born in Tórshavn. She was the daughter of the editor Georg L. Samuelsen, the sister of the journalist Beate L. Samuelsen, the granddaughter of Prime Minister Andrass Samuelsen, and the niece of the lawyer Trygvi Samuelsen. She came from an influential family that owned most of the newspaper Dimmalætting. She was the largest single shareholder when the family sold its shares in 2010. Her son Georg L. Petersen is the current editor-in-chief of Dimmalætting. Her grandfather and uncle were also leaders of the Union Party.

After completing high school in Tórshavn, Petersen passed the entrance exam in 1958 to study at Bagsværd Boarding School and High School in Denmark. Her father advised her against pursuing a career in journalism, and she started as a sales assistant in a dry good store. In 1959 she started studying at Copenhagen Business School, but then broke off her studies and returned to the Faroe Islands, where she married the engineer Jákup Petersen from Signabøur in 1960. Over the next ten years, she alternated between being a housewife and working part-time at law offices in Tórshavn while her husband was abroad. Petersen served as the project secretary for the National Museum of the Faroe Islands from 1980 to 1992, and as party secretary for the Union Party from 1982 to 1987.

Petersen died in Tórshavn on 7 August 2024, at the age of 85.

== Political work ==
Petersen joined local party organization of the Union Party in Tórshavn early in her career. In the 1970s, greater gender equality was achieved. In 1984, Petersen ran for office for the first time, and was elected a member of the Tórshavn municipal council. She was the first-ever elected female representative for the Union Party, and during the post-election negotiations she was offered the position of mayor. Petersen preferred to serve as deputy mayor and chair of the social committee. After the elections in 1992, she yielded to pressure from her political supporters and became Tórshavn's first female mayor. The Union Party had its best-ever showing in the local elections of 1996, but Petersen did not take a leading position between 1997 and 2000, after which she withdrew from local politics.

Petersen served in the Faroese Parliament as a representative from the South Streymoy (Faroese: Suðurstreymoy) district from 1990 to 2008. During her first term she was mostly engaged in transport, justice, social, and health issues, and she later sat on the Faroese Parliament's financial committee. She was especially engaged in cooperation with Iceland and Greenland, and was a member of the Faroese Parliament's delegation to the West Nordic Council (formerly the West Nordic Parliamentarian Council of Cooperation) from 1990 to 2002, serving as the council's president from 1993 to 1994 and from 1996 to 1997. She played a central role in the Union Party following the party's 1994 election victory during the Faroese financial crisis and advanced to head of the party and parliamentary leader from 2001 to 2004. She apparently had the chance to become prime minister in 1994, but the position went to Edmund Joensen.

Petersen served in the Danish Parliament as a representative from the Faroes from 2001 to 2005 and joined the Venstre party's group in the parliament. On 8 March 2007 (International Women's Day), Petersen announced that she would withdraw from politics. In 2014 she resigned from the Union Party in protest against the political orientation of Kaj Leo Johannesen's government.
