= Trygvi Samuelsen =

Faroese lawyer and politician

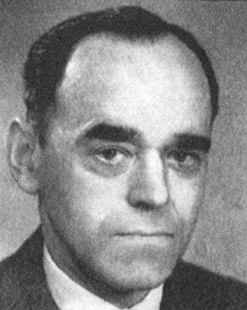
- Born: September 16, 1907; Fuglafjørður, Faroe Islands
- Died: February 19, 1985 (aged 77); Tórshavn, Faroe Islands
- Occupation: Lawyer
- Title: Leader of the Union Party
- Term: 1970–1974
- Predecessor: Johan Poulsen
- Successor: Pauli Ellefsen
- Political party: Union Party

Samuel Georg Trygve Samuelsen (September 16, 1907 – February 19, 1985) was a Faroese lawyer and politician in the Faroese Union Party.

== Life ==
Samuelsen was born in Fuglafjørður i 1907, the son of Andrass Samuelsen and Beate Emilie Lindenskov. He was also the brother of Georg L. Samuelsen and the uncle of Lisbeth L. Petersen. Although he was baptized Samuel Georg Trygve Samuelsen, he was known by the more Faroese name Trygvi Samuelsen. He received his examen artium degree at Sorø Academy in 1926, and his candidate of law degree in 1933. Samuelsen became a local administrator (sysselmann) for Eysturoy in 1933, a proxy solicitor in Tórshavn in 1934, and a lawyer in the same town in 1938. In 1956 he became the Icelandic consul for the Faroe Islands.

From 1936 to 1964, Samuelsen served as governor of the Municipality of Tórshavn. He served as a member of the Union Party in the Faroese Parliament from 1943 to 1946 and from 1949 to 1974, representing the South Streymoy (Faroese: Suðurstreymoy) district. He succeeded Johan Poulsen to serve as head of the party from 1970 to 1974, after which Pauli Ellefsen took over leadership of the party.

Trygvi Samuelsen died in Tórshavn.
