= Betri =

- Village
- Location in Bihar, India Betri (India)
- Coordinates: 25.04325°N 83.56781°E
- Country: India
- State: Bihar
- District: Kaimur

Area
  - Total: 4.08 km^{2} (1.58 sq mi)
- Elevation: 89 m (292 ft)

Population (2011)
  - Total: 4,377
  - Density: 1,070/km^{2} (2,780/sq mi)

Languages
  - Official: Bhojpuri, Hindi
- Time zone: UTC+5:30 (IST)

Betri is a village in Bhabua block of Kaimur district, Bihar, India. As of 2011, its population was 4,377, in 811 households.
