= Húsavík, Faroe Islands =

Húsavík Husevig
- Village
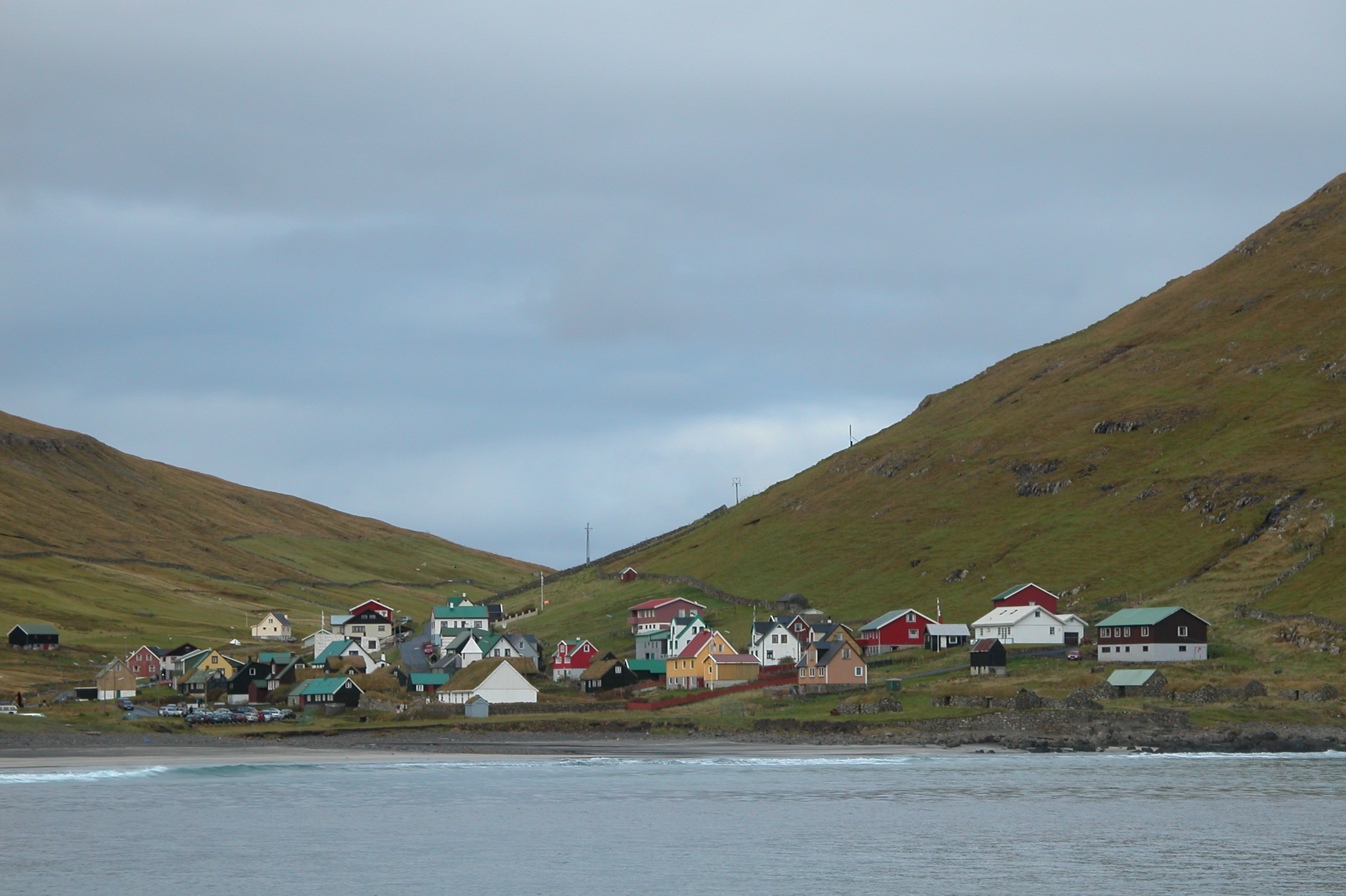
- Húsavík, Faroe Islands.

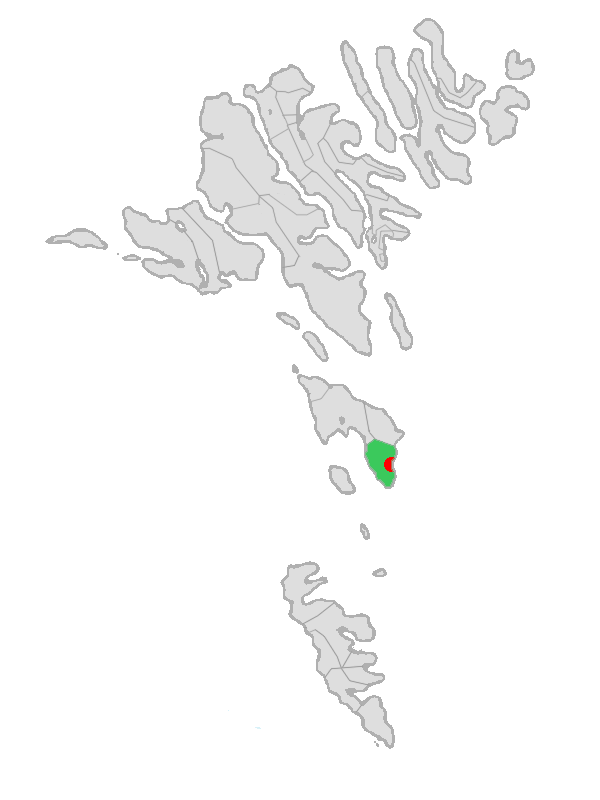
- Location of Húsavík within Húsavík municipality in the Faroe Islands

- Location of Húsavík village in the Faroe Islands
- Coordinates: 61°48′38″N 6°40′35″W
- State: Kingdom of Denmark
- Constituent country: Faroe Islands
- Island: Sandoy
- Municipality: Húsavík

Population (September 2025)
  - Total: 65
- Time zone: GMT
  - Summer (DST): UTC+1 (WEST)
- Postal code: FO 230
- Climate: Cfc

Húsavík (Danish: Husevig) is an old village located on the east of the island of Sandoy, in Húsavík Municipality, Faroe Islands.

In the centre of Húsavík there is a ruin called ‘Heimi á Garði’. It is said to be the remains of a farm that was built by the 'Lady of the House in Húsavík'. She was a strict and wealthy lady who lived in the 14th century. She owned all the land in Húsavík and also had some properties in Norway. Legend has it that she buried two servants alive. It is also said that she got all her wealth when she sold a golden horn to the King. The story goes that she found the golden horn in the ground, after dreaming of its location.

== Image gallery ==
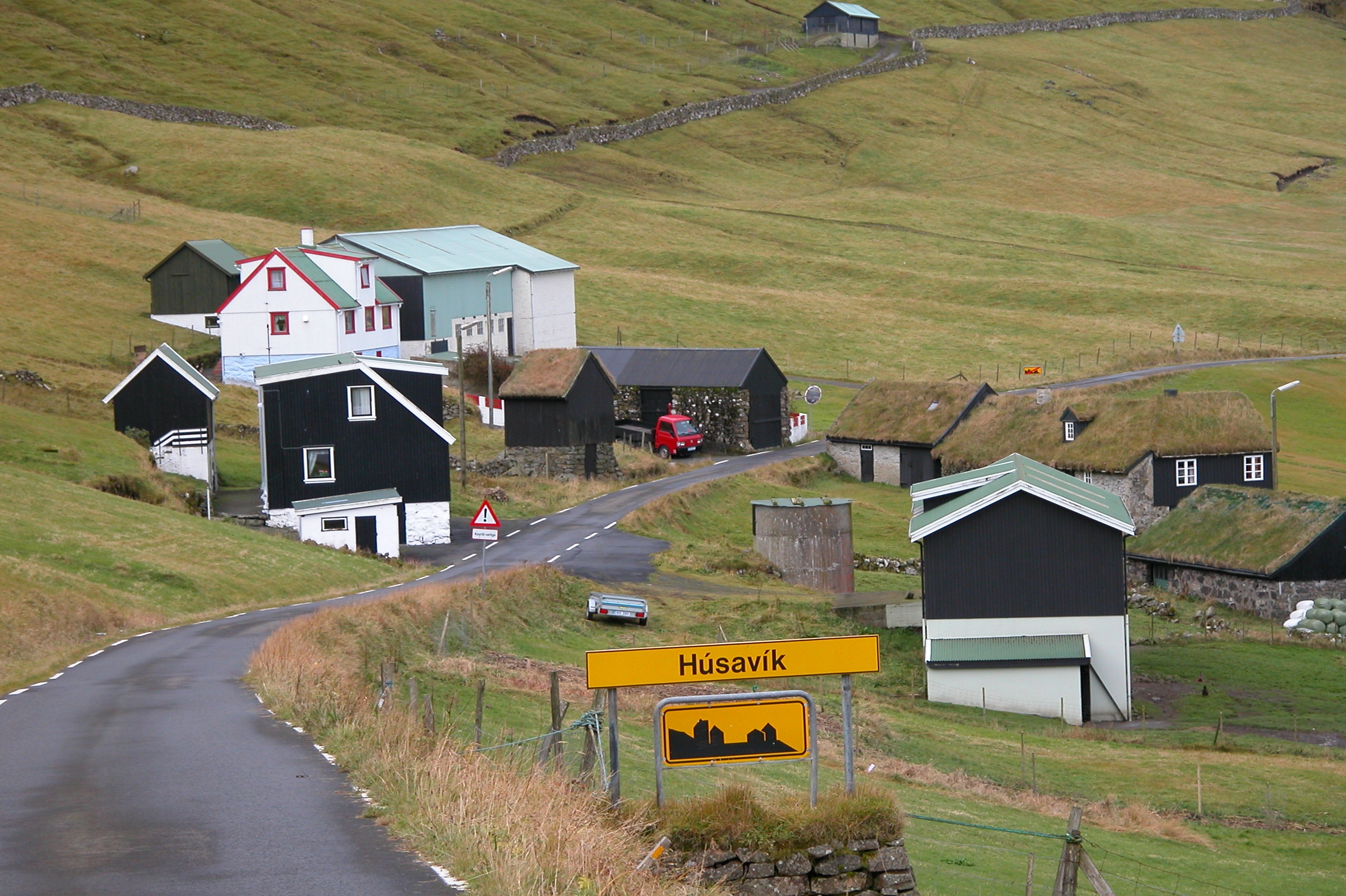
Húsavík, Faroe Islands.

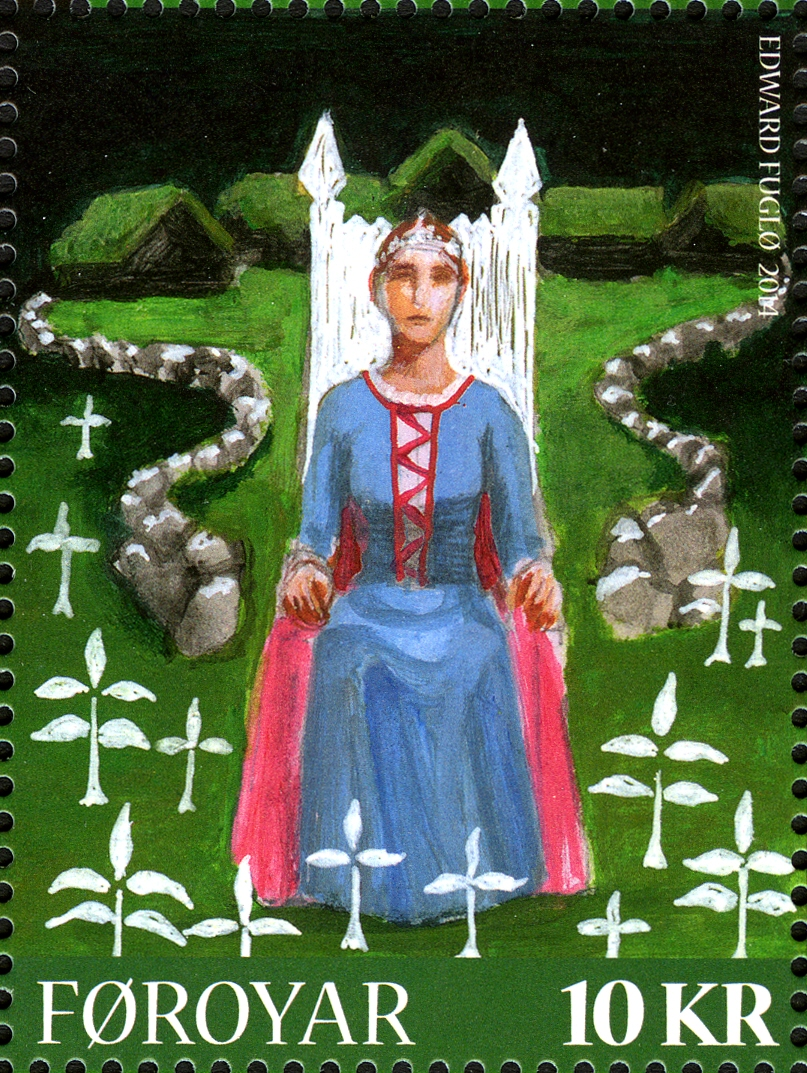
Stamp showing the 'Lady of Húsavík'.

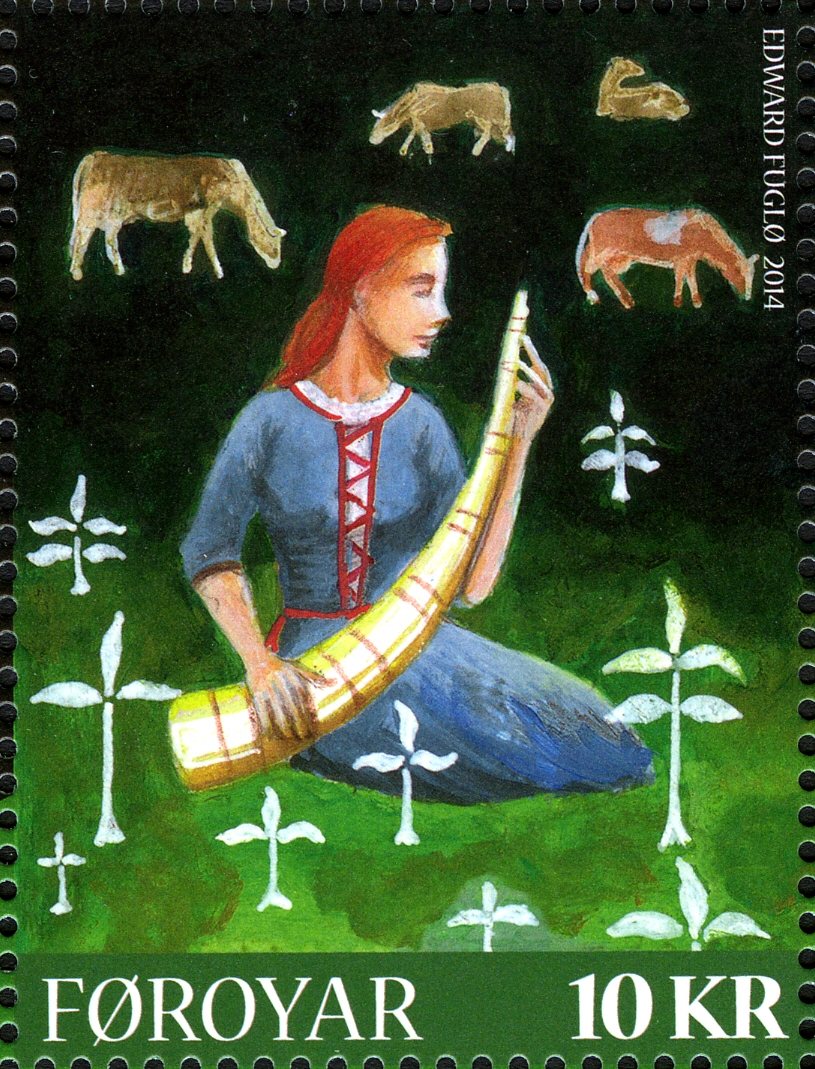
The golden horn.
(Faroese stamp from 2014)

== See also ==
- List of towns in the Faroe Islands
