= Jóngerð Purkhús =

Faroese politician

Jóngerð Jensina Purkhús (born 1937) is a Faroese politician and feminist who has been an active member of the Republic Party. She became the first female minister in the Faroe Islands when she was appointed Minister of Finance, Economy and the Environment in 1985. In 1989, she was appointed Minister of the Economy, Social Affairs and the Judiciary, serving until 1991.

== Biography ==
Born in Klaksvik on 22 January 1937, Jóngerð Jensina Purkhús is the daughter of Jacob Pauli Purkhús (1908–90), a fisherman, and his wife Else Johanne Hansen (born 1912). Her family were not academically inclined but they were politically attached to the social and political ambitions of the Republic Party which sought independence from Denmark. Klasvik was also the centre of strikes leading to clashes with the Danish authorities. This no doubt led to Purkhús' interest in nationalism and her decision to study political science.

She completed her school education in 1953, without matriculating. After working for a few years in Klasvik, she moved to Copenhagen in 1960 where she worked at a grocer's during the day and attended the Akademisk Studenterkursus (Academic Student Course) in the evenings. She then succeeded in passing the matriculation examination which allowed her to start reading political science at the University of Copenhagen while working at the Social Research Institute and as a medical assistant for the elderly. In 1972, she became the first Faroese to graduate as a Cand.polit. After working for an accounting firm, she returned to the Faroes in 1975 taking up a governmental post where she oversaw the transfer of the Danish postal service to a Faroese entity. Thereafter she worked in the postal service's administration managing accounting and transfer arrangements. From 1978, she returned to a government posting where she dealt with financial legislation.

On the electoral front, she first stood as a candidate for Klaksvik in 1978. In the 1984 elections, she was one of three women who were elected to the Løgting, all of whom were elected as top candidates for their parties. For the Republic party, Purkhús received 620 votes and Karin Kjølbro 504, while for the Social Democrats, Marita Petersen received 385. In 1985, in the coalition with the Social Democrats, the New Self-Government and the People's Party, Purkhús was appointed Minister of Finance and the Environment, becoming the first Faroese female minister. From 1988 to 1989, she was elected to the Løgting, representing the Republic party. In the new coalition in 1989 of the Republicans, the People's Party and the Union Party, she was Minister of the Economy, Social Affairs and the Judiciary until 1991. She remained in the Løgting for a number of years as a member of the Republic party before she withdrew from politics.

Since 1976, Purkhús has lived in Velbastaður where her interests are livestock, folk dancing and patchwork.
