= Finnbogi Ísakson =

Faroese politician (1943–2005)

Speaker of the Faroese Parliament
- In office 1998–2002
- Preceded by: Jógvan I. Olsen
- Succeeded by: Edmund Joensen

Finance Minister of the Faroe Islands
- In office 1993–1994
- Preceded by: Jógvan Sundstein
- Succeeded by: Jóannes Eidesgaard

Finance Minister of the Faroe Islands
- In office January–June 1989
- Preceded by: Jóngerð Purkhús
- Succeeded by: Ivan Johannesen

Education, Housing, and Transport Minister of the Faroe Islands
- In office 1975–1979
- Preceded by: Asbjørn Joensen; Jacob Lindenskov (Housing)
- Succeeded by: Hergeir Nielsen; Jacob Lindenskov (housing)

Personal details
- Born: February 7, 1943 Klaksvík, Faroe Islands
- Died: September 7, 2005 (aged 62) Tórshavn, Faroe Islands
- Party: Republic
- Occupation: Journalist

Finnbogi Ísakson (born Isaksen, February 7, 1943 – September 7, 2005) was a Faroese journalist, writer, and politician for the Republic party.

== Life and career ==
Ísakson was born in Klaksvík, the son of the fishing captain Jógvan Isaksen (died 1948) and his wife Anna née Wolles (died 1971). His involvement in media included radio, television, and newspapers. He served as a member of the Faroese Parliament from 1966 to 1984 and from 1990 to 2002, and he was a member of the Cabinet of the Faroe Islands from 1975 to 1979, in 1989, and again from 1993 to 1994.

Ísakson worked at Faroese Radio (Faroese: Útvarp Føroya) from 1963 to 1974. He was the second-youngest person ever elected to the Faroese Parliament, at the age of 23 in 1966 as a representative for the Norðoyar district. He later served as the editor of the newspaper Tíðindablaðið from 1974 to 1975. Ísakson worked freelance from 1975 to 1984, overlapping with his term as minister of education, housing, and transport in Atli Dam's second administration from 1975 to 1979. During this time, Johan Simonsen served as Ísakson's deputy in the parliament. In 1984, Ísakson was reelected to the parliament. That same year he was also hired by Faroese Television (Faroese: Sjónvarp Føroya), where he worked until 1988. Ísakson served as a deputy for Jóngerð Purkhús in the parliament from 1989 to 1990. Ísakson was once again elected to the parliament in 1990 as a representative for the South Streymoy district in 1990. He served as the minister of finance in 1989, and then again from 1993 to 1994. He was editor of 14. september, the paper of the Republic party, from 1991 to 1993. From 1998 to 2002 he was speaker of the Faroese Parliament, but he did not run as a candidate after this.

Finnbogi Ísakson became seriously ill in the summer of 2005, and he died in Tórshavn on September 7 that year at the age of 62.

== Parliamentary committees ==
- 1994–1998: member of the Finance Committee
- 1994–1998: member of the Tax Committee
- 1990–1993: member of the Finance Committee
- 1974–1975: member of the Tax Committee
- 1972–1974: member of the Finance Committee
- 1969–1970: member of the Ports and Roads Committee
- 1966–1969: member of the Social Committee
- 1966–1970: member of the Schools Committee

== Selected works ==
- 1972: Rím og reyp, humor
- 1983: Tilburðir í okkara øld, vol. 1
- 1987: Tilburðir í okkara øld, vol. 2
- 1988: Aftur og fram, vol. 1
- 1989: Aftur og fram, vol. 2
- 1990: Aftur og fram, vol. 3
- 1991: Aftur og fram, vol. 4
- 1995: Tilburðir í okkara øld, vol. 3
- 2005: Sverri kongur, translated from Norwegian
