= Jona Henriksen =

Faroese politician (1924–2006)

Jona Elisabeth Frida Henriksen
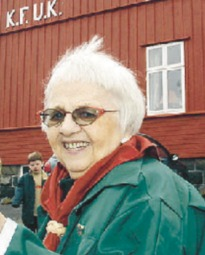
- Born: 1924 January 4 Tórshavn
- Died: 2006 September 4
- Occupation: Secretary

Jona Elisabeth Frida Henriksen (4 January 1924 – 4 September 2006) was a Faroese politician and feminist who was active in the Social Democratic Party. After serving as the deputy mayor of Tórshavn in 1970, in 1975, she was one of the first two women to be elected to the Løgting, the Faroese parliament.

== Biography ==
Born on 4 April 1924 in Tórshavn, Jona Elisabeth Frida Henriksen is the daughter of the politician Johan Pauli Andreas Henriksen (1902–80) and his wife Elisabeth Mouritsen. As her father was an active trades unionist and her mother was the founder of the Faroese national youth movement, she was introduced to politics from an early age. After matriculating from secondary school in 1946, she worked at the Føroya Banki until 1967 when was appointed secretary of the KFUK (Young Women's Christian Association).

After becoming an early member of the Faroese Social Democratic Electoral Association, she was the first women to serve on the board from 1954 to 1965. From 1968, she was a member of the Torshavn City Council where she accumulated a range of responsibilities. In 1970, she served as deputy mayor under Peter F. Christiansen.

In 1978, together with Karin Kjølbro, she was one of the first two women to be elected to the Løgting, after serving as a substitute in 1975. She was not re-elected in 1980 but continued to serve as a substitute until 1988.

Henriksen died in September 2006 at the age of 82.

== See also ==
- Women in the Faroe Islands
