= Dimmalætting =

Newspaper of the Faroe Islands

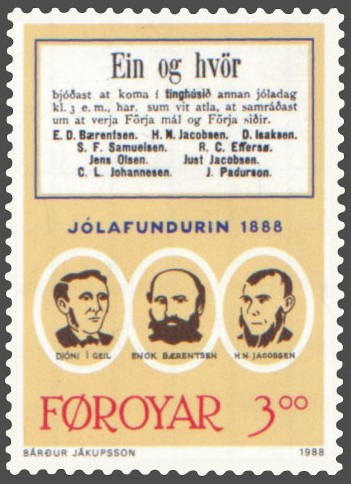

Dimmalætting (Faroese for 'Dawn') is the oldest and largest newspaper of the Faroe Islands and is based in Tórshavn.

The first edition of the Dimma, as it is commonly known, appeared (after a test issue on December 8, 1877) on January 5, 1878. As of 2005 it had a print run of 8,500 copies (in 1991 it was 13,300) and appeared five days weekly then, as of 2014 it appears once weekly, every Friday. As an answer to competing papers, the Wednesday edition is delivered free of charge to all households. Since April 5, 2005 one issue a week has been distributed to all households in the country free of charge.

Since the founding of the Unionist Party in 1906, Dimma was the party paper, but it has since declared itself independent in 1995.

The name Dimmalætting combines the word dimmi 'darkness' and lætting, from the verb lætta 'leave'. Dimmið lættir means 'it is becoming daytime', or literally, 'the darkness is dwindling'. The paper's name comes from Venceslaus Ulricus Hammershaimb, the very creator of the modern orthography of Faroese.

The Danish name for the paper was the Amtstidene for Færøerne (Official paper for the Faroese), and the Faroese name was printed in small letters. In its early years, the paper was only published in the Danish language. Then, from 1910 to 1947, it was printed in both languages, and in the years since 1947, Faroese has dominated. Today the entire paper is written in Faroese language.

Until 1911, when a Wednesday edition began, the paper only appeared on Saturdays. In the 1920s, the paper expanded to six pages from the previous four. After 1970, the page count rose to eight or more. A third edition was added, and from September 1996, it has appeared five times a week from Tuesday to Saturday. In November 2004, the days were changed to Monday to Friday. Since the middle of March 2005, it has appeared in tabloid format.

It was disbanded in 2013. Dimma.fo announced however in late 2014 that the paper had started again, but in a reduced rate with one weekly newspaper every Friday.
