= Sandoy =

- Island
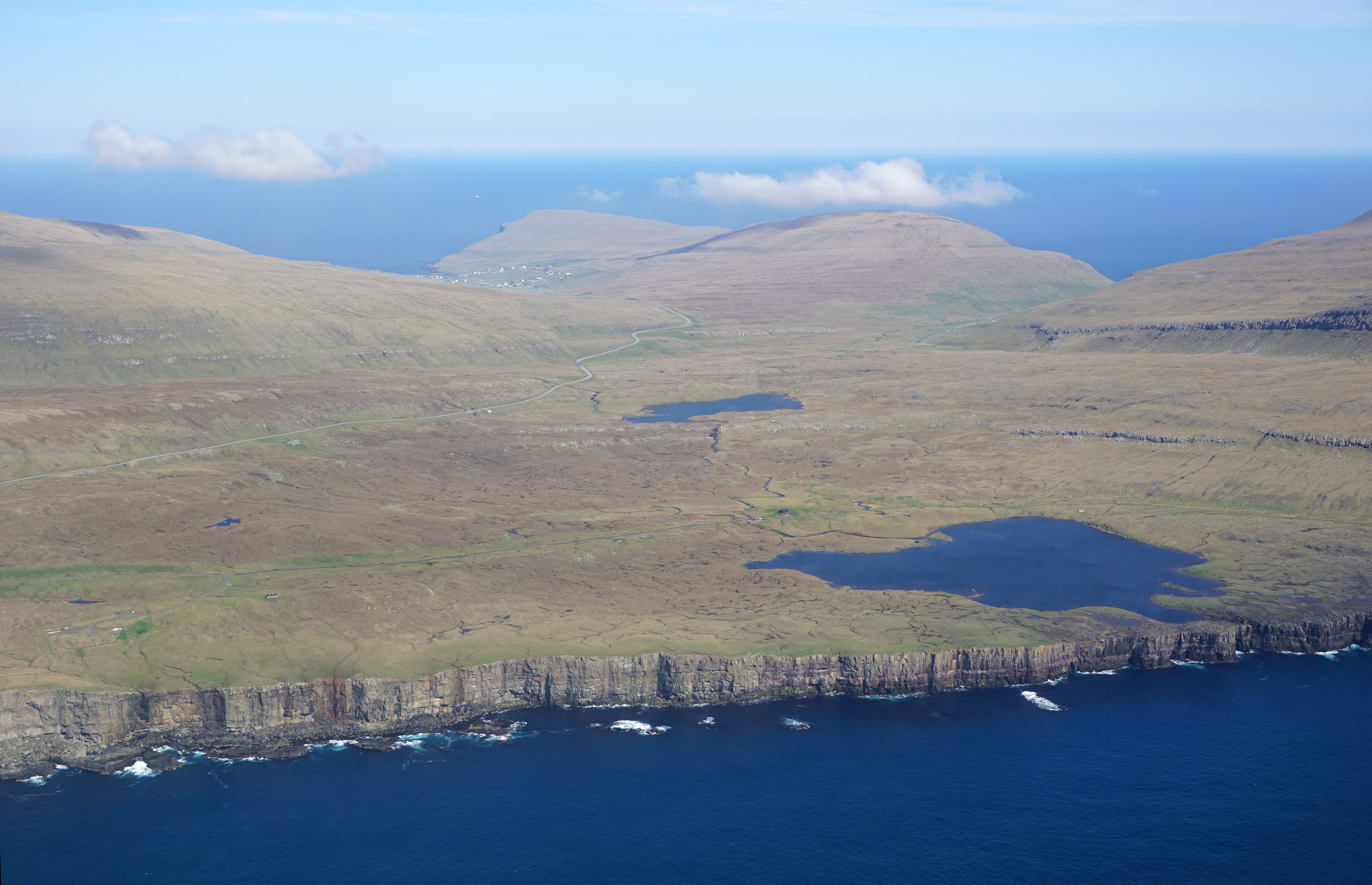
- Island of Sandoy seen from a helicopter.

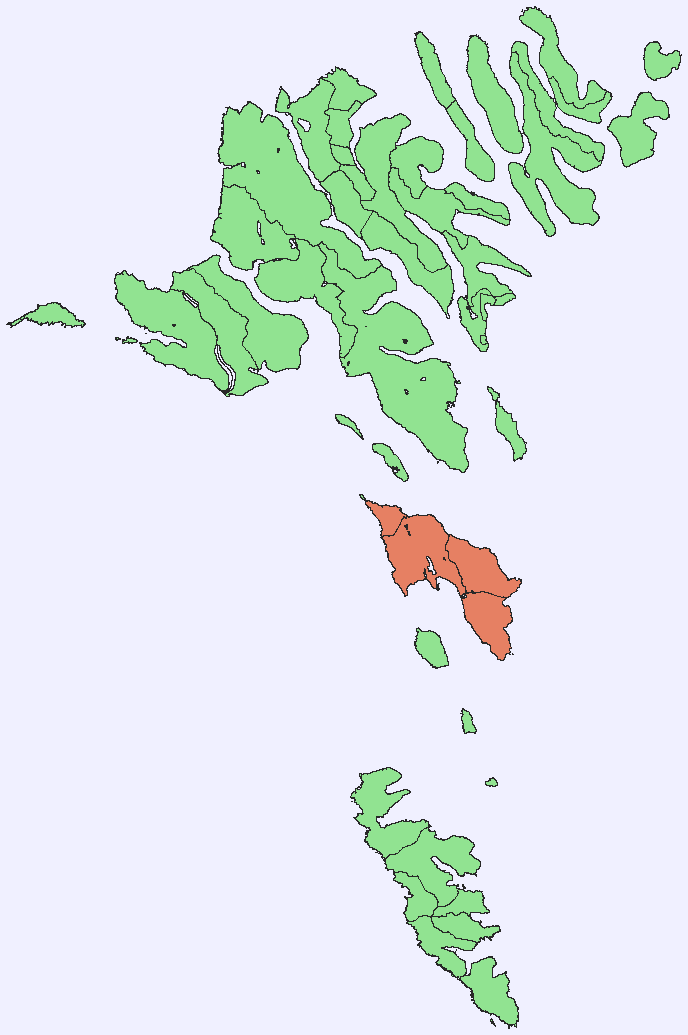
- Location within the Faroe Islands
- Coordinates: 61°51′N 6°47′W
- State: Kingdom of Denmark
- Autonomous country: Faroe Islands
- Region: Sandoy

Area
  - Total: 125 km^{2} (48 sq mi)

Population (01-2020)
  - Total: 1,231
  - Density: 9.85/km^{2} (25.5/sq mi)
- Time zone: UTC+0 (GMT)
  - Summer (DST): UTC+1 (EST)
- Calling code: 298

Sandoy (lit. "Sand Island" in Faroese) is the first of the five southern islands that make up the Faroe chain, the fifth largest of all the Faroe Islands, an autonomous region of the Kingdom of Denmark. It also refers to the region that includes this island along with Skúvoy and Stóra Dímun. As of January 2020, the largest settlement on the island is the village of Sandur, with a population of 532. Other settlements include Skarvanes, Skopun, Skálavík, Húsavík and Dalur.

The name Sandoy comes from the large beach in Sandur and the generally sandy soil of the island. It is the only island with dunes.

There are similarly named islands, Sanday in the Orkney Islands, Sanday in the Inner Hebrides and Sandøy in Norway.

== Agriculture ==
The island of Sandoy has rich, fertile soil.

On 19 August 2015 the agricultural union "Veltan" was founded for people with an interest in agricultural work; aiming to improve conditions for self-sustenance and supporting agricultural businesses.

The island supports 6,878 sheep, not including lambs. There are two grind beaches used for whaling, in Húsavík and Sandur.

== Important Bird Areas ==
The island's surrounding bird cliffs and steep slopes have been identified as an Important Bird Area (IBA) by BirdLife International due to their significance as a breeding site for seabirds, especially northern fulmars (50,000 pairs), Manx shearwaters (5000 pairs), European storm petrels (50,000 pairs), European shags (150 pairs), great skuas (15 pairs), Atlantic puffins (70,000 pairs) and black guillemots (400 pairs). An additional IBA on the island comprises the lowland areas around the village of Sandur, with their moorland and peat bogs, and the lakes Gróthúsvatn, Lítlavatn, Sandsvatn and Stóravatn, as they support 100-150 breeding pairs of Eurasian whimbrels.

== Transport and infrastructure ==
The Sandoyartunnilin connects between the centre of the island and Gamlarætt on Streymoy. Construction started in 2019 and the tunnel opened for traffic on 21 December 2023.

The proposed Suðuroyartunnilin would connect the island with Skúvoy and Suðuroy, replacing the ferry MS Smyril.

== See also ==
- List of islands of the Faroe Islands

== Gallery ==
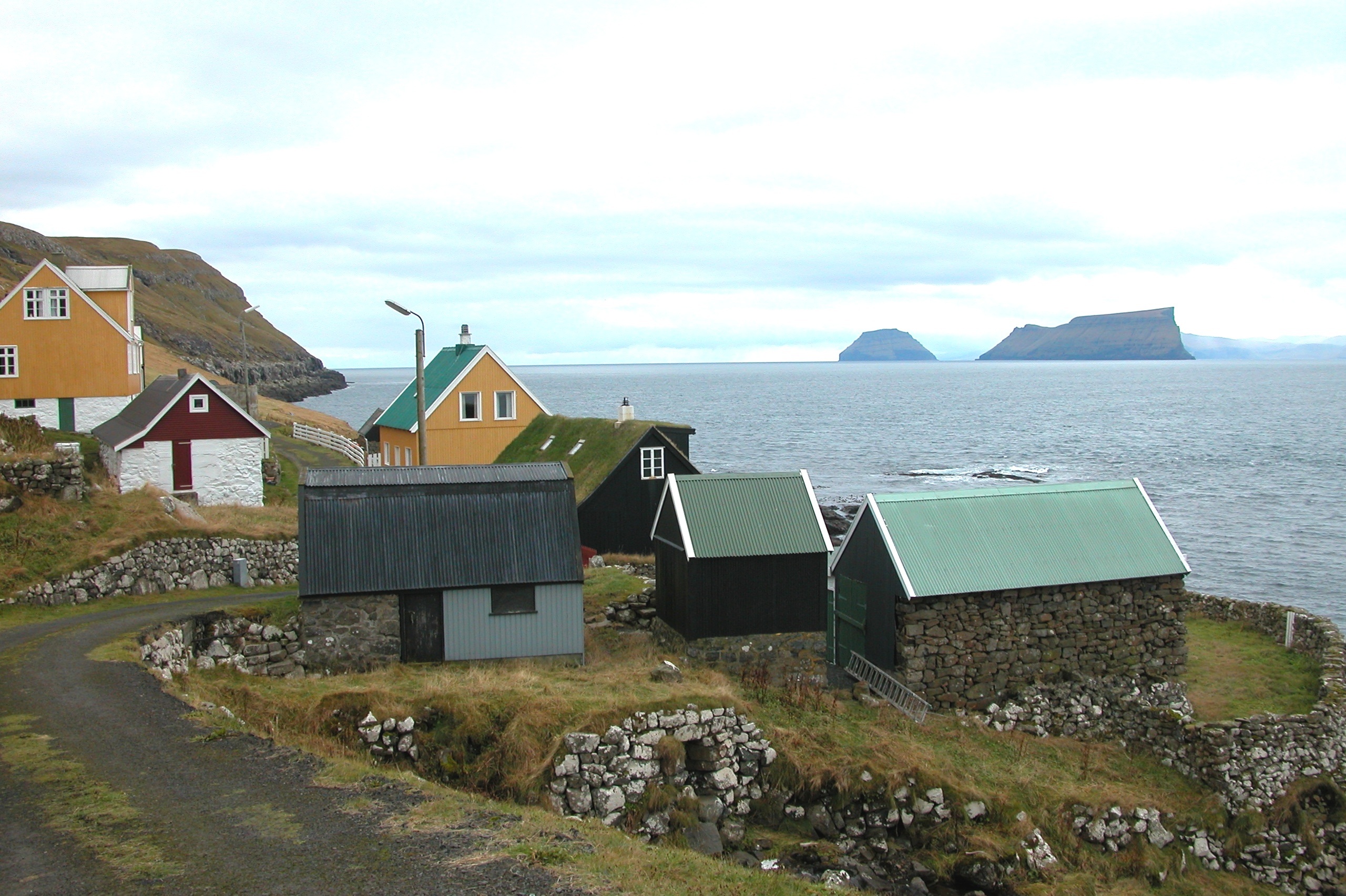
Skarvanes

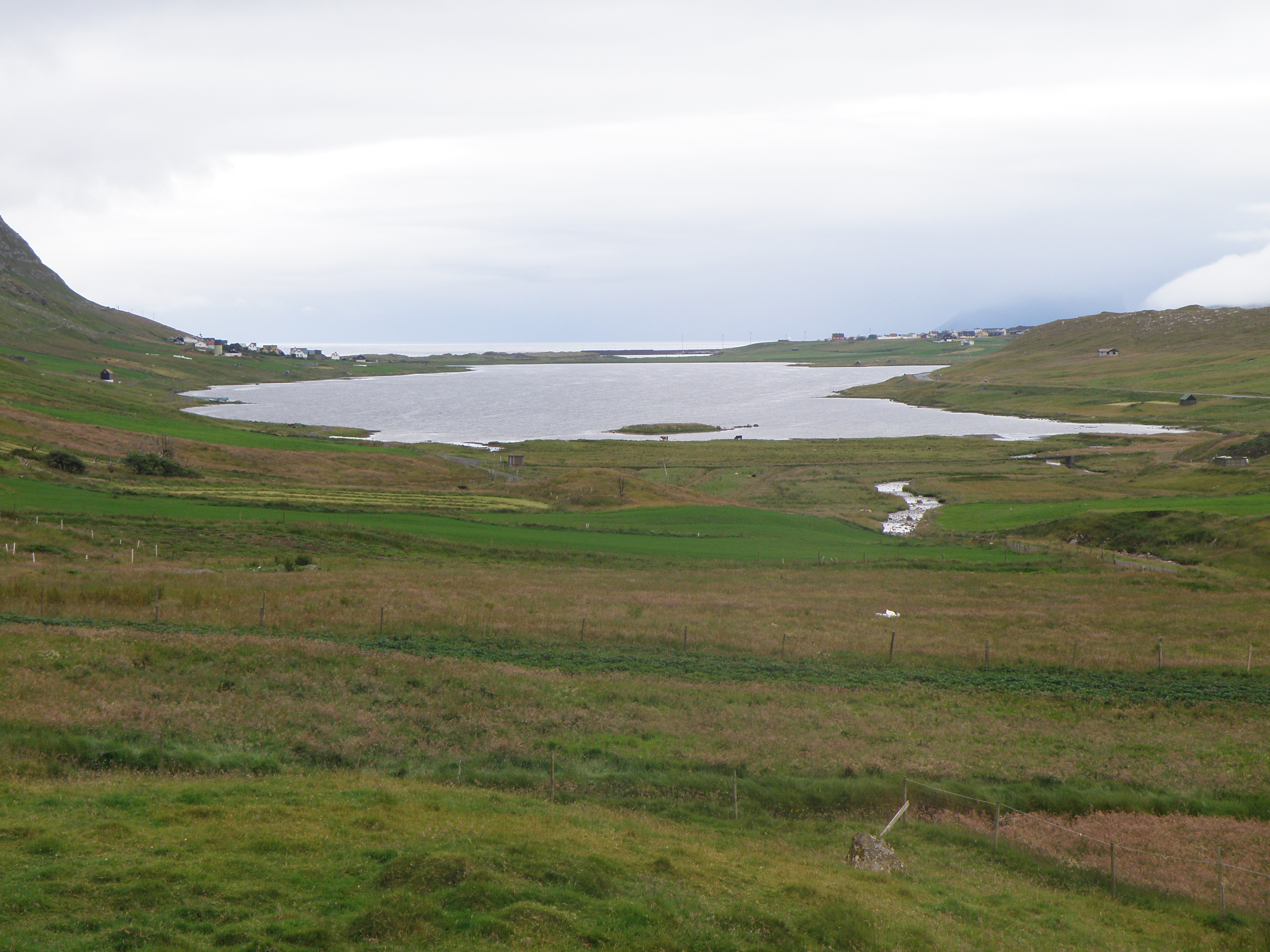
The lake Sandsvatn is the largest on the island and the third largest in the Faroe Islands.

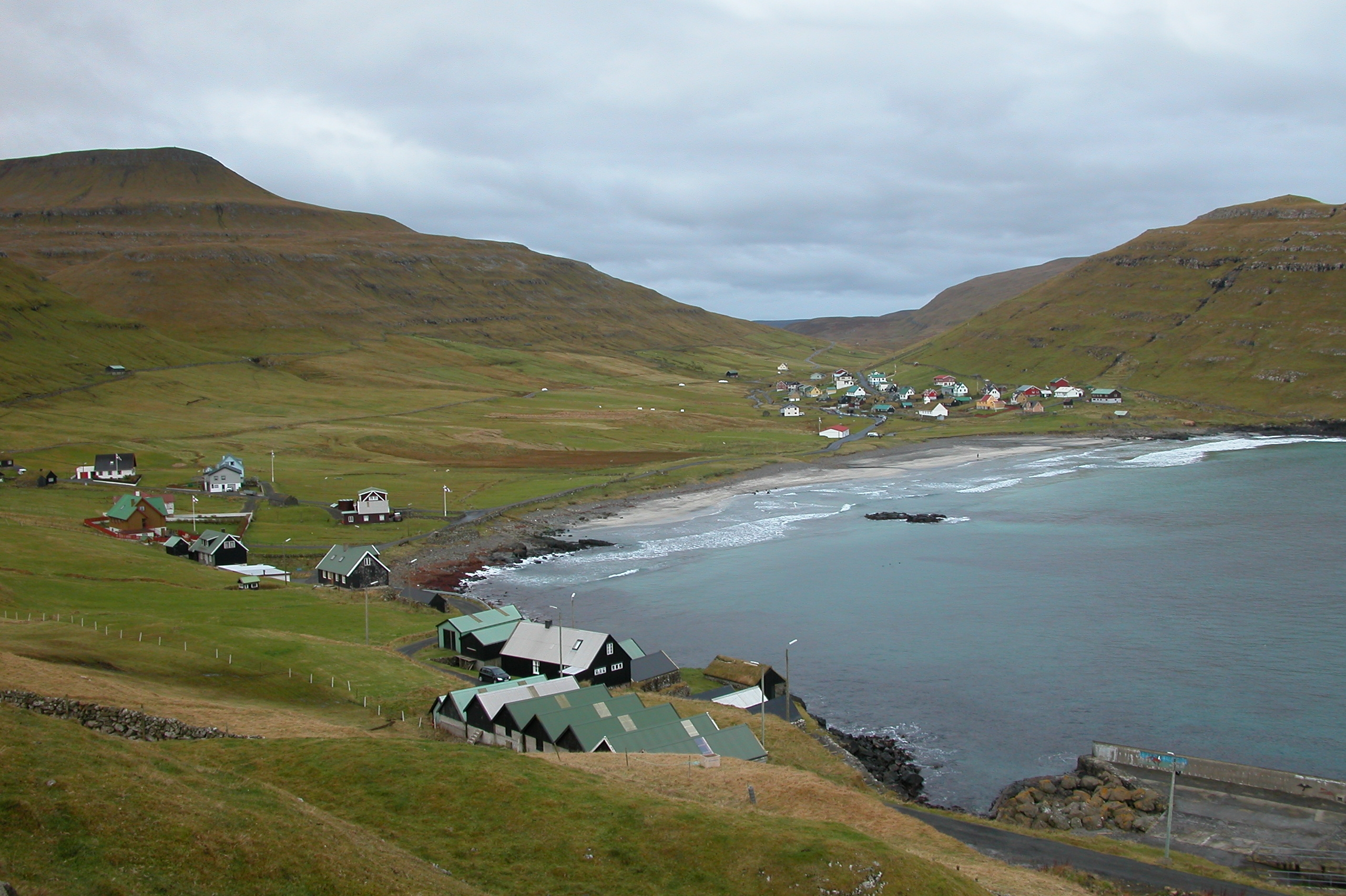
Húsavík, Faroe Islands

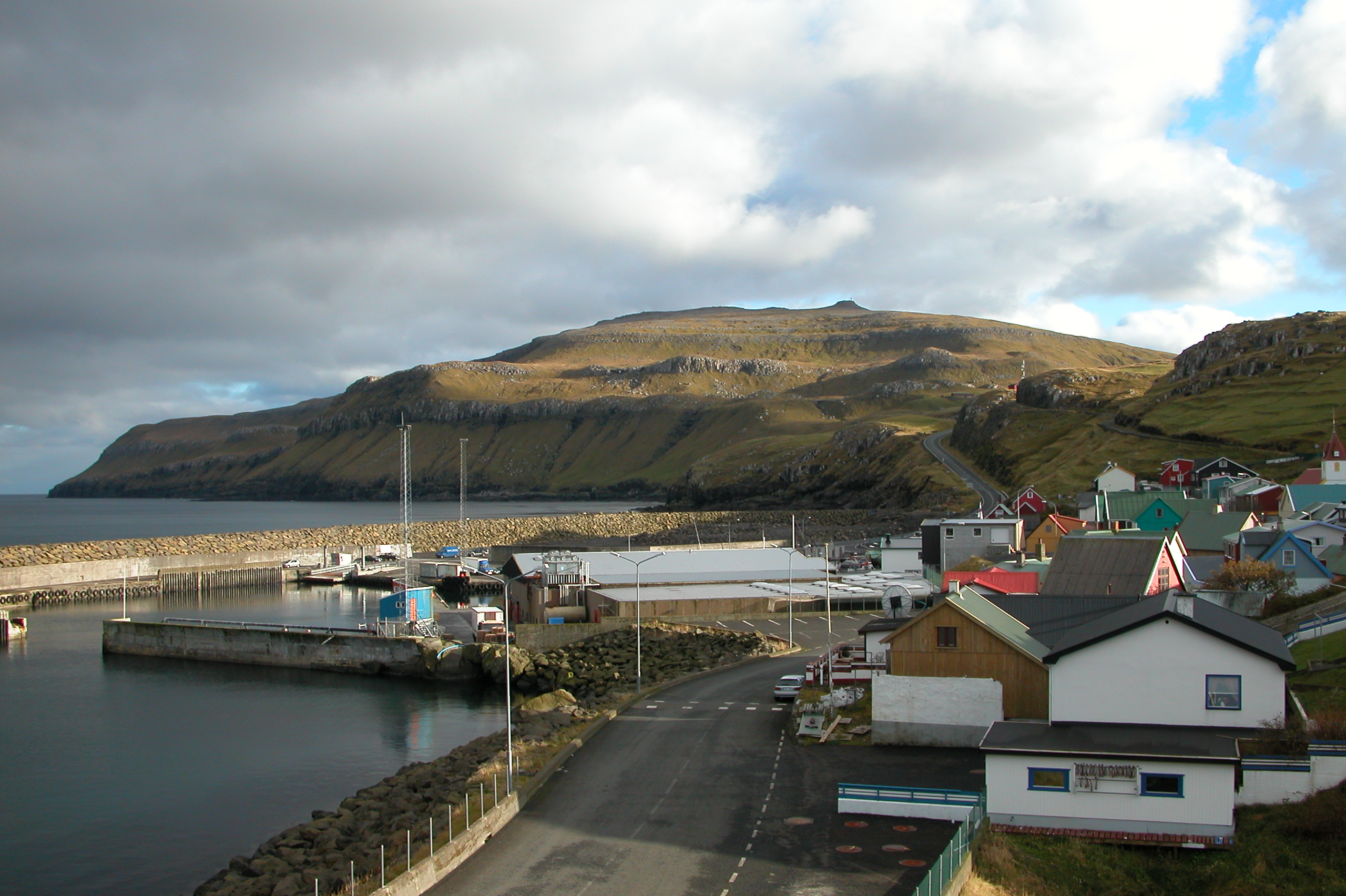
Skopun

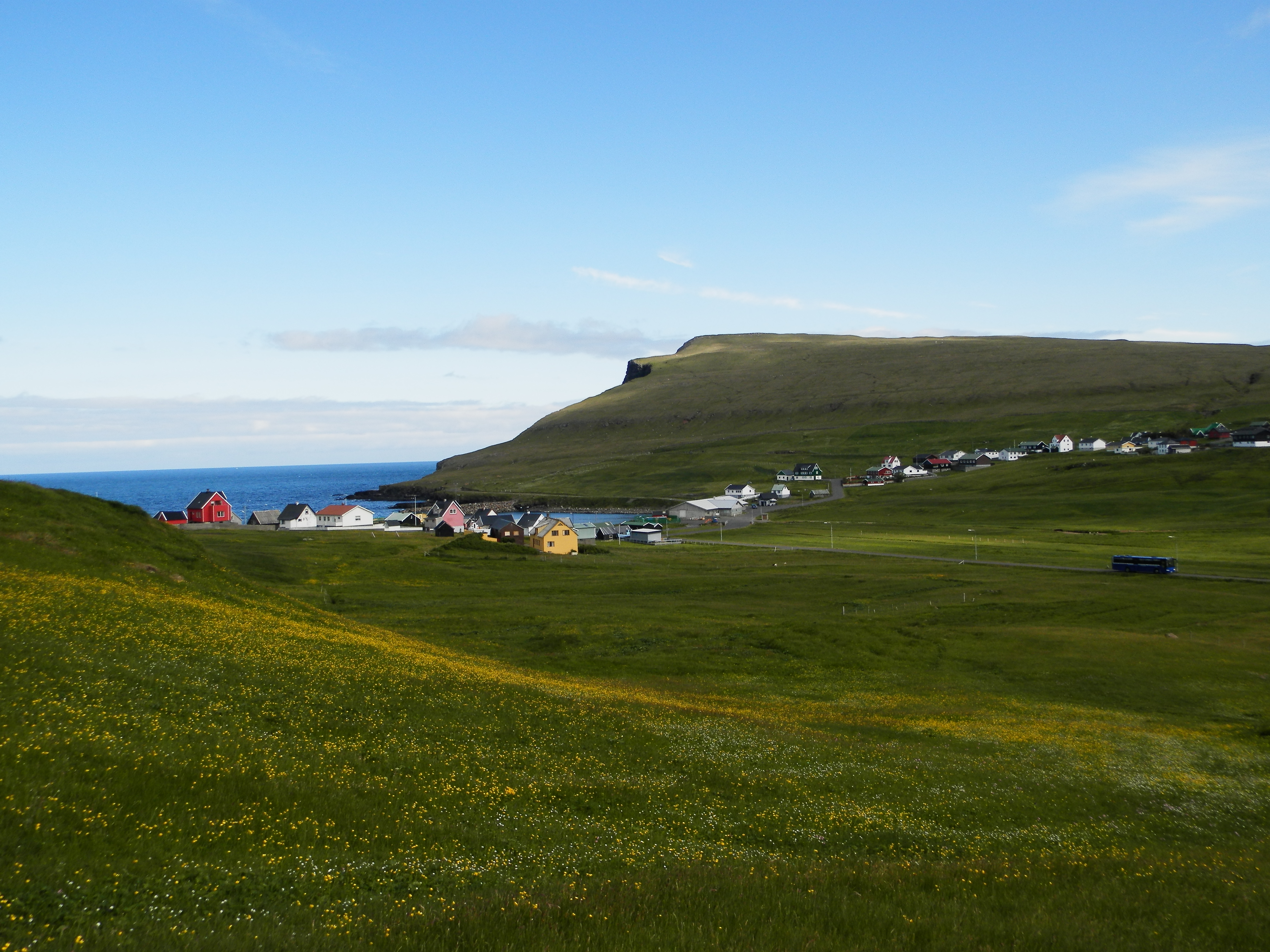
Skálavík

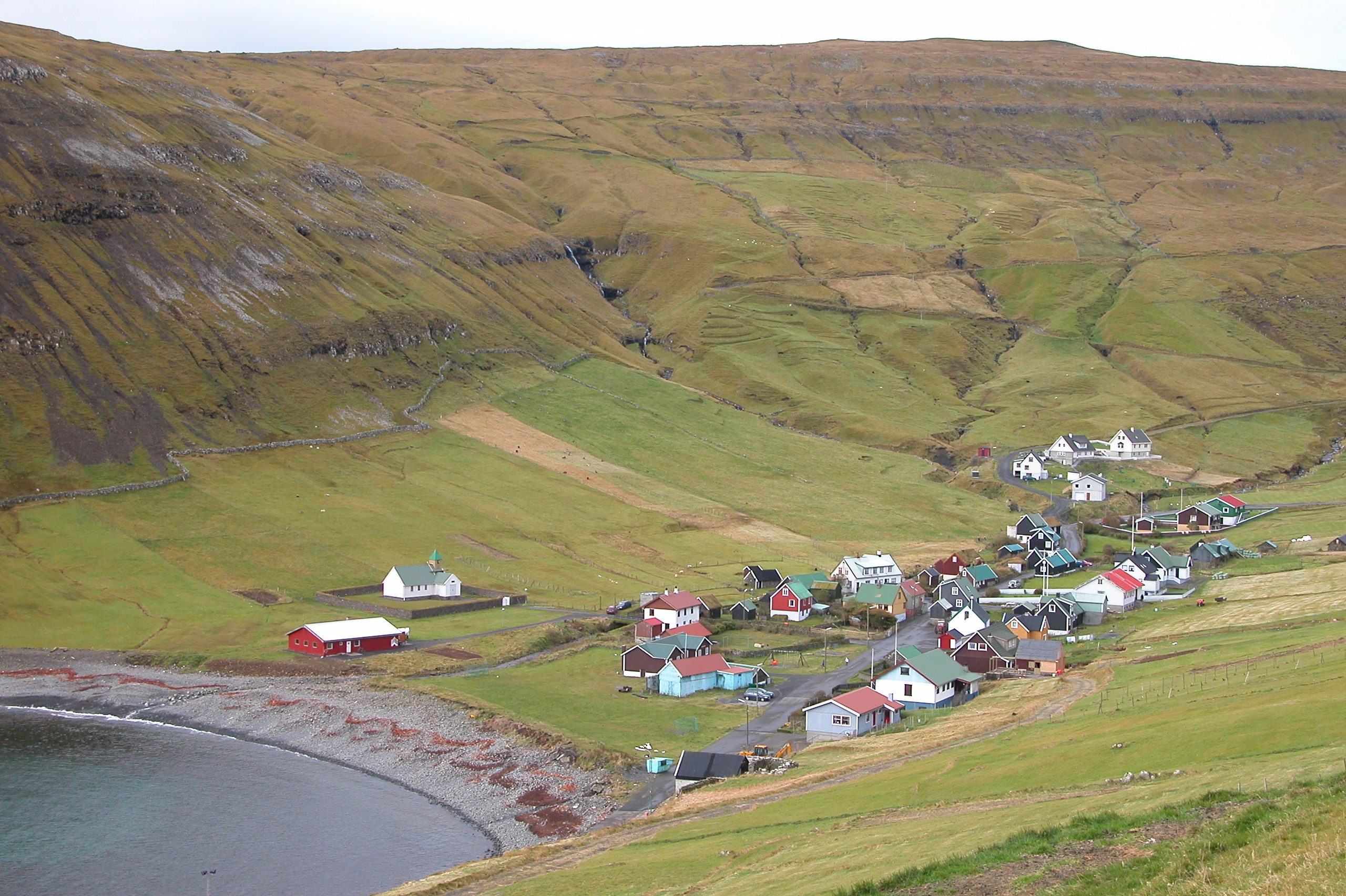
Dalur
