= Karin Kjølbro =

Faroese politician

5th President of the West Nordic Council
- In office 1990–1991
- Preceded by: Friðjón Þórðarson
- Succeeded by: Jonathan Motzfeldt

Member of Parliament
- In office 1978–1990

Personal details
- Born: 27 March 1944 (age 81) Klaksvík, Faroe Islands
- Political party: Republic (Tjóðveldi)
- Spouse(s): Ørvur Thomassen, Høgni Debes Joensen
- Children: Brynhild, Bergtóra, Hanus

Karin Rannvá Kjølbro (born 27 March 1944 in Klaksvík) is a former Faroese politician and social worker. She was one of the pioneers amongst Faroese women in politics, being one of the two first women who were elected to the Løgting, which happened in 1978 along with Jona Henriksen.

== Biography ==
She was educated examen artium in 1963, and finished her education as a social worker in 1968 and alcohol adviser in 1994. She was employed be the Danish Statens Åndssvageforsorg in order to arrange for 120 Faroese people who were intellectually disabled to move back to the Faroe Islands after living in the Danish institution Rødbygaard in Lolland for most of their lives. The initiative for this transfer came from the Danish government. The Faroese authorities showed very little interest for social politics. The Faroese people got the right to get an early retirement because of disability in and state pension at age 67 in 1959, but except for that social services were quite unknown in the Faroe Islands, and politicians thought it was a healthy sign, that the islands didn't need welfare state institutions, because care functions were performed by the women in the families. Kjølbro succeeded only in moving a smaller amount of the intellectually disabled people back home, only those who had families who could take care of them or who could manage to work. When she realised that the Faroese authorities had no intention in building institutions for the rest of the Faroese intellectually disabled people in Denmark, she chose to mobilise the grass roots and was one of the founders of Javni, which is a grass root organisation for Faroese people with disabilities and their families, it was the first of its kind in the Faroe Islands. Kjølbro also made other efforts in order to make the Faroese people aware of their rights, one of these efforts was to start a social letterbox in the Faroese newspaper 14. september.

Kjølbro also worked for Faroese Council for People with Disabilities (Andveikraverndin) 1969–1971, Glostrup Hospital, Danmark 1972–1976, and worked as a director of the Faroese Correctional Services (Kriminalforsorgin) from 1976 until she retired in 2012.

Karin Kjølbro is the granddaughter of shipowner Jógvan Frederik Kjølbro (J.F. Kjølbro) and shipowner Ewald Kjølbro's niece. She has three children with Chief Medical Officer Høgni Debes Joensen with whom she was married 1966-85: Brynhild Høgnadóttir, Bergtóra Høgnadóttir Joensen and Hanus Debes Joensen, her daughter Bergtóra was a member of the Løgting from 2008-11 for Republic. Since 1999 she has been married to captain Ørvur Thomassen.

== Political career ==
Kjølbro took seat as extra member of the Løgting representing Republic and the South Streymoy electoral district from 1970–1974. She was the first woman, together with Jona Henriksen, elected to the Løgting in 1978. She was a member of the Løgting from 1978 until 1990. In 1979 Kjøbro presented a legislative proposal about equal rights for men and women, but this bill was rejected and was not adopted until 1996. For a period she was vice speaker of the Løgting. She was editor of Republic's newspaper 14. September 1983 – 1984. Kjølbro was president of the Faroese Women's Association (Kvinnufelagssamskipan Føroya) 1990–1993 and president of the West Nordic Council 1990–1991. She was president for the Faroese Unemployment Insurance (Arbeiðsloysiskipanin, short form: ALS) from 1996-2004 and board member for the Nordic House from 1996. She is board member of Dugni (Institution who helps people under 67 years old with various problems to find a job, to get rehabilitation or an education etc.).
