= Norðoyar =

Group of six islands in the northeast of the Faroe Islands

- Region
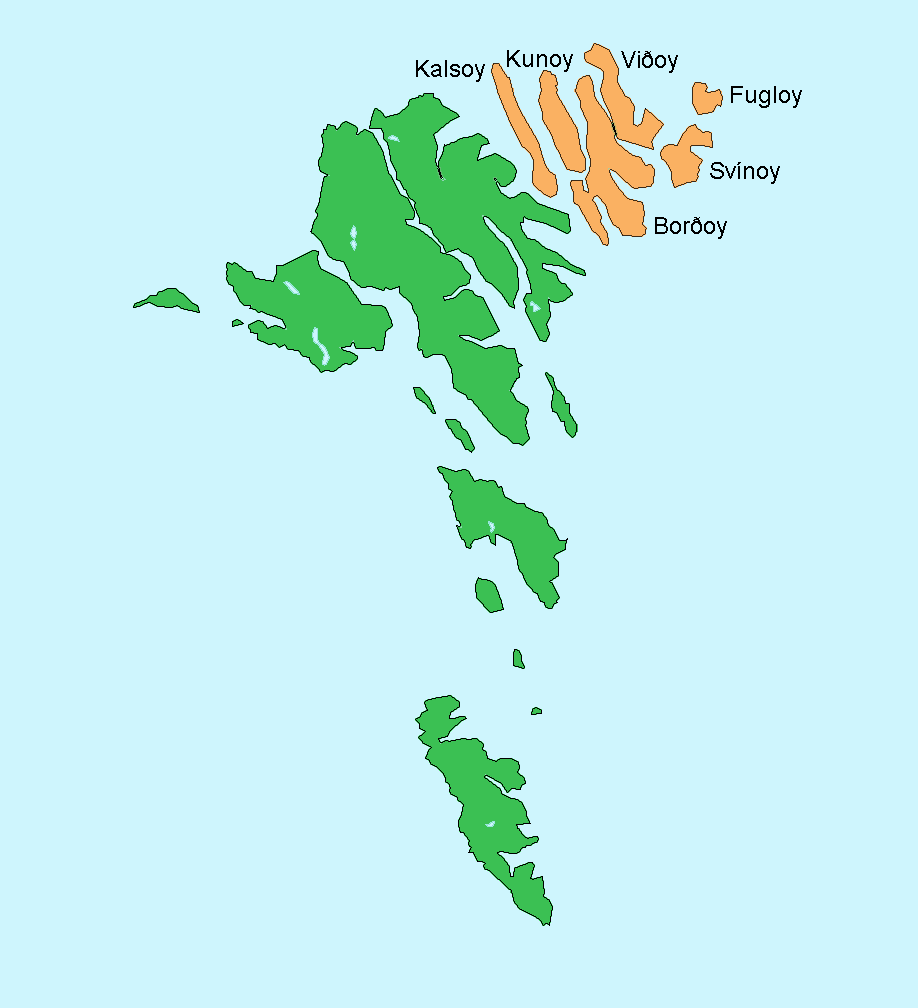
- Norðoyar (orange) among the Faroe Islands
- Coordinates: 62.282°N 6.543°W
- State: Kingdom of Denmark
- Constituent country: Faroe Islands

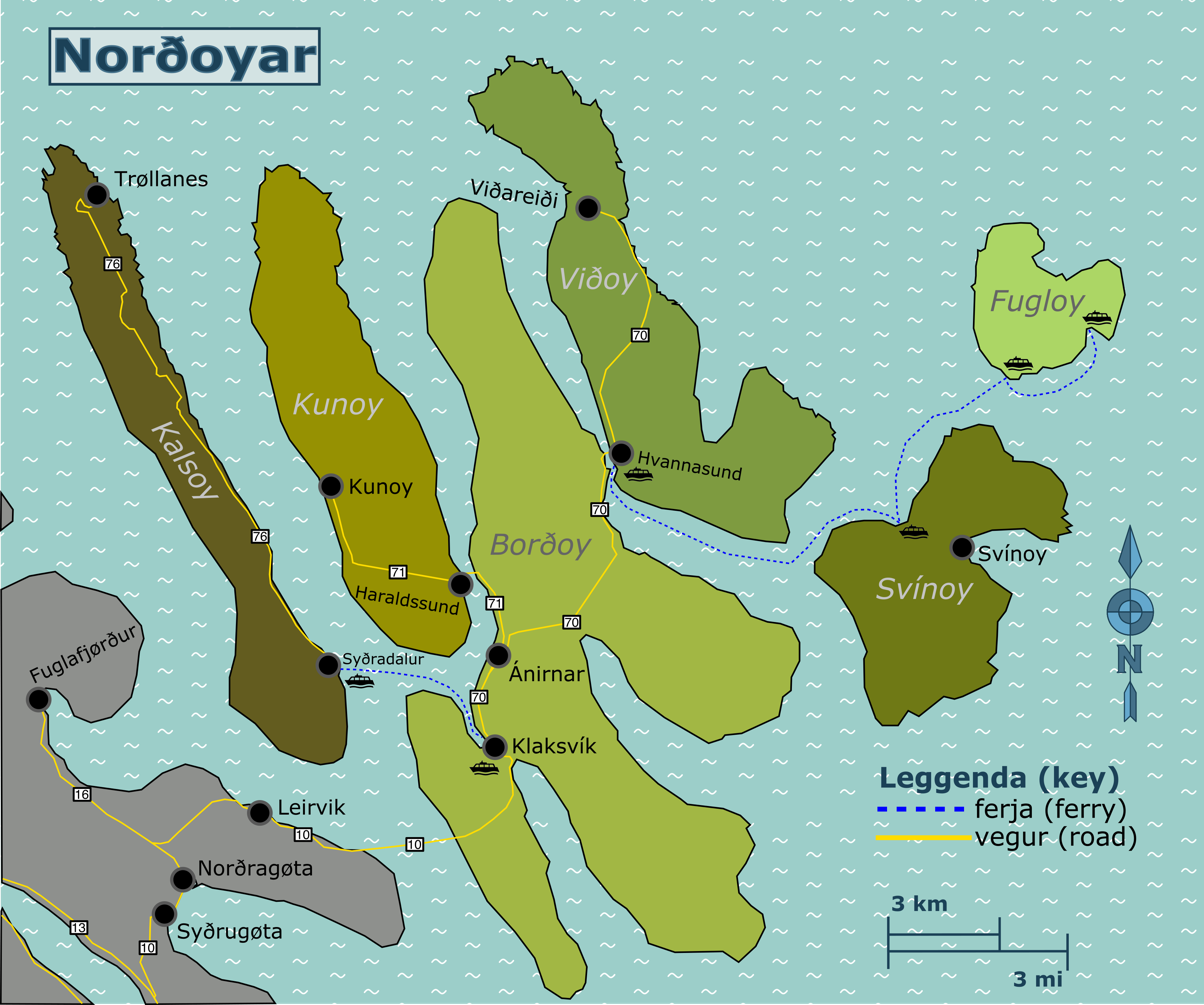
Map of the six Northern Islands.

The six islands in the northeast of the Faroe Islands are together referred to as Norðoyar, i.e. the Northern Isles (Danish: Norderøerne). These Islands from west to east are Kalsoy, Kunoy, Borðoy, Viðoy, Svínoy and Fugloy. Klaksvík is the biggest settlement of the region. Norðoyar is sometimes spelled Norðoyggjar.

In the 1946 independence referendum, 67.3% of Norðoyar voters chose independence, the highest proportion out of any Faroese region.
