= List of sea stacks =

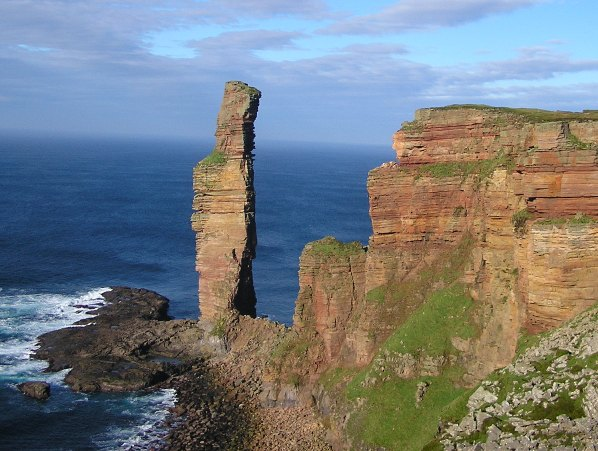
Old Man of Hoy, Scotland

The following list enumerates and expands on notable sea stacks, including former sea stacks that no longer exist.

== Antarctica ==
- Denais Stack, King George Island
- Cutler Stack, Livingston Island
- Neptune's Bellow, Deception Island
- The Monolith, Buckle Island
- Shag Rocks (South Georgia)
- Black Rock, South Georgia

== Asia ==
- Po Pin Chau, High Island, Hong Kong
- Tri Brata, Kamchatka, Russia
- Ko Tapu, Phang Nga Bay, Thailand
- Bako National Park, Sarawak, Borneo, Malaysia
- Lot's Wife or Sofugan, Japan (isolated volcanic stack, not a coastal stack)
- Pigeon's Rock, Raouché Lebanon

== Australia ==
- Ball's Pyramid, Lord Howe Island Group (isolated volcanic stack, not a coastal stack)
- Nobby Islet, Kangaroo Island, South Australia
- The Twelve Apostles on the Great Ocean Road, Victoria
- The Nobbies on Phillip Island, Victoria
- The Totem Pole in Tasmania
- London Bridge (Victoria)
- Gibson Steps
- Loch Ard Gorge
- The Grotto, Victoria

== Europe ==
(coastal countries only)

=== Croatia ===
- Cape Kamenjak

=== Faroe Islands ===
- Drangarnir
- Risin og Kellingin
- Stakkurin

=== France ===
- Les Aiguilles de Port-Coton, Belle-Île
- L'Aiguille, Étretat, Seine-Maritime
- Les Jumeaux, Hendaye

=== Germany ===
- Lange Anna on Heligoland

=== Greece ===
- Megalos Kalogeros
- Mikros Kalogeros

=== Iceland ===
- Hvítserkur, Vatnsnes
- Reynisdrangar, Vík í Mýrdal

=== Ireland ===
- Cnoc na Mara, Donegal
- Branaunmore, County Clare
- Dún Briste, Ballycastle, County Mayo
- An Searrach, Kinard, Dingle, County Kerry

=== Isle of Man ===
- Sugarloaf Rock, Isle of Man

=== Italy ===
- Faraglioni, Capri
- Baia dei Mergoli, Mattinata, southern Italy
- Torre Sant'Andrea, southern Italy
- Acitrezza, Sicily
- Faraglioni, Scopello, Trapani, Sicily
- Isola del Giglio, Tuscany
- Nebida and Masua, Iglesias, south-western Sardinia
- Scoglio dell'Ulivo, Palmi
- Gargano Promontory, Zagare Bay, Apulia

=== Portugal ===
- Praia da Dona Ana and Ponta da Piedade, Lagos
- Praia da Marinha, Lagoa, Algarve

=== Russia ===
- Sail Rock, Krasnodar Krai

=== Spain ===
- El Dedo de Dios, Canary Islands

=== United Kingdom ===
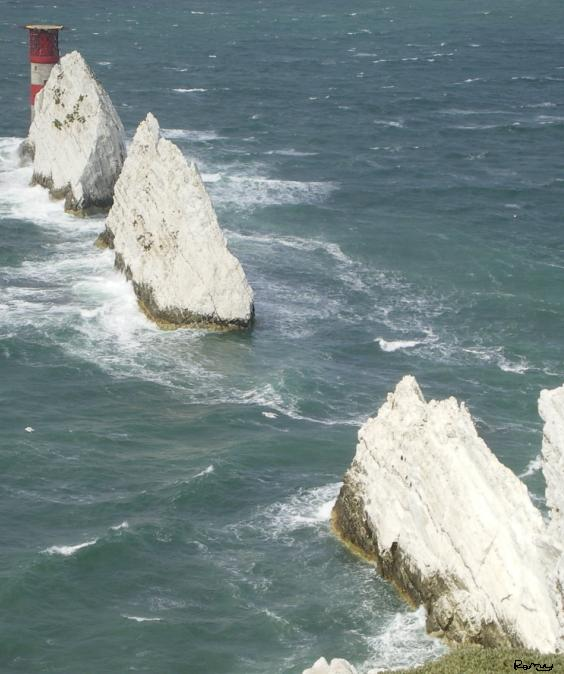
The Needles, a series of chalk stacks extending out from the western end of the Isle of Wight. The Needles are almost directly in line with Old Harry Rocks, another series of chalk stacks.

Mellor (2020) lists 70 stacks in England, 10 in Wales and 275 in Scotland of which c. 110 are located around the coasts of Shetland.

==== England ====
- Bedruthan Steps, Cornwall
- The Needles, Isle of Wight
- Old Harry Rocks, Dorset
- The Pinnacle, Dorset
- Little Pinnacle, Dorset

==== Wales ====
- South Stack, Anglesey

==== Scotland ====
- Am Buachaille, Sutherland
- Duncansby Stacks, Caithness
- Dunnicaer, Aberdeenshire (stack with remains of Pictish hill fort)
- Old Man of Hoy, Orkney
- Old Man of Stoer, Sutherland
- Rockall, North Atlantic (isolated volcanic stack, not a coastal stack)
- Stac an Armin and Stac Lee, St Kilda
- Stac Dhomnuill Chaim, Lewis
- Yesnaby Castle, Orkney

== North America ==
=== Canada ===
- The Big Flowerpot, Flowerpot Island, Lake Huron
- Three Sisters, Eatonville, Nova Scotia
- Percé Rock, Percé, Quebec
- Hopewell Rocks, Hopewell Cape, New Brunswick
- Pokeshaw Rock, Pokeshaw, New Brunswick
- Siwash Rock, Vancouver, British Columbia

=== Caribbean ===
● Redonda

● Diamond Rock

=== Mexico ===
- Cabo San Lucas, Baja California Sur
- Rocas Alijos

=== United States ===
- Goat Rock, California
- Turnip Rock, Michigan
- Haystack Rock, Cannon Beach, Oregon
- Haystack Rock (Chief Kiwanda Rock), Pacific City, Oregon

== Oceania ==
=== Easter Island ===
- Motu Kau Kau, Easter Island

== See also ==
List of rock formations
