= Hvalvík =

Hvalvík Kvalvig (Danish)
- Village
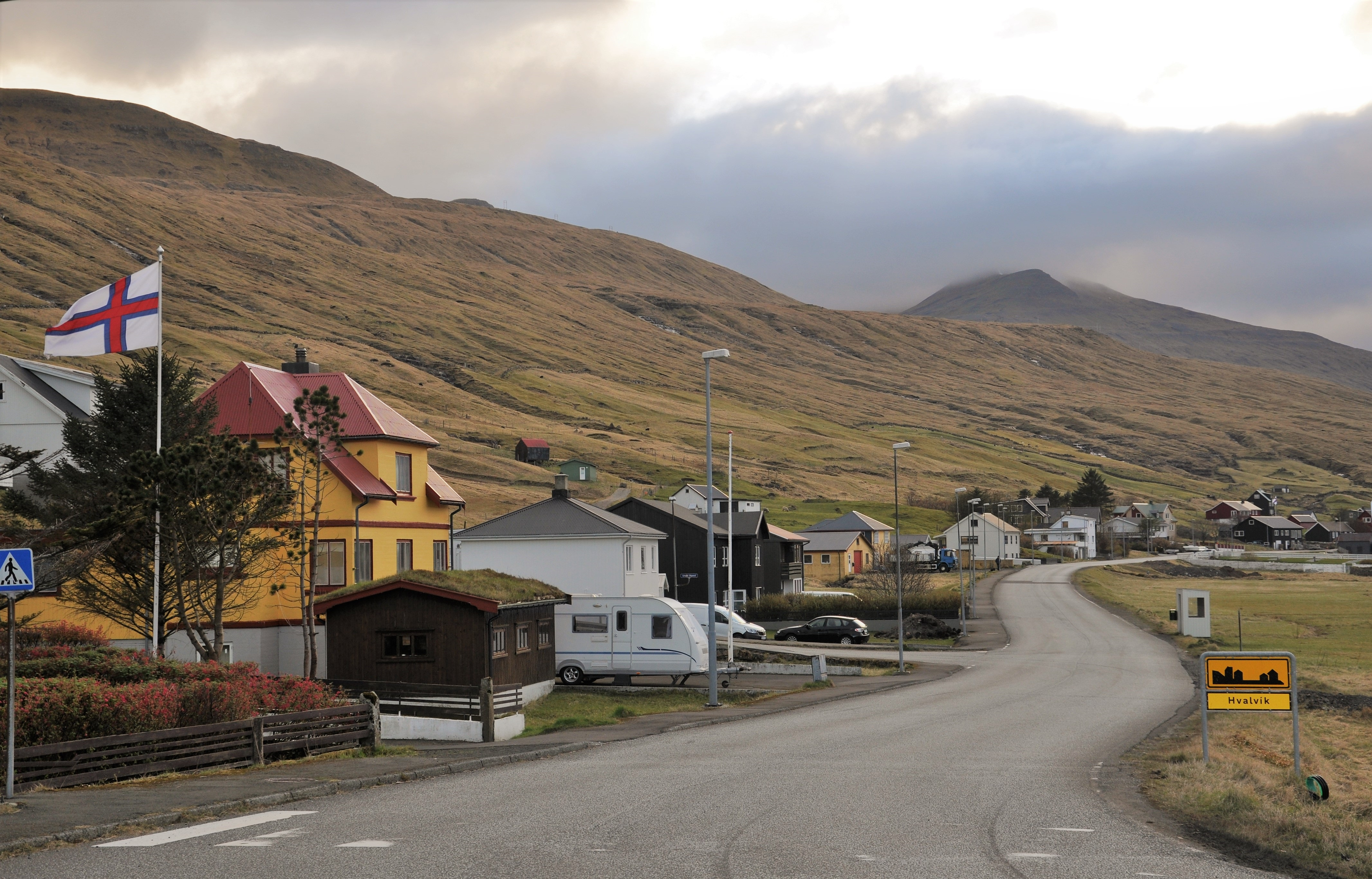
- Entering Hvalvík

- Location in the Faroe Islands
- Coordinates: 62°11′23″N 7°1′51″W
- State: Kingdom of Denmark
- Country: Faroe Islands
- Island: Streymoy
- Municipality: Sunda

Population (September 2025)
  - Total: 252
- Time zone: GMT
  - Summer (DST): UTC+1 (EST)
- Postal code: FO 430
- Climate: ET

Hvalvík (Danish: Kvalvig) is a village in the Faroe Islands, located in a valley on the east coast of the island of Streymoy.

It is the southern half of a twin-village situated on both sides of the valley. The villages are divided by the river Stórá. The northern half which is approximately the same size is called Streymnes. Together the two villages have a population of more than 400 inhabitants.

Hvalvík-Streymnes is a village that has grown rapidly during the past years, mainly because of its proximity to the capital Tórshavn.

== Hvalvík Church ==
The church in Hvalvík is a traditional wooden church dating from 1829, built because the old church from 1700 was ruined in a storm. It is the third oldest church in the Faroe Islands, though the oldest of the traditional wooden black churches. The church is built with wood bought from a ship that ran aground in Saksun in 1828. The architecture is typically Faroese, with no stone foundations. The pulpit dates back to 1609 and was originally in the church in Tórshavn.

Bishop Alexander was raised in Hvalvík, in a place called Frammi við Kráir. According to legend, he was the first to import knives and forks.

The church was featured on Faroese stamps issued in 1997:

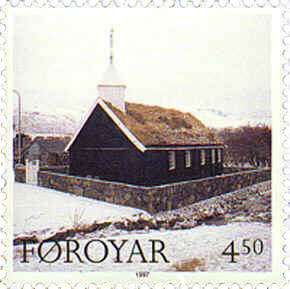
Stamp FR 318

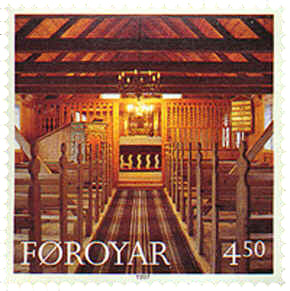
Stamp FR 319

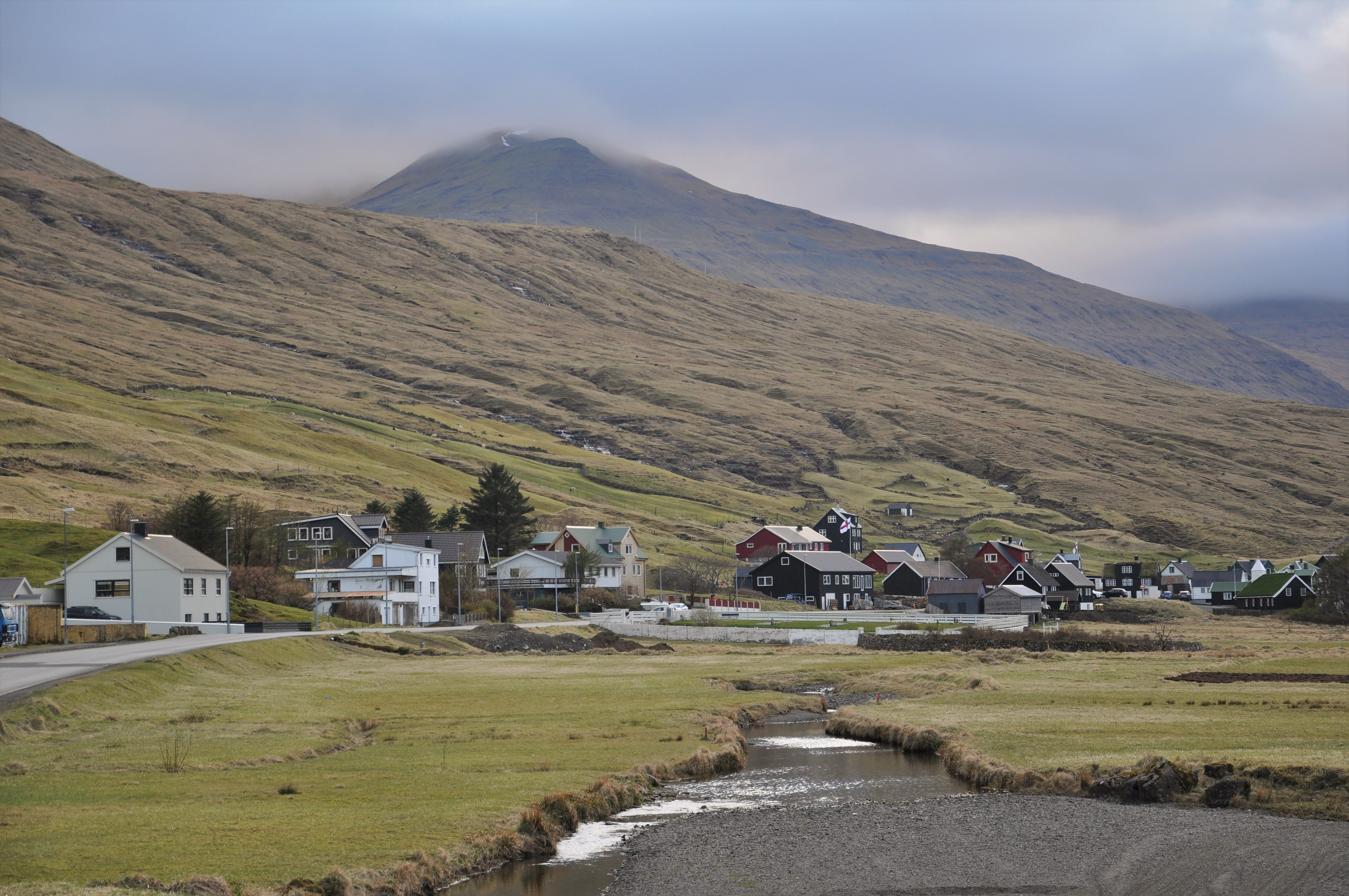
Hvalvík, with the church on the extreme right

Hvalvík means "Whale Bay", for it is a good place for whaling.

== See also ==
- List of towns in the Faroe Islands
