= Nordic folklore =

Nordic folklore is the folklore of Denmark, Norway, Sweden, Iceland and the Faroe Islands. It has common roots with, and has been under mutual influence with, folklore in England, Germany, the Low Countries, the Baltic countries, Finland and Sápmi. Folklore is a concept encompassing expressive traditions of a particular culture or group. The peoples of Scandinavia are heterogenous, as are the oral genres and material culture that has been common in their lands. However, there are some commonalities across Scandinavian folkloric traditions, among them a common ground in elements from Norse mythology as well as Christian conceptions of the world.

Among the many tales common in Scandinavian oral traditions, some have become known beyond Scandinavian borders – examples include The Three Billy Goats Gruff and The Giant Who Had No Heart in His Body.

== Legends ==
- Tróndur was a powerful Viking chieftain who lived in the Faroe Islands during the 9th century. According to legend, Tróndur was killed by a Christian missionary named Sigmundur Brestisson, who had come to the islands to spread Christianity. Tróndur's legacy lives on in Faroese folklore, where he is often portrayed as a tragic hero.
- Risin and Kellingin are a pair of giants who are said to live on the island of Eysturoy. They are said to be very large and strong, and they are often depicted as being angry and destructive.
- Skógafoss is a waterfall located in the south of Iceland, and is home to a number of folk tales, including one about hidden treasure that is said to be buried at the base of the waterfall by Þrasi Þórólfsson.
- Reynisfjara is a black sand beach located in the south of Iceland. It is known for its towering basalt columns and its sea stacks. The beach is also home to a number of folk tales, including one about a pair of trolls who were turned to stone by the sun.

== Traditions ==
- Grindadráp: This traditional whaling practice is deeply rooted in the cultural history and mythology of the Faroe Islands and has been a significant part of their way of life for centuries. The Grindadráp is associated with various customs, beliefs, and rituals, including the importance of communal cooperation and the sharing of resources. However, the Grindadráp is also a contested and controversial practice in modern times, with concerns about its impact on animal welfare and sustainability.
- Íslendingasögur (Icelandic Sagas or Sagas of Icelanders) are a series of prose narratives about events that took place in Iceland in the 9th, 10th and early 11th centuries. They are mostly based on historical events, but they also contain elements of fiction. The sagas tell the stories of the early settlers of Iceland, their families, and their descendants. Íslendingasögur are considered to be some of the finest examples of medieval literature. The sagas were originally written down in the 13th and 14th centuries, but they are believed to have been passed down orally for many years before that.
- Runes are letters of several related alphabets historically used by various Germanic peoples, including the Norse. In Nordic folklore, runes hold significant cultural and mystical importance. They are often associated with the god Odin, who, according to myth, obtained the knowledge of runes through self-sacrifice. In modern Nordic culture, runes continue to hold symbolic and cultural significance. While the runic alphabet is no longer in common use for writing, it has become a popular element in art, jewelry, and tattoos, often serving as a connection to Norse heritage and a way to express cultural pride.
- Þorrablót is an annual mid-winter festival that celebrates traditional Icelandic cuisine. The festival is named after the month of Þorri, which falls in January or February, and features dishes such as fermented shark, dried fish, and smoked lamb. The festival also includes music, dancing, and other cultural activities.

== Folk dances ==
Nordic folklore's traditional dances, intricately linked to celebrations, rituals, and communal assemblies, exhibit specific movements, patterns, and music deeply ingrained in the cultural fabric of the region. An exploration of these dances unveils insights into social dynamics, community cohesion, and the perpetuation of mythological themes across generations.

=== Norway ===
- One Norwegian folk dance, Halling, is characterized by its quick tempo (95–106 bpm) and features acrobatic moves. Typically performed by men during weddings or parties, Halling showcases athleticism through kicks, spins, and rhythmic footwork. The dance serves not only as a form of entertainment, but also as a display of skill and strength.

=== Sweden ===
- Polska: Often danced as a couple, characterized by smooth flowing movements. Fiddle or nyckelharpa instruments are often found accompanying this dance. The dance holds cultural significance as it is commonly associated with celebrations and social gatherings.

=== Faroe islands ===
- The Faroese Chain Dance is the national dance of the Faroe Islands, often accompanied by kvæði, the Faroese ballads. Dancers form a circle, holding hands, and move in a rhythmic and coordinated manner. These ballads may recount tales of legendary heroes, folklore figures, or historical events specific to the Faroe Islands. The combination of dance and music enhances the immersive experience, allowing participants to physically engage with the narratives.

== Folk architecture ==
=== Norway ===
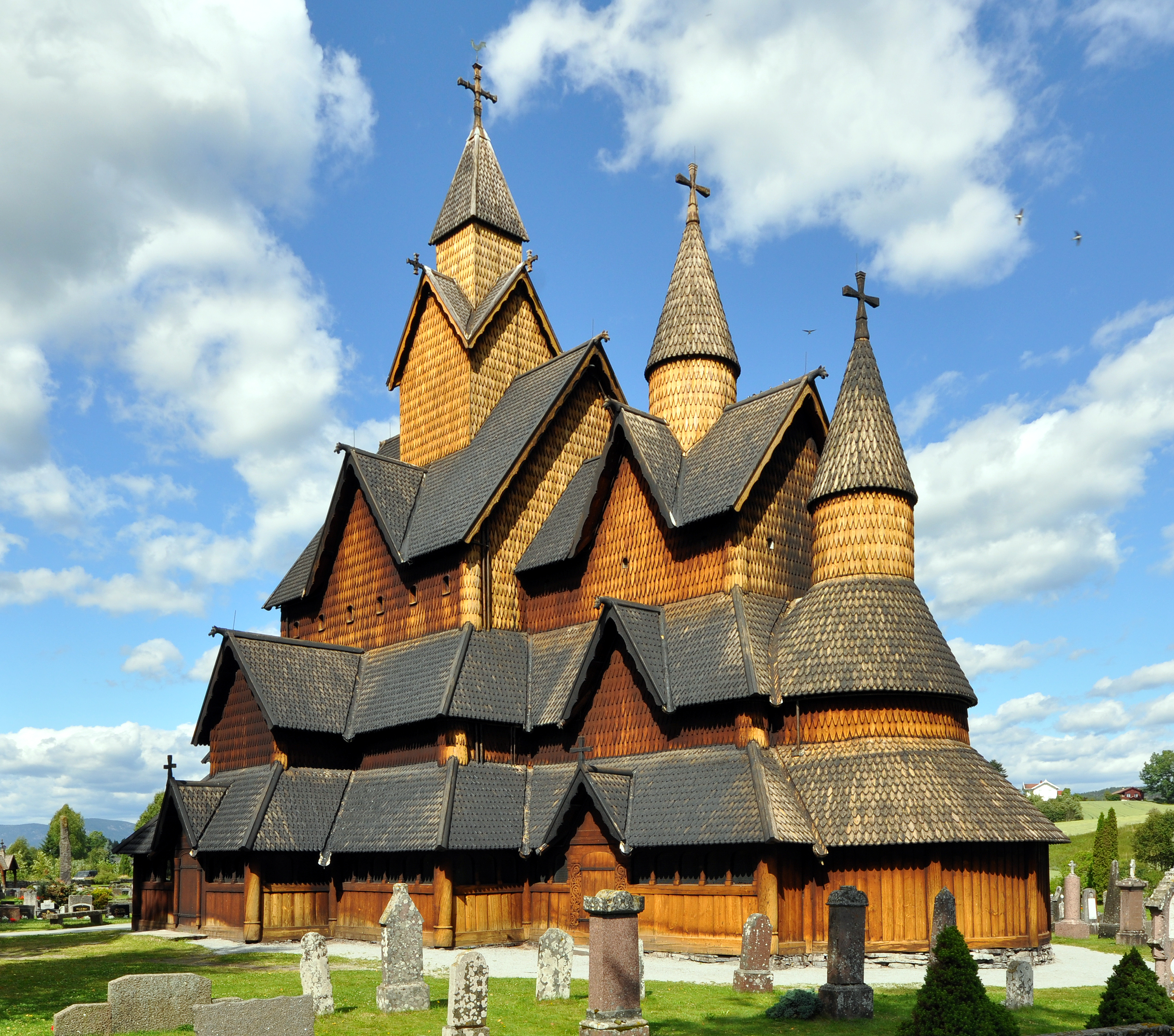
A stave church in Norway

Stave churches in Norway represent a unique synthesis of Christian and Norse cultural influences, evident in their architectural and ornamental features. These wooden structures, characterized by intricate carvings, serve as tangible artifacts linking contemporary communities to historical narratives. Beyond mere historical relics, Stave churches function as active centers for cultural preservation, hosting various ceremonies and events. In the context of Norway's evolving cultural landscape, these churches endure as emblematic symbols of enduring identity and heritage, encapsulating the nuanced interplay between religious, mythological, and societal dimensions.

== Folklore figures ==
A large number of different mythological creatures from Scandinavian folklore have become well known in other parts of the world, mainly through popular culture and fantasy genres. Some of these are:

=== Circhos ===
The circhos is a sea creature that looks like a man with three toes on each foot. Its skin is black and red. It has a long left foot and a small right foot which drags behind, making it lean left when walking.

=== Draugr ===
Modern art of the Norwegian Christmas story, by Norwegian artist Kim Diaz Holm (den unge herr Holm), depicting the ghosts (land draugrs) fighting off the sea draugr.

The draugr, or draug (Old Norse: draugr; Icelandic: draugur; Faroese: dreygur; Norwegian: draug, drauv; Swedish: drög, dröger; Northern Sami: rávga), is an old archaic term for a malevolent revenant with varying ambiguous traits.

In the Icelandic sagas, it describes dangerous corporeal undeads which protects their burial mounds or thereof. They have magical abilities and can shapeshift, including changing size and mass.

In Norwegian folklore, the draugr either refers to land dwelling revenants, or a collective entity encompassing the drowned at sea, sometimes specified as the sea draugr (Norwegian: havdraug, sjødraug), which may appear wearing the clothes of a seaman, but featuring a head of seaweed. The latter is especially dangerous, and acts as a sign that people will drown at sea. The Wild Hunt, in Norway, has been said to involve draugrs, and, during Christmas, the old Nordic Christmas tradition of leaving out food and beer on Christmas night, as to wellcome spirits of the deceased, household spirits and thereof, into the house, involves leaving beer specifically for the draugrs, to keep them from being malicious, so called "draug-beer" (Norwegian: drøv-øl, drøv being a form for draugr). One famous Christmas story tells of a man who finds the "sea draugr" sitting by the coast on Christmas Eve, aggravating it, and then being chased by it inlands. When crossing a graveyard, the "land draugrs" (the buried) awaken and emerges from their graves to attack the sea draugr.

In Faroese folklore, the draugr is said to be a type of undead being that inhabits the mountains and hills of the Faroe Islands. It is typically described as a large, strong creature with pale skin and long, dark hair. It is often depicted as being cannibalistic.

In Sámi folklore, the draugr (Kildin Sami: роа̄ввк, roāvvk; Lule Sami: rávgga; Northern Sami: rávga; Pite Sami: rávvga; Southern Sami: raavke) is a term for a malevolent revenant and thereof. The term entered the Proto-Sámi languages during the migration period through Proto-Norse. In some Sámi folklore, it is said to be the spirit of a drowned person, which in turn drowns people. In Northern Sámi, this creature is sometimes called a "water draugr" (čáhcerávga).

=== Elves ===
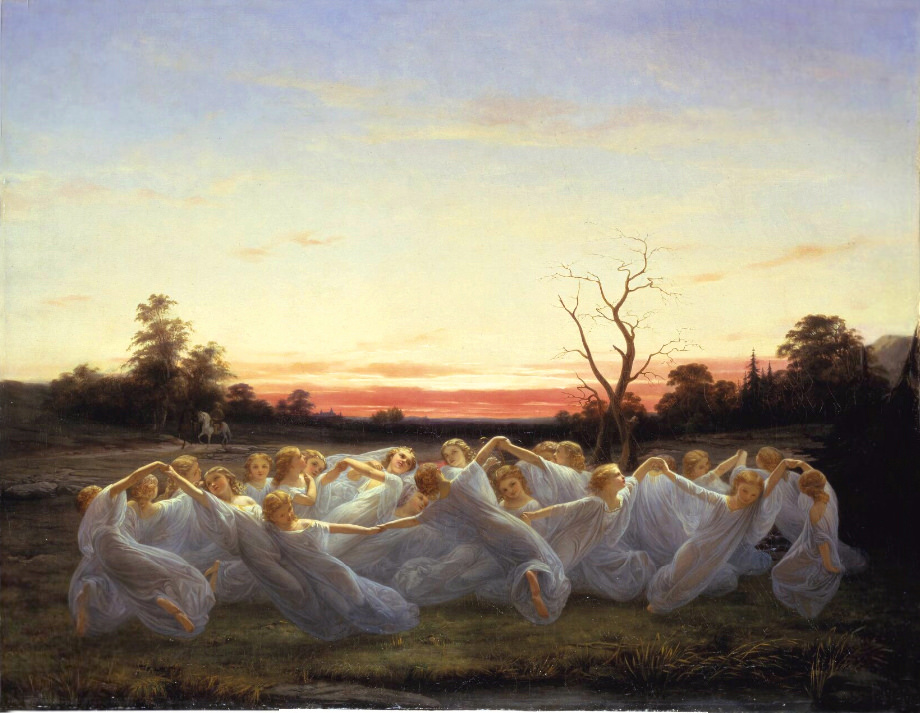
Ängsälvor, "meadow elves", (1850), painting by Nils Blommér

Elves (in Swedish, Älva if female and Alv if male, Alv in Norwegian, and Elver in Danish) are in some parts mostly described as female (in contrast to the light and dark elves in the Edda), otherworldly, beautiful and seductive residents of forests, meadows and mires. They are skilled in magic and illusions. Sometimes they are described as small fairies, sometimes as full-sized women and sometimes as half transparent spirits, or a mix thereof. They are closely linked to the mist and it is often said in Sweden that, "the Elves are dancing in the mist". The female form of Elves may have originated from the female deities called Dís (singular) and Díser (plural) found in pre-Christian Scandinavian religion. They were very powerful spirits closely linked to the seid magic. Even today the word "dis" is a synonym for mist or very light rain in Swedish, Norwegian and Danish. Particularly in Denmark, the female elves have merged with the dangerous and seductive huldra, skogsfrun or "keeper of the forest", often called hylde. In some parts of Sweden the elves also share features with the Skogsfrun, "Huldra", or "Hylda", and can seduce and bewitch careless men and suck the life out of them or make them go down in the mire and drown. But at the same time the Skogsrå exists as its own being, with other distinct features clearly separating it from the elves. In more modern tales, it isn't uncommon for a rather ugly male Tomte, Troll, Vätte or a Dwarf to fall in love with a beautiful Elven female, as the beginning of a story of impossible or forbidden love.

=== Huldra ===
The Huldra, Hylda, Skogsrå or Skogfru (Forest wife/woman) is a dangerous seductress who lives in the forest. The Huldra is said to lure men with her charm. She has a long cow's tail, or according to some traditions, that of a fox, which she ties under her skirt in order to hide it from men. If she can manage to get married in a church, her tail falls off and she becomes human.

=== Huldufolk ===
The Huldufólk are a race of fairies or elves who are said to live in the mountains, hills, and rocks of the Faroes. They are said to be similar in appearance to humans, but they are much smaller and have pale skin and long, dark hair. The huldufólk are generally benevolent creatures, but they can be mischievous if they are angered.

=== Kraken ===
Contemporary art, by Norwegian artist Kim Diaz Holm, interpreting kraken according to the 18th century descriptions.

Kraken (lit. 'the Crookie') is a legendary massive sea-monster with tentacles, said to appear off the coasts of Norway.

It is often depicted resembling a giant octopus or squid, albeit actual folklore is less defined. The Swedish encyclopedia Nordisk familjebok gave the following summation of the Kraken myth in 1884:

Kraken ("the crookie") or horven ("the harrow"), a sea monster belonging to the realm of fable, of which E. Pontoppidan, with the support of the statements of Norwegian fishermen, recorded in “Norges natuurlijke historie” (1752–53).

It is said that when fishermen row out a few miles (Scandinavian miles) from the coast on a hot summer's day in a calm, and according to normal calculations should find a depth of 80–100 fathoms (140–180 metres (460–590 ft) deep), it sometimes happens that the plummet bottoms at 20–30 fathoms (35–50 metres (115–164 ft) deep). But in this water stand the most abundant shoals of cod and lings. Then you can assume that the kraken lurks down there; as it is he who forms the artificial elevation of the bottom and by his secretions attracts fish there. But if those fishing notice that the kraken is rising, it is necessary to row away for all the boat can take. After a few minutes, the beast can then be seen lifting the upper part of its body above the surface of the water, which for a quarter of a mile (ca 1.5 mi.) in circumference appears as a collection of skerries, covered with swaying, seaweed-like growths. Finally, a few shining tentacles rise up in the air, increasingly thicker at the bottom, which can even appear as high as ship's masts. After a while, the kraken gives in to sinking again, and you then have to be careful not to run into the suction vortex that is formed.

=== Mara ===
In Scandinavia, there has been a widespread belief in the Mara. The Mara (or, in English, "nightmare") appears in many different forms, but would terrorize the sleeping by "riding" on their chest, thus giving them nightmares. (This appears to describe "apparitions" commonly seen and/or felt during episodes of sleep paralysis.) The Mara traditionally could ride on cattle, which would be left drained of energy and with tangled fur at the Mara's touch. Trees would curl up and wilt at the Mara's touch as well. In some tales, like the Banshee, they served as an omen of death. If one were to leave a dirty doll in a family living room, one of the members would soon fall ill and die of tuberculosis. ("Lung soot", another name for tuberculosis, referred to the effect of proper chimneys in 18th and 19th century homes. Inhabitants would therefore contract diseases due to inhaling smoke on a daily basis.)

There was some discrepancy as to how they came into being. Some stories say that the Maras are restless children, whose souls leave their body at night to haunt the living. Another tale explains that if a pregnant woman pulled a horse placenta over her head before giving birth, the child would be delivered safely; however, if it were a son, he would become a werewolf, and if a daughter, a Mara.

=== Neck ===
The Neck or the Nixie (Danish: nøkken, Norwegian: nøkken, Swedish: näcken; Icelandic: nykur, Faroese: nykur; Finnish: näkki, Estonian: näkk), among other names (Swedish: strömkarlen, "the stream man"; Nynorsk: åkallen, "the river man"), is a dangerous and powerful fresh water-dwelling spirit. It plays an instrument to lure victims to water in order to drown them. It has commonly been used as a boogieman to keep children away from dangerous water, however, it is not really a malevolent being. If gifted goods, it can give music lessons.

It is a shapeshifter, and appears in many shapes. In mainland Scandinavia, it often appears as a naked slender man, either an older bearded man, or a young fair man, but it can also appear as inanimate objects, such as underwater treasure, as well as animals. A common animal form is a white horse the water horse (Swedish: bäckahästen, åhästen, "the brook horse"), which is the conventional form on the Faroese Islands.

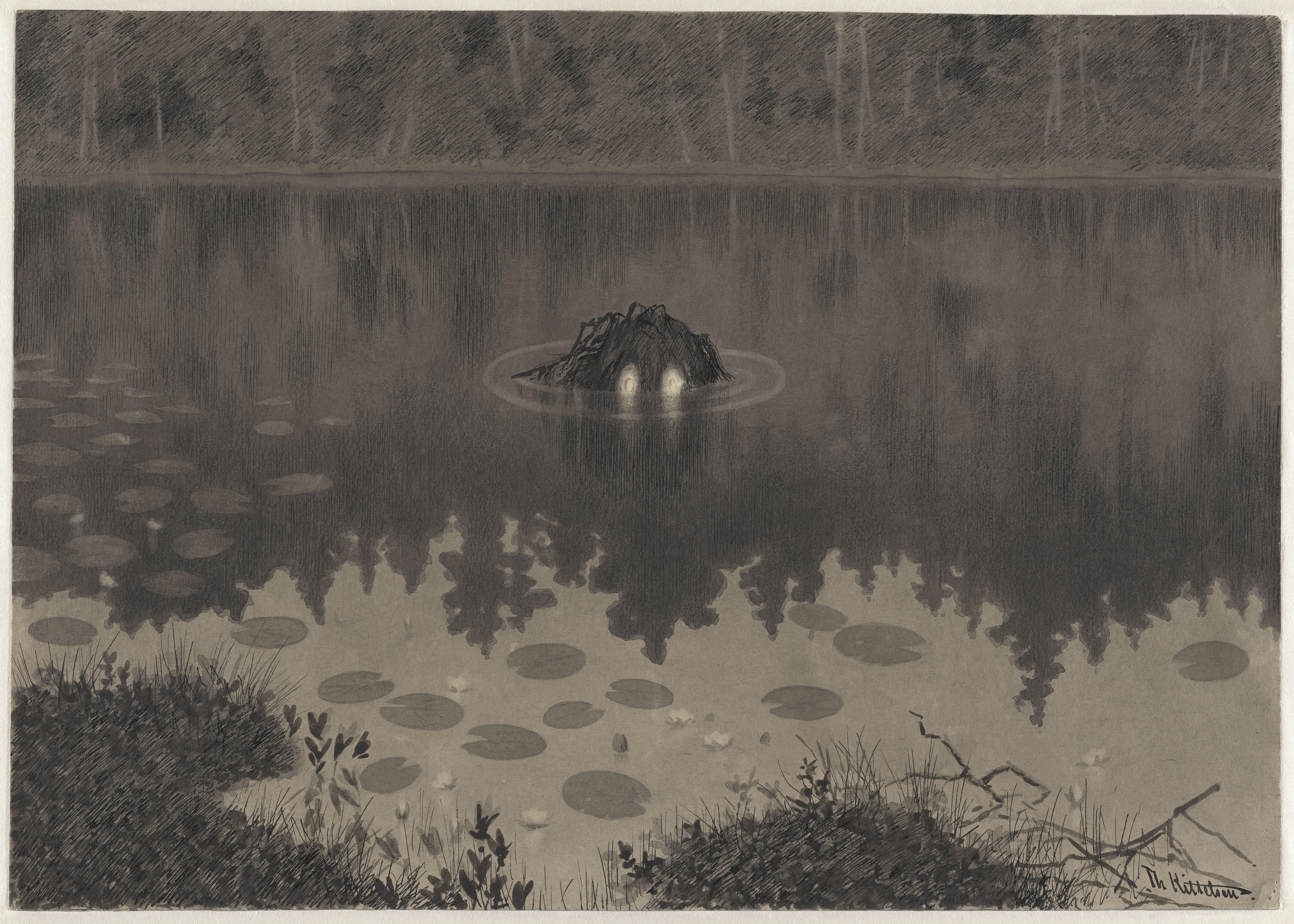
"The Water Sprite" by Norwegian Theodor Kittelsen (1857–1914), featuring a Neck lurking nighttime in a calm body of water.

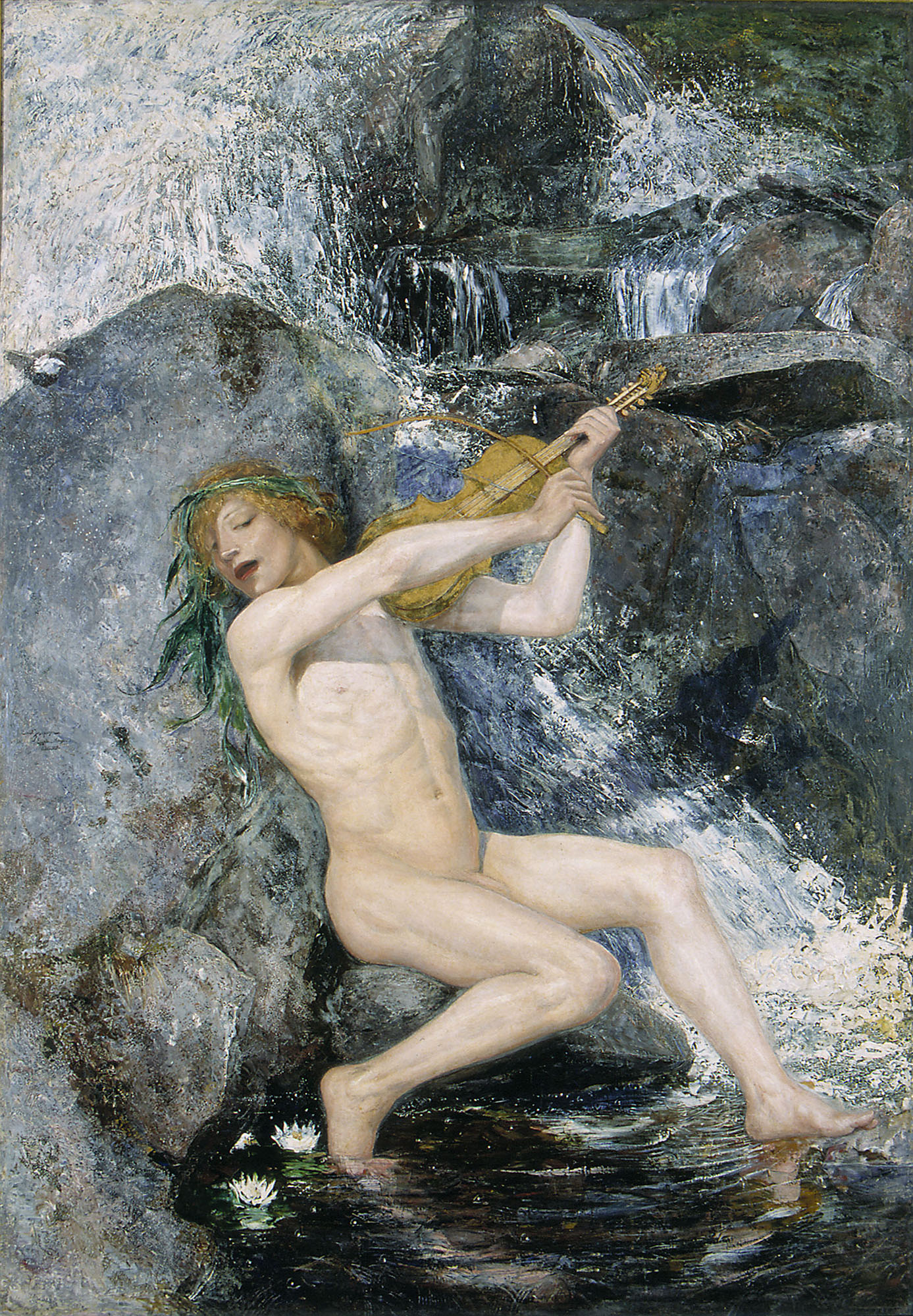
Strömkarlen by Swede Ernst Josephson (1851–1906), featuring the Neck as a fair naked man.

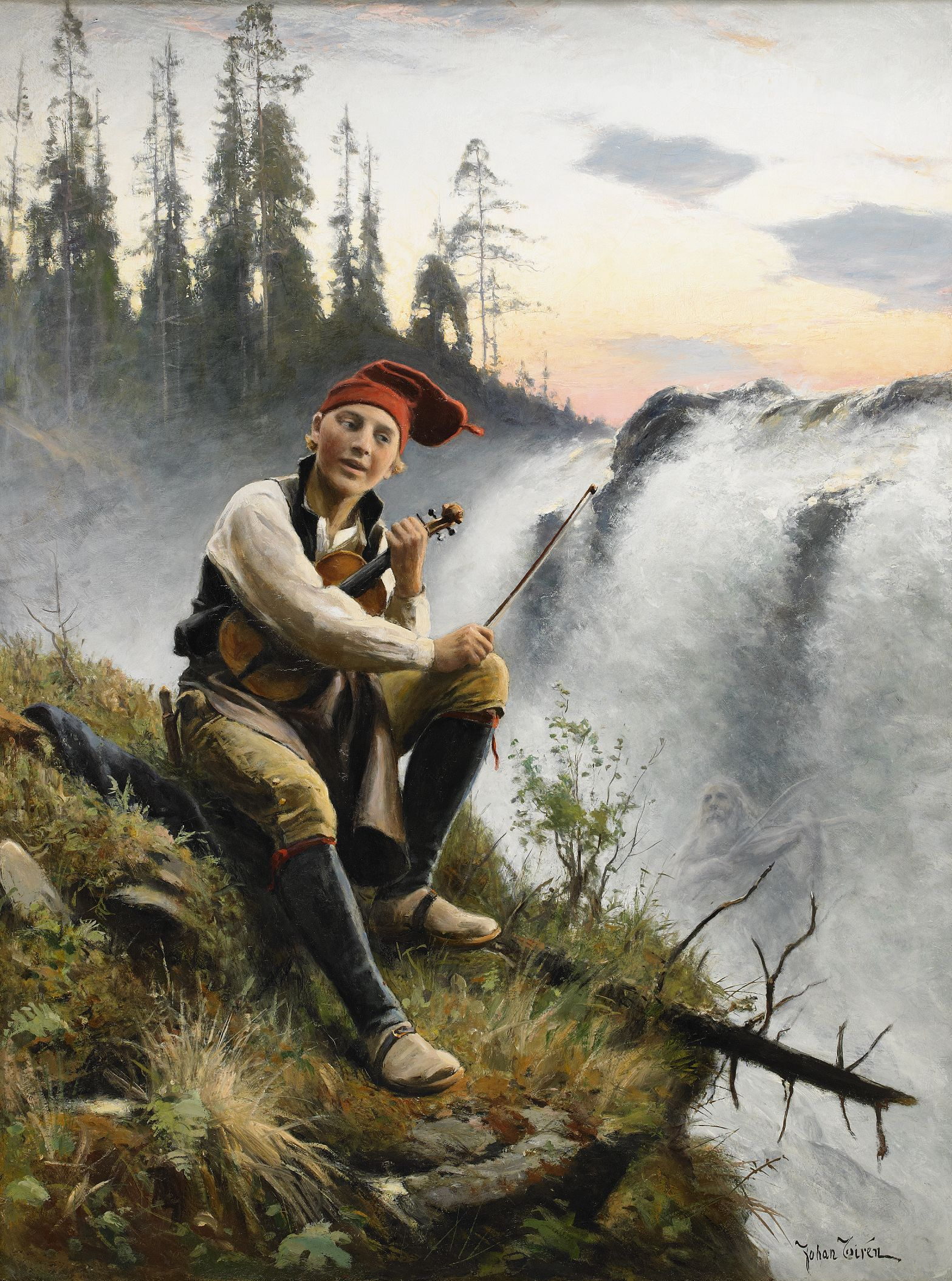
Näcken by Swede Johan Tirén (1853–1911), featuring a young boy learning violin from the Neck in the waterfall.

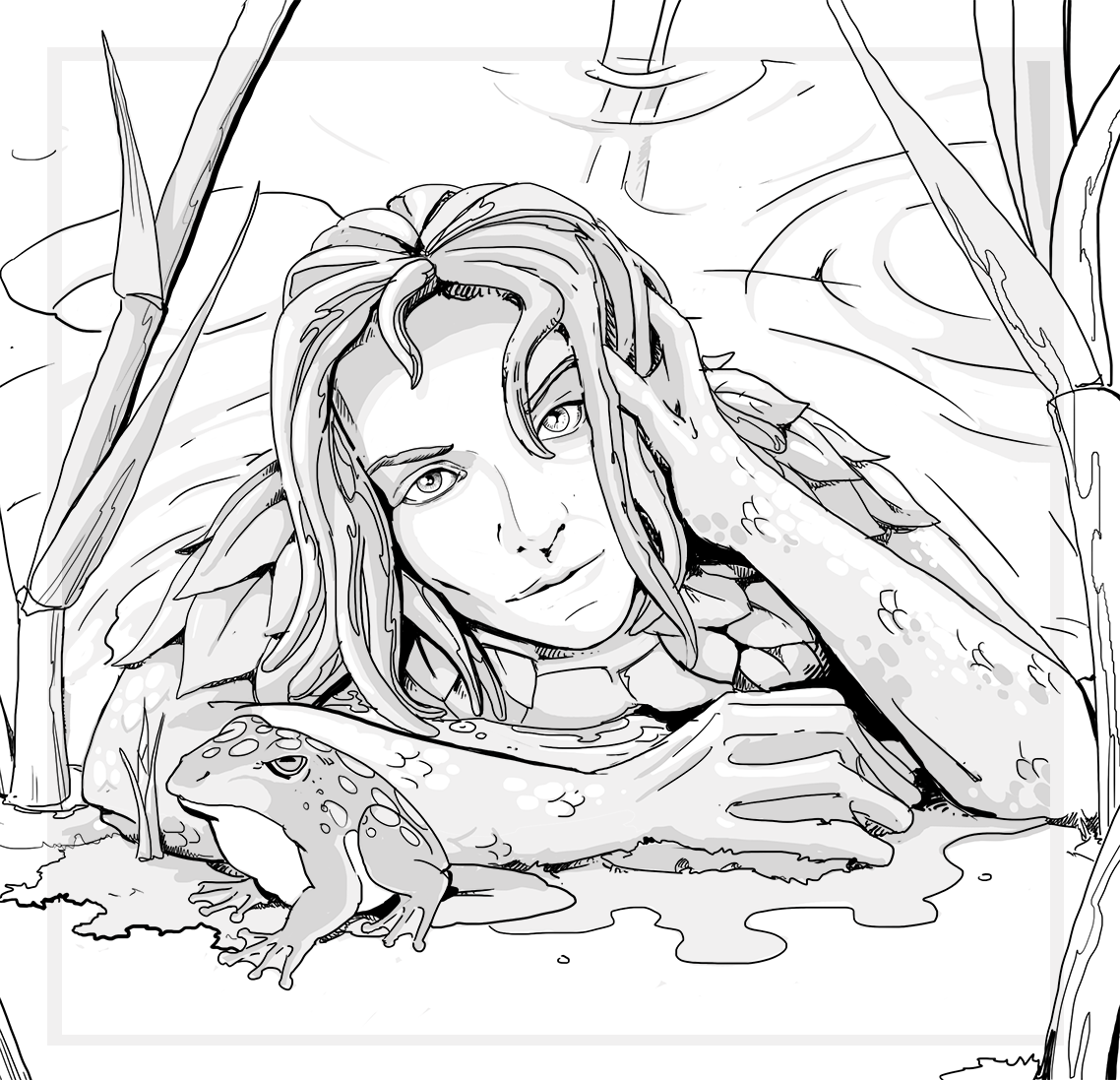
Drawing of the Neck with aquatic plants for hair. The Neck is said to have green hair or foliage in the hair.

=== Selkie ===
The Selkie is a mythical creature that is part-human and part-seal. According to legend, Selkies can shed their seal skins and transform into humans. There are many stories in Faroese folklore about Selkies falling in love with humans and leaving their sea life behind to live on land.

=== Selma ===
Selma is a legendary sea serpent said to live in the 13-kilometre-long (8.1-mile) Lake Seljord (Norwegian: Seljordsvatnet) in Seljord Municipality, Telemark county, Norway.

=== Storsjöodjuret ===
Storsjöodjuret, often referred to as the "Great Lake Monster," is steeped in the folklore of Sweden, specifically with Lake Storsjön. Notably the legendary creature was briefly granted a protected status by the Swedish Environmental Protection Agency, but this was later removed by the Swedish Parliament.

=== Trolls ===
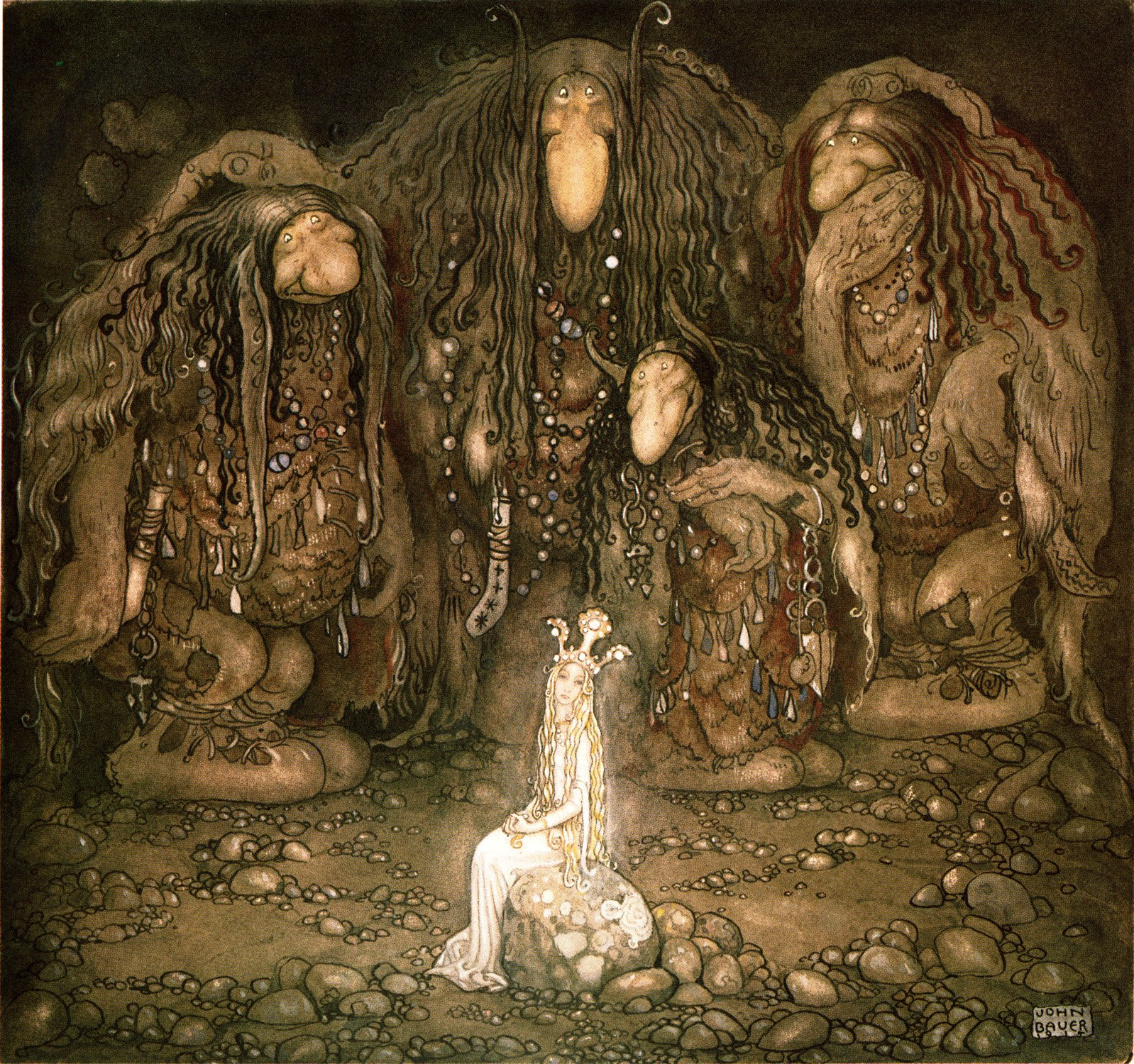
Mother Troll and Her Sons by Swedish painter John Bauer, 1915

Troll (Norwegian and Swedish), trolde (Danish) is a designation for several types of human-like supernatural beings in Scandinavian folklore. They are mentioned in the Edda (1220) as a monster with many heads. Later, trolls became characters in fairy tales, legends and ballads. They play a main part in many of the fairy tales from Asbjørnsen and Moes collections of Norwegian tales (1844). Trolls may be compared to many supernatural beings in other cultures, for instance the Cyclopes of Homer's Odyssey. In Swedish, such beings are often termed 'jätte' (giant), a word related to the Norse 'jotun'. The origins of the word troll is uncertain.

Trolls are described in many ways in Scandinavian folk literature, but they are often portrayed as stupid, and slow to act. In fairy tales and legends about trolls, the plot is often that a human with courage and presence of mind can outwit a troll. Sometimes saints' legends involve a holy man tricking an enormous troll to build a church. Trolls come in many different shapes and forms, and are generally not fair to behold, as they can have as many as nine heads. Trolls live throughout the land. They dwell in mountains, under bridges, and at the bottom of lakes. Trolls who live in the mountains may be rich and hoard mounds of gold and silver in their cliff dwellings. Dovregubben, a troll king, lives inside the Dovre Mountains with his court, as described in detail in Ibsen's Peer Gynt.

=== Wights ===
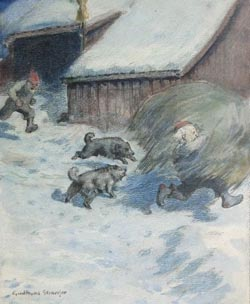
An illustration made by Gudmund Stenersen of an angry nisse stealing hay from a farmer

Wights (Old Norse: vættr, véttr, vítr; Danish: vætte; Norwegian: vette; Swedish: vätte 'm', vittra 'f'), is one of many common terms for supernatural, small, human-like creatures, often thought to live underground. Such is both defined as its own thing, as well as being an umbrella term for many different types of folklorean beings. In Finnish, such are called: hiisi, maahinen, and haltija; in Sámi: ganij, sajva (Southern Sami: saajve), ulda (Northern Sami: ulddát), and kadinah, depending on the area.

The Nisse (in southern Sweden, Norway and Denmark) or tomte (in Sweden) is a benevolent wight who takes care of the house and barn when the farmer is asleep, but only if the farmer reciprocates by setting out food for the nisse and he himself also takes care of his family, farm and animals. If the nisse is ignored or maltreated or the farm is not cared for, he is likely to sabotage the work instead to teach the farmer a lesson. Although the nisse should be treated with respect, some tales warn against treating him too kindly. There's a Swedish story in which a farmer and his wife entered their barn early in the morning and found a little, old, grey man sweeping the floor. They saw his clothing, which was nothing more than torn rags, and the wife decided to make him some new ones; when the nisse found them in the barn, however, he considered himself too elegant to perform any more farm labour and thus disappeared from the farm. Nisser are also associated with Christmas and the yule time. Farmers customarily place bowls of rice porridge on their doorsteps to please the nisser, comparative to the cookies and milk left out for Santa Claus in other cultures. Some believe that the nisse brings them presents as well.

In Swedish, the word "tomten" (definite form of "tomte") is very closely linked to the word for the plot of land where a house or cottage is built, which is called "tomten" as well (definite form of "tomt"). Therefore, some scholars believe that the wight Tomten originates from some sort of general house god or deity prior to Old Norse religion. A Nisse/Tomte is said to be able to change his size between that of a 5-year-old child and a thumb, and also to have the ability to make himself invisible.

A type of wight from Northern Sweden called Vittra lives underground, is invisible most of the time and has its own cattle. Most of the time Vittra are rather distant and do not meddle in human affairs, but are fearsome when enraged. This can be achieved by not respecting them properly, for example by neglecting to perform certain rituals (such as saying "look out" when putting out hot water or going to the toilet so they can move out of the way) or building your home too close to or, even worse, on top of their home, disturbing their cattle or blocking their roads. They can make your life very very miserable or even dangerous – they do whatever it takes to drive you away, even arrange accidents that will harm or even kill you. Even in modern days, people have rebuilt or moved houses in order not to block a "Vittra-way", or moved from houses that are deemed a "Vittra-place" (Vitterställe) because of bad luck – although this is rather uncommon. In tales told in the north of Sweden, Vittra often take the place that trolls, tomte and vättar hold in the same stories told in other parts of the country. Vittra are believed to sometimes "borrow" cattle that later would be returned to the owner with the ability to give more milk as a sign of gratitude. This tradition is heavily influenced by the fact that it was developed during a time when people let their cattle graze on mountains or in the forest for long periods of the year.

== See also ==
- Birgit Ridderstedt
- Danish folklore
- Henrik Ibsen's 1867 play Peer Gynt
- Huldufólk
- John Bauer (illustrator)
- Norse mythology
- Norske Folkeeventyr, a collection of Norwegian folktales
- Thunderstone (folklore)
