= Saksun =

- Village
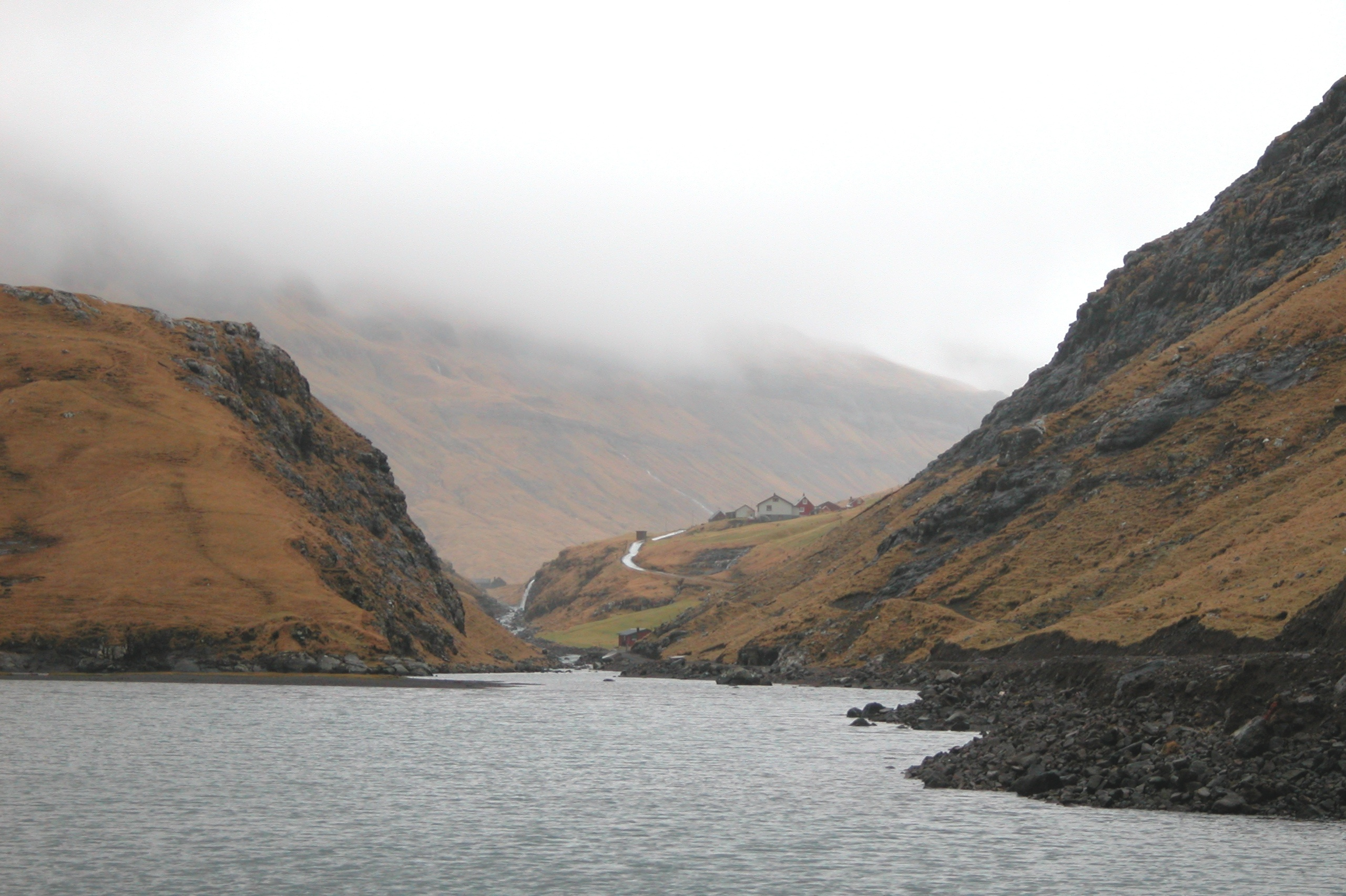
- View of Saksun from the lake

- Location in the Faroe Islands
- Coordinates: 62°14′56″N 7°10′33″W
- State: Kingdom of Denmark
- Constituent country: Faroe Islands
- Island: Streymoy
- Municipality: Sunda

Population (1 January 2006)
  - Total: 9
- Time zone: GMT
  - Summer (DST): UTC+1 (EST)
- Postal code: FO 436
- Climate: ET

Saksun is a village near the northwest coast of the Faroese island of Streymoy, in Sunda Municipality.

== Geography ==
Saksun lies in the bottom of what used to be an inlet of the sea, surrounded by high mountains. The inlet formed a good deep natural harbour, until a storm blocked it with sand. The old harbour became an inaccessible seawater lagoon, only accessible by small boats on high tide.

== Facilities ==
The village has a heritage farm called Dúvugarðar and a church. The church was originally built in Tjørnuvík, but in 1858 it was disassembled, carried over the mountains and reassembled in Saksun. The Museum occupies a seventeenth-century farm house called Dúvugarður. The house belongs to the Dúvugarður farm which is still an active sheep farm with approximately 710 ewes.

Due to a high number of tourists, a fee to visit the lagoon at Saksun was introduced in 2023.

== Gallery ==
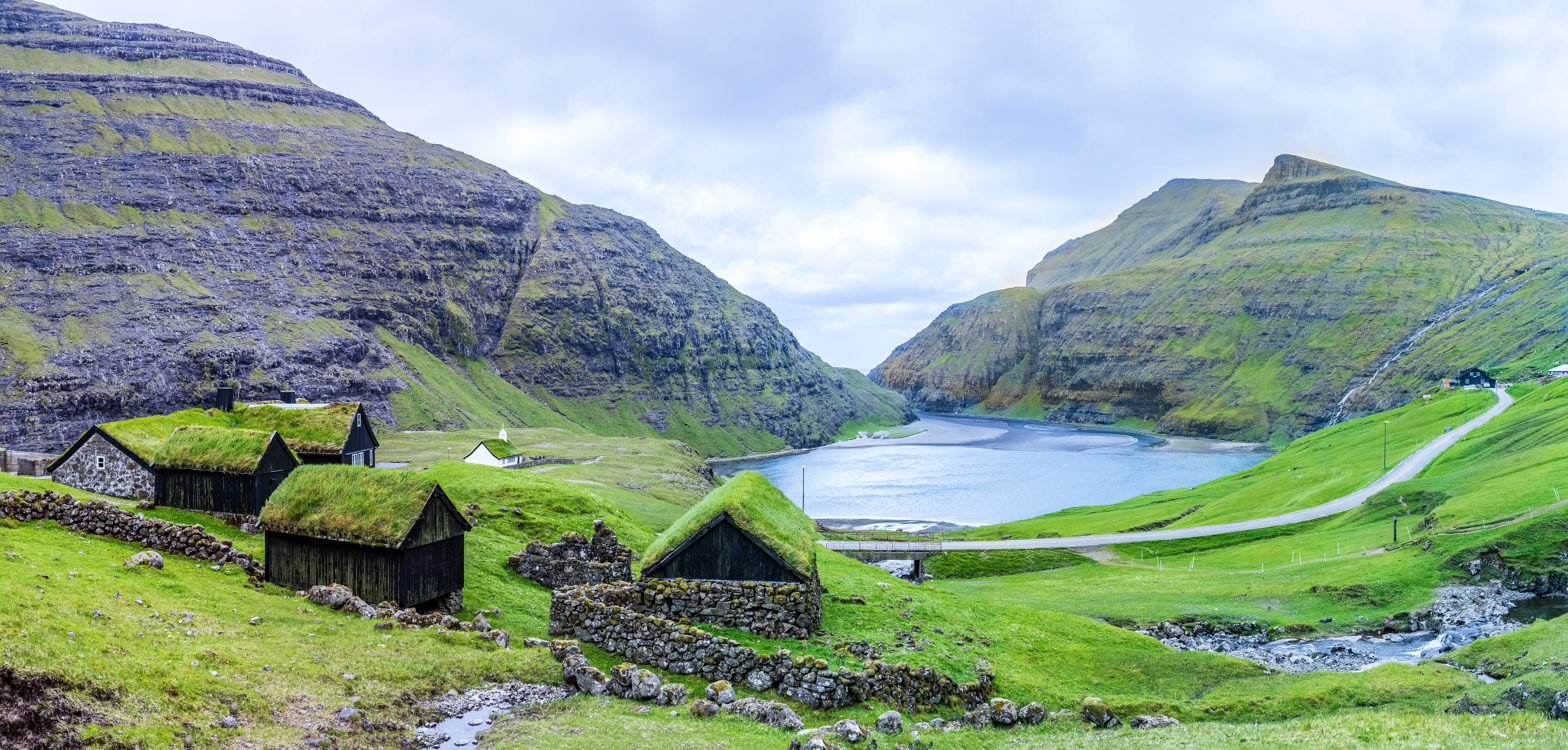

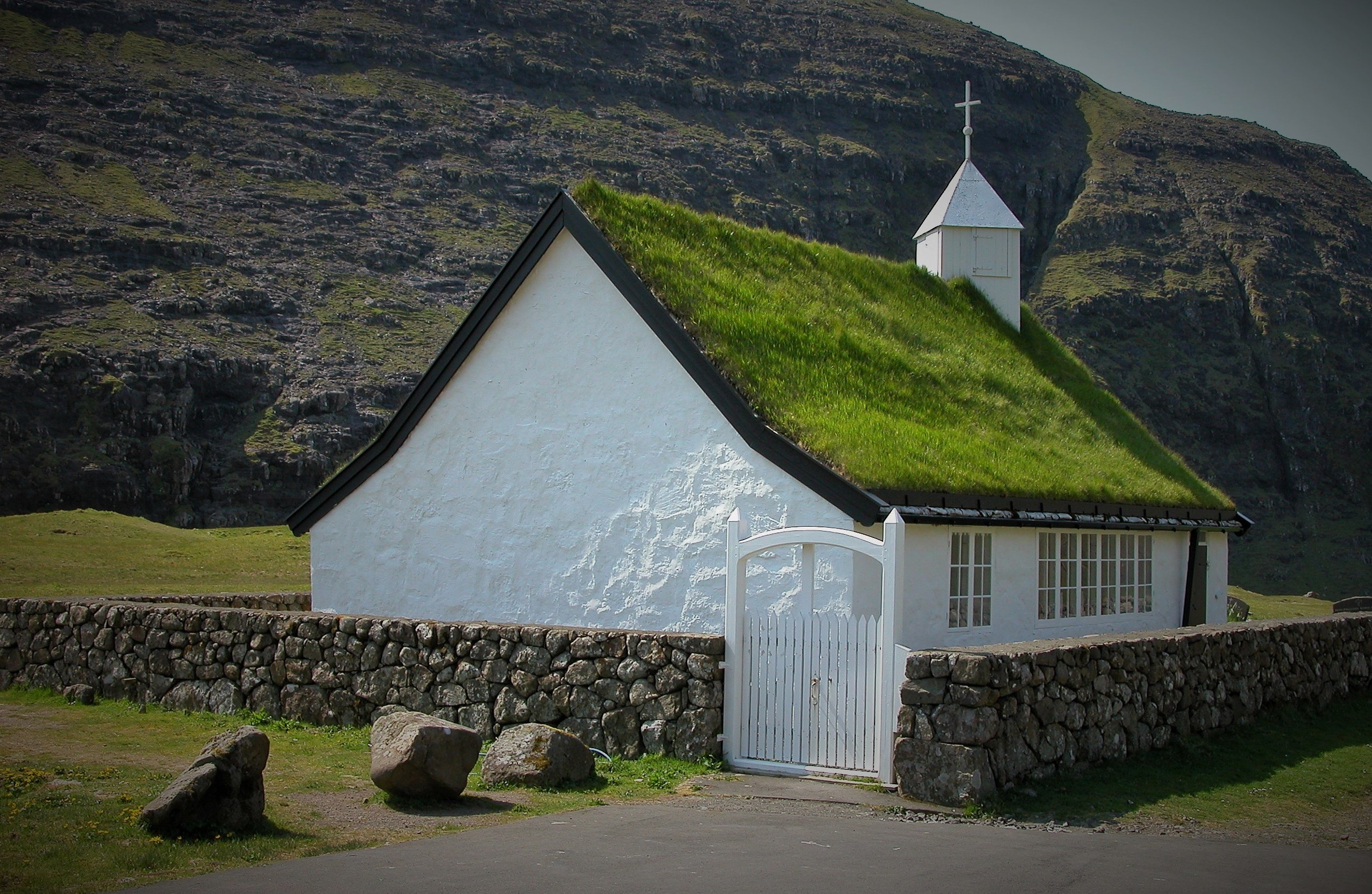
Church.

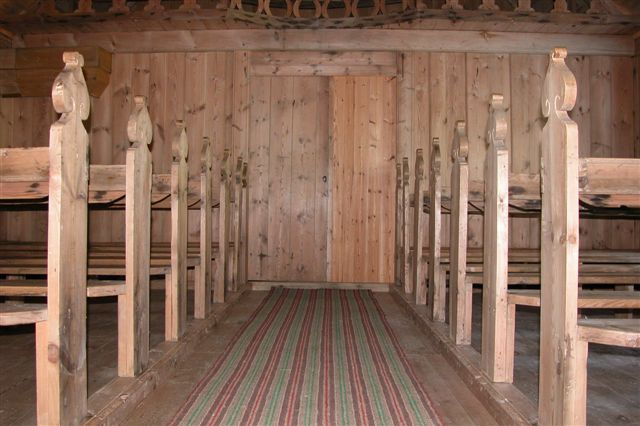
Interior of church

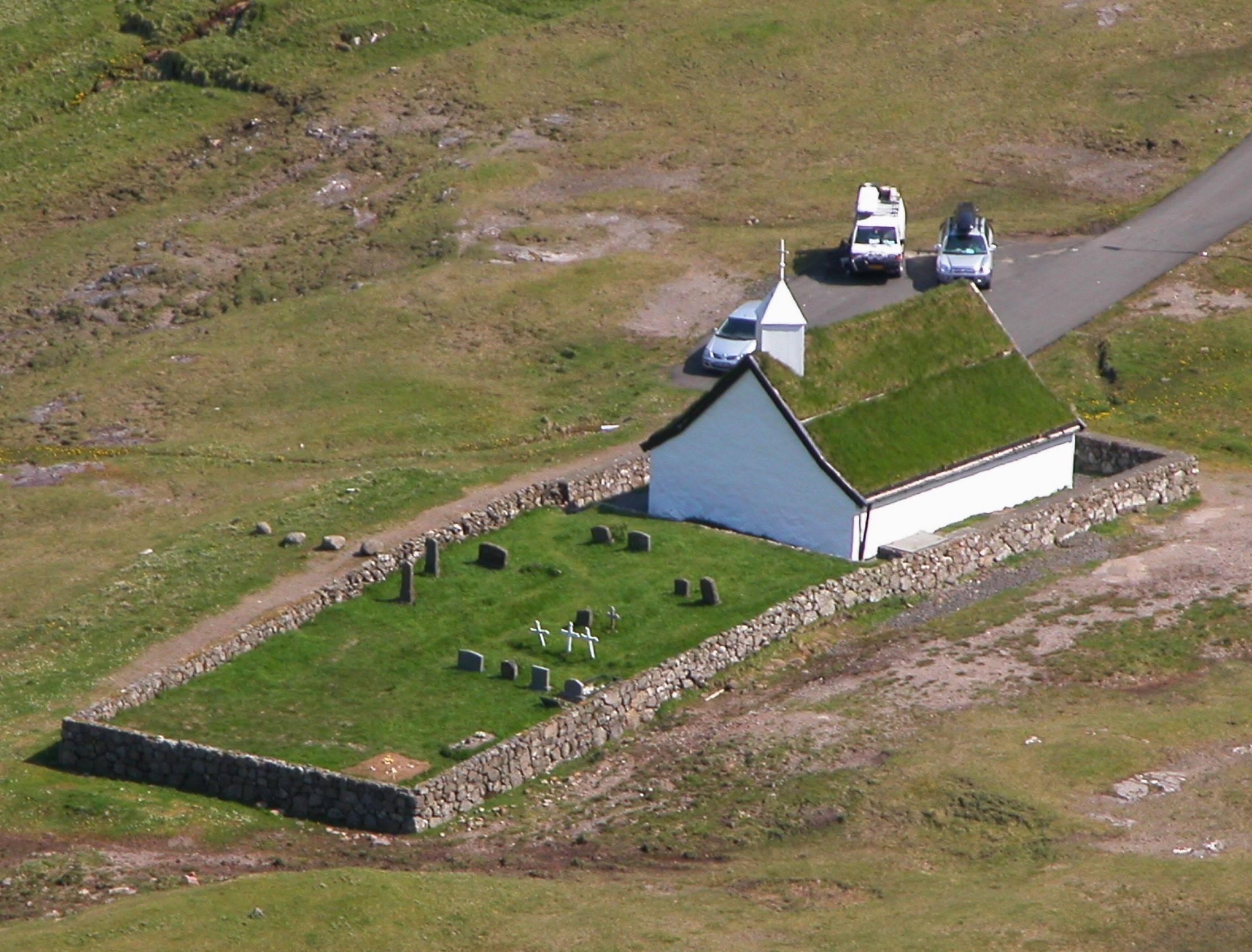
Church

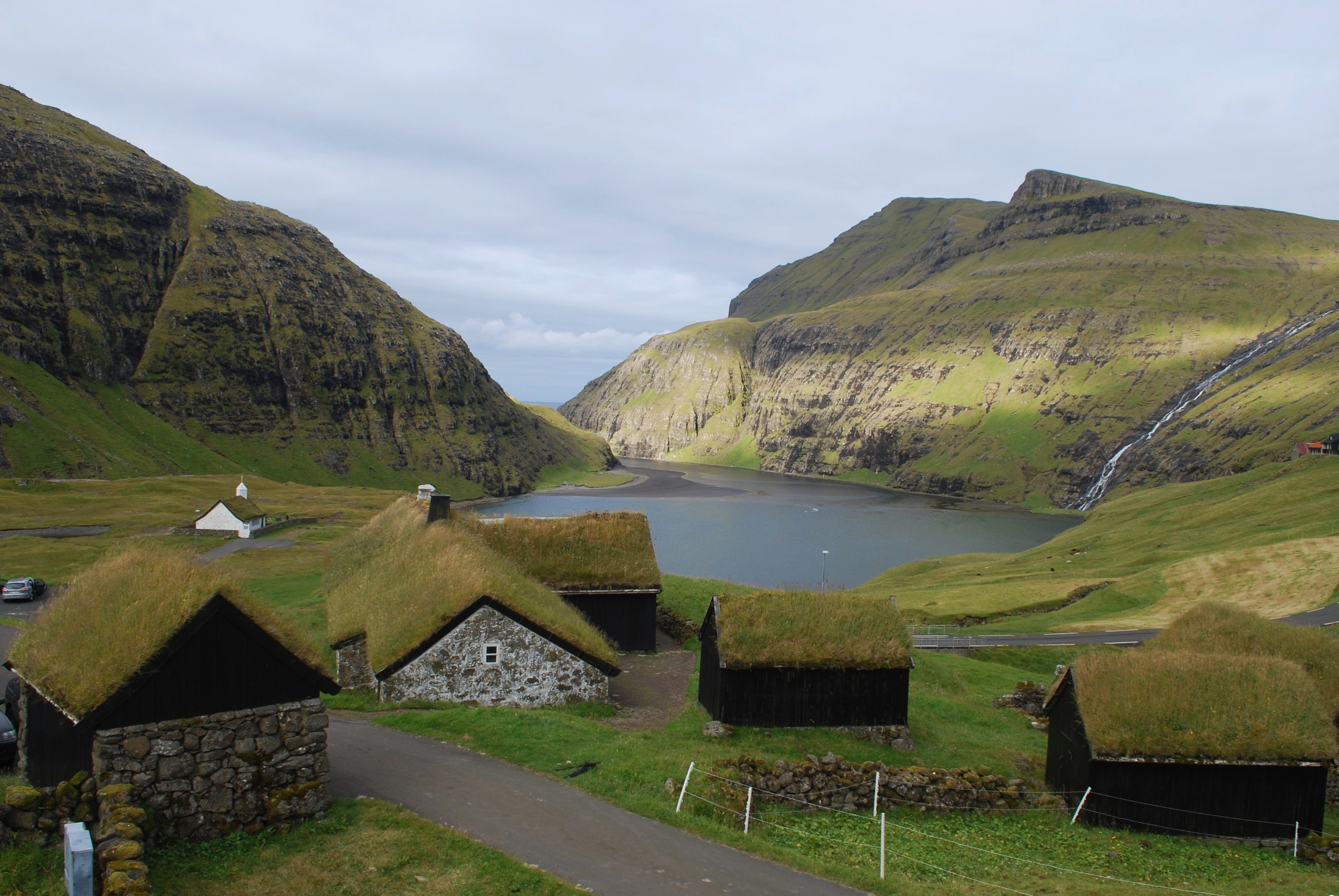
The old farm

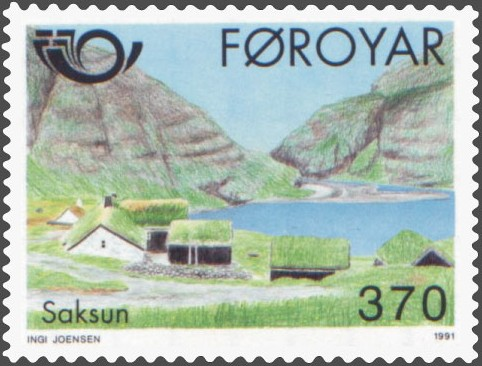
Saksun, Postverk Føroya

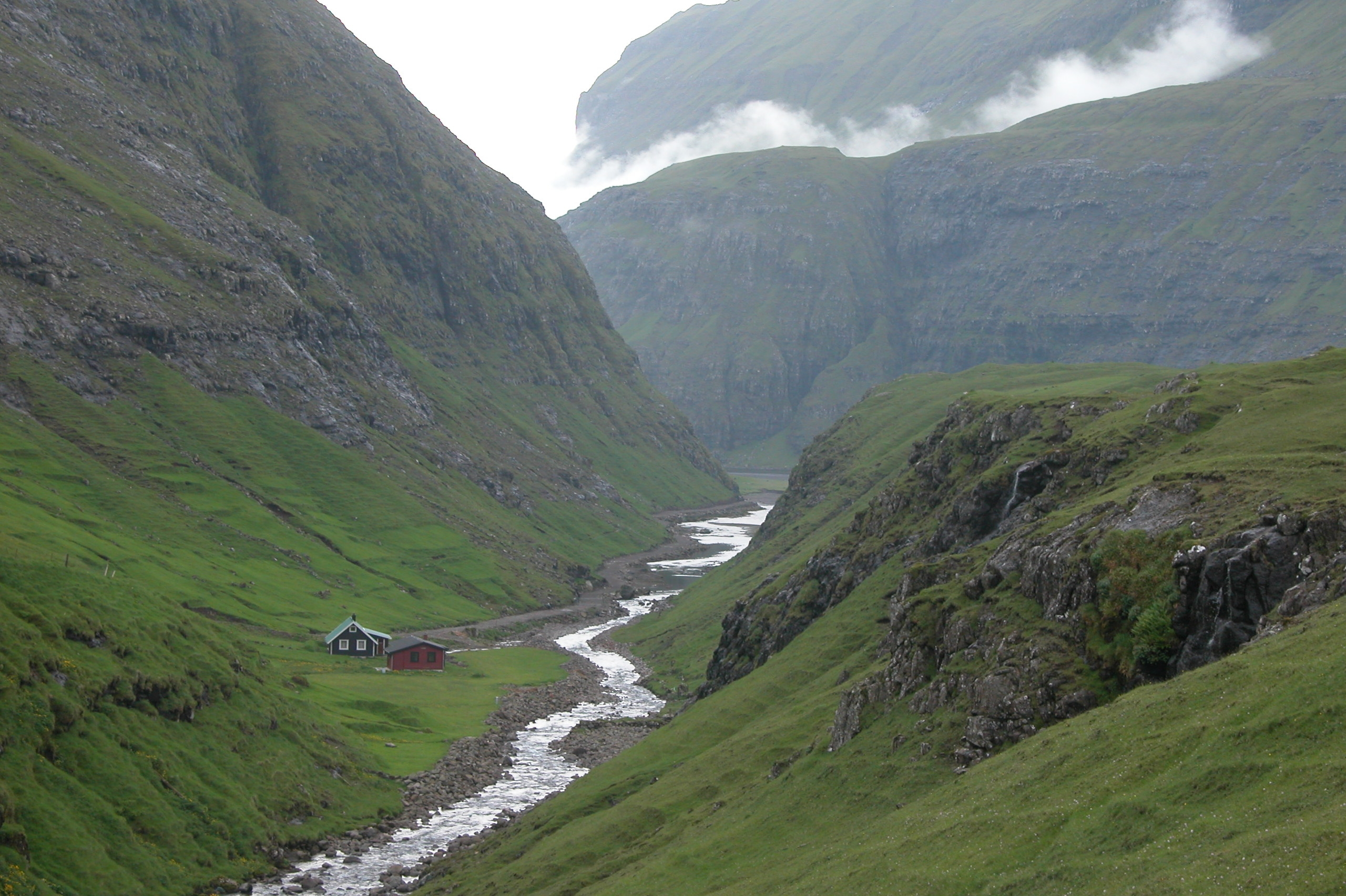
Down to the beach

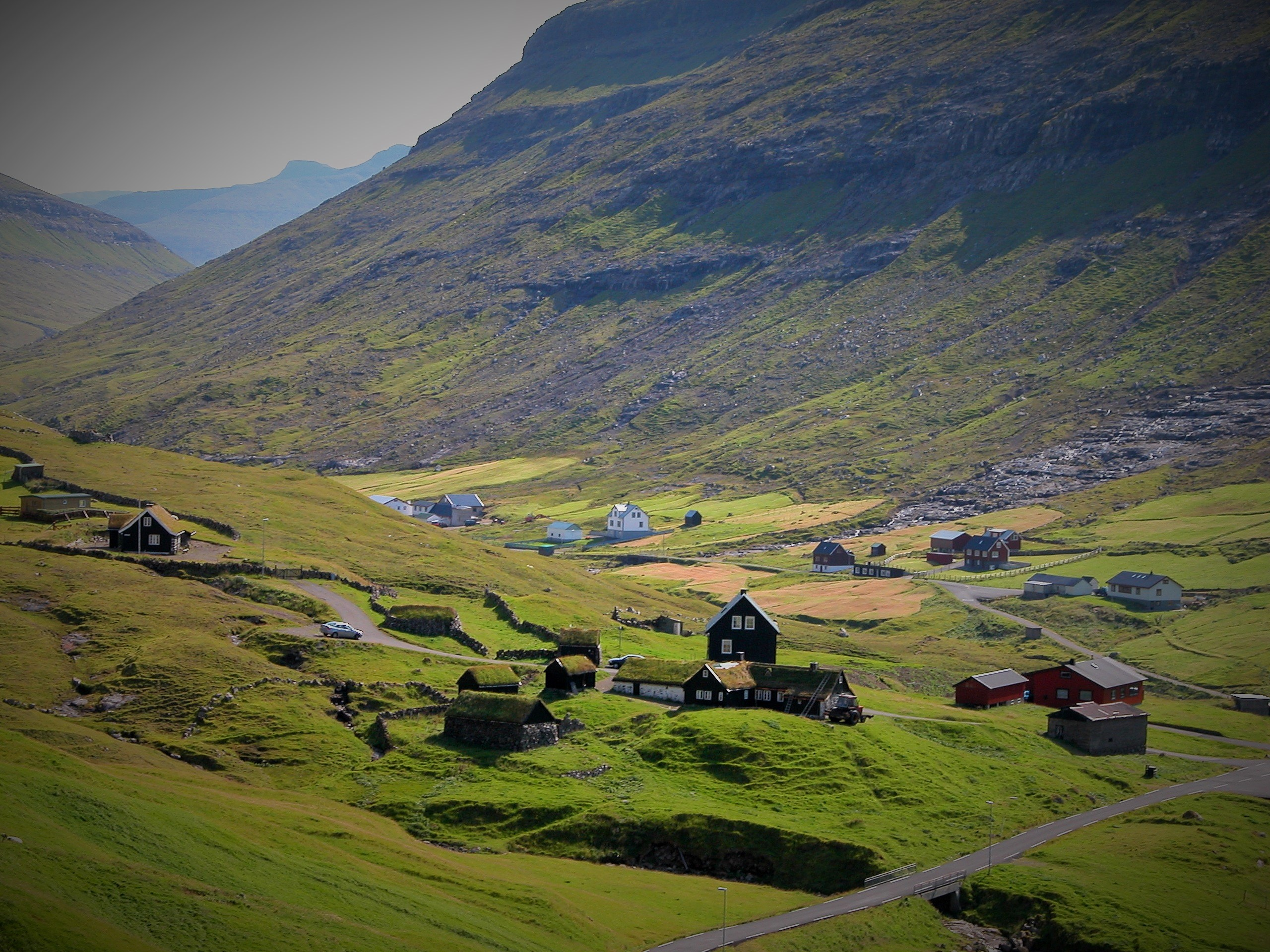
Saksun

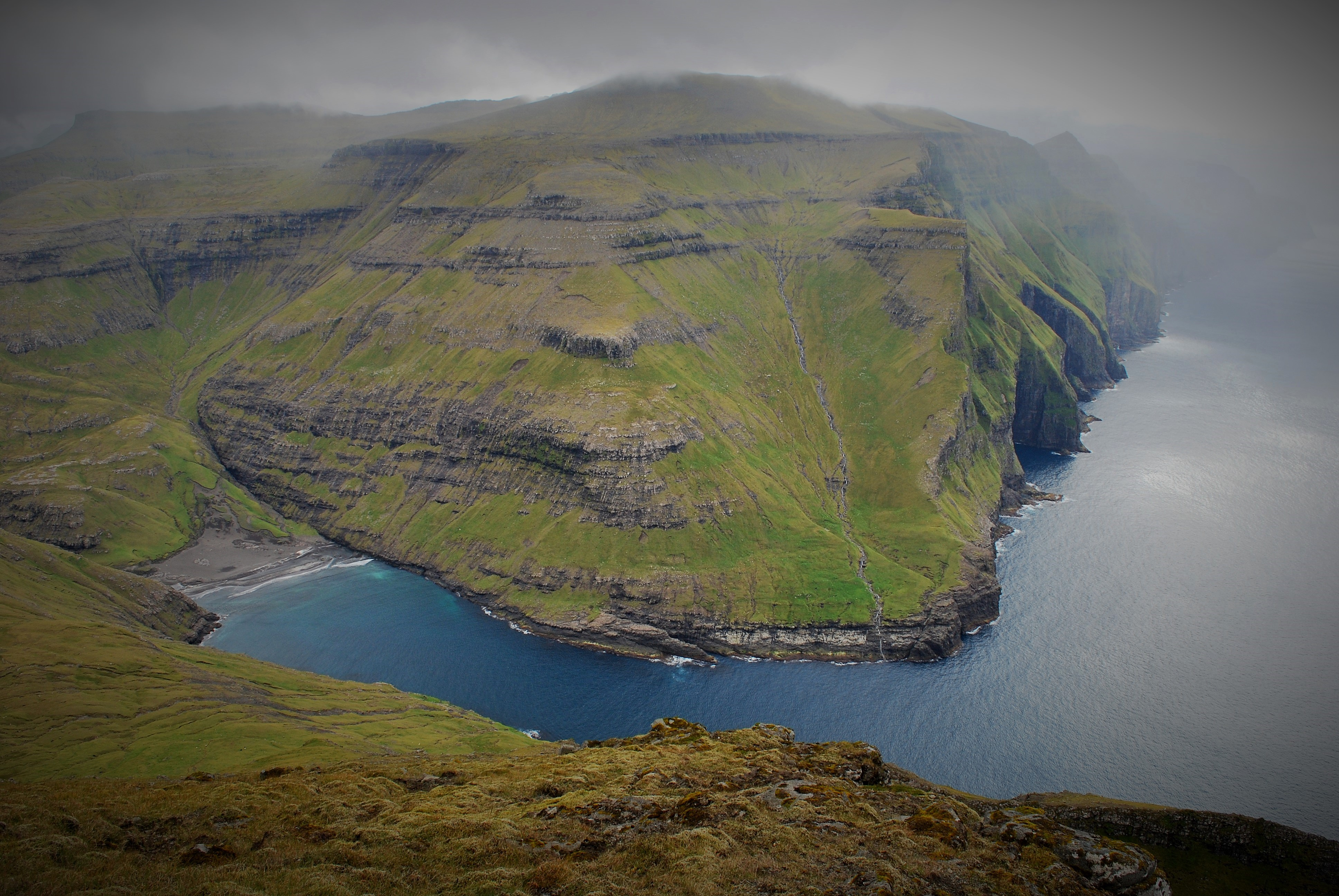
West coast

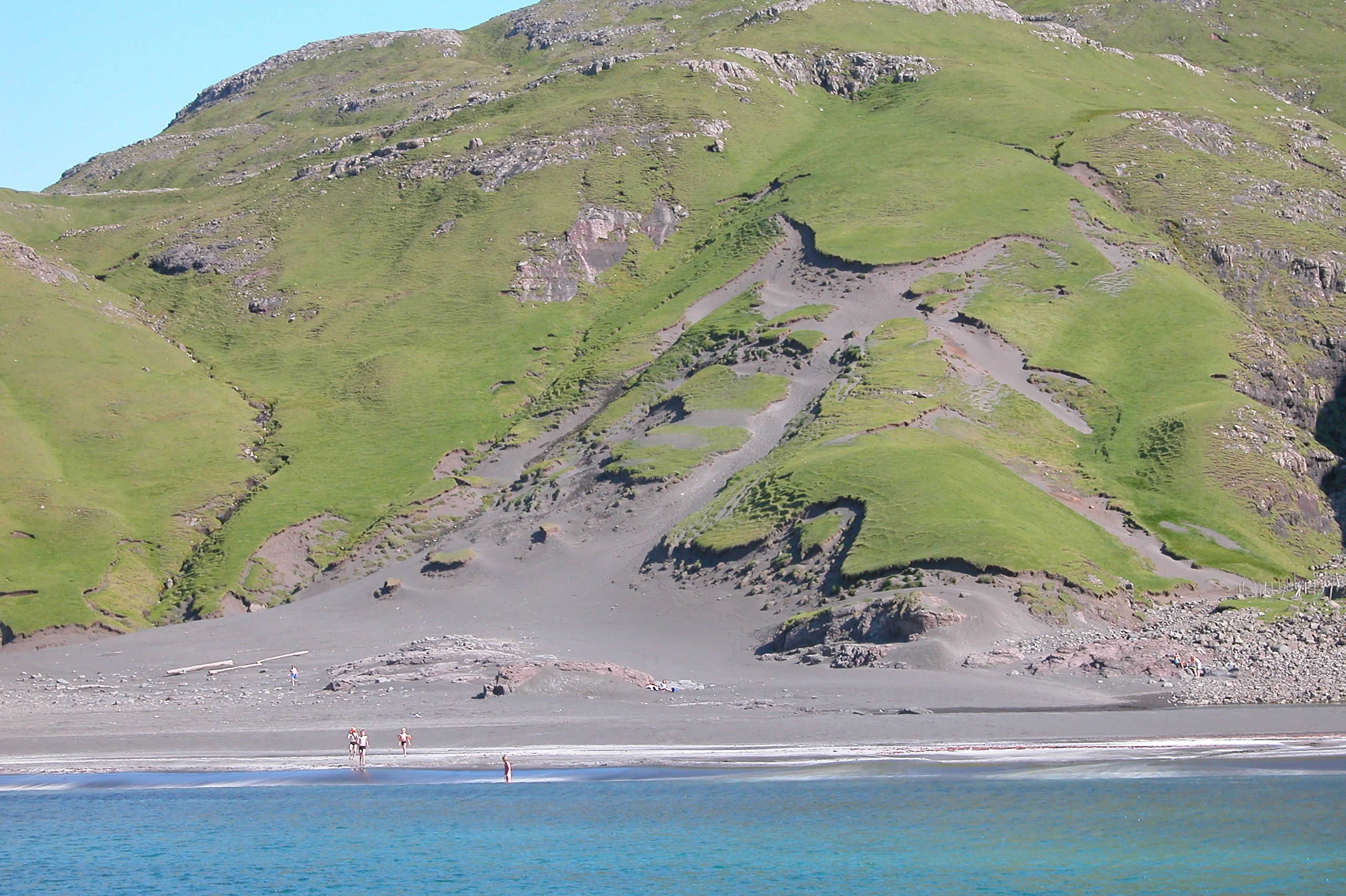
Beach

== See also ==
- List of towns in the Faroe Islands
