= Tjørnuvík =

Tjørnuvík Tjørnevig (Danish)
- Village
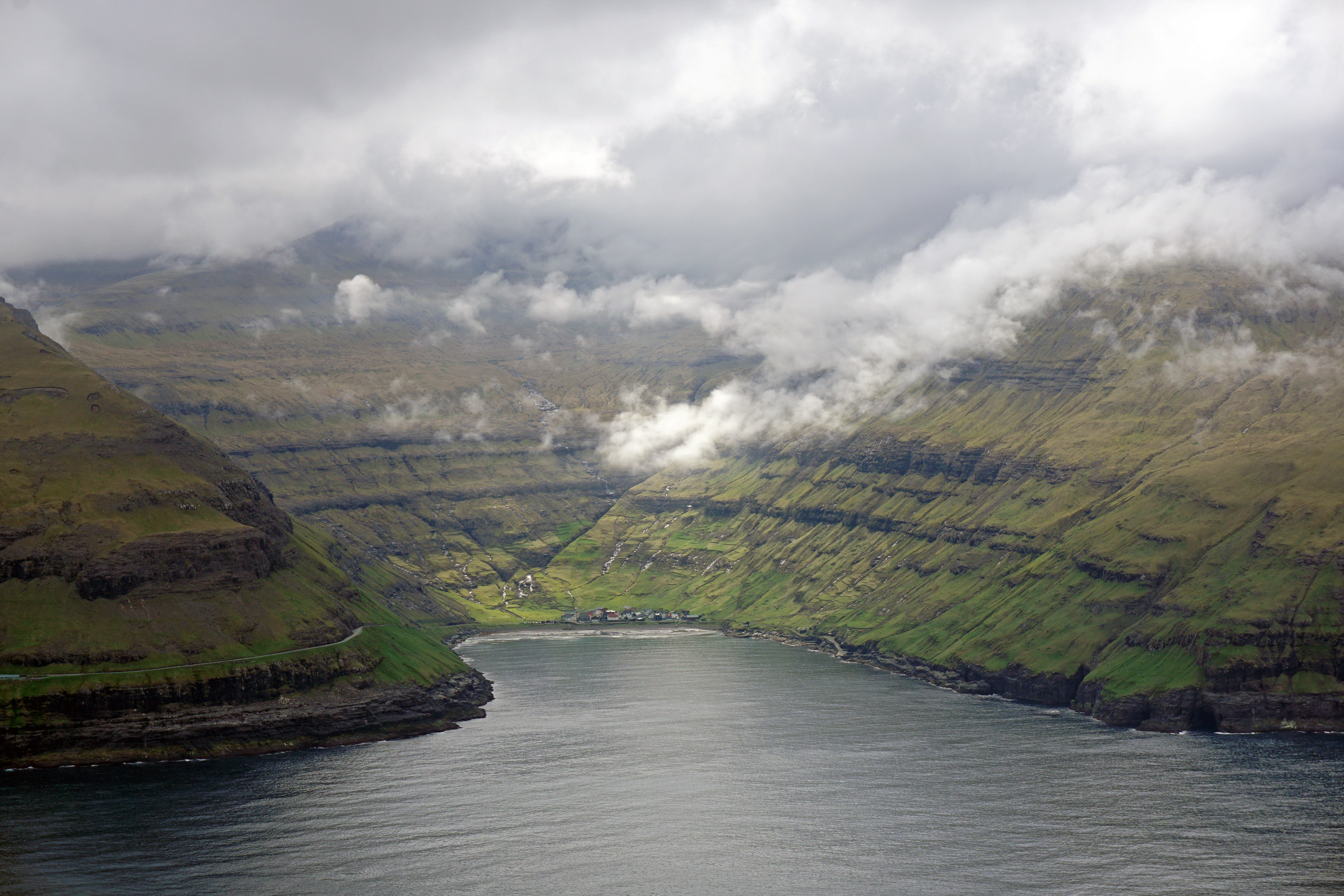
- Tjørnuvík seen from Eidiskollur.

- Location in the Faroe Islands
- Coordinates: 62°17′17″N 7°8′27″W
- Country: Faroe Islands
- Island: Streymoy
- Municipality: Sunda

Population (September 2025)
  - Total: 44
- Time zone: GMT
  - Summer (DST): UTC+1 (EST)
- Postal code: FO 445
- Climate: ET

Tjørnuvík (/ˈt͡ʃʰœtnʊˌʋuɪk/, Danish: Tjørnevig) is the northernmost village on Streymoy in Sunda Municipality, Faroe Islands. As of the 2006 census, the population has a total of 71 people.

The town uses the Stakkur sea stack for sheep grazing, accessed by cable car. The Risin og Kellingin sea stacks are visible across the Sundini strait.

A 5 km (3 mi) single-lane dead-end road (route 594) from Haldórsvík is the only way to reach Tjørnuvík. Tourists clogged the road in summer, before a traffic control system improved conditions in 2022. Funding was approved for prestudies for a tunnel.

== Gallery ==
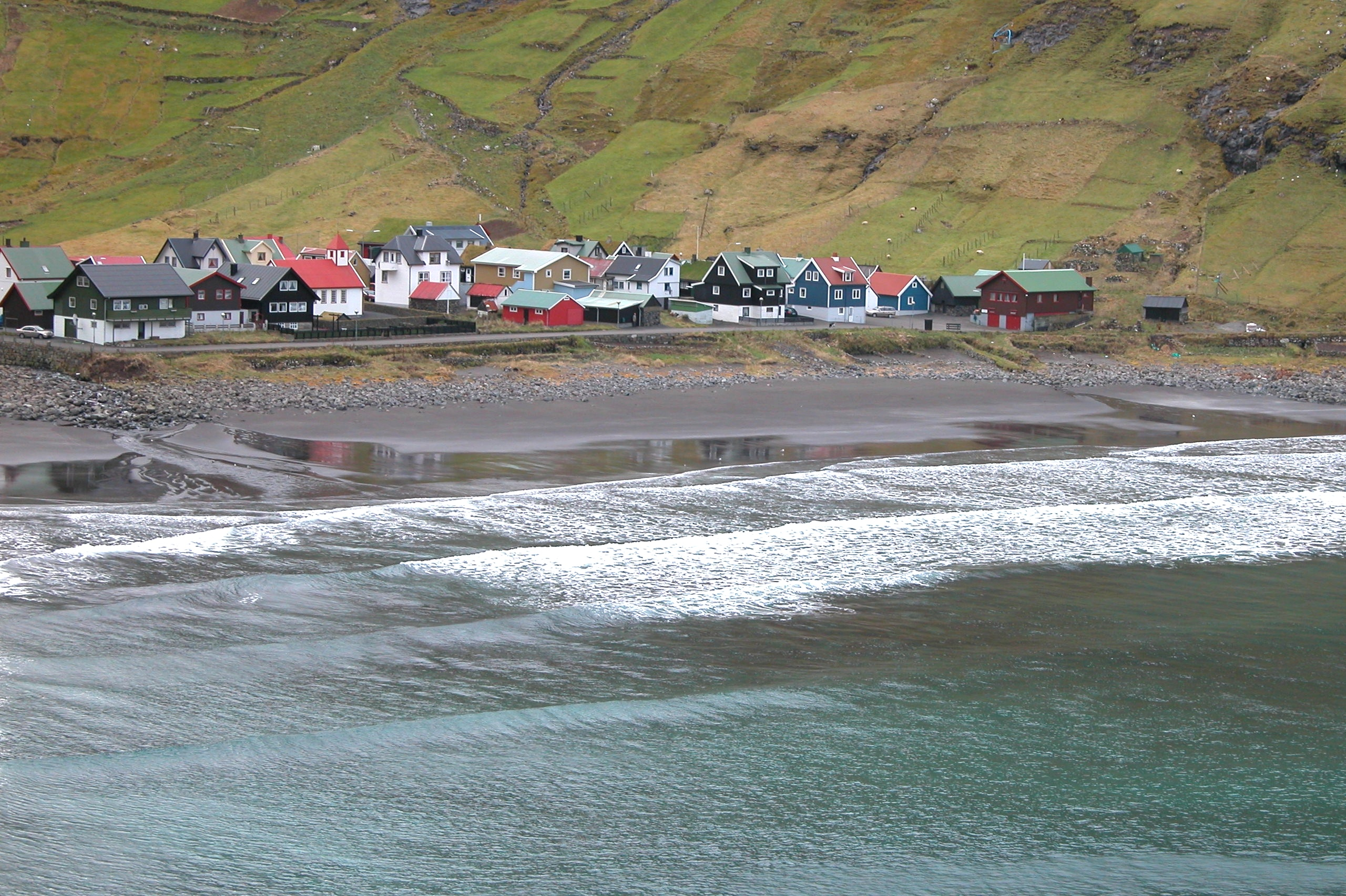

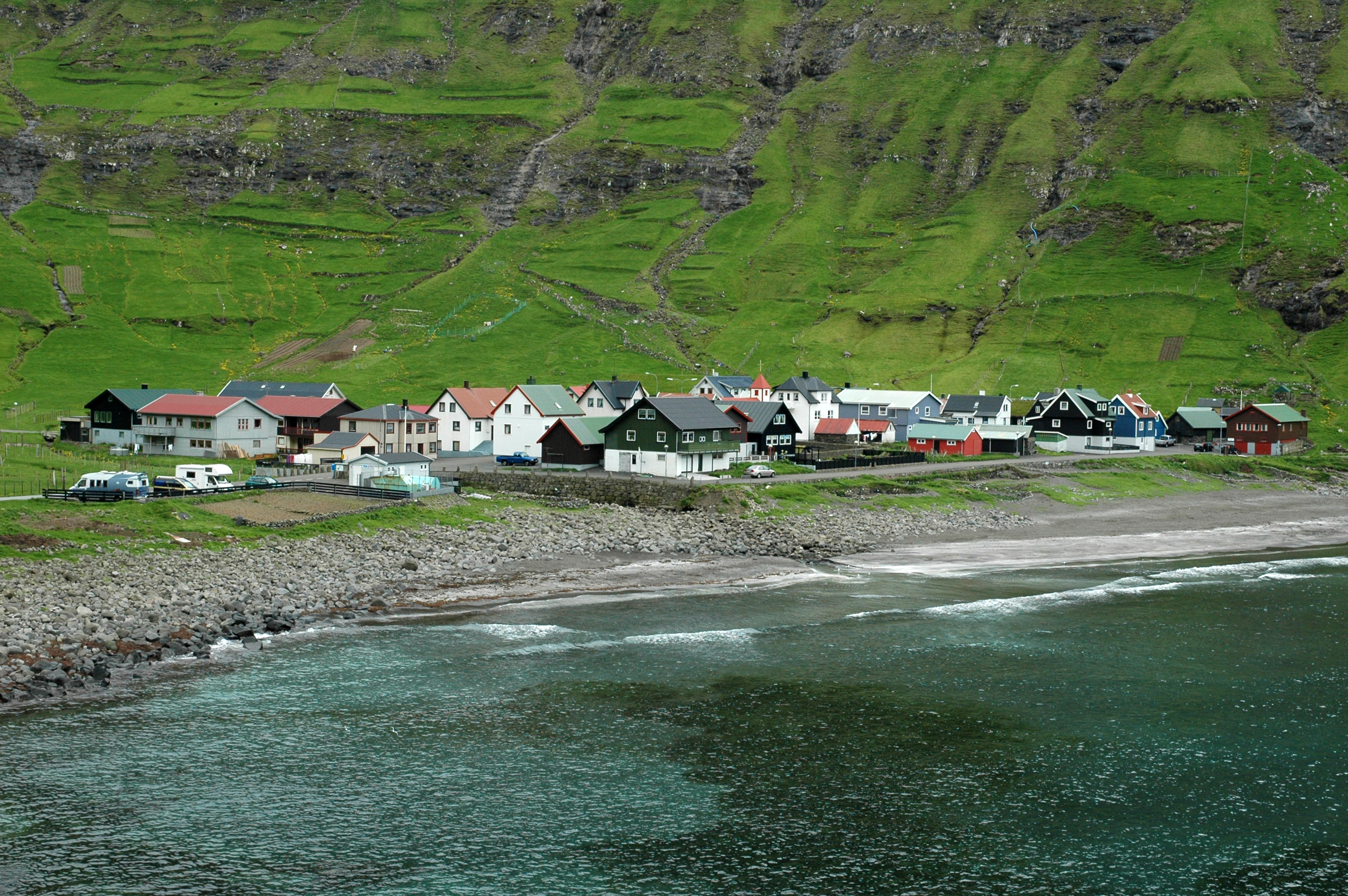

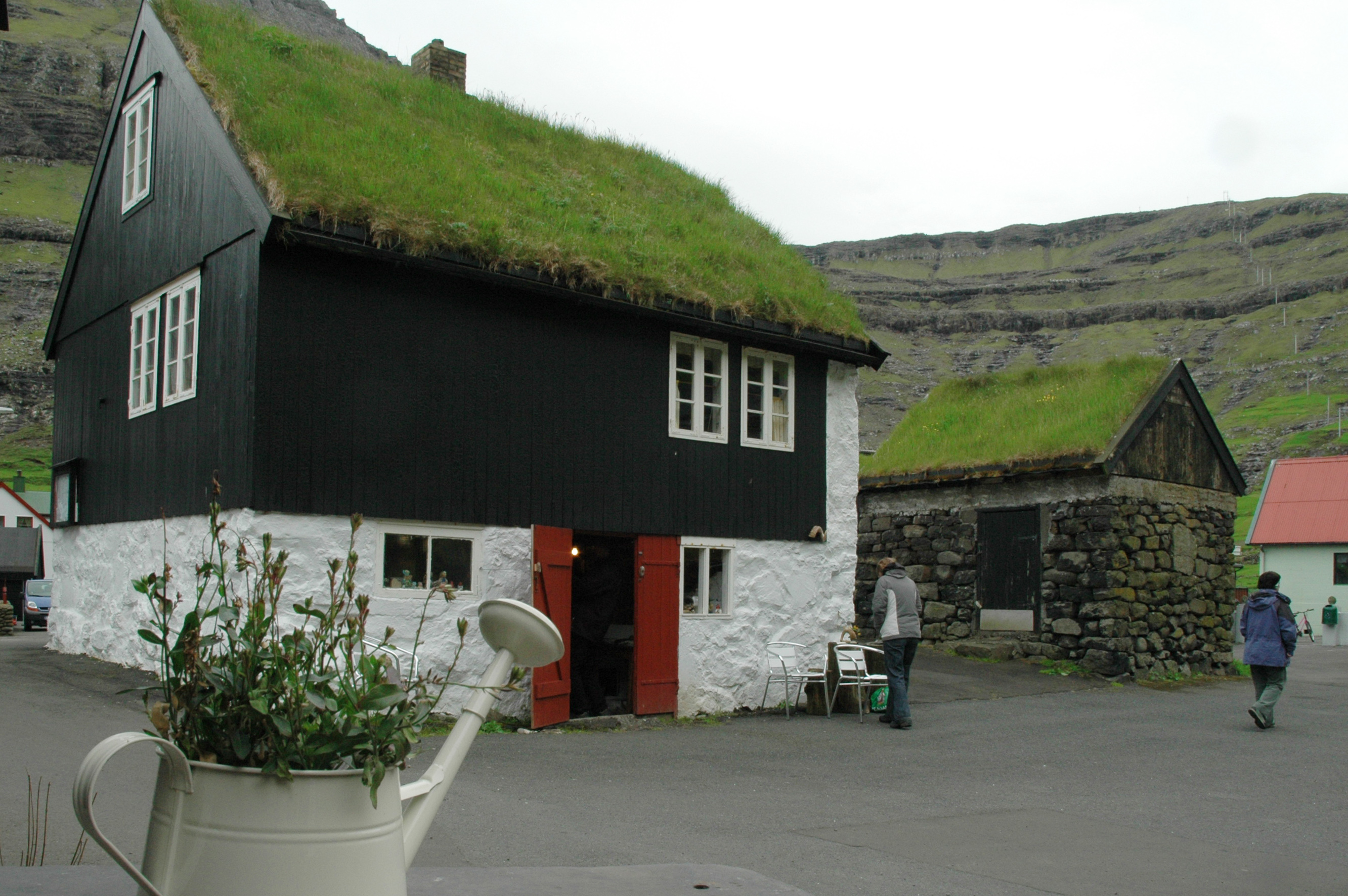

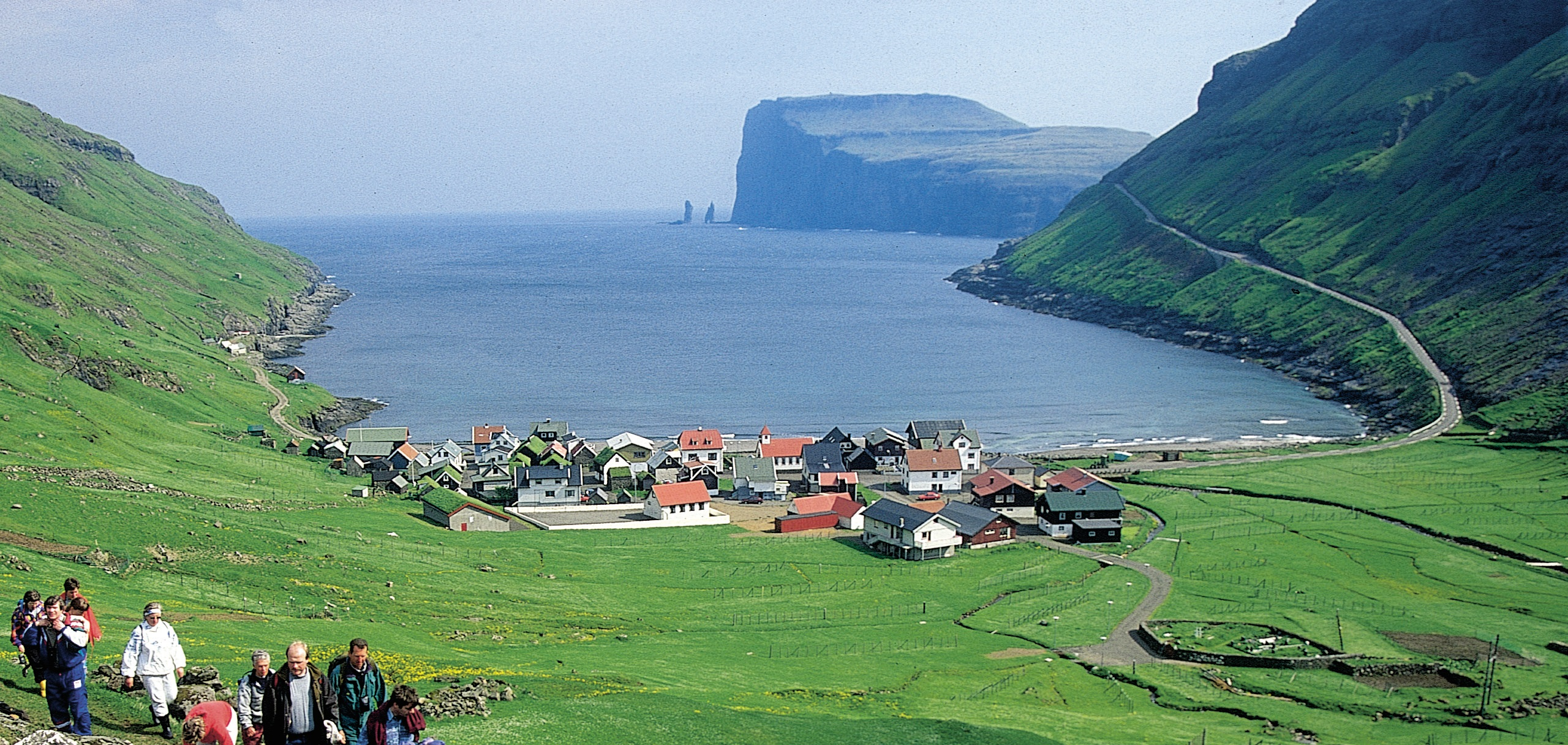

== See also ==
- Towns of the Faroe Islands
