= Haldórsvík =

Haldórsvík Haldersvig (Danish)
- Village
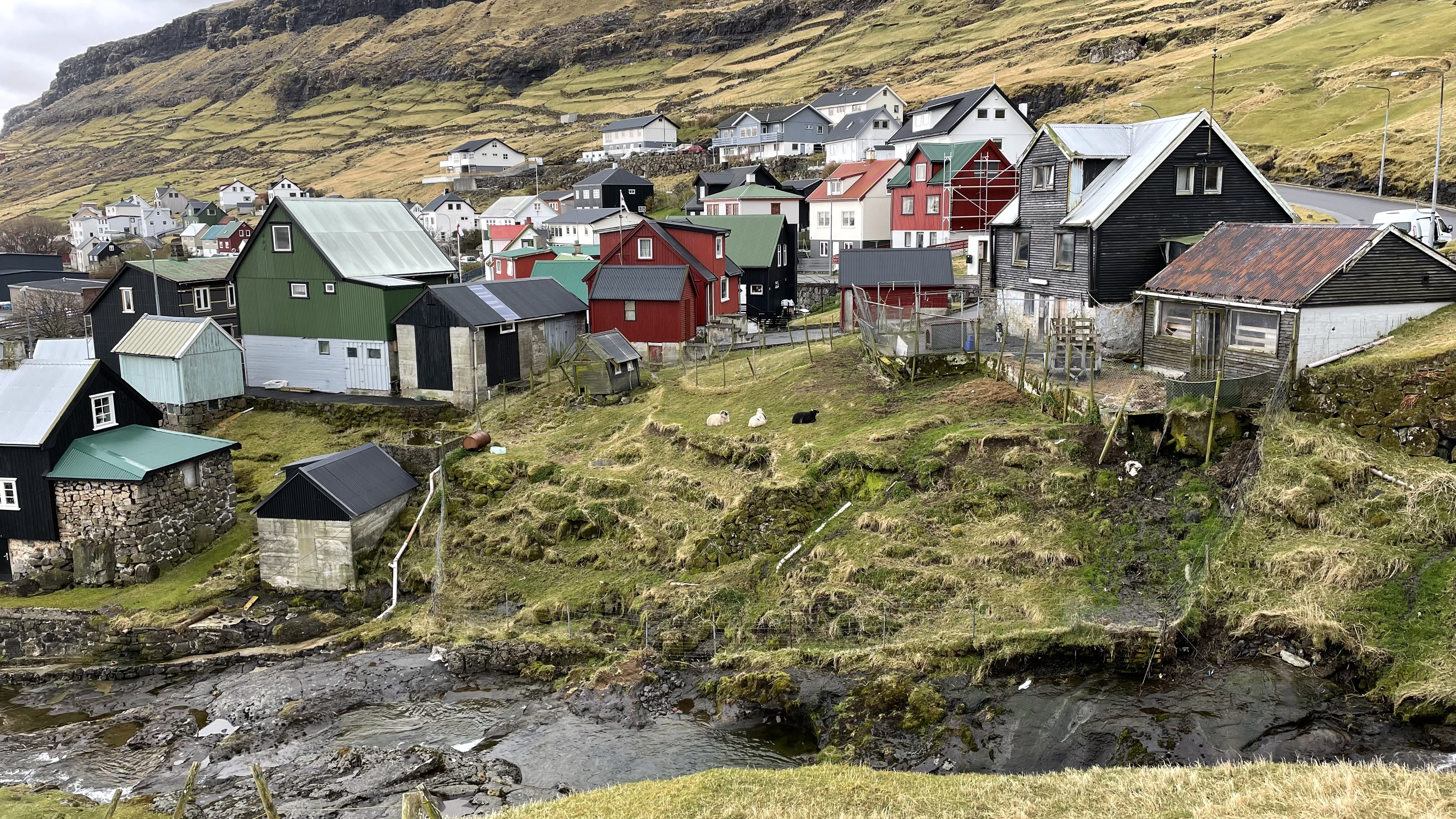
- Haldórsvík

- Location in the Faroe Islands
- Coordinates: 62°16′33″N 7°5′31″W
- State: Kingdom of Denmark
- Constituent country: Faroe Islands
- Island: Streymoy
- Municipality: Sunda

Population (September 2025)
  - Total: 120
- Time zone: GMT
  - Summer (DST): UTC+1 (EST)
- Postal code: FO 440
- Climate: Cfc

Haldórsvík (Danish: Haldersvig), also Haldarsvík, is a village located on the north-east coast of Streymoy in the Sunda Kommuna municipality. In the centre of the village there is a small waterfall.

The stone church in the village is from 1856. It is the only octagonal church on the Faroe Islands. The altarpiece is also distinctive. It represents the Last Supper, with the Apostles' faces replaced by the faces of living public figures from the Faroe Islands.

== Gallery ==
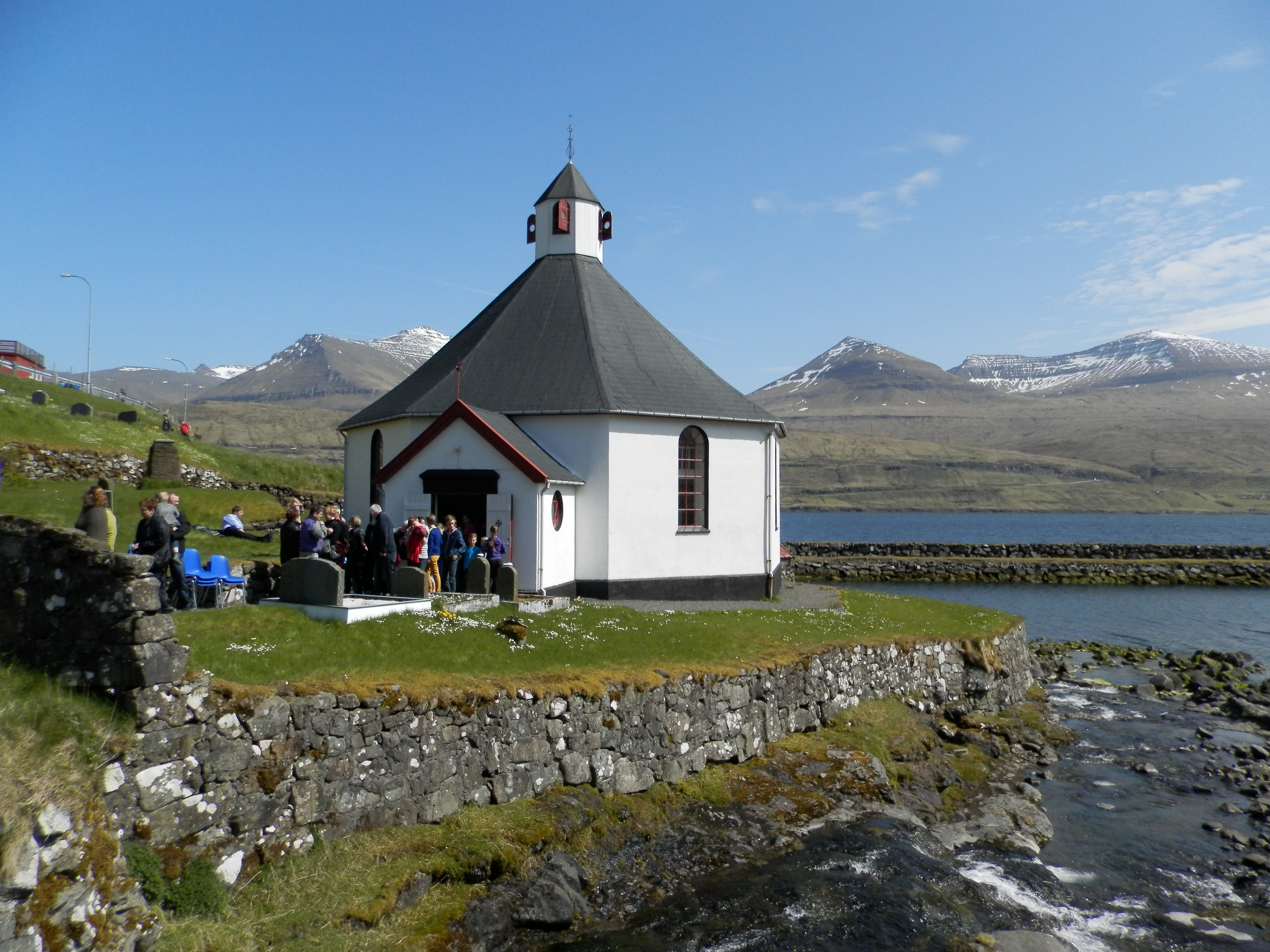
The octagonal church in Haldórsvík

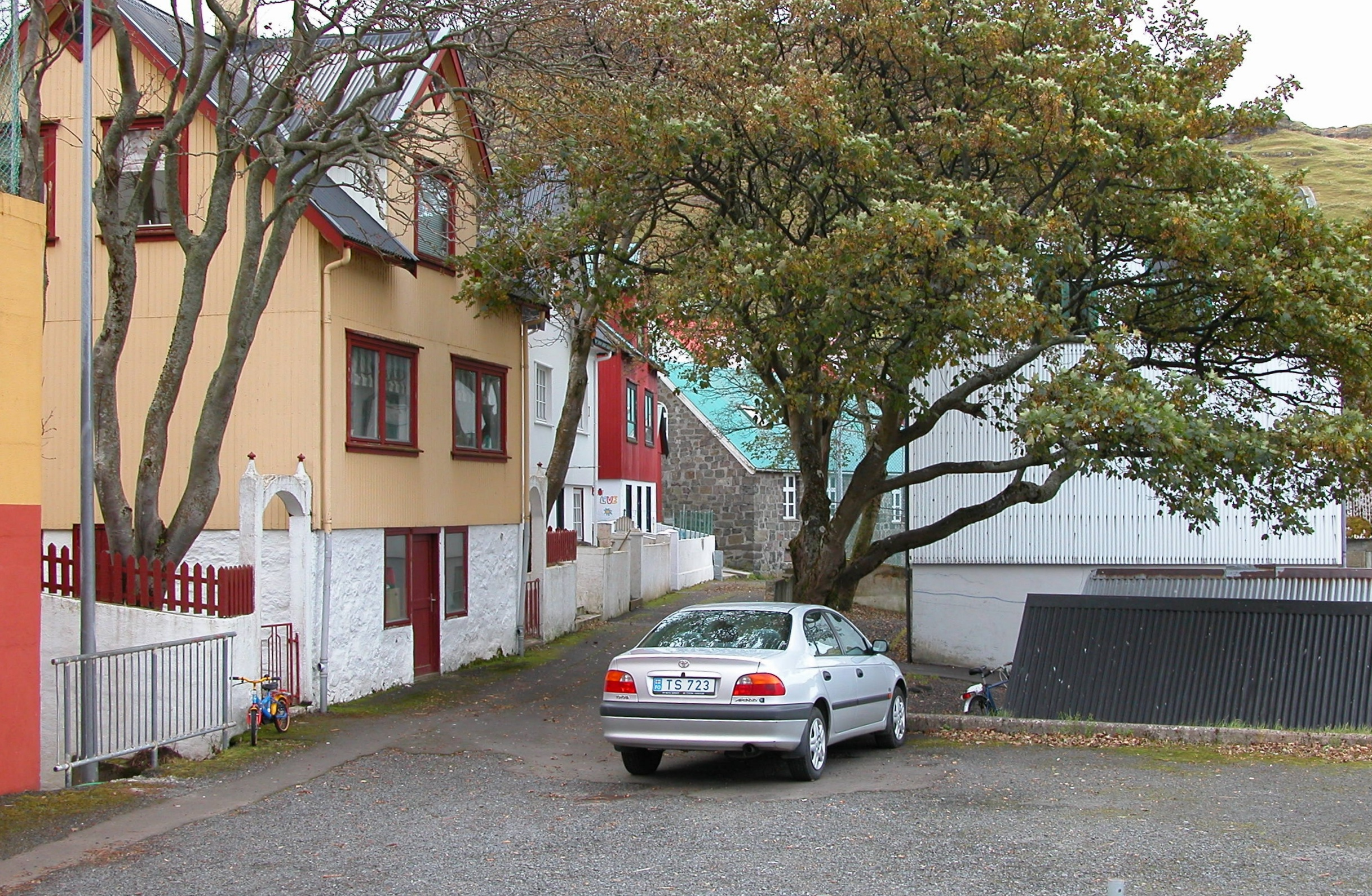
Haldórsvík

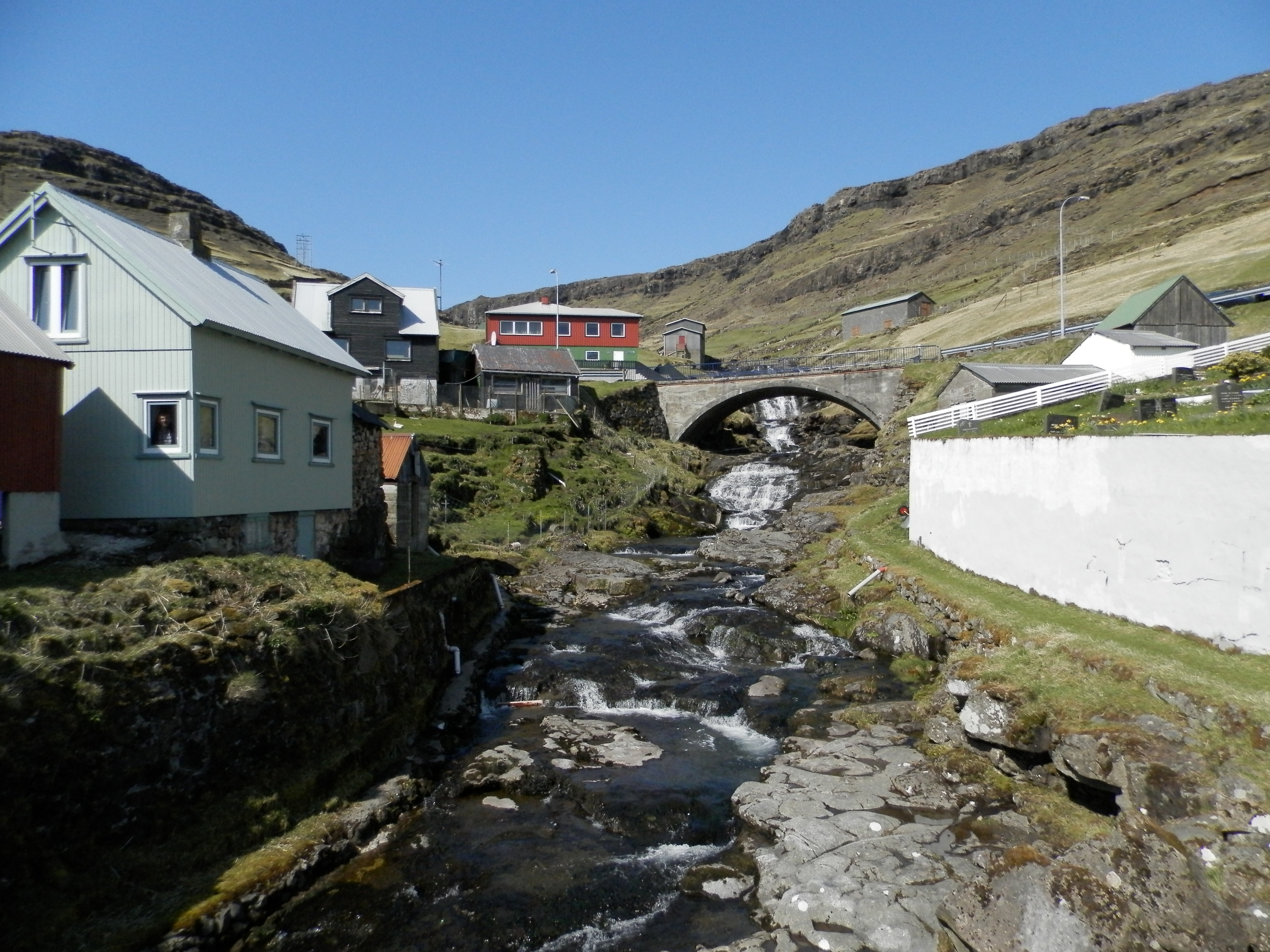
A river and a bridge in Haldórsvík

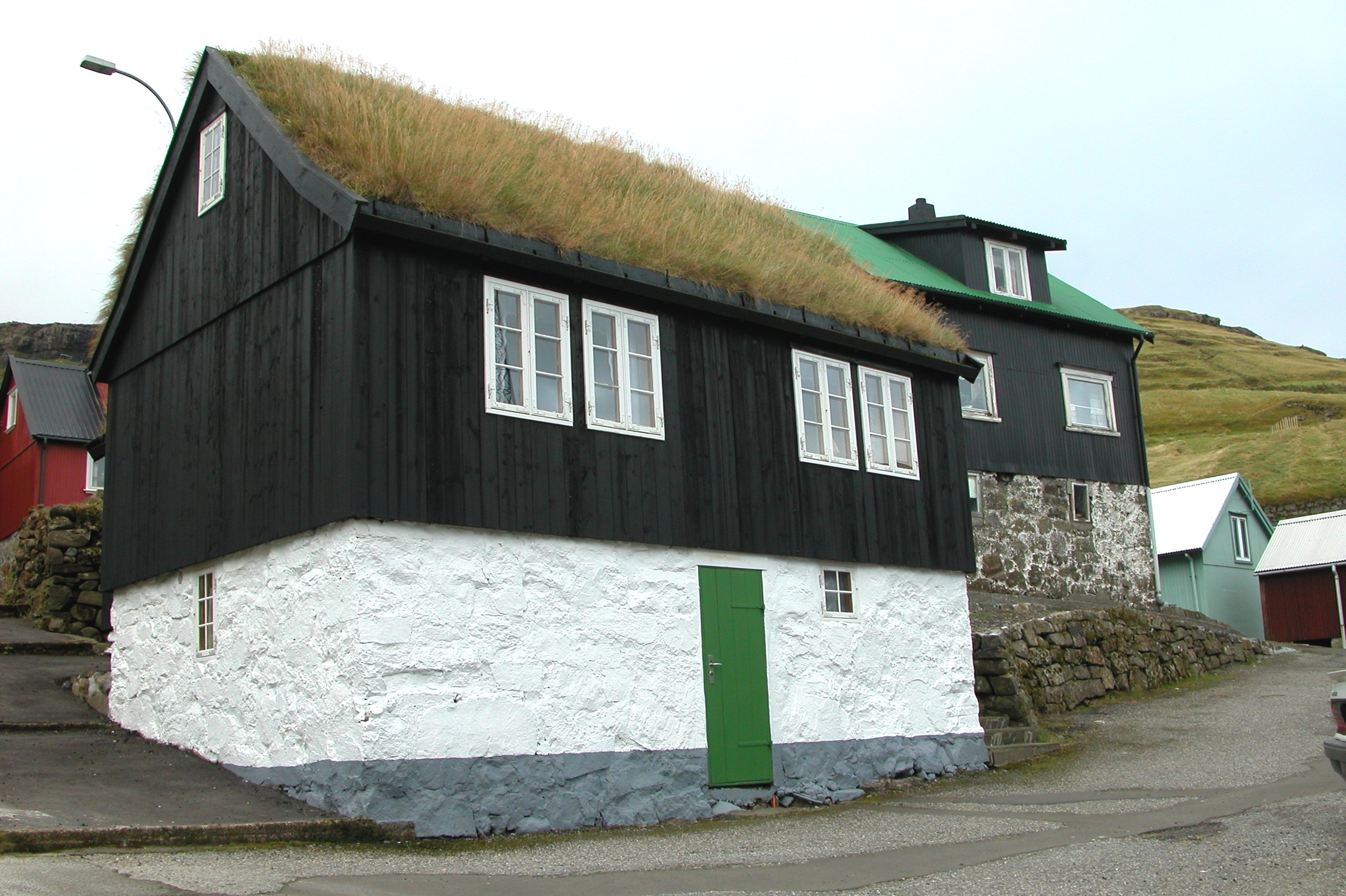
A house in Haldórsvík with turf roof

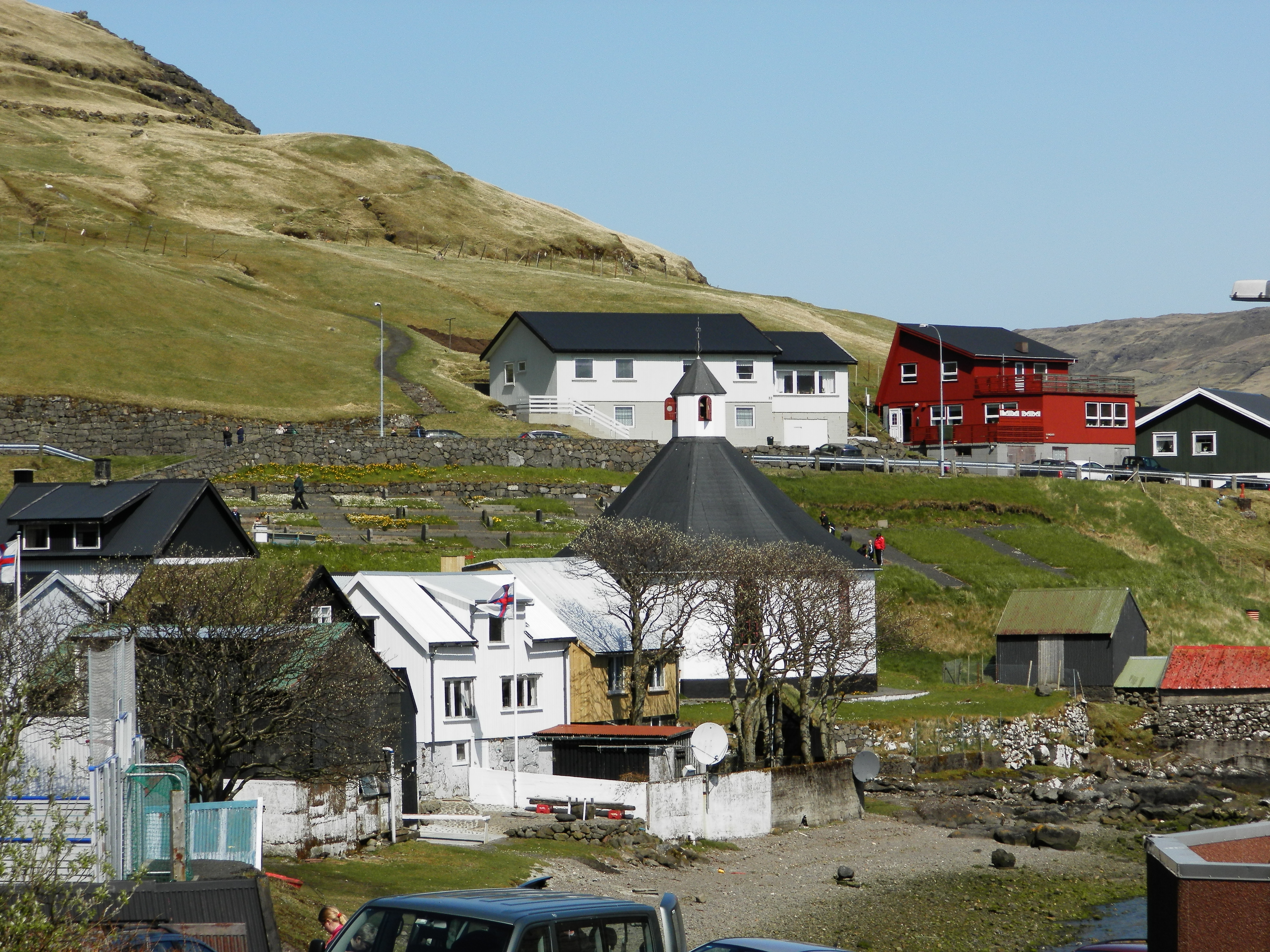
A view of Haldórsvík,
with the church at centre

== See also ==
- List of towns in the Faroe Islands
