= Stakkurin =

Sea stack on the island of Streymoy, Faroe Islands

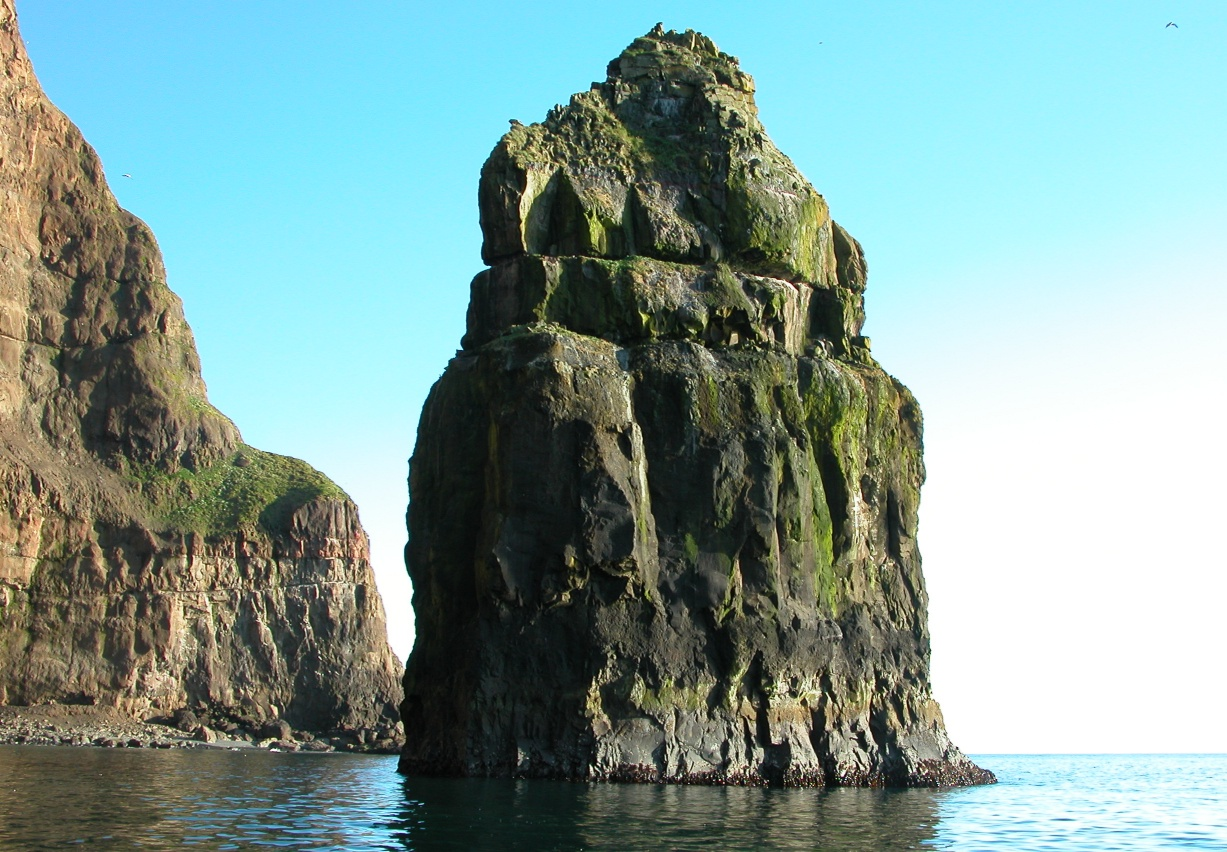

Stakkurin is the sea stack at the northernmost point of the island of Streymoy in the Faroe Islands. The owners of Stakkurin have sheep farming on top of the sea stack, and once a year they go out and bring back the sheep and sell them at an auction in the village Tjørnuvík. The money from auction goes to benefit the whole community, such as the community house.

The sea stack can be reached by a cable from Streymoy.
