= Denais Stack =

Denais Stack (62°8′S 58°30′W) is a conspicuous rock stack lying 1.5 nautical miles (3 km) north of Point Thomas on the west side of Admiralty Bay, King George Island, in the South Shetland Islands. The name "Anse Denais," for one of the seamen on the Pourquoi-Pas?, was given by the French Antarctic Expedition, 1908–10, under [ cove in this position and the name Denais has been transferred to the feature now described in order to preserve Charcot's naming in the area.
