= Risin og Kellingin =

Two sea stacks in the Faroe Islands

Coordinates: 62°19′N 7°06′W

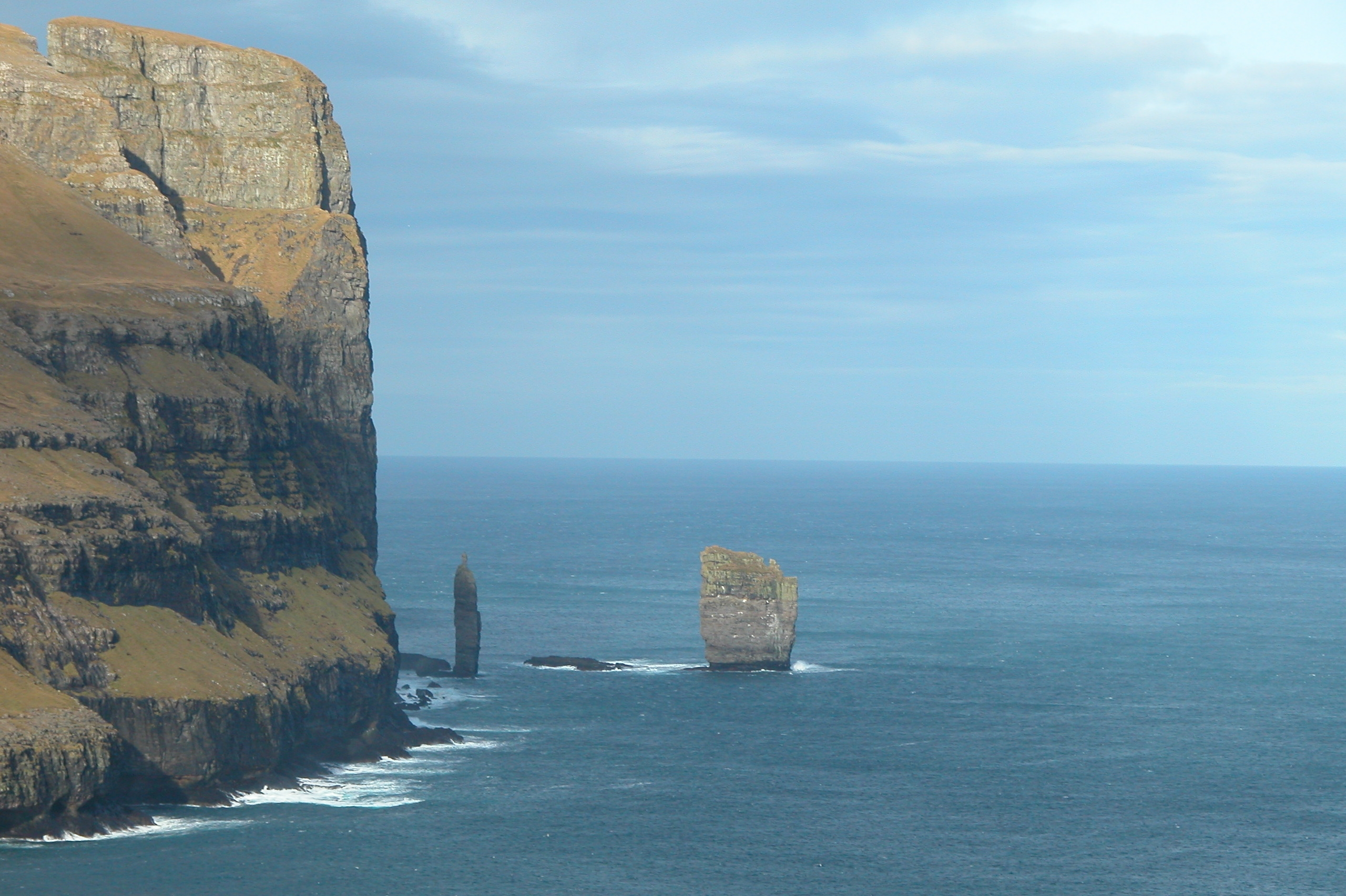
Risin og Kellingin just off the coast of Eysturoy.

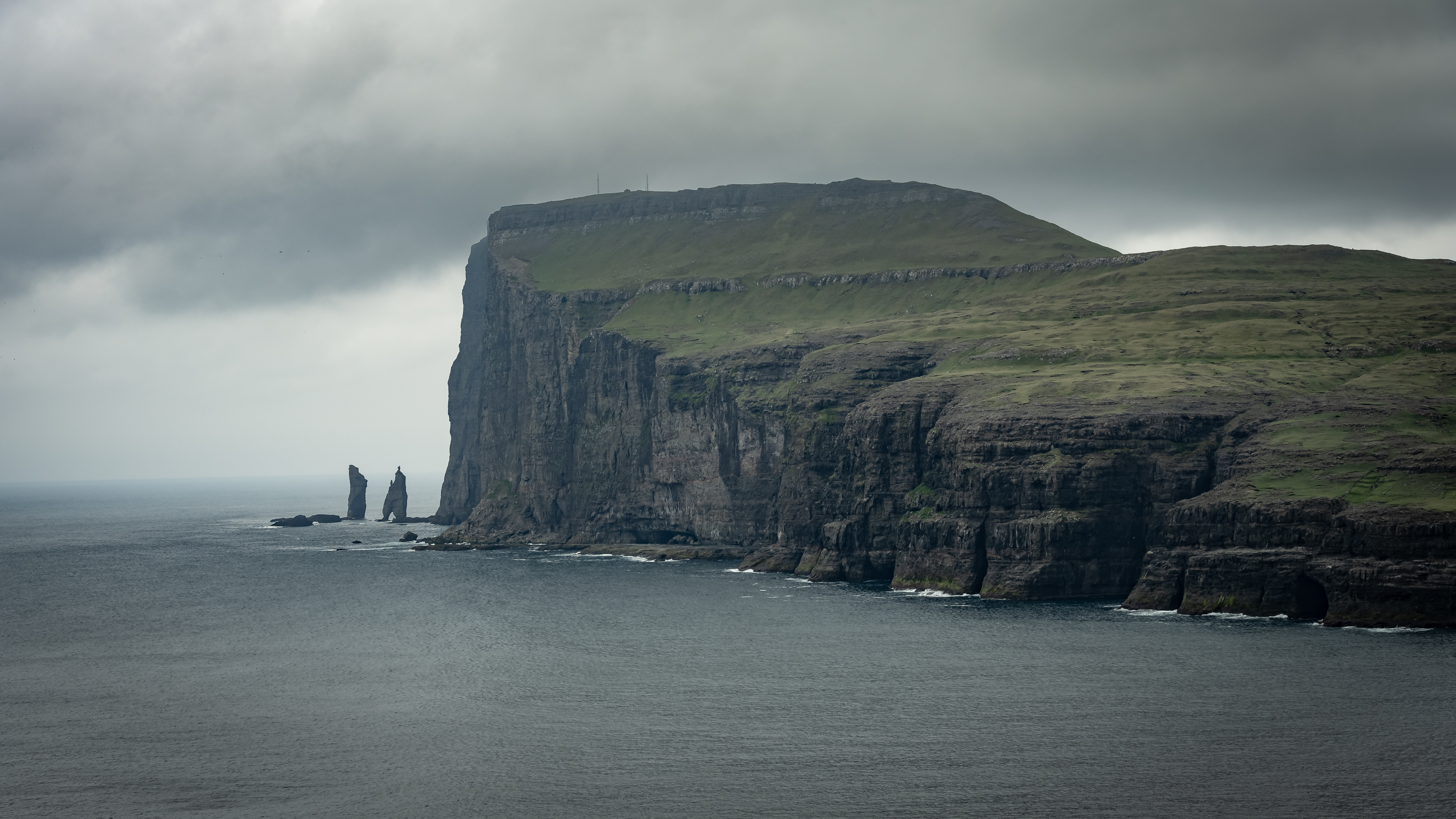
View from Tjörnuvik

Risin og Kellingin (Risin and Kellingin) are two sea stacks just off the northern coast of the island of Eysturoy in the Faroe Islands close to the town of Eiði. The name Risin og Kellingin means The Giant and the Witch (or Hag) and relates to an old legend about their origins. The Giant (Risin) is the 71m stack further from the coast, and the witch (Kellingin) is the 68m pointed stack nearer land, standing with her legs apart.

== Legend of the Giant and the Witch ==
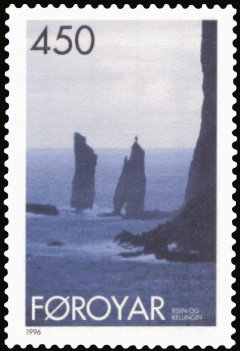
1996 stamp issued by the Postverk Føroya.

A legend tells how, once upon a time, the giants in Iceland were envious and decided that they wanted the Faroes. So the giant and the witch (his wife in some versions of the story) were sent down to the Faroe Islands to bring them back.

They reached the north-westernmost mountain Eiðiskollur (see map), and the giant stayed in the sea while the witch climbed up the mountain with a heavy rope to tie the islands together so that she could push them onto the giant's back. However, when she attached the rope to the mountain and pulled, the northern part of the mountain split. Further attempts were also unsuccessful, and they struggled through the night, but the base of the mountain was firm and they could not move it.

If the sun shines on a giant or witch, it turns to stone. So it was that as they continued to struggle they didn't notice time passing, and as dawn broke a shaft of sunlight put a stop to their efforts by turning them to stone on the spot. They have stood there ever since, staring longingly across the ocean towards Iceland.

A number of versions of this legend are recounted in sources about the Faroe Islands, all derived from the Færøsk Anthologi.

== Viewing Risin og Kellingin ==
The stacks can be viewed by walking north from Eiði then turning east towards the coast and following the low cliffs for a short way. Other good views can be had on a clear day from Tjørnuvík on the island of Streymoy.

== The future of Kellingin ==
Faroese geologists predict that Kellingin, which currently stands on two legs, will fall into the sea sometime in the next few decades during the winter storms. Already part of the stack broke off at the beginning of the twentieth century.
