= Æðuvík =

Village in Faroe Islands, Kingdom of Denmark

- Village
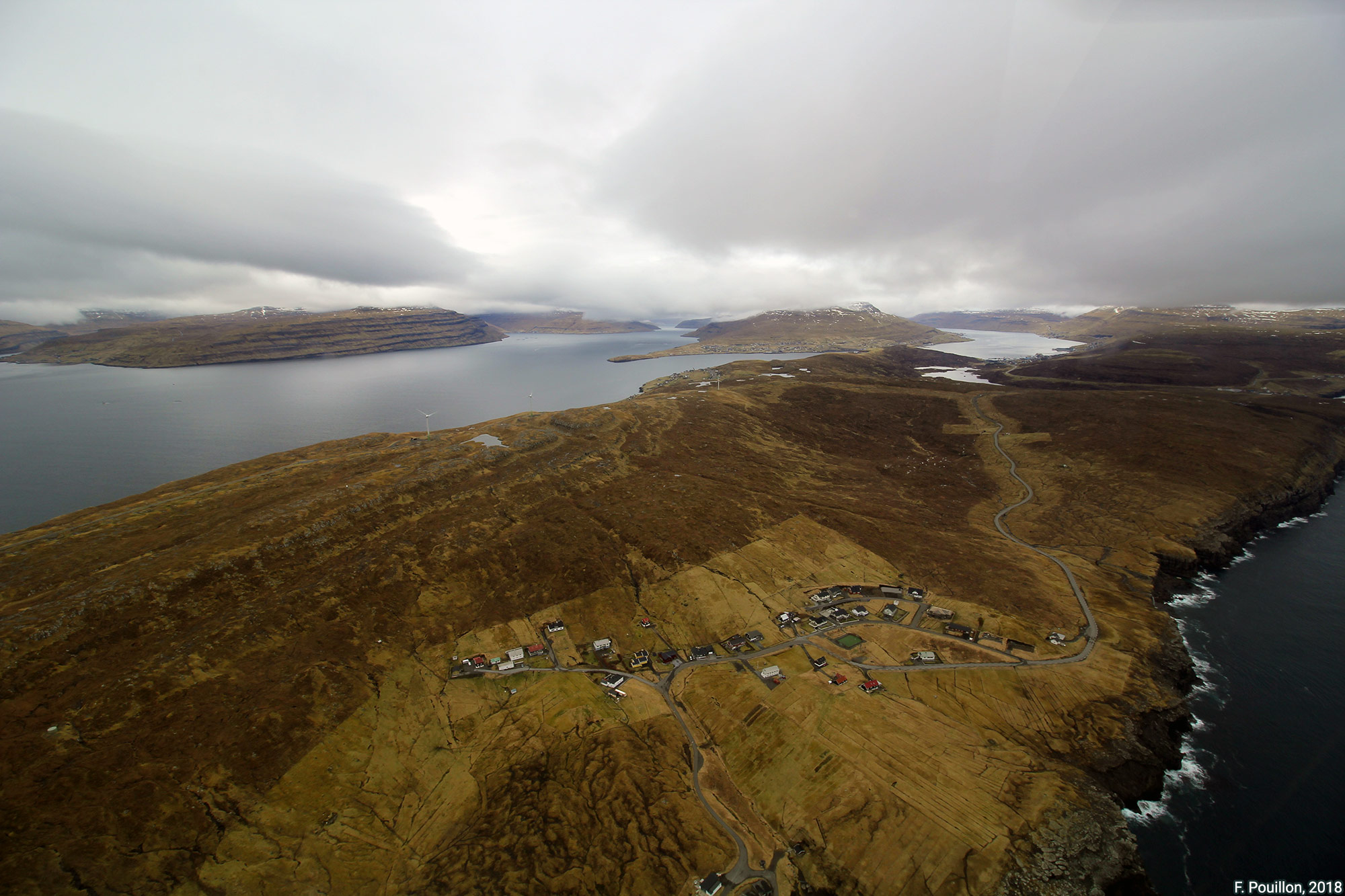

- Location in the Faroe Islands
- Coordinates: 62°4′11″N 6°41′24″W
- State: Kingdom of Denmark
- Country: Faroe Islands
- Island: Eysturoy
- Municipality: Runavík
- Founded: 1897

Population (September 2025)
  - Total: 89
- Time zone: GMT
  - Summer (DST): UTC+1 (EST)
- Postal code: FO 645
- Climate: Cfc

Æðuvík (/ˈɛaʋʊˌʋʊik/ from Æða meaning "duck" and vík meaning "bay", Danish: Avevig) is a community located on the southernmost tip of Eysturoy island of the Faroe Islands.

Founded in 1897, its postal code is FO 645. Its population is about 100, and it is located at N 62° 4' 11 W 6° 41' 24. The village is located in the Runavík municipality along with the Innan Glyvur, Runavík, Saltangará, Rituvík, Skipanes, Søldarfjørður, Elduvík, Funningsfjørður, Glyvrar, Oyndarfjørður, Skáli, Skálafjørður, Lambi, and Lambareiði villages.

== See also ==
- List of towns in the Faroe Islands
