= Saltangará =

- Village
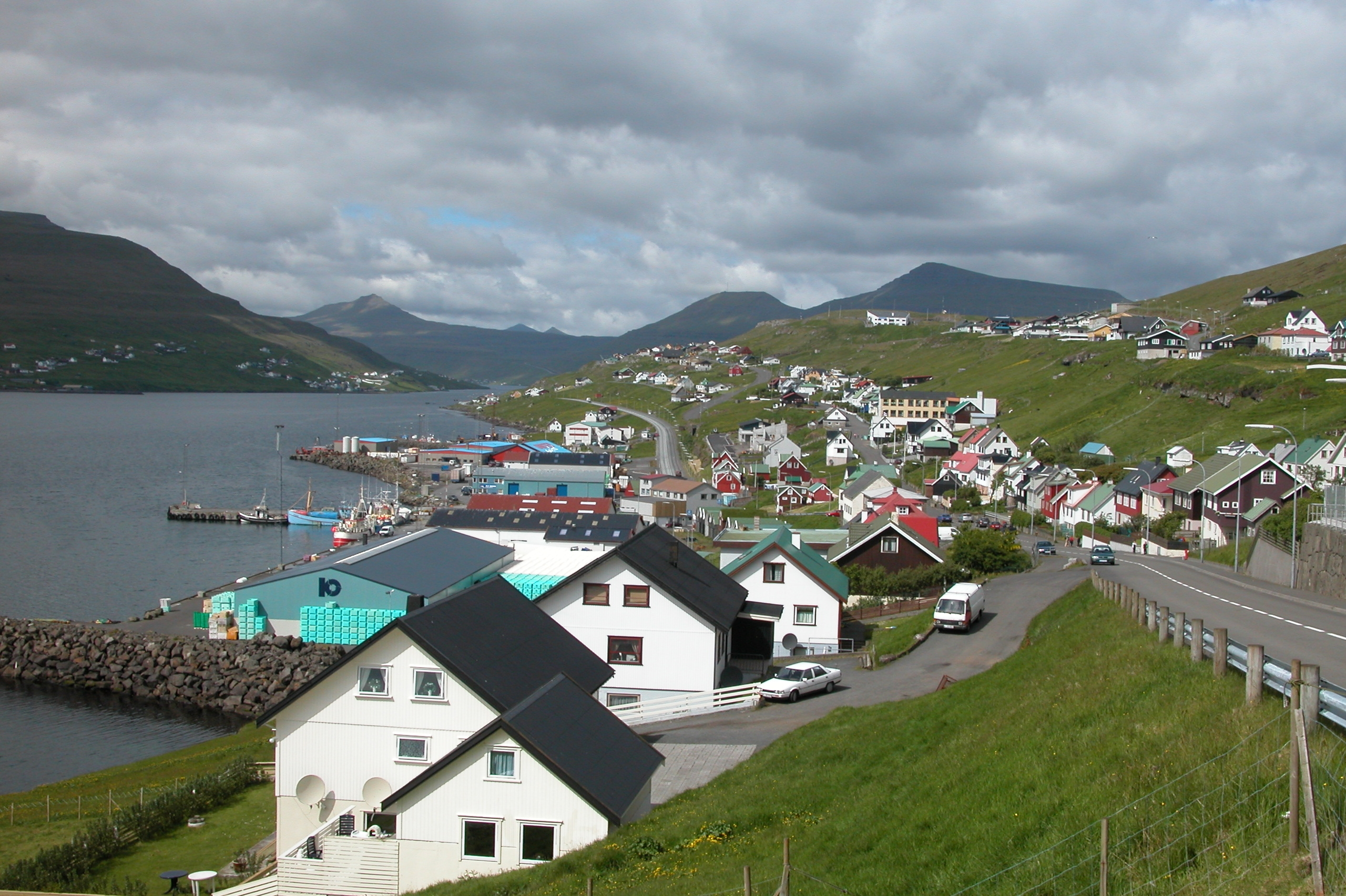

- Location in the Faroe Islands
- Coordinates: 62°7′3″N 6°43′7″W
- State: Kingdom of Denmark
- Constituent country: Faroe Islands
- Island: Eysturoy
- Municipality: Runavík Municipality
- Founded: 1846

Population (September 2025)
  - Total: 1,223
- Time zone: GMT
  - Summer (DST): UTC+1 (EST)
- Postal code: FO 600
- Climate: Cfc

Saltangará (Danish: Saltangerå) is a village in the Faroe Islands, on the island of Eysturoy.

Saltangará was founded in 1846 and is situated on the eastern side of Eysturoys Skalafjordur-inlet between Rituvík and Søldarfjørður.

The name is derived from three words: angar comes from the Old Norse angr which means a fjord or bay; á means a stream; and salt has the same meaning in Faroese, Icelandic and English.

The village is located in Runavík Municipality along with Æðuvík, Glyvur, Runavík, Rituvík, Skipanes, Søldarfjørdur, Elduvík, Funningsfjørdur, Glyvrar, Oyndarfjørdur, Skáli, Skálafjørdur, Lambi and Lambareiði.

== Notable people ==
- Jústinus Hansen, footballer
- Jens Martin Knudsen, footballer
- Petur Knudsen, footballer
- Árni Frederiksberg, footballer

== See also ==
- List of towns in the Faroe Islands
