= Skálafjørður =

Fjord in Eysturoy, Faroe Islands

Coordinates: 62.138°N 6.746°W

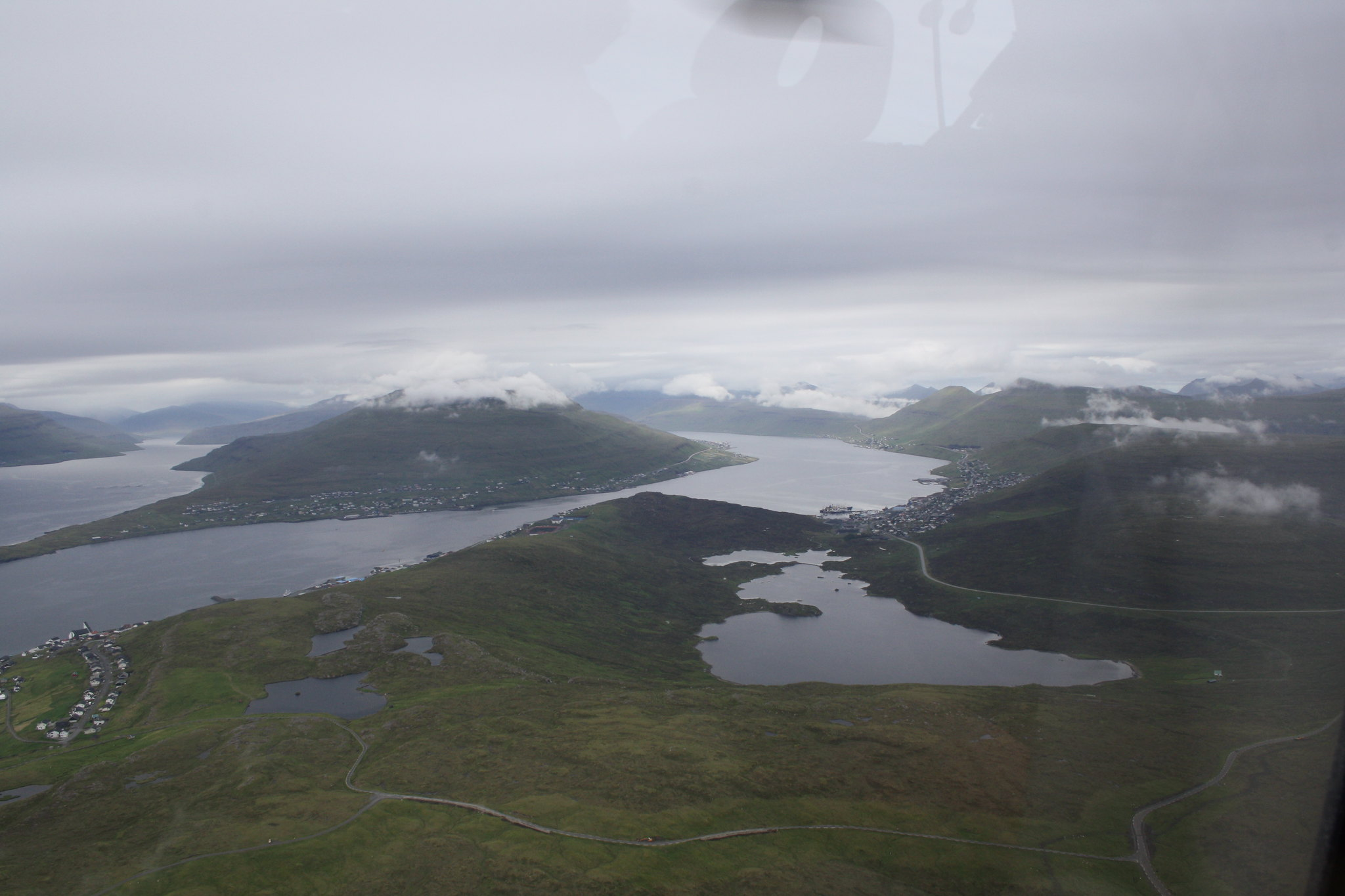
The Skálafjørður seen from Toftir looking north, with Toftavatn lake and Runavík in the foreground.

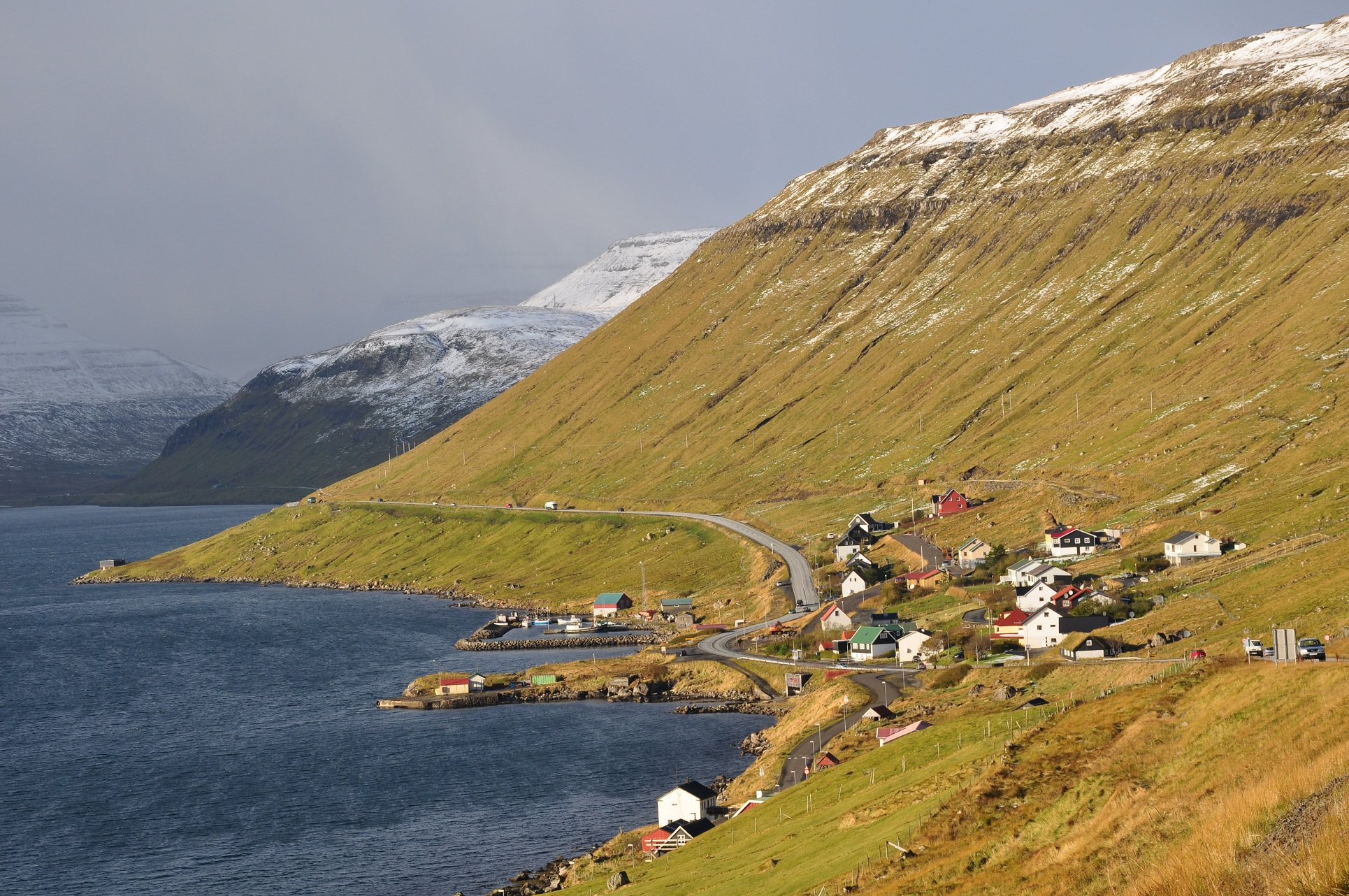
The Skálafjørður with the village of Skipanes

Skálafjørður (Danish: Skålefjord) is a fjord in Eysturoy and the longest in the Faroe Islands.

== Name ==
Skála is a town situated on the western shore of the fjord. Its name (Skáli, genitive case skála) means 'hall', 'assembly hall' or 'isolated hut' in Faroese. The southern part of the fjord near Runavík is historically also known as Kongshavn (King's Harbour) in Danish, referring to the excellent shelter in the natural harbour.

== Geography ==
The Skálafjørður is the longest fjord in the Faroe Islands. It measures 14.5 kilometres (9.0 mi) (Equidistant line) from the village of Skálafjørður to where it fuses with the Tangafjørður, between Raktangi (near Strendur) and Toftir. The deepest points are two different spots at circa −70 metres (−230 ft) depth near the villages of Runavík and Søldarfjørður respectively. The entrance of the fjord contains a shallow glacial threshold, at −25 metres (−82 ft) in between Strendur and Saltnes. Here the fjord is at its narrowest (650 metres (2,130 ft), not including breakwaters), whereas the fjord overall has a fairly steady width of 1.0–1.3 kilometres (0.62–0.81 mi). The threshold limits water circulation in and out of the fjord, compounding oxygen inflow and biological activity. Thanks to this threshold, the fjord forms an excellent roadstead and was used as a submarine shelter for the allied forces during the Second World War.

== Transport ==
There are national highways on either side of the fjord. The Eysturoyartunnilin offers a road connection between Runavík, Strendur and Tórshavn, reducing road distances between both Eysturoy towns and Tórshavn from 55 kilometres (34 mi) to 17 kilometres (11 mi). The tunnel has three entrances, with an underwater roundabout situated at a depth of −72.6 metres (−238 ft) below sea level. For local transport between Runavík and Strendur, the new tunnel results in a road distance of 5.2 kilometres (3.2 mi), compared to 26 kilometres (16 mi) over the old route via Skálabotnur. The tunnel opened in December 2020. In conjunction with new traffic pulses, Runavík is going to have a bypass highway built (Fjøruvegin, foreshore road) from the Eysturoyartunnilin to Glyvrar, on the shoreline.

Until 2003 a passenger ferry operated 2-3 times daily between Tórshavn, Toftir and Strendur.

== Villages ==
On the eastern bank are the villages, from north to south: Undir Gøtueiði, Skipanes, Søldarfjørður, Lambareiði, Glyvrar, Saltangará, Runavík, Saltnes and Toftir. The last five villages and Nes form one continuous built-up area. On the western bank are Skálafjørður (village), Skála, Innan Glyvur and Strendur. The fjord is bordered by three municipalities: Runavíkar (to which also Skála belongs), Eysturkommuna and Sjóvar kommuna. The headquarters of fish processing factory Bakkafrost are situated in Glyrvar.

The village of Skálafjørður was also known as Skálabotnur until 2019. Its beach has been the sole officially recognised local grind bay, for whale hunting, since 2017.

== See also ==
- Sundini
- Tangafjørður
- Eysturoyartunnilin
