= Runavík Municipality =

Runavík Municipality Runavíkar kommuna (Faroese)
- Flag Logo

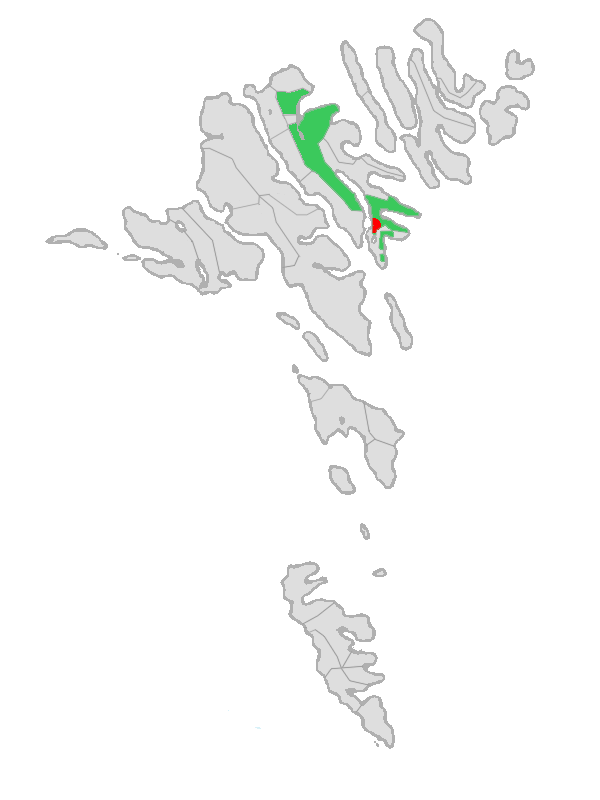
- Coordinates: 62.115556°N 6.722222°W
- State: Kingdom of Denmark
- Constituent country: Faroe Islands
- Island: Eysturoy

Government
  - Mayor: Tórbjørn Jacobsen

Area
  - Total: 99.9 km^{2} (38.6 sq mi)

Population (January 2024)
  - Total: 4,379
  - Density: 43.8/km^{2} (114/sq mi)
- Website: www.runavik.fo

Runavík Municipality (Faroese: Runavíkar kommuna) is a municipality of the Faroe Islands. The town of Saltangará is the administrative centre.

Its area comprises parts of the island of Eysturoy.

It contains the following towns and villages:

On Eysturoy:

- Runavík
- Elduvík
- Funningsfjørður
- Funningur
- Glyvrar
- Lambareiði
- Lamba
- Oyndarfjørður
- Rituvík
- Saltangará
- Skálabotnur
- Skála
- Skipanes
- Søldarfjørður
- Æðuvík
