= Victor Danielsen =

Faroese missionary (1894–1961)

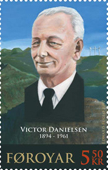
- Faroese stamps of 2007.
- Born: 28 March 1894; Søldarfjørður, Faroe Islands
- Died: 2 February 1961 (aged 66); Fuglafjørður, Faroe Islands
- Relatives: Daniel Jacob Danielsen (cousin); Jógvan á Lakjuni (grandson)

Victor Danielsen (28 March 1894 – 2 February 1961) was the first Faroese Bible translator and Plymouth Brethren missionary. Victor Danielsen played a pivotal role in the Plymouth Brethren's establishment in the Faroe Islands after it was introduced there by William Gibson Sloan in the late nineteenth century.

== Biography ==
Victor Danielsen was born in the settlement of Søldarfjørður on the island of Eysturoy. In 1911, Danielsen started training as a teacher in Tórshavn and completed his course in 1914. He was appointed teacher at the schools in Søldarfjørður, Glyvrar and Lamba. He quit his teaching positions, however, after only six months to pursue his vocation as a missionary.

Danielsen quit the established Faroese People's Church in 1916 and attached himself to the Brøðrasamkoman (Faroese Plymouth Brethren). He married in 1920 and moved with his wife to Fuglafjørður, where he worked as a full-time worker in Siloa Assembly and itinerary missionary for the Faroese Plymouth Brethren.

In 1930, the assembly of the Plymouth Brethren in Tórshavn requested Danielsen translate the Epistle to the Galatians into the Faroese language. The resulting translation so enthused the congregation that Danielsen was requested to translate the entire New Testament as well. This translation was published in March 1937, a few weeks before the publication of Jákup Dahl's translation, which had been authorised by the Faroese People's Church.

Upon the completion of the translation New Testament, Victor Danielsen pushed forward with the translation of the Old Testament, a task he completed in 1939. Danielsen's translation, however, based itself on other modern languages whereas Dahl's translation was based on the original Hebrew text. Because of the Second World War, Danielsen translation wasn't published until 1949. The translation of Dahl and Kristian Osvald Viderø wasn't published until 1961.

Victor Danielsen was known as an extraordinarily energetic and productive man. Apart from his Bible translations, he versified 27 Psalms and translated 800 Psalms and hymns, as well as writing two novels of a religious nature. Victor Danielsen died at Fuglafjørður.

== See also ==
- Faroese People's Church
