= Oyndarfjørður =

- Village
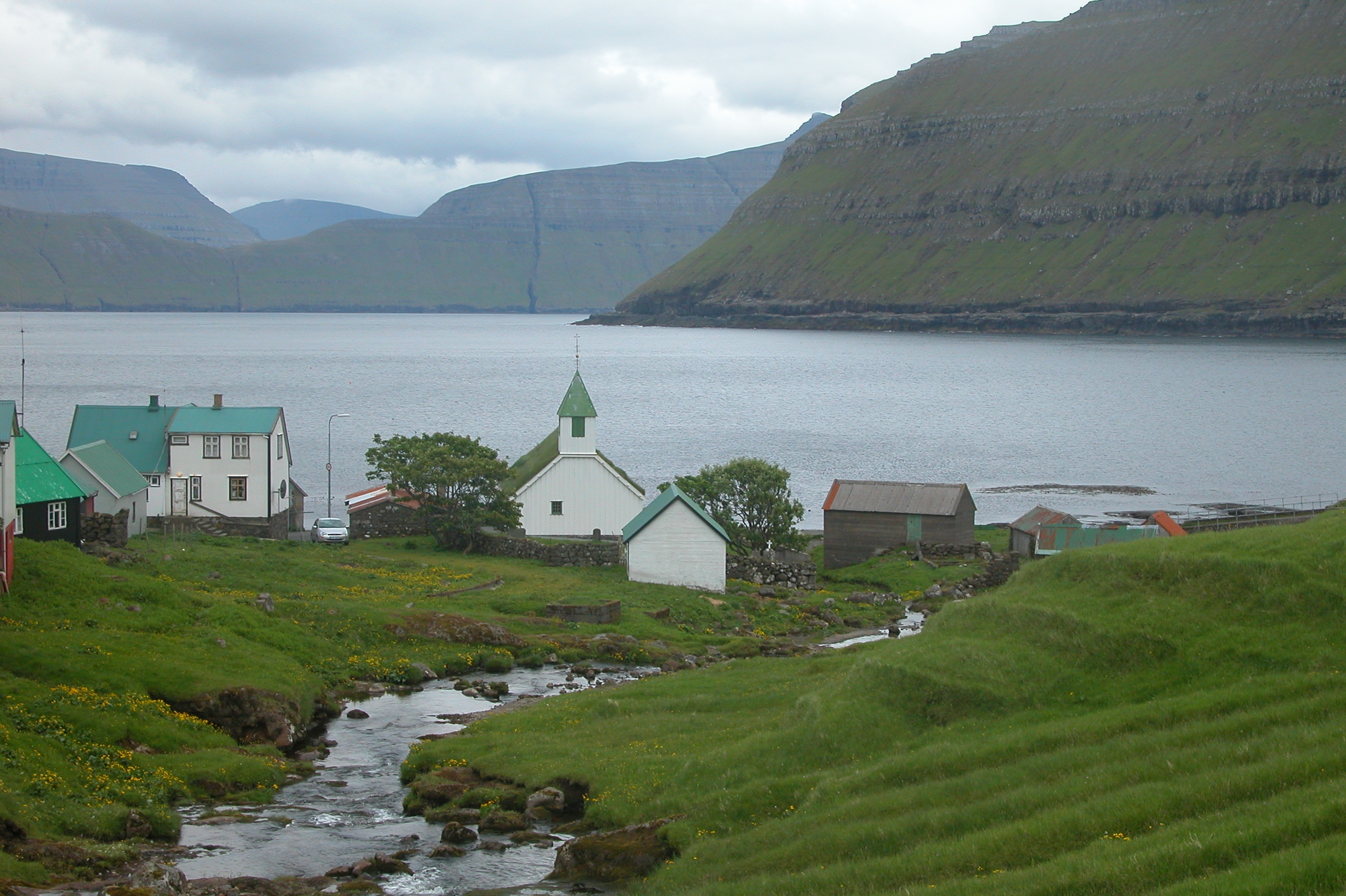
- Oyndarfjørður

- Location in the Faroe Islands
- Coordinates: 62°16′40″N 6°51′4″W
- State: Kingdom of Denmark
- Constituent country: Faroe Islands
- Island: Eysturoy
- Municipality: Runavíkar kommuna

Population (September 2025)
  - Total: 132
- Time zone: GMT
  - Summer (DST): UTC+1 (EST)
- Postal code: 690
- Climate: Cfc

Oyndarfjørður is a village on the northeastern coast of the Faroese island of Eysturoy in the Runavíkar municipality.

The 2020 population was 143. Its postal code is FO 690. The town's church dates from 1838. It is famous for two rinkusteinar, or rocking stones, located in the sea nearby.

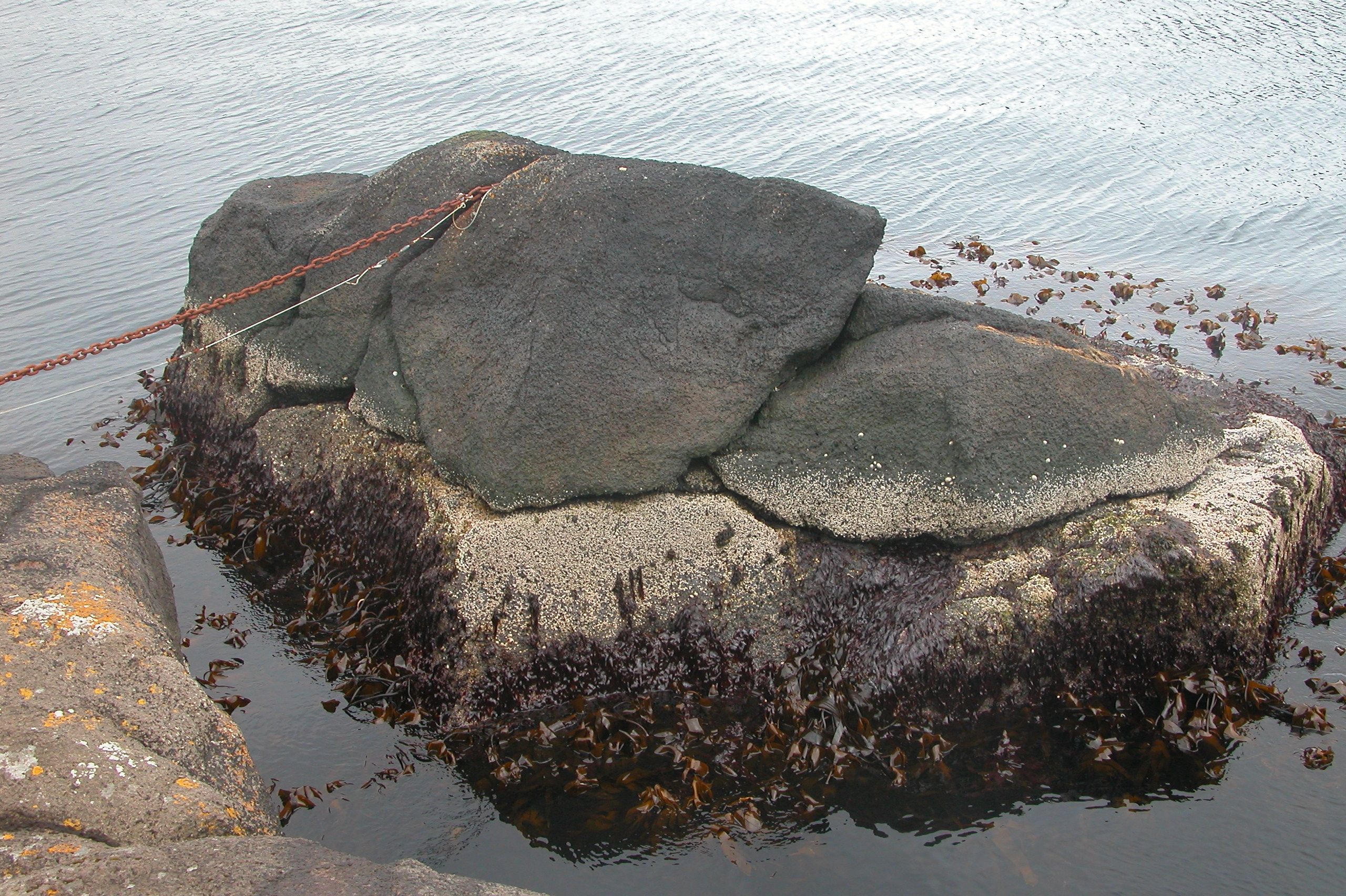
Rinkusteinar in Oyndarfjørður, Eysturoy, Faroe Islands. The chain is connected to the mainland to make it easier to see the rock's movements.

The name of the village is derived from the man's name Oyvindur (which is Eyvindur in. The village was isolated until the road from the south reached the village in 1969.

There is a hiking trail over old overland postal routes north from Fuglafjørður to Oyndarfjørður (with Youth Hostel), then west to Elduvík, then south to Funningsfjørður and back to Fuglafjørður.

== See also ==
- List of towns in the Faroe Islands
