= Lambi =

Lambi may refer to:

- Lambi or Lamba (Faroe Islands), a village
- Lambi (Vidhan Sabha constituency) in Punjab, India
