= Daniel Jacob Danielsen =

Danish-born Faroese missionary and humanitarian worker (1871–1916)

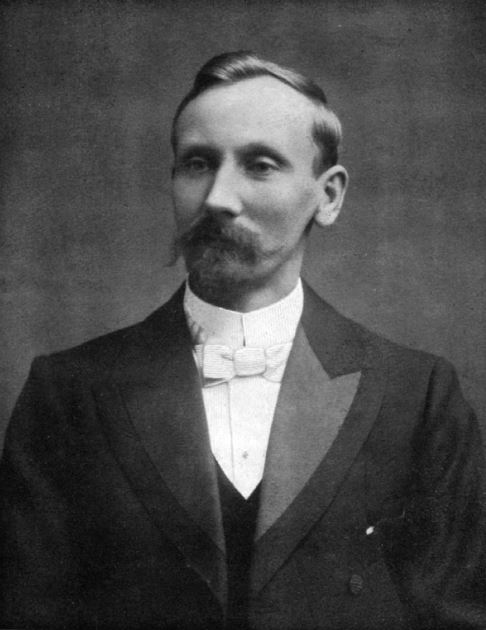
- Born: Ludvig Daniel Jacob Danielsen; 25 June 1871; Copenhagen, Denmark
- Died: 16 October 1916 (aged 45); Tórshavn, Faroe Islands
- Other name: Dollin
- Occupations: Marine engineer, missionary, humanitarian activist
- Spouse: Lina Niclasen (m. 1904)
- Relatives: Victor Danielsen (cousin)

Daniel Jacob Danielsen (born Ludvig Daniel Jacob Danielsen; 25 June 1871 – 16 October 1916), nicknamed Dollin, was a Danish-born Faroese Open Brethren missionary, marine engineer, and humanitarian. While working for the Congo-Balolo Mission between 1901 and 1903, he was noted for his work with Roger Casement during the writing of the report that exposed atrocities committed in the Congo Free State: beyond acting as his engineer and interpreter, he took many of the most prominent photographs that brought the atrocities to public attention.

== Early life ==
Danielsen was born on 25 June 1871, in Copenhagen. Born out of wedlock to Sigrid Frederikke Angelica Danielsen and Ludvig Jørgensen, he was named after his father despite never knowing him; Danielsen himself never used his first name, and it does not appear on his gravestone. His mother had moved to Copenhagen in her youth to work as a domestic servant, and moved back to the Faroe Islands with the young Danielsen shortly after his birth. Danielsen's cousin, Victor Danielsen, also became a missionary for the Open Brethren, and would go on to write the first Faroese translation of the Bible.

At age 18, Danielsen moved to Scotland to train as a marine engineer, later working on voyages to South Africa and the United States. After attending an Open Brethren open-air service in Glasgow in 1897, Danielsen experienced a religious awakening and subsequently became involved with the Seamen's Mission in Glasgow, later travelling to South Africa in hopes of obtaining missionary work.

== Missionary and humanitarian work in the Congo Free State ==
After responding to a job posting in South Africa, Danielsen worked for the Congo-Balolo Mission in the Congo Free State from 1901 to 1903, primarily in Bonginda. He mainly worked as an engineer on the missionary boat that sailed up and down the Congo River, occasionally filling in as missionary himself.

After he was accused by a colleague of using corporal punishment against the Congolese, he was recalled from the mission in 1903, although the accusation was subsequently dismissed due to lack of evidence. On his way back to the shore, he met then-British Consul in the Congo Roger Casement. Casement had been appointed to write a report on allegations of atrocities committed by the Force Publique against the native Congolese, who were being used for forced labour in the rubber industry at the time. In need of an engineer for a run-down steamer he had leased, Casement hired Danielsen on 17 July, and Danielsen accompanied him for the duration of the journey; alongside his duties as skipper and engineer, Danielsen also acted as Casement's interpreter and translator, and he also took some of the most prominent photographs documenting the atrocities.

Casement noted Danielsen's importance to the journey in a letter to his superior The Marquess of Lansdowne: "I think it was chiefly due to Mr Danielsen's skill and hard work that [the steamer] was kept running so long with me on board. As it was, we sprang a leak coming down the river on 13th September and apart from other consideration, I do not think it would have been possible to have the vessel continue running much longer." Danielsen refused any compensation for his work, and Casement instead asked his superior to authorise him to make a donation to the Congo-Balolo Mission.

Following the report's conclusion, he exhibited the photographs in meetings in England and the Faroe Islands, playing a part in galvanising the effort against Leopold II's ownership of the Congo.

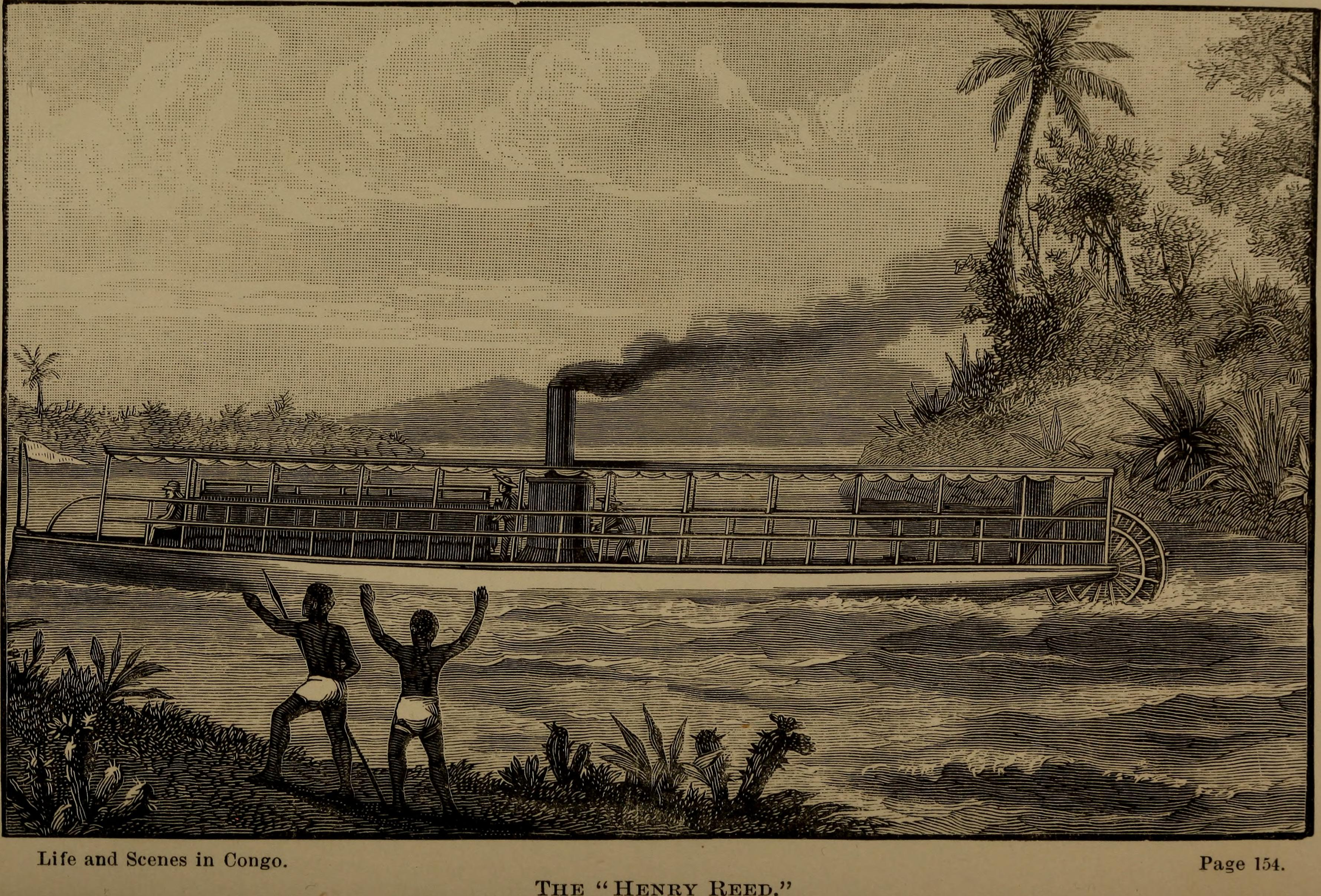
Illustration of the S.S. Henry Reed, leased by Casement from the American Baptist Missionary Union for the report. Danielsen worked as skipper and engineer during the journey.

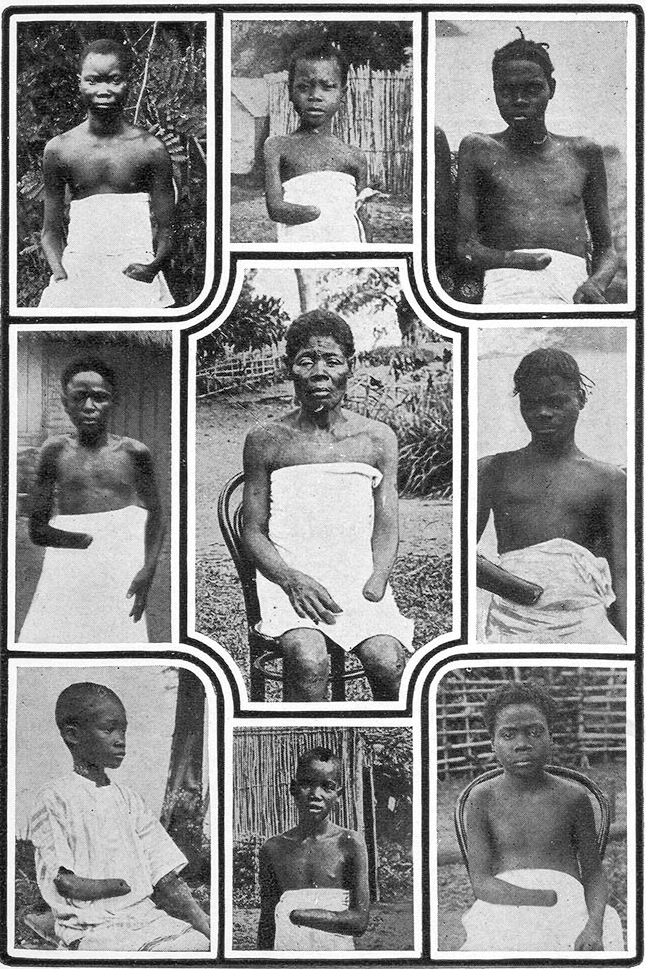
Collage of mutilated Congolese published in King Leopold's Soliloquy. Often credited to Alice Harris, biographer Óli Jacobsen argues that all of these were taken by Danielsen.

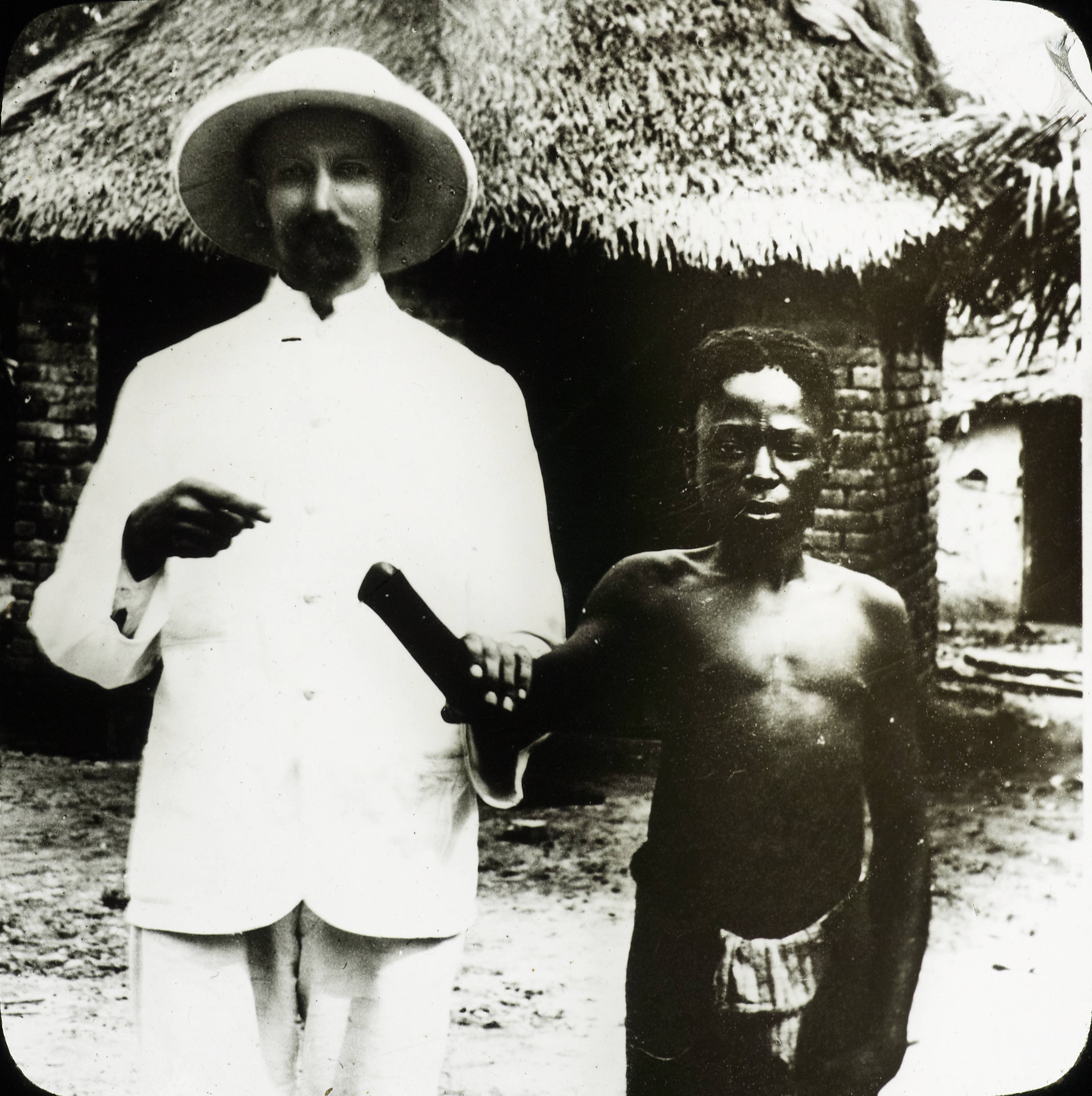
Likewise, Jacobsen argues that the man on the left, believed to be a "Mr. Wallbaum" from the same mission, is in fact Danielsen.

== Subsequent missionary work and death ==
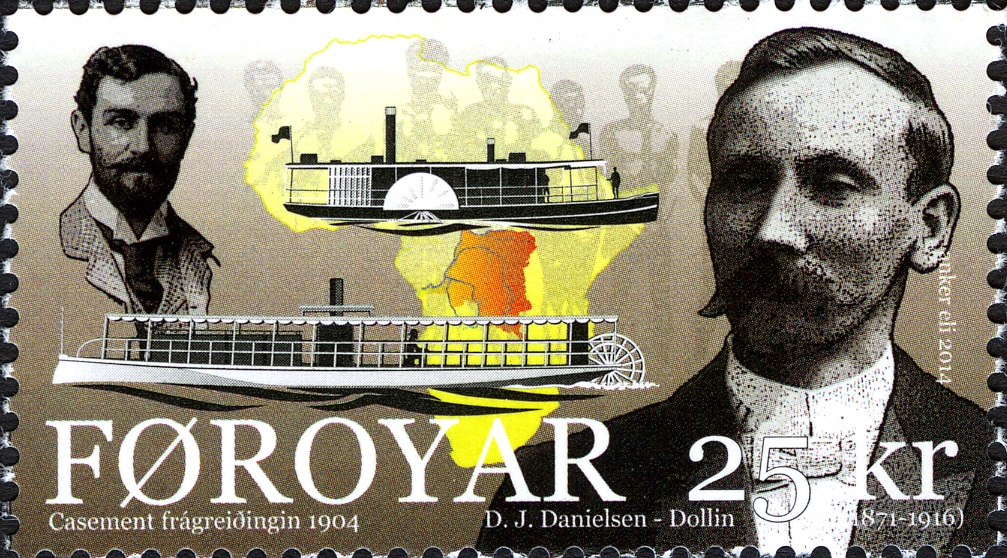
2014 Faroe Islands stamp honouring Casement and Danielsen

The year after, he married Lina Niclasen in 1904 and subsequently returned to the Faroe Islands with her. He marked himself as one of the country's most prolific evangelists for the Open Brethren, establishing a number of assemblies over the following 12 years. After an assembly was opened in Søldarfjørður in 1916, his health began to decline, and he traveled to Copenhagen for medical treatment. On 16 October 1916, two days after returning home, he died in Tórshavn, on 16 October 1916, aged 45.
