= Jens Martin Knudsen (footballer) =

Faroese footballer (born 1967)

Personal information
- Full name: Jens Martin Sofus Knudsen
- Date of birth: 11 June 1967 (age 59)
- Place of birth: Saltangará, Faroe Islands
- Height: 1.81 m (5 ft 11 1/2 in)
- Position: Goalkeeper

Team information
- Current team: NSÍ Runavík
- Number: 1

Senior career*
Years	Team	Apps	(Gls)
1985–1986	NSÍ Runavík	?	(?)
1986–1987	Frederikshavn fI	?	(?)
1988–1990	NSÍ	?	(?)
1991	NSÍ	15	(0)
1992–1997	GÍ Gøta	105	(0)
1998–1999	Leiftur	36	(0)
1999	GÍ Gøta	1	(0)
1999–2000	→ Ayr United (loan)	4	(0)
2000	B36 Tórshavn	1	(0)
2000	Leiftur	16	(0)
2001–2007	NSÍ	150	(0)

International career^{‡}
1988–2006	Faroe Islands	65	(0)
- * Club domestic league appearances and goals as of 4 November 2007 ‡ National team caps and goals as of 11 October 2007

Jens Martin Knudsen (born 11 June 1967) is a Faroese former goalkeeper and businessman. He was perhaps best known for wearing a hat in his matches as a result of an injury he suffered at age 14. He later become known as "the bobble hat goalkeeper".

== Club career ==
Knudsen started his career as an amateur footballer for local team NSÍ Runavík. In 1992, he moved to GÍ Gøta to win a Faroese championship medal four times in a row between 1993 and 1996. After two seasons in Iceland with Leiftur he returned to the Faroe Islands and spent a short time on loan at Scottish team Ayr United before moving back to Leiftur for one more season. In 2001, he finally returned to his NSÍ again to become player/manager. He retired from playing football at the age of 40.

== International career ==
He is famous for his 65 appearances for the Faroe Islands national football team, and his penchant for wearing a white, wooly bobble hat. Knudsen made his debut in an August 1988 friendly match against Iceland, the country's first FIFA-recognized match.

The Faroe Islands pulled off one of the most famous upsets in football history in their first official competitive match, by beating then World Cup 1990 competitors Austria 1–0 in a UEFA 92 qualifier. Knudsen was one of the heroes on that night, pulling off a massive string of saves and becoming a cult hero in the process. At the time he was a part-time forklift truck driver from the Runavik fish factory. Also, due to the aforementioned hat, in international football journalism he earned the nickname "The Keeper with the Bobble Hat."

On the BBC TV series Fantasy Football League in 1996, he appeared with presenters Frank Skinner and David Baddiel on the shows famous segment Phoenix From The Flames to re-create the famous moment. David and Frank played the part of the Austrian strikers and Jens played the part of himself, saving their shots exactly the same as in the actual match with the real footage played after. A running gag seen in the sketch, was two people dressed as Egyptian pharaohs, getting confused thinking the islands are near there hence the name, only to be told by Frank Skinner "You've got it all wrong, the Faroe Islands are near Iceland", only to receive a reply in a stereotypical Egyptian accent of "Oh you mean the freezer place on the high street!". Jens is later seen standing outside an outlet of the store holding up a piece of card reading "FAROE ISLANDS".

He played his final international match on 14 May 2006 against Poland. He is the third most capped player for the Faroe Islands, with 65 caps to his name.

== Personal life ==
Knudsen is married and has four children, including Petur Knudsen, who is also a Faroe Islands international footballer. Knudsen became national gymnastics champion and represented the Faroe Islands men's national handball team as an outfield player. He played for several seasons for the Faroese top flight handball club "Tjaldur".

Knudsen is a notable Faroese businessman and a co-owner of major Faroese saltfish exporter Vaðhorn.
