= Jústinus Hansen =

Faroese footballer (born 1985)

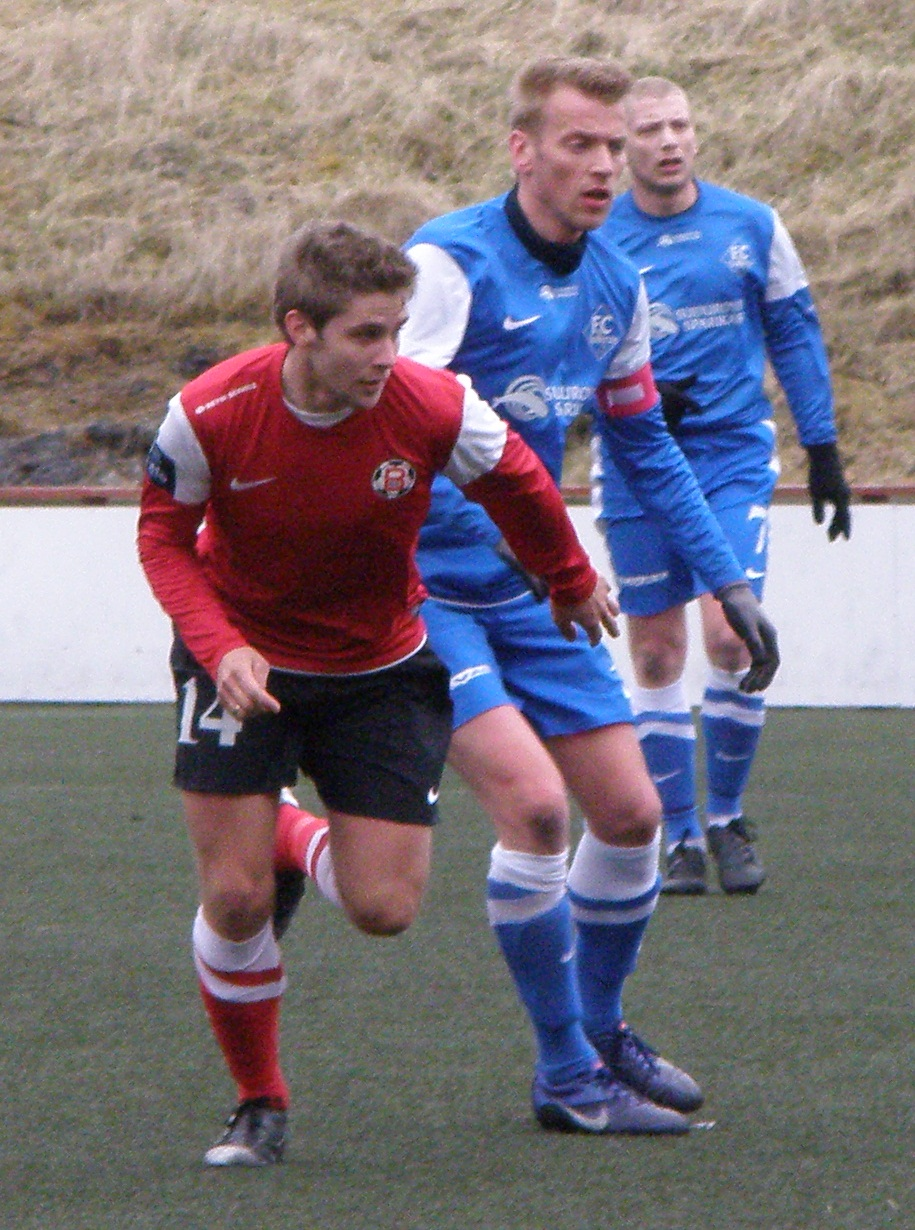

Personal information
- Full name: Jústinus Ragnhardson Hansen
- Date of birth: 14 May 1985 (age 41)
- Place of birth: Saltangará, Faroe Islands
- Position: Midfielder

Senior career*
| Years | Team | Apps | (Gls) |
| 2002–2011 | NSÍ Runavík | 154 | (7) |
| 2012 | B68 Toftir | 16 | (2) |
| 2013 | Spjelkavik IL | | |
| 2014 | NSÍ Runavík | | |

International career^{‡}
| 2010 | Faroe Islands | 4 | (0) |
- * Club domestic league appearances and goals as of 13 October 2012 ‡ National team caps and goals as of 20 February 2011

Jústinus Hansen (born 14 May 1985) is a Faroese international footballer who has played for Spjelkavik IL in Norwegian 3rd division, as a midfielder. He played for NSÍ Runavík from 2002 to 2011 and B68 Toftir from 2011 to 2012.
