= Skálafjørður (village) =

Skálafjørður Skálabotnur
- Village
- Location in the Faroe Islands
- Coordinates: 62°11′52″N 6°50′59″W
- State: Kingdom of Denmark
- Constituent country: Faroe Islands
- Island: Eysturoy
- Municipality: Runavík Municipality
- Founded: 17th century

Population (September 2025)
  - Total: 133
- Time zone: GMT
  - Summer (DST): UTC+1 (EST)
- Postal code: FO 485
- Climate: Cfc

Skálafjørður (Danish: Skålefjord), also known as Skálabotnur, is a village at the end of the Skálafjørður fjord on the Faroese island of Eysturoy located in Runavík Municipality. It changed its official name from Skálabotnur into Skálafjørður in 2019.

The 2015 population was 111. Its postal code is FO 485.

On 11 March 2019 a non-binding referendum on the official name of the village was held. 65% voted in favour of Skálafjørður while 35% chose Skálabotnur. The turnout was 74/83 (89%). Because the name Skálafjørður is usually inflected in the dative case and preceded by the preposition í, i.e. í Skálafirði, confusion with the fjord with the same name may be limited.

== See also ==
- List of towns in the Faroe Islands
