= Innan Glyvur =

- Village
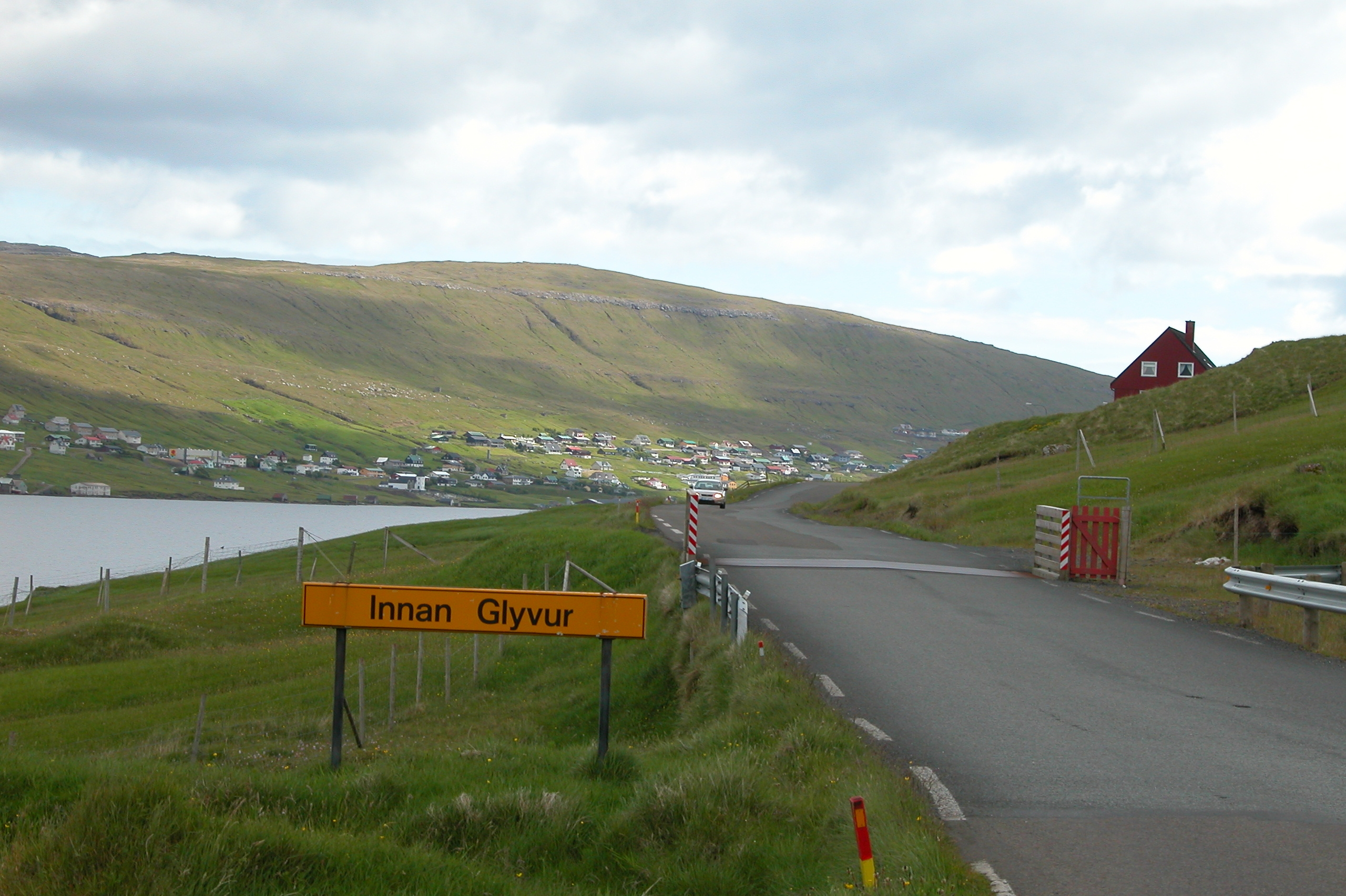
- Innan Glyvur

- Location in the Faroe Islands
- Coordinates: 62°8′21″N 6°45′24″W
- State: Kingdom of Denmark
- Constituent country: Faroe Islands
- Island: Eysturoy
- Municipality: Sjóvar Municipality
- Founded: 1884

Population (September 2025)
  - Total: 80
- Time zone: GMT
  - Summer (DST): UTC+1 (EST)
- Postal code: FO 494
- Climate: Cfc

Innan Glyvur is a village on the Faroese island of Eysturoy in the Sjóvar Municipality. It is on the west side of Skálafjørður. It was founded in 1884.

== See also ==
- List of towns in the Faroe Islands
