= Bakkafrost =

Faroese salmon farming company

P/F Bakkafrost
- Company type: Public
- Traded as: OSE: BAKKA
- Industry: Food industry
- Founded: 1968
- Founders: Martin, Hans and Roland Jacobsen
- Headquarters: Glyvrar, Faroe Islands
- Key people: Regin Jacobsen (CEO), Høgni Dahl Jakobsen (CFO), Rúni M Hansen (Chairman of the board)
- Products: Salmon
- Revenue: 5,554 million DKK (2021)
- Operating income: 821 million DKK (2021)
- Net income: 964 million DKK (2021)
- Owner: Regin Jacobsen (7.81%) Oddvør Jacobsen (7.77%) and around 3050 others from 22 countries
- Number of employees: 1,635 (2025)
- Website: bakkafrost.com

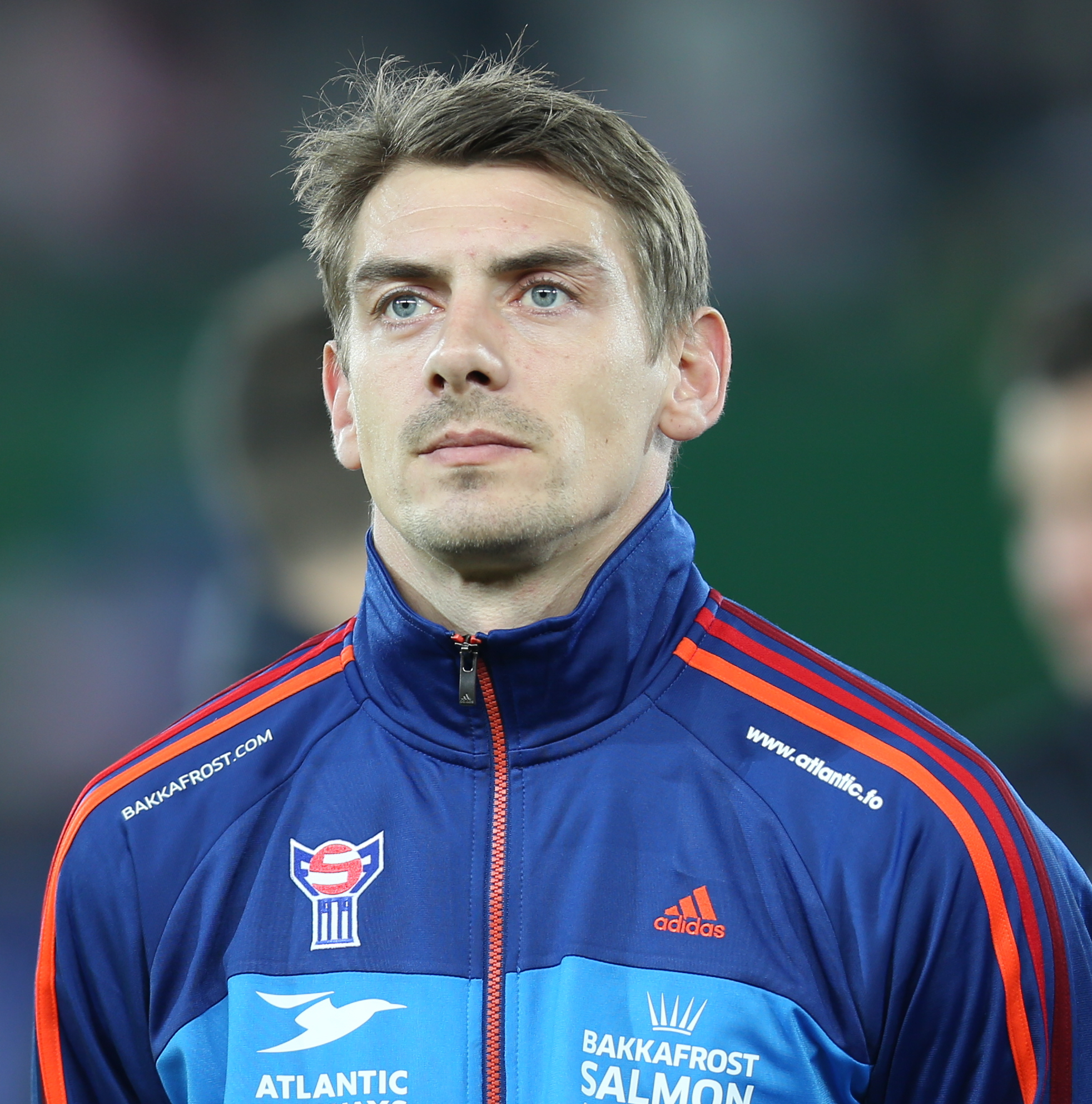
Bakkafrost is the main sponsor of the Faroe Islands national football team. On this photo is the captain of the team, Fróði Benjaminsen, with the Bakkafrost-logo.

P/F Bakkafrost is a Faroese salmon farming company based in Glyvrar on the island of Eysturoy in the Faroe Islands. Bakkafrost is the largest fish farming company in the Faroe Islands, and is the biggest private employer in the islands. Bakkafrost is the third-largest fish farming company in the world.

Regin Jacobsen and his mother Oddvør Jacobsen are the main owners of Bakkafrost, Oddvør Jacobsen owns 7.77% of the shares and Regin Jacobsen owns 7.81% of the shares. There are currently more than 3000 different shareholders from 22 countries.

== History ==
Bakkafrost was established in 1968 by the three brothers Martin, Hans and Roland Jacobsen, also named "á Bakka" instead of Jacobsen, which refers to the place name Á Bakka, where they come from. The current CEO since 1989 is Regin Jacobsen, also known in the Faroe Islands as Regin á Bakka, he is the son of Hans Jacobsen (Hans á Bakka), while the current CFO Høgni Dahl Jakobsen is the son of Martin Jakobsen. The first ten years they worked with herring, but in 1979 they started to work with salmon farming.

In 2009, Bakkafrost produced 30.650 ton gutted weight. They had 14 licenses in 13 fjords in the Faroe Islands and owned 44% of all fish farming licenses in the Faroe Islands, mainly in the central and northeastern part of the islands. Bakkafrost has slaughterhouses in Kollafjørður and on the island Suðuroy in the village Vágur. In addition to this, they built a new slaughterhouse in Glyvrar, where the main office also is, which functions as a slaughterhouse, processing plant, and smoke house. At the time it was built in 2014, it was the largest building in the Faroe Islands. This record has now been taken by another building that is built and owned by Bakkafrost, the hatchery and smolt farm in Strond, Borðoy. This hatchery is also currently the world’s largest hatchery.

A few months before Bakkafrost was registered on the Oslo Stock Exchange the company merged with another Faroese company, Vestlax, which was also a salmon farming company.

On 26 March 2010 the company was registered on Oslo Stock Exchange.

In April 2011 Bakkafrost bought the Faroese company Havsbrún for 1.1 billion Danish kroner. After this, Bakkafrost could control the whole chain of production from the salmon feed, to the further processing of the salmon. In 2010, before the Havsbrún was merged with Bakkafrost, Havsbrún's turnover was 823 million Danish kroner, and the operating profit was 238 million Danish kroner. Havsbrún at that time also owned 33,3% of Hanstholm Fiskemelsfabrik AS in Denmark, along with 78,1% of the shares in the salmon farming companies Faroe Farming and Viking Seafood.

In September 2014 Bakkafrost was worth 6.1 billion Danish kroner. At the same time, Regin Jacobsen and his mother Oddvør Jacobsen became the first billionaire-family in the Faroe Islands, when their Bakkafrost-shares of 9,2% and 9,4% were worth 1.1 billion Danish kroner.

In 2014 Bakkafrost sold 44,013 tons of salmon, and the same year the company had a profit of 899 million Danish kroner before taxes, the company paid 255 million in taxes, so after taxes the profit was kr 647 million.

In March 2015 Gøtuvík (the bay of Gøta) became the first fish farm in the Faroe Islands to carry ASC certification, which is an internationally recognized standard backed by the WWF.

On 28 May 2015 Bakkafrost shares were sold for 206 Norwegian kroner. On the same day the worth of Bakkafrost grew to kr.10 billion, a record high.

In 2018 Bakkafrost finished the building of the world’s largest hatchery and on-land fish farm. The build started in late 2016, and was finished in a little more than a year. The building is just under 400 metres long, has 10 farming halls which are made up of one hatchery hall, one first-phase hall with 12 vessels, two second phase halls with 8 vessels each, 2 third-phase halls with 6 vessels each, and four large fourth-phase halls with 4 1600 cubic-metre vessels each.

In 2019, Bakkafrost bought all of the shares in the Scottish Salmon Company, which almost doubled Bakkafrost in size. At the same time Bakkafrost finished the building process of the world´s largest hatchery and fish farm, which is located on Borðoy, Faroe Islands.

In 2021 Bakkafrost announced that they would be starting their own aircraft service to transport their finished products to the United States, and other countries, starting out by buying one Boeing 767-200. This makes Bakkafrost the first fish farming company in the world to own and operate an aircraft service, and the only fish farming company in the world to own all of the value chain, from roe and feed production to processing, ship operations, and transport service.

In 2022 Bakkafrost will receive their newest addition to their ship fleet, a new wellboat which will be 109 meters long and 22 meters wide. It has a capacity of 10.000 m3. This will be the company’s 8th ship.

Bakkafrost owns 40% of a lumpsucker cleaner fish farm in Svínoy.

In early 2022, due to the Russian invasion of Ukraine, Bakkafrost stopped permanently selling salmon to Russia. On 22 June 2022, the company announced that it had acquired a Boeing 757 cargo plane to use in shipping salmon from the Faroe Islands to the United States, enabling same-day distribution. The Boeing 757-200 is operated by West Air Sweden.

== See also ==
- Economy of the Faroe Islands
- List of companies of the Faroe Islands
