= Funningsfjørður =

- Village
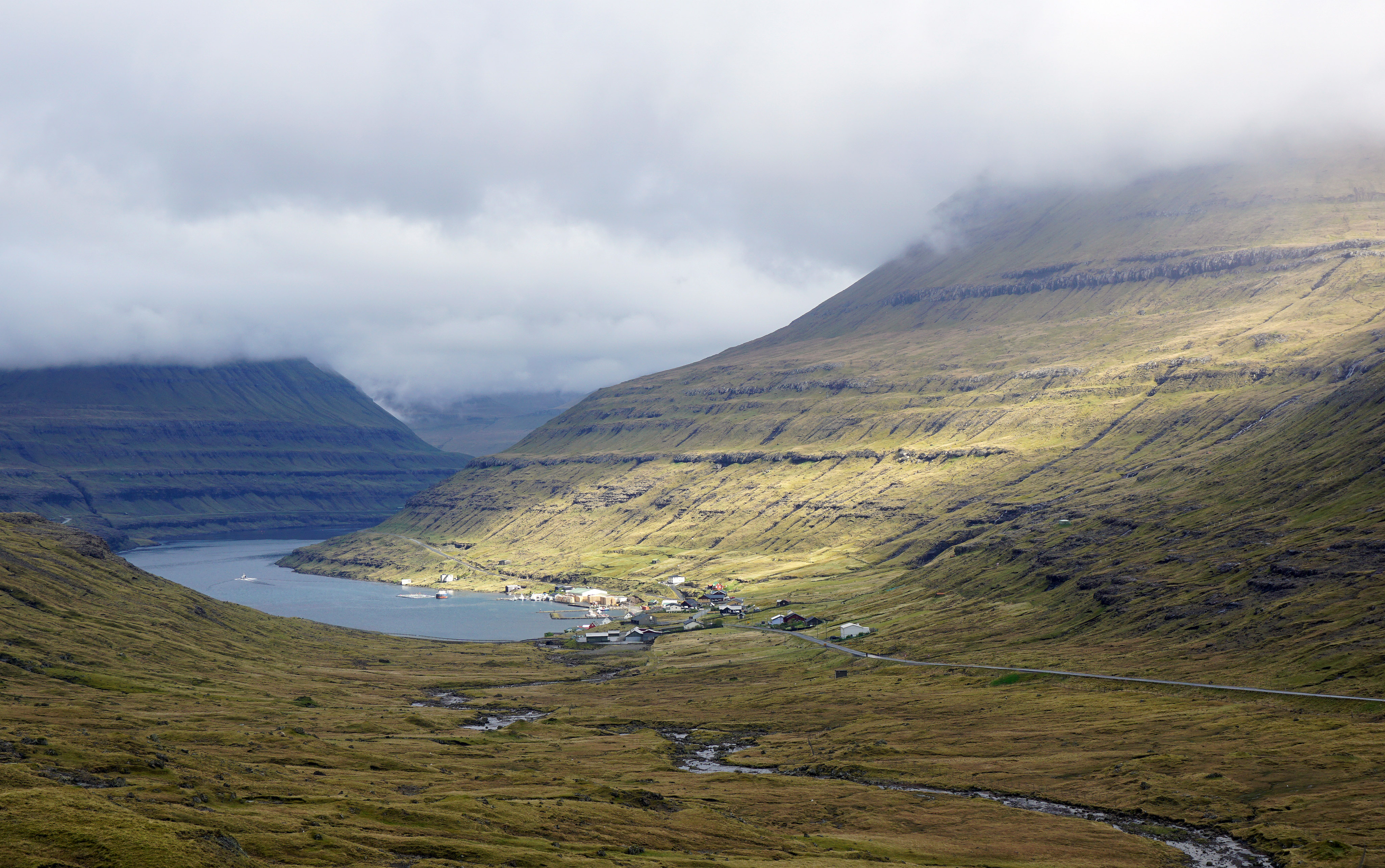
- Funningsfjørður

- Location within the Faroe Islands
- Coordinates: 62°14′17″N 6°55′44″W
- State: Kingdom of Denmark
- Constituent country: Faroe Islands
- Island: Eysturoy
- Municipality: Runavík
- Founded: 1812

Population (September 2025)
  - Total: 59
- ZIP code: FO 477
- Climate: Cfc

Funningsfjørður (Danish: Fundingsfjord) is a village in Faroe Islands, located at the end of a fjord of the same name ('fjørður' is the Faroese word for 'fjord'). It was founded in 1812 and has since 2005 been part of the municipality of Runavík.

== Whaling station ==
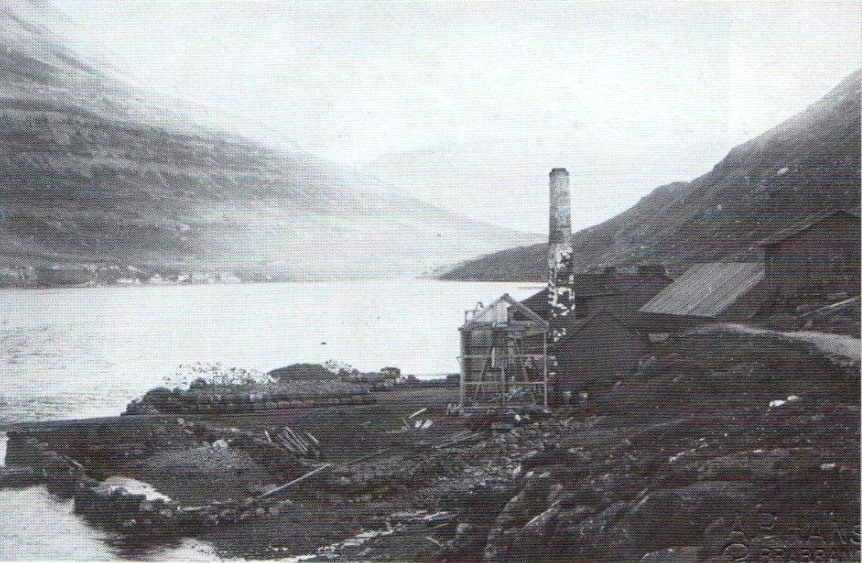
The whaling station. In the background is the village itself. Unknown date, presumably 1920s.

In 1901, the Norwegian Conrad Evensen bought the old whaling boat Emma from a company in the Finnmark in northern Norway, and founded the whaling station in Funningsfjørður, also with the name Emma. The first year the station produced 1160 barrels of whale oil.

The company only had one boat from 1901 to 1909, though in 1905 Emma was whaling from a station in Iceland. In 1909 the company bought a new whaling boat called Funding, named after the village Funningur which had lent its name to the fjord which in turn lent its name to the village.

1909 was the best year for whaling in Faroese whaling history, with 13,850 barrels of whale oil produced in total.

In 1912 the station expanded with a bone meal factory, and this increased earnings somewhat, especially because Emma was the only company who whaled "norðanfjørðs" – north of the Skopunarfjord – in 1913 and 1915, meaning north of Suðuroy and Sandoy.

1915 was the best year for Emma, with 3000 barrels of whale oil, and 3000 200lb bags of bone meal. The onset of World War I, however meant that there was never activity at the station again.

In 1956, one of the boiler tanks from the station was taken down and used as filler for the construction of the wharf in the village, which was being built at the time.

On September 15, 2018, the last substantial remnant of the whaling station (the remains of a boiler) was disposed of, as part of an international environmental clean-up event. The Faroese branch of the project, "Rudda Føroyar" (Clean up the Faroe Islands), led the event.

== See also ==
- Elduvík
- List of towns in the Faroe Islands
