= Rituvík =

- Village
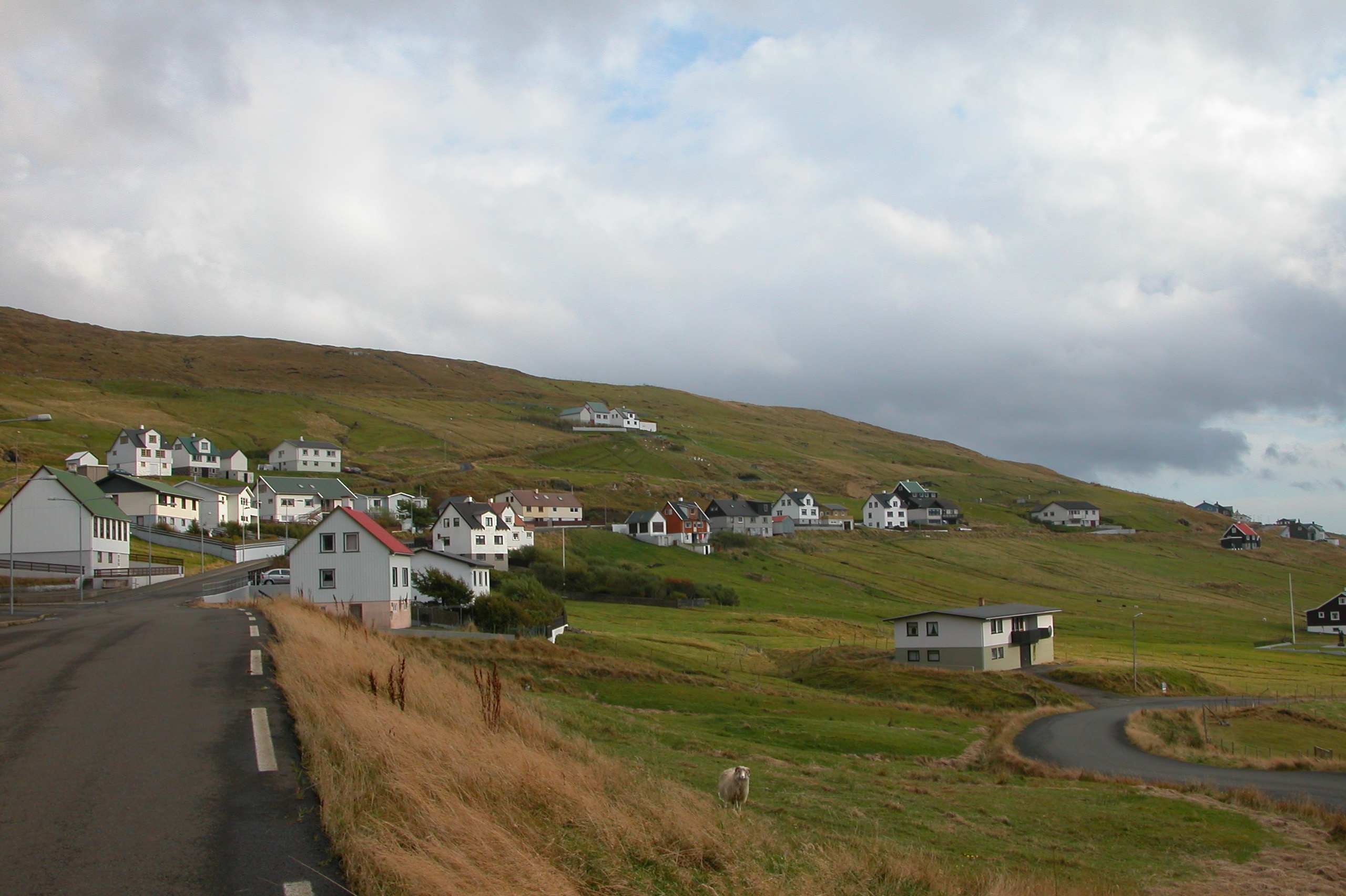
- Rituvík in Eysturoy, Faroe Islands

- Location in the Faroe Islands
- Coordinates: 62°6′25″N 6°40′58″W
- State: Kingdom of Denmark
- Constituent country: Faroe Islands
- Island: Eysturoy
- Municipality: Runavíkar kommuna
- Founded: 1873

Population (September 2025)
  - Total: 350
- Time zone: GMT
  - Summer (DST): UTC+1 (EST)
- Postal code: FO 640
- Climate: Cfc

Rituvík (Danish: Ridevig) is a village on the southeast side of the Faroese island of Eysturoy located in the municipality of Runavíkar.

== History ==
Founded in 1873, its current church was built in 1955. The name Rituvík means Kittiwake Cove. Its postal code is FO 640 and it had a Post Office for the three years 1964–1967.

== Population ==
Up until 2023 the population is 323.

== See also ==
- List of towns in the Faroe Islands
