= Glyvrar =

- Village
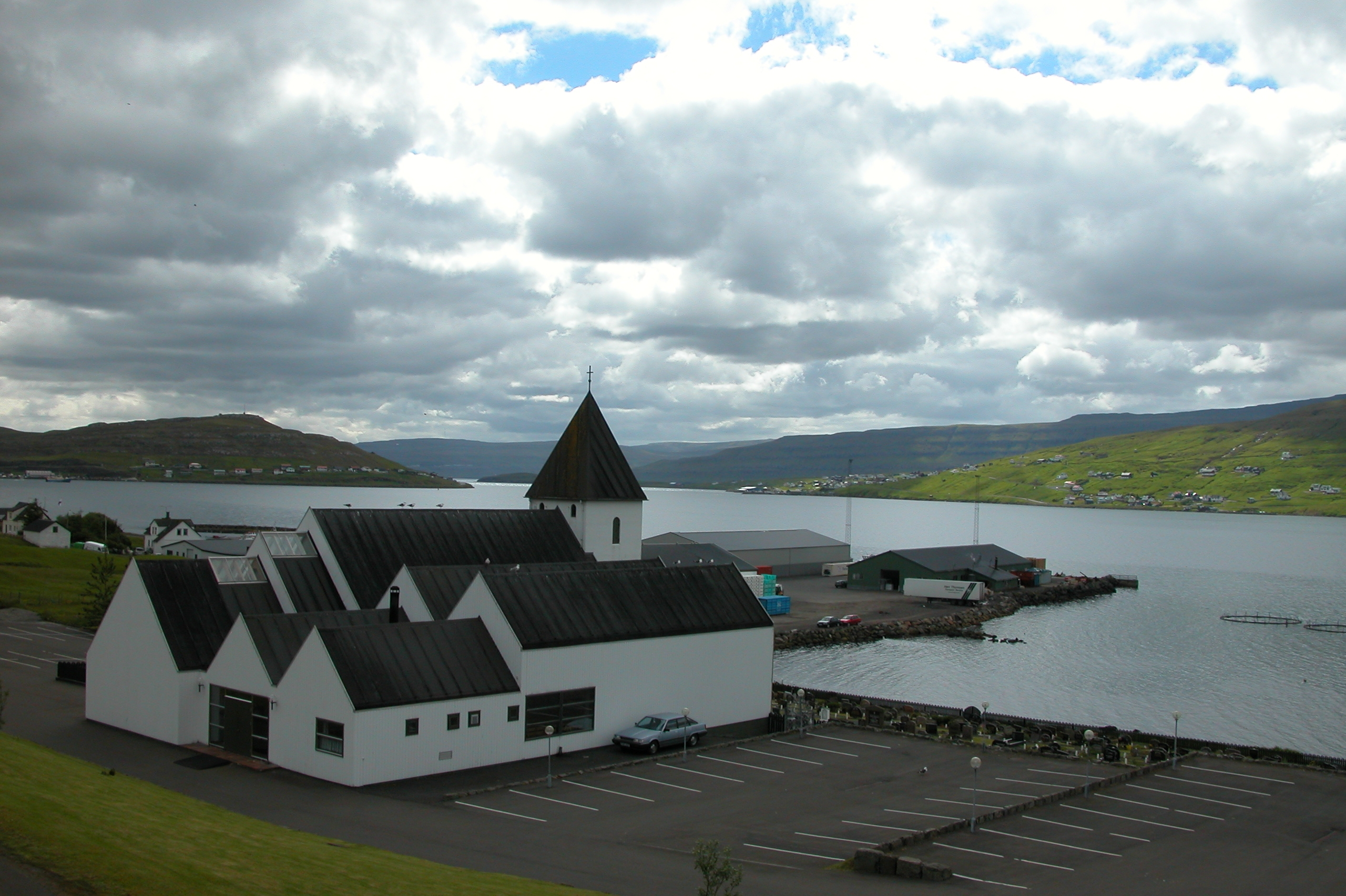
- Church of Glyvrar

- Location in the Faroe Islands
- Coordinates: 62°7′53″N 6°43′27″W
- State: Kingdom of Denmark
- Constituent country: Faroe Islands
- Island: Eysturoy
- Municipality: Runavíkar kommuna

Population (September 2025)
  - Total: 478
- Time zone: GMT
  - Summer (DST): UTC+1 (EST)
- Postal code: FO 625
- Climate: Cfc

Glyvrar (Danish: Glibre) is a village located on Eysturoy, in the Faroe Islands.

It is one of several villages on the east side of the Skálafjørður fjord that have grown into a 10-kilometre-long conurbation.

In Glyvrar there is a museum called ’Bygdasavnid Forni’. The church in Glyvrar was originally built in 1927, but it was heavily restored in 1981.

From 1903 to 1928 there was a school for navigators in Glyvrar. Graduates from here would become masters of fishing-ships.

The Bible translator Victor Danielsen worked as a teacher in Glyvrar in 1914.

The salmon-farming company Bakkafrost is based in Glyvrar. Bakkafrost is the largest fish farming company in the Faroe Islands and one of the biggest private employers in the islands, if not the biggest. Bakkafrost is the eighth largest fish-farming company in the world.

== See also ==
- List of towns in the Faroe Islands
