= Lambareiði =

- Village
- Location in the Faroe Islands
- Coordinates: 62°8′31″N 6°43′44″W
- State: Kingdom of Denmark
- Constituent country: Faroe Islands
- Island: Eysturoy
- Municipality: Runavík Municipality

Population (30 April 2025)
  - Total: 12
- Time zone: GMT
  - Summer (DST): UTC+1 (EST)
- Postal code: FO 626
- Climate: Cfc

Lambareiði (Danish: Lambaejde) is a village on the Faroese island of Eysturoy in Runavík Municipality.

== See also ==
- List of towns in the Faroe Islands
