= Skipanes =

- Village
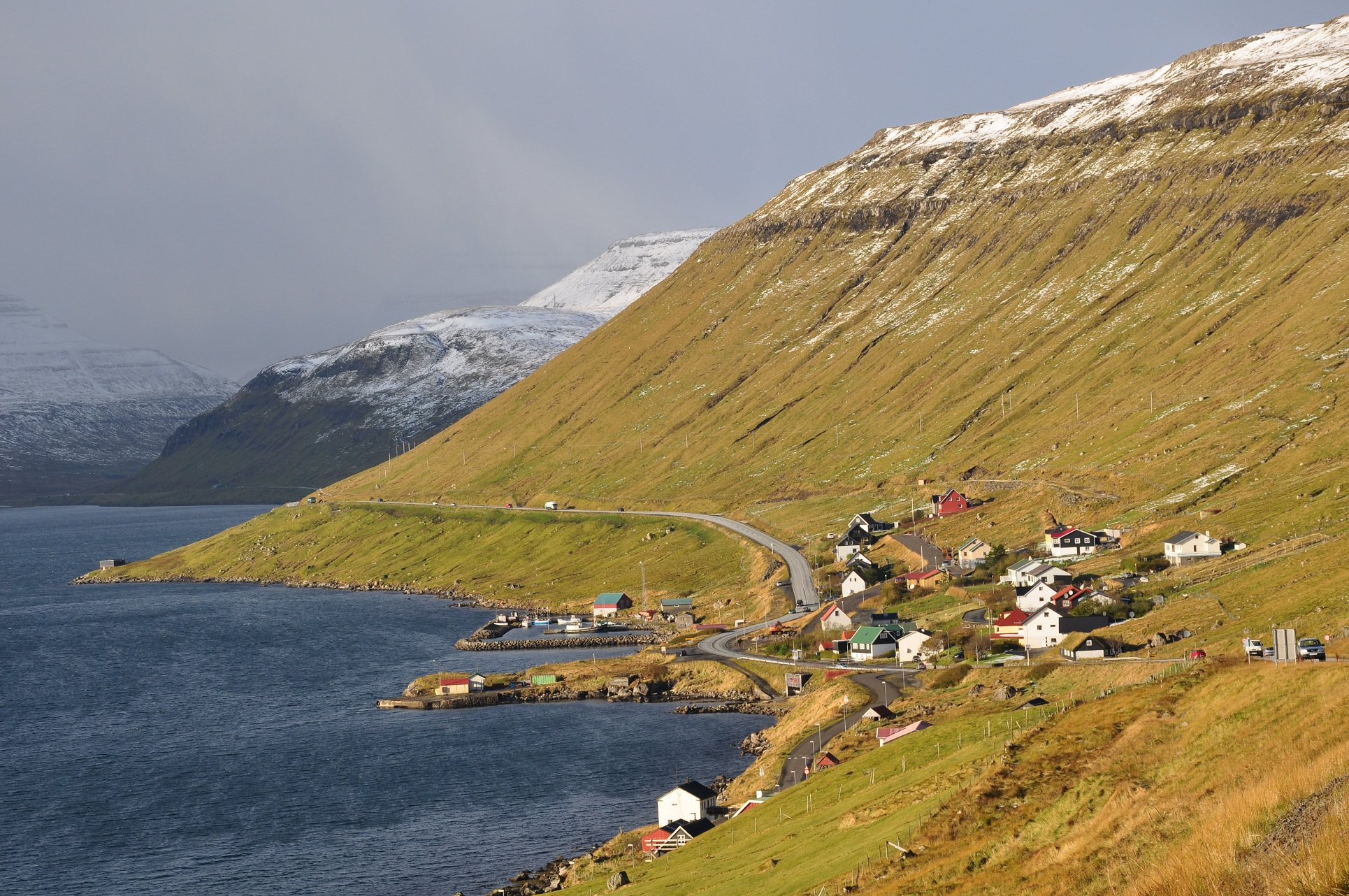
- Skipanes on Skálafjørður

- Location in the Faroe Islands
- Coordinates: 62°10′6″N 6°45′40″W
- State: Kingdom of Denmark
- Constituent country: Faroe Islands
- Island: Eysturoy
- Municipality: Runavík Municipality
- Founded: 1841

Population (September 2025)
  - Total: 55
- Time zone: GMT
  - Summer (DST): UTC+1 (EST)
- Postal code: FO-665
- Climate: Cfc

Skipanes (Danish: Skibenæs) is a hamlet on the Faeroese island of Eysturoy in Runavík Municipality. Founded in 1841, the population as of August 2022 was 55 people. In amalgamation with undir Gøtueiði in Eysturkommuna, it forms a tiny conurbation; a small creek acts as a border between the two settlements. Notable residents of Skipanes include Terji Skibenæs, the guitarist of the Faeroese Viking Metal group Týr (band).

Its postal code is FO-665.

== See also ==
- List of towns in the Faroe Islands
