= Elduvík =

- Village
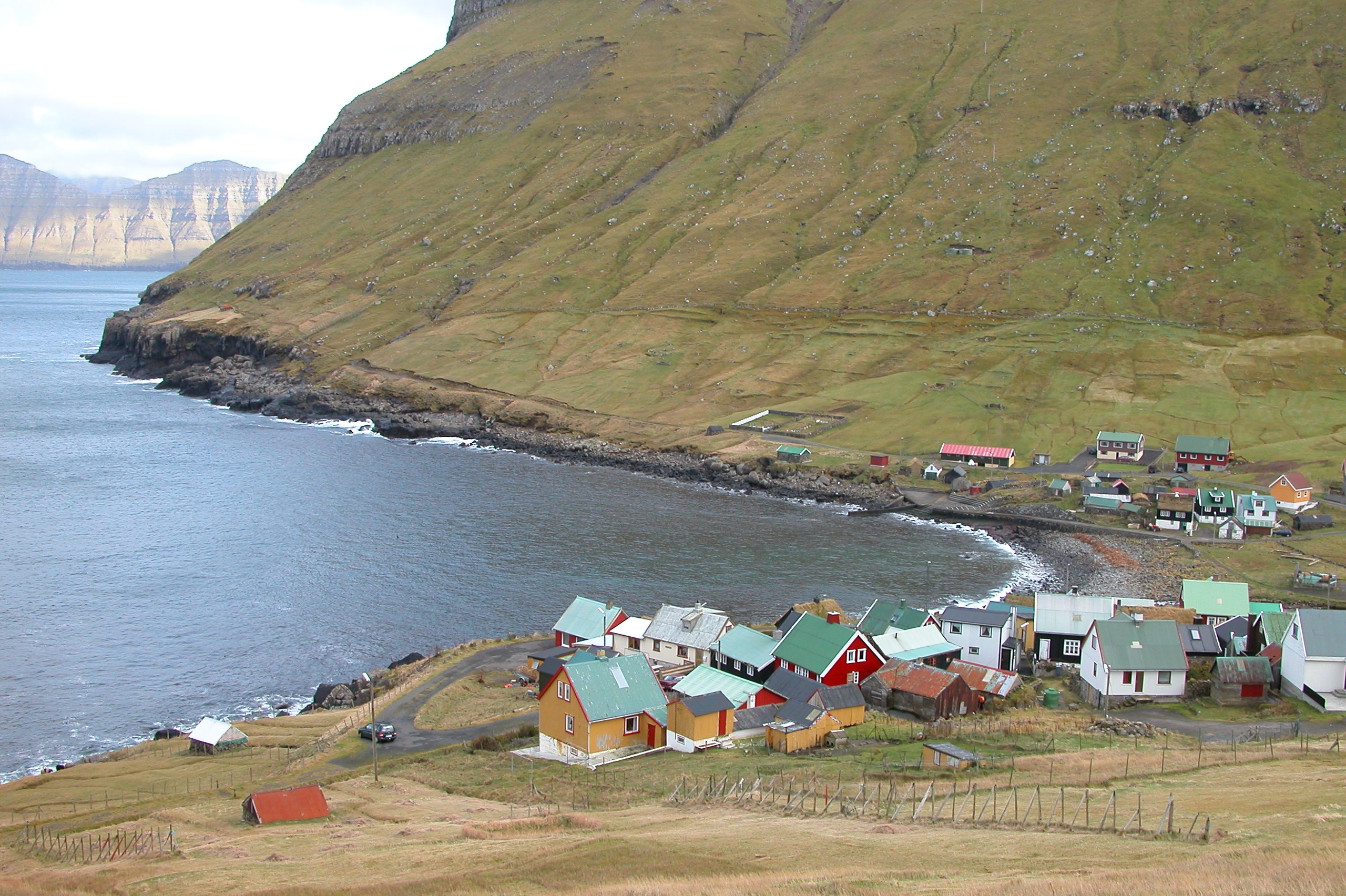
- Elduvík

- Location in the Faroe Islands
- Coordinates: 62°16′57″N 6°54′35″W
- State: Kingdom of Denmark
- Constituent country: Faroe Islands
- Island: Eysturoy
- Municipality: Runavík

Population (29 April 2025)
  - Total: 12
- Time zone: GMT
  - Summer (DST): UTC+1 (EST)
- Postal code: FO 478
- Climate: Cfc

Elduvík (Danish: Eldevig) is a small village in the Faroe Islands.

Elduvík is located in the Funningsfjørður-inlet on Eysturoy's northeast side. The village which has a population of 12 is split into two parts by a small river Stórá. Visible from Elduvík is the nearby island of Kalsoy.

The village lies by the shore at the end of a long, lush valley surrounded by stunning mountains. West of the river is the old part of the village, where the colourful small houses surround the school and the church.

On the other side of the river is the dock, where boathouses form an amphitheatre-like semi circle around the pier. From here, the old village path passes through a hillside to the town of Oyndarfjørður, where Elduvík locals attended church before the village got its own church.

The church in Elduvík was inaugurated in 1951, although the churchyard has been used since 1926 to avoid the hassle of carrying dead bodies along the old village path to Oyndarfjørður.

The gorge to the east of the village is popular with divers due to its undersea landscape, which shelters a rich population of crabs on the bottom of the sea. Elduvík is a heavy surf area, and visitors are advised to beware of big waves crashing on the shore. Elduvík offers a variety of scenic walks. Elduvik Camping is a small campsite in the village on the Funningsfjørdur with a walking area.

== The legend of Marmennil ==
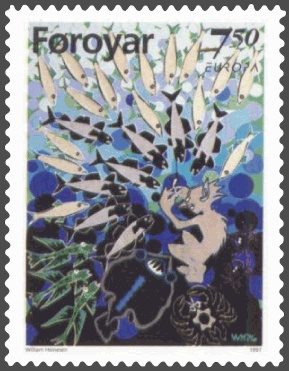
Marmennil - The Little Merman Stamp FR 310 of Postverk Føroya by William Heinesen, 20 May 1997

Anfinnur was a farmer in Elduvík and the legend concerns his encounter with a beast called Marmennil.

According to the legend, Marmennil has the appearance of a small human with long fingers, and lives at the bottom of the sea. He would tease fishermen by eating their bait, then attaching their hooks to the sea bed so that they would break their fishing lines. One day, however, Marmennil was fixing Anfinnur's hook to the bottom when the hook became fixed in his hand, and he was pulled up into Anfinnur's boat. The fishermen in the boat made the sign of the cross, and then brought Marmennil home with them.

He proved to be very useful on their fishing trips, so they always took him with them, remembering always to make the sign of the cross on him when he was taken on board. As soon as there were fish under the boat, Marmennil would start to laugh and play, and the fishermen could then make their catch.

Anfinnur kept Marmennil for a long time, but one day the sea was so rough that they forgot to make the sign of the cross. Because of this, when they were afloat, Marmennil sneaked overboard into the sea and was never seen again.

== See also ==
- List of towns in the Faroe Islands

== Gallery ==
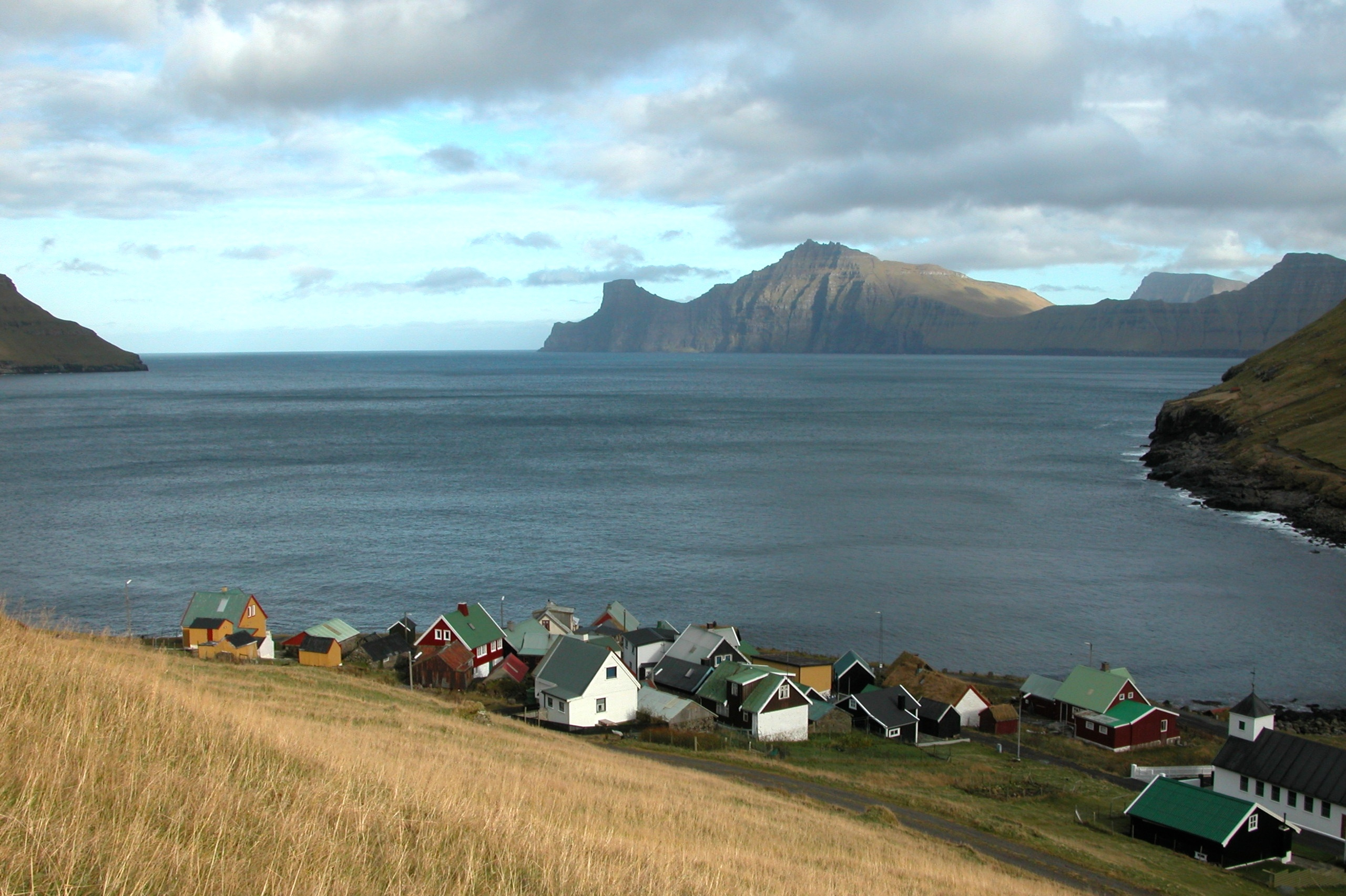
Elduvík and Kalsoy

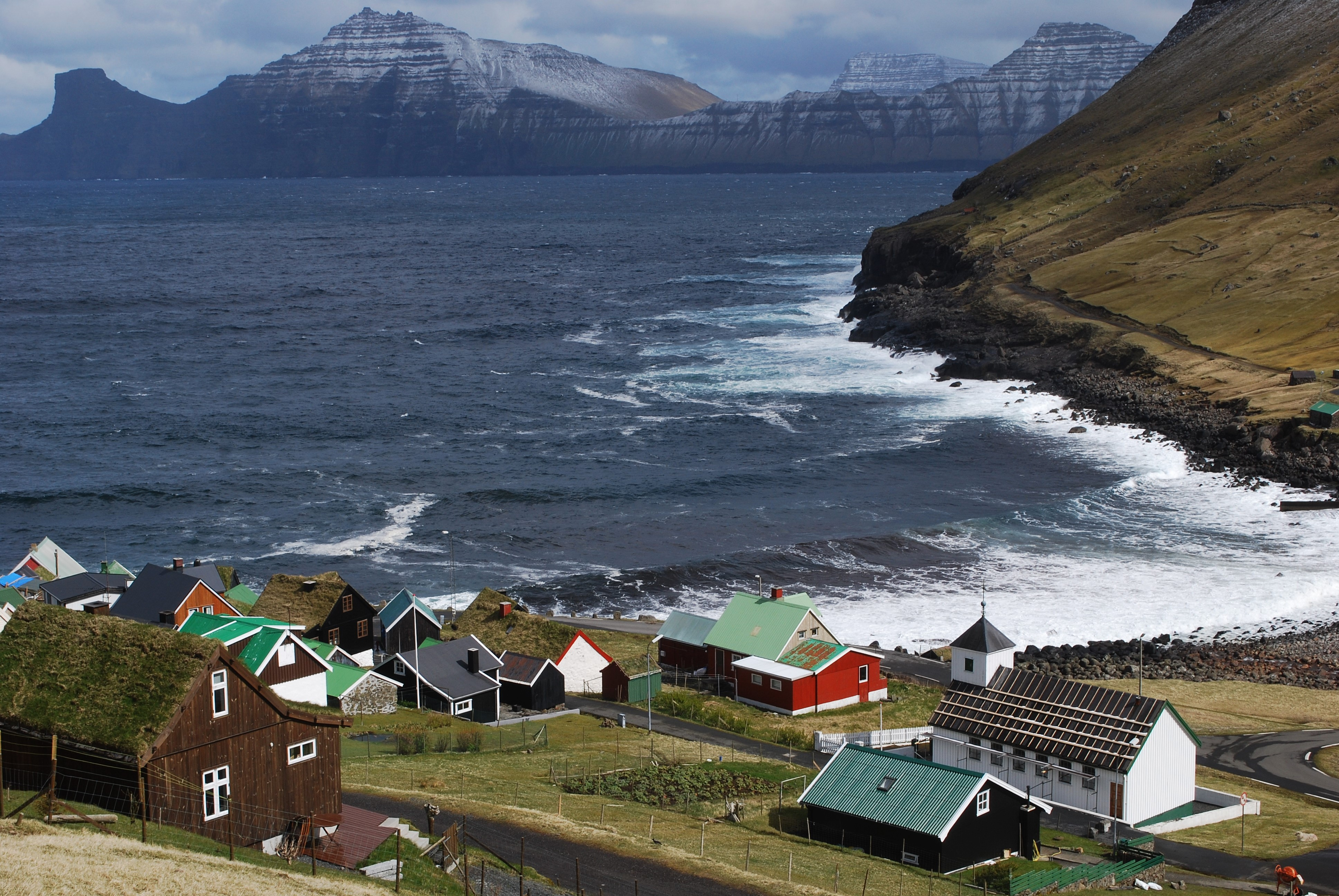
Elduvík

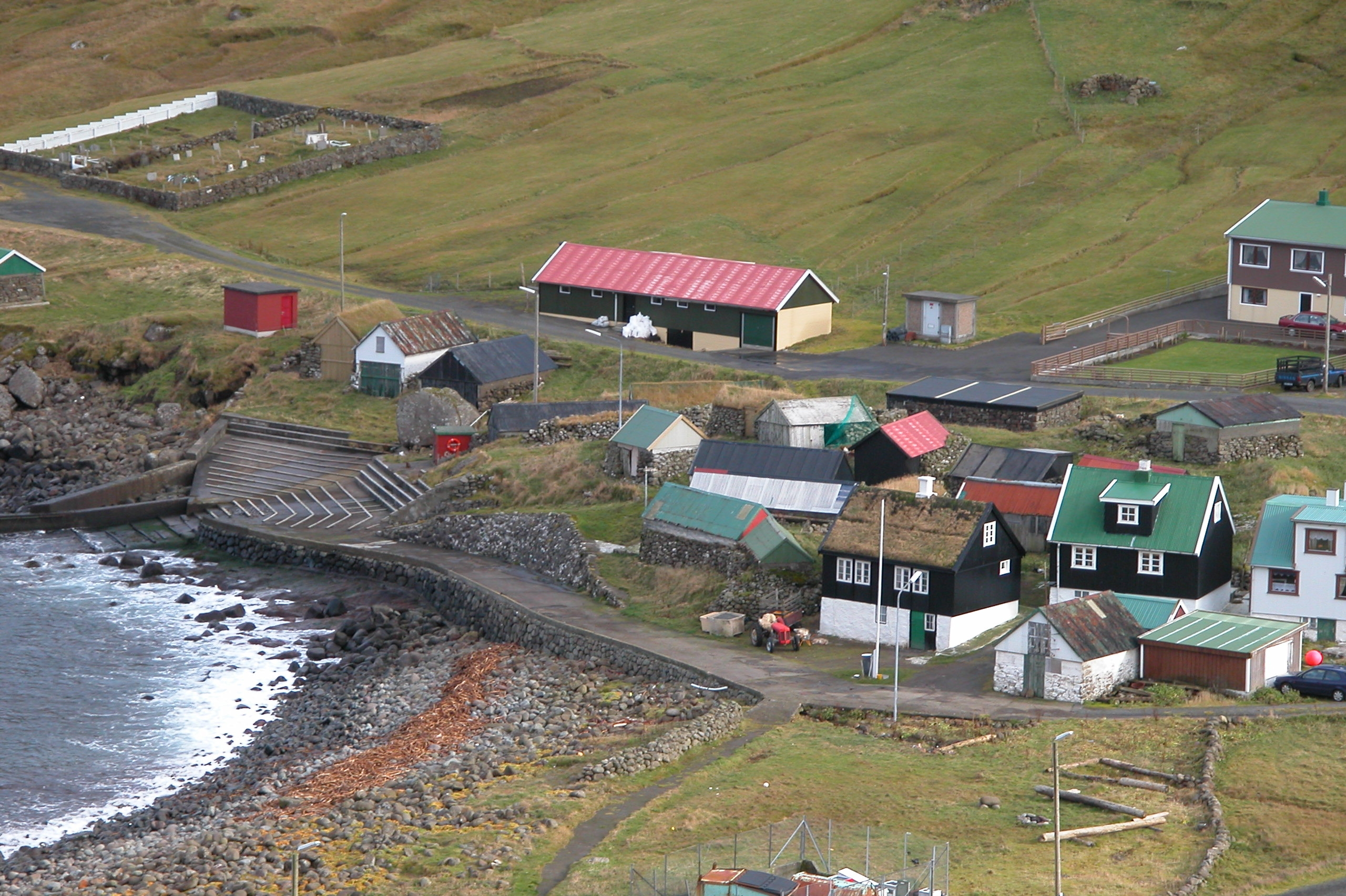
Elduvík

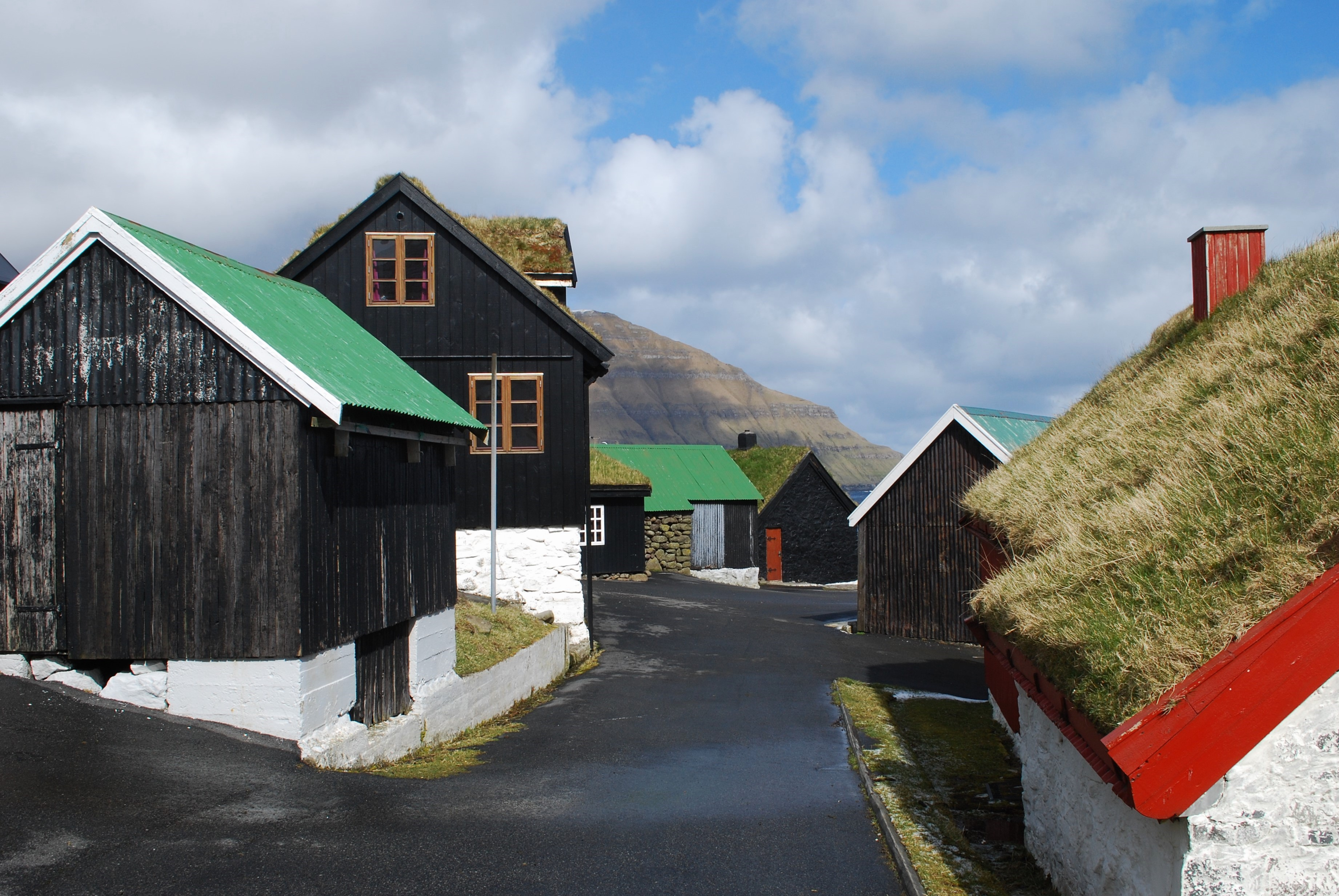
Elduvík

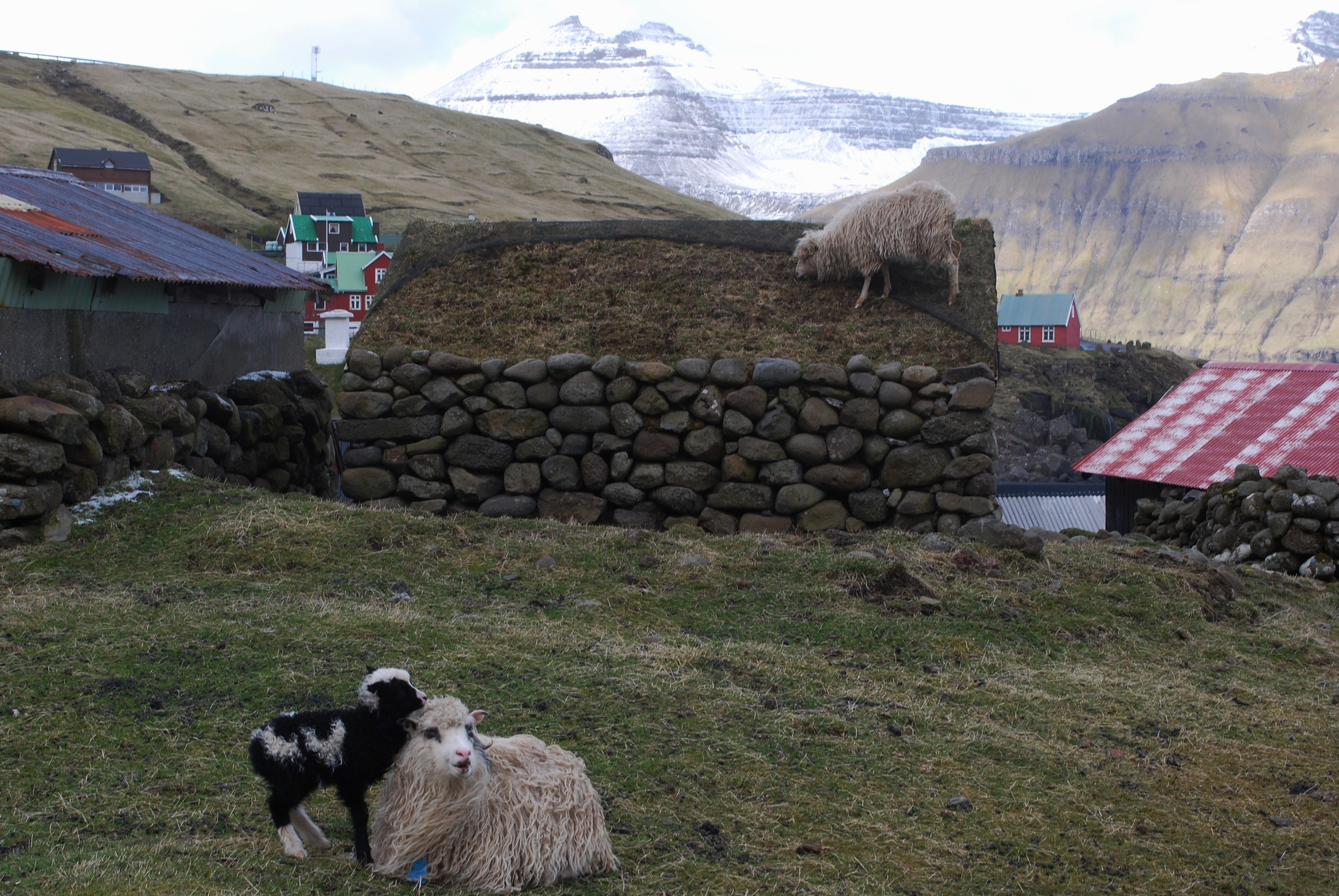
Elduvík
