= Skála =

- Village
- Location in the Faroe Islands
- Coordinates: 62°9′44″N 6°46′57″W
- State: Denmark
- Constituent country: Faroe Islands
- Island: Eysturoy
- Municipality: Runavík

Population (February 2026)
  - Total: 791
- Time zone: GMT
  - Summer (DST): UTC+1 (EST)
- Postal code: FO 480
- Climate: Cfc

Skála [ˈskɔala] is a village on the east coast of the Faroese island of Eysturoy, located in Runavík Municipality.

Its postal code is FO 480. It has a population of 791 (February 2026). The current church in the village was opened in 1940.

Skála is home to the largest shipyard in the Faroe Islands, with its fine harbour and good reputation for shipbuilding and repairs.

The village was officially renamed to gramaticaly incorrect Skála (in akkusativ case) as opposed to previously used Skáli (in nominativ) in November 2010.

== Sports ==
The village football team is called Skála Ítróttarfelag or Skála ÍF and the Skála Stadium is capable of accommodating 2,000 spectators. They compete in MeistaraDeildin, the Faroese Premier League.

The women's team is called EB-streymur/Skála.

Skála is also home to Stranda Ítróttarfelag shortened StÍF, a handball team that competes in the top division of the Faroese handball league.

== See also ==
- List of towns in the Faroe Islands
