= Lamba (Faroe Islands) =

- Village
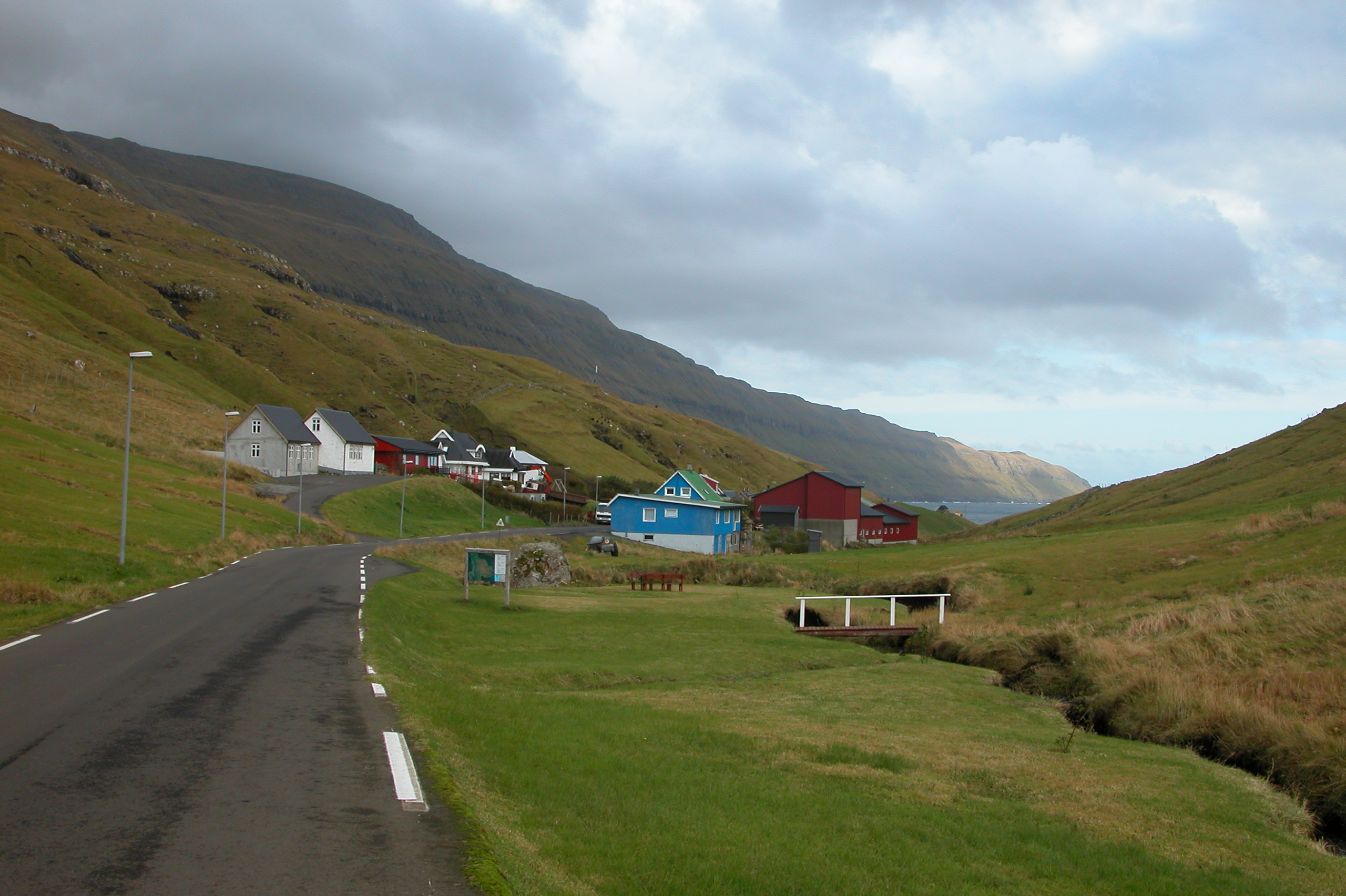
- Lamba

- Location in the Faroe Islands
- Coordinates: 62°8′33″N 6°42′8″W
- State: Kingdom of Denmark
- Constituent country: Faroe Islands
- Island: Eysturoy
- Municipality: Runavíkar kommuna

Population (September 2025)
  - Total: 155
- Time zone: GMT
  - Summer (DST): UTC+1 (EST)
- Postal code: FO 627
- Climate: Cfc

Lamba (from Old Norse Lamb-hagi 'lamb outfield', Danish: Lamhauge), is a small village in the bottom of the inlet of Lambavík on the east coast of Eysturoy, Faroe Islands.

== See also ==
- List of towns in the Faroe Islands
