= Søldarfjørður =

- Village
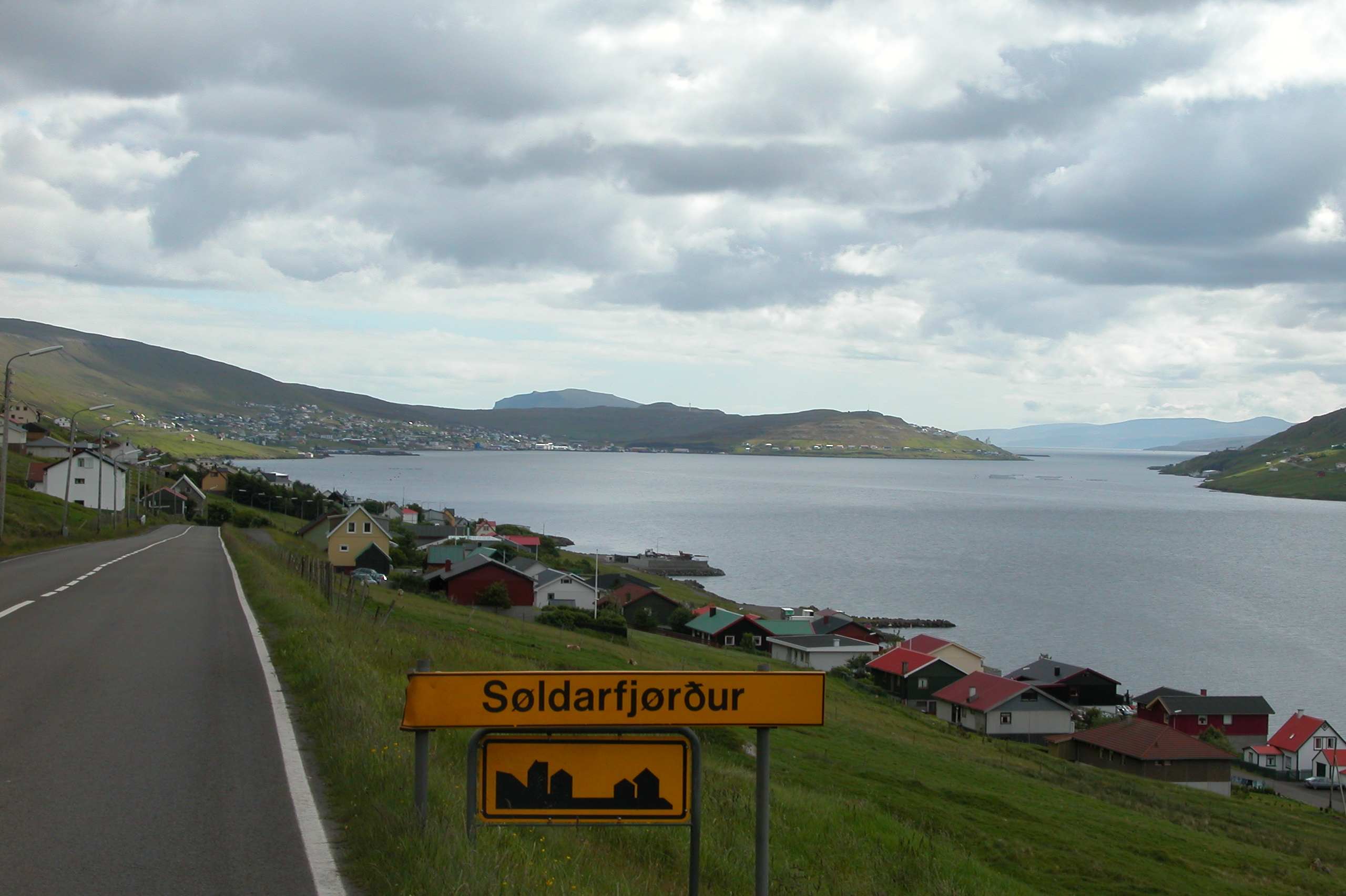
- Søldarfjørður

- Location in the Faroe Islands
- Coordinates: 62°9′35″N 6°45′4″W
- State: Kingdom of Denmark
- Constituent country: Faroe Islands
- Island: Eysturoy
- Municipality: Runavík Municipality

Population (September 2025)
  - Total: 320
- Time zone: GMT
  - Summer (DST): UTC+1 (EST)
- Postal code: FO 660
- Climate: Cfc

Søldarfjørður (Danish: Solmundefjord) is a village in the south of the Faroese island of Eysturoy in Runavík Municipality.

The 2002 population was 344. Its postal code was FO 344.

The village was originally called Sølmundarfjørður. The name Sølmundur refers to the great grandson of Grímur Kamban, the first Norse settler in the Faroe Islands.

== See also ==
- List of towns in the Faroe Islands
