= Runavík =

- Village
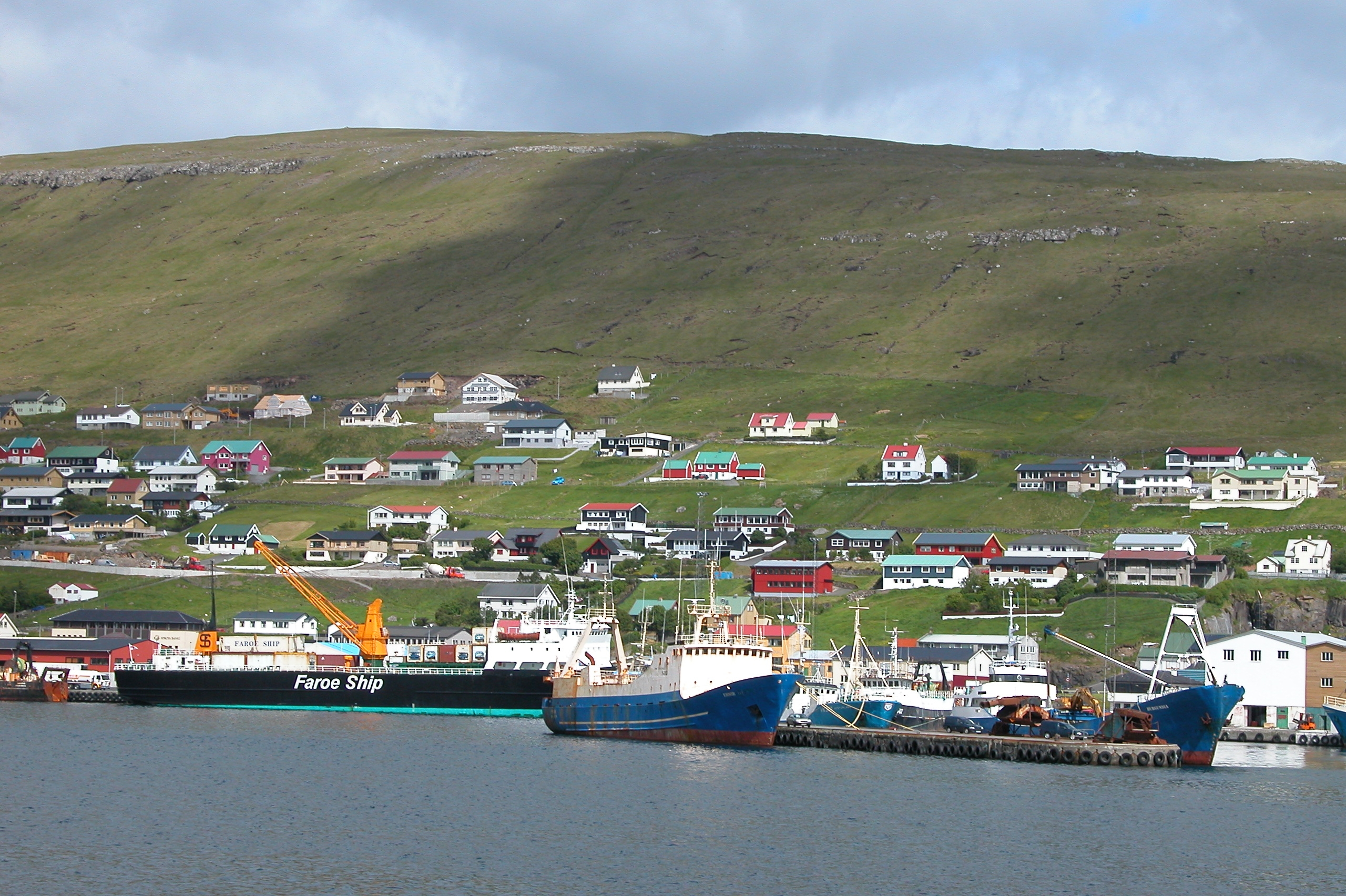
- The harbour in Runavík

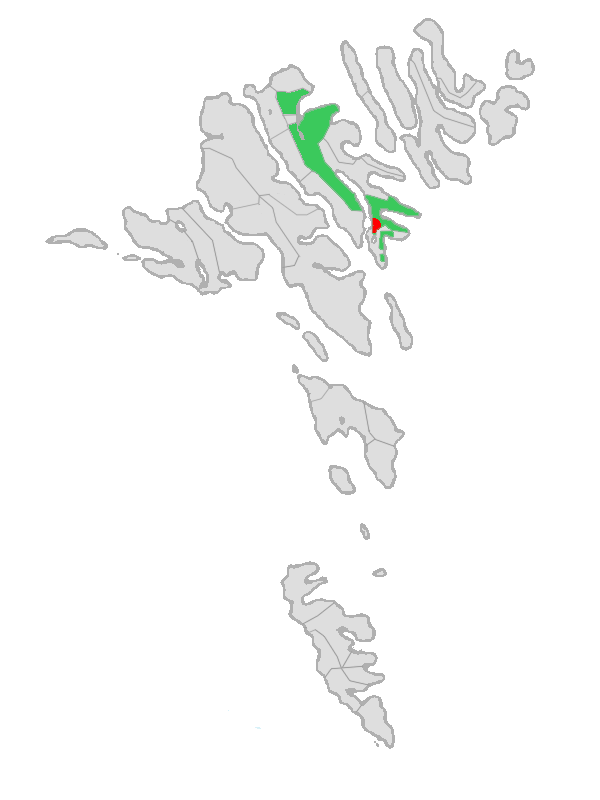
- Location of Runavík in Runavíkar kommuna in the Faroe Islands

- Location of Runavík village in the Faroe Islands
- Coordinates: 62°06′34″N 6°43′9″W
- State: Kingdom of Denmark
- Constituent country: Faroe Islands
- Island: Eysturoy
- Municipality: Runavík
- Founded: 1916
- Elevation: 0 m (0 ft)

Population (September 2025)
  - Total: 562
- Time zone: GMT
  - Summer (DST): UTC+1 (EST)
- Postal code: FO 620
- Climate: Cfc
- Website: www.runavik.fo

Runavík is a comparatively urbanised village in Runavík Municipality, Faroe Islands. It lies on the south half of the isle of Eysturoy.

== Port ==
Founded in 1916, Runavík has an important port, originally used predominantly by fishing boats but now also a key supply base for the North Sea oil industry as well as a trans-shipment port for freight to and from Europe. The harbour underwent development in the late 1990s and can now accommodate cruise ships.

== Eysturoyartunnilin ==
A massive infrastructure project has been mounted to build an 11 km-long sub-sea tunnel between Runavík and Tórshavn, thereby significantly reducing travel times to the capital. Construction costs are estimated to be around 1 billion Faroese króna. In 2014 all political parties of the Faroese parliament agreed on how and when to build the Eysturoyartunnilin and the Sandoyartunnilin. The drillings started in 2016 regarding the Eysturoyartunnilin, which opened to the public in December 2020. The work on the Sandoyartunnilin began in 2019. The first step in the projects was to fill out a platform of land in the sea at Saltnes near Runavík for the Eysturoy-tunnel.

== Sport ==
The local football club is NSÍ Runavík, a men's team who play their home games at the Runavík Stadium. They were Faroe Islands Premier League winners in 2007. In 2020 a women's team was founded.

== Sister Cities ==
Runavík is twinned with

- Hjørring, Denmark
- Ísafjörður, Iceland
- Egilsstaðir, Iceland
- Uummannaq, Greenland

== See also ==
- List of towns in the Faroe Islands
