= Eysturoy =

Eysturoy Østerø (Danish)
- Island
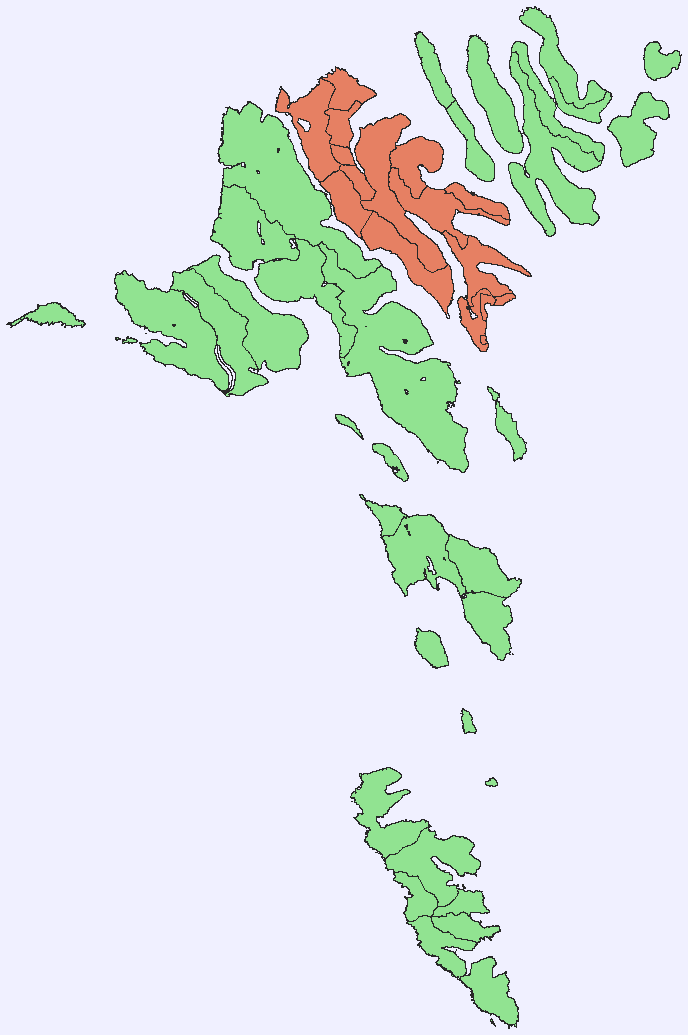
- Location within the Faroe Islands
- Coordinates: 62°13′N 6°53′W
- State: Kingdom of Denmark
- Constituent country: Faroe Islands
- Region: Eysturoy

Area
  - Total: 286.3 km^{2} (110.5 sq mi)
  - Rank: 2

Population (12-2018)
  - Total: 11,490
  - Rank: 2
  - Density: 40.13/km^{2} (103.9/sq mi)
- Time zone: UTC+0 (GMT)
  - Summer (DST): UTC+1 (EST)
- Calling code: 298590683

Eysturoy (Faroese pronunciation: ['ɛstroi], meaning 'East Island') is a region and the second-largest of the Faroe Islands, both in size and population.

== Description ==
Eysturoy is separated by a narrow sound from the main island of Streymoy. Eysturoy is extremely rugged, with some 66 separate mountain peaks, including Slættaratindur, the highest peak in the archipelago at 880 metres (2,890 ft). The country's two longest fjords, Skálafjørður in the south and Funningsfjørður in the north, almost split the island in two halves. The isthmus in between, Millum Fjarða, is one of the flattest areas in the country. Important settlements on Eysturoy are Fuglafjørður in the north and the densely populated area of the municipalities of Runavík and Nes in the south.

Eysturoy is connected with Streymoy by the Streymin Bridge over the Sundini. Leirvík on the east coast of the island is the gateway for transport connections to the north-eastern islands, particularly Klaksvík on the island of Borðoy, which is the Faroes' second-largest town. In December 2020, the sub-sea Eysturoyartunnilin (the Eysturoy Tunnel) was opened, creating a direct link between Runavík, Strendur, and Tórshavn.

Sites of interest on Eysturoy include the villages of Eiði and Gjógv, the latter having a small natural port in a rock column; the Blásastova historical museum in the village of Gøta; and the 18 °C (64 °F) varmakelda (thermal springs) of Fuglafjørður. Off the northern tip of the island are the basalt sea stacks Risin og Kellingin.

The town of Glyvrar on the eastern coast of Eysturoy is the home base for Bakkafrost, the largest company in the Faroe Islands. Bakkafrost is the eighth-largest fishing company worldwide. Four out of ten Premier league football clubs are in Eysturoy: IF (Fuglafjørður), NSÍ (Runavík), Skála ÍF and Víkingur (Leirvík). There are regional rowing festivals in Fuglafjørður (Varmakelda), Runavík (Eystanstevna), and one that alternates between Skáli, Strendur, and Vestmanna (Fjarðastevna). Accepted grind beaches are in Fuglafjørður, Funningsfjørður, Norðra- and Syðragøta, Norðskáli and Skálafjørður.

== Important Bird Area ==
The north, north-east, and south-east coasts of the island have been identified as an Important Bird Area by BirdLife International because of their significance as seabird breeding sites, especially for Manx shearwaters (2500 pairs), European storm petrels (500 pairs) and black guillemots (300 pairs).

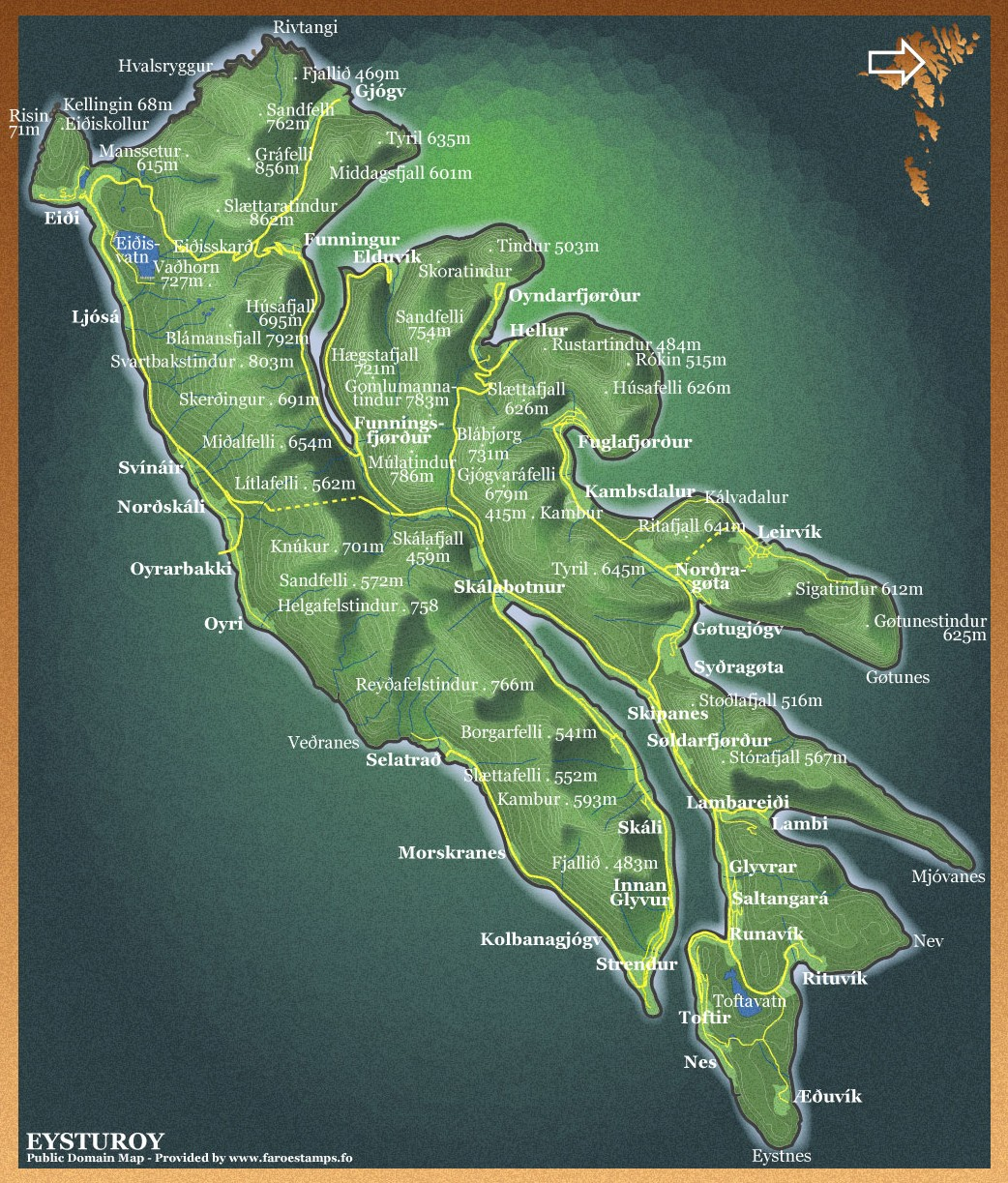
Map of Eysturoy

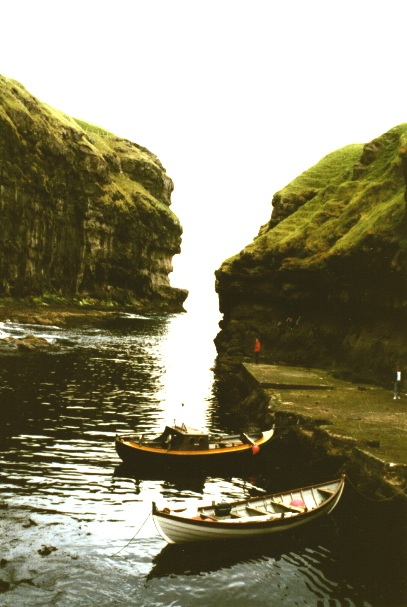
Gjógv harbour
