= Persecution of the Jews in Schleswig-Holstein (1933–1945) =

Like other areas under Nazi Germany, Jews were persecuted in the northernmost German state Schleswig-Holstein. Before the Nazis came to power in 1933, an estimated 1,900 Jews lived in Schleswig-Holstein, mostly in Lübeck and Kiel. By the time of Nazi Germany's defeat in 1945, many of Schleswig-Holstein's Jews had been murdered in the Holocaust.

== History of the Jews in Schleswig-Holstein prior to 1933 ==
Most of the German population of the Middle Ages were baptized Christians. The Jewish minority was subjected to a centuries-long persecution. This changed following the Jewish emancipation during the Enlightenment. In Prussia, under the rule of Frederick the Great, there was limited tolerance towards the Judenregal or Schutzjude – a 'protected Jewish' status for German Jews granted by the imperial, princely, or royal courts. Jews were increasingly likely to assimilate into their Christian environment, for example, by receiving baptism and changing their names. During the Napoleonic Wars, the principle of Jewish emancipation, which had been applied in France since 1791, was applied to the occupied territories of Germany. For example, with the Prussian Edict of Emancipation of 1812, Jews living in Prussia became Prussian citizens, albeit with significant legal restrictions. The new constitutions of the North German Confederation (1866–1871) introduced a strict separation of church and state and thus placed Jews on an equal footing with German Christians. The Constitution of the German Empire (1871–1918) intended – at least in legal terms – to make all German Jews full citizens.

The introduction of Basic State Law in Schleswig-Holstein on 15 September 1848 provided a limited framework for Jewish emancipation but was only valid until 1851. Jewish emancipation also occurred in Lübeck (1848, 1852), Schleswig (1854), and Holstein (1863), and emancipation was considered formally complete with the founding of the German Reich in 1871. Until 1871, Jews in Schleswig-Holstein were mostly restricted to living in small towns.

However, the movement for legal equality for Jews met with limited approval among the Christian majority and was only hesitantly implemented in everyday life. A growing number of people, especially the bourgeoisie, held religiously motivated anti-Jewish views and believed in various antisemitic stereotypes. Thousands of citizens organized themselves in antisemitic organizations such as the Pan-German League – which was influential in the educated middle class and in politics – and later in the National Socialist German Workers' Party (NSDAP) to obstruct formal equal treatment of Jews, or to oppose non-Aryans. This zeitgeist was described during a 2011 commemoration as: "In everyday life, the members of the Jewish faith community were excluded, professionally massively disadvantaged and isolated in their social environment."

These antisemitic movements affected the willingness of Jews to emigrate. In 1925 in Germany, 563,733 people, or 0.9% of the population, considered themselves as members of the Jewish religious community; the proportion fell to 499,682 (0.8%) under the influence of the Nazi persecution of Jews in the census of 16 June 1933. By 1939, the number of Jews in the German Reich had drastically decreased to 233,973 (0.34%).

Nazi policies considerably expanded the number of persons officially registered as Jews, categorizing them according to line of descent rather than active following of Judaism. According to the German minority census of 17 May 1939, Jews had to state in detail on so-called 'supplementary forms', under threat of punishment, whether they had one or two Jewish grandparents. On this basis, the Nazi state classified them as either "full Jews" ("racial Jews") or "half Jews".

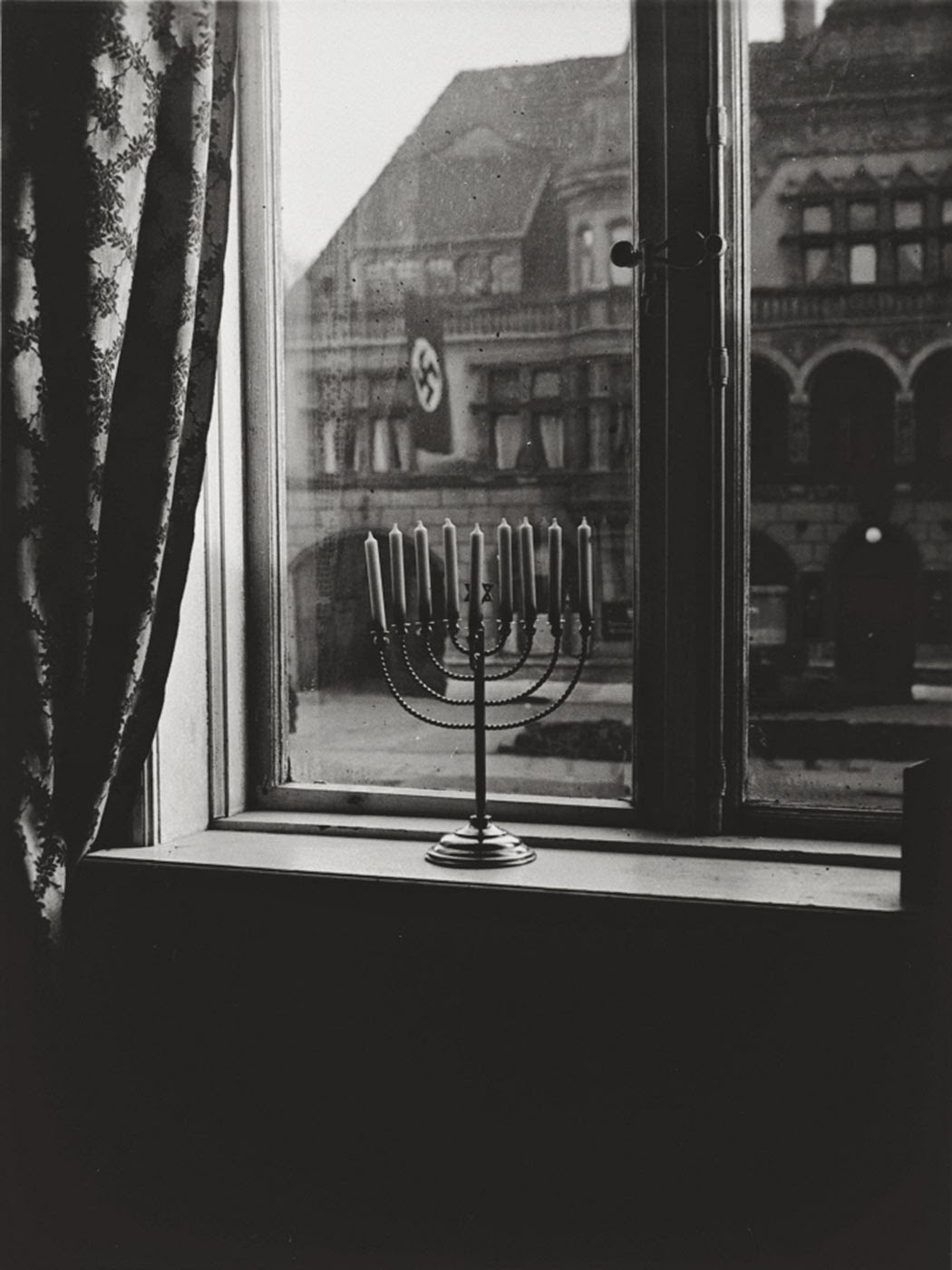
Chanukah menorah in the home of Arthur Posner, the last pre-war rabbi of Kiel (December 1931).

According to this racial delimitation, a total of 1,742 people of "Jewish descent" lived in Schleswig-Holstein in 1939, of whom 755 were so-called "full Jews", 473 "first-degree Jewish half-breeds", and 514 "second-degree Jewish half-breeds". Of the "full Jews", 575 were regarded as "Jews of faith", 136 as members of the regional Protestant or free churches, and 7 as Roman Catholics. Under the increased pressure of persecution, many Jews emigrated. For example, 17,000 mostly male adult Polish Jews living in Germany were deported in trains from Germany to Poland on 28 and 29 October 1938, within the framework of the 1938 expulsion of Polish Jews from Germany. However, the mass deportation of Polish Jews from Schleswig-Holstein initially failed due to bureaucratic mishaps; it resumed in the spring of 1939, when Jews were threatened with being deported to concentration camps if they did not leave Germany themselves in a timely manner. Most of those affected fled to Poland, Netherlands, France, and Belgium, where the German occupying power arrested them again after the start of World War II and deported them to extermination camps. The few Polish Jews who remained in the regional capital of Schleswig-Holstein, Kiel, were first deported by the Gestapo to a Judenhaus (lit. 'Jews' house', in a ghetto) in Leipzig and from there to a concentration camp.

The proportion of Jews was relatively higher in the big cities than in the countryside. This was not only due to the comparatively higher attractiveness of city life but also reflected the centuries-long official restriction of Jewish settlement. For example, Berlin had a Jewish share of 3.8%, Frankfurt 4.7%, Wrocław (Breslau) 3.2%, Cologne 2.0%, Hamburg 1.5%, Hanover 1.1%, and Kiel 0.2%. In general, there was a north–south divide in the proportion of Jews in the total population of Germany, with significantly lower proportions of Jews living in Northern Germany. Moreover, 64% of the Jewish population in Schleswig-Holstein was concentrated in the two major cities, Lübeck and Kiel, while the remaining Jews were spread over 123 smaller towns and villages.

In 1933, about 1,900 Jews lived in Schleswig-Holstein, a relatively small number. They made up only 0.13% of the state's total population, or 0.34% of all Jews in the German Reich. Within a decade, the proportion continued to decline in the face of increasing persecution. In November 1942, only 59 Jews were still living in Schleswig-Holstein, spread over 18 towns. Over 1,600 had already been deported, most of them murdered. After the war, according to the census of 29 October 1946, there were again a total of 949 people of the Jewish faith in Schleswig-Holstein, 464 of them in displaced persons camps.

== Persecution of the Jews in the Nazi regime (1933–1945) ==
=== Persecutors ===
In addition to the main Nazi Party (NSDAP) members responsible for the Holocaust, some groups and persons from Schleswig-Holstein were involved in the mass deportation and extermination of Jews both locally and in occupied territories (for instance, in the Riga Ghetto, the Reichskommissariat Ostland, and the Minsk Ghetto). The following (incomplete) table details some NS groups involved in mass killings.

The table only includes larger and exemplary smaller mass shootings. Abbreviations for Einsatzgruppen = EG, Einsatzkommando = EK, Lithuanian Activist Front = LAF, Organization of Ukrainian Nationalists = OUN, Police Battalion = PB, Special Command = SK, Security and Order Police = OP. (source: Wikipedia).

Mass killing of Jews in Schleswig-Holstein (1941–1942)
Location	Date	Criminal unit	victim
Garsden	24 June 1941	EK Tilsit	200 men, one woman
Białystok	27 June 1941	Police Battalion 309	2,000 men and women
Lviv	30 June – 2 July 1941	OUN	4,000 men
Daugavpils	1–2 July 1941	EC 1a	1,150 men
Riga	early July 1941	EG A, Lithuanian Auxiliary Police Battalions	400
Zolochiv, Lviv Oblast	early July 1941	SK 4b, OUN, SS Vikings	2,000
Ternopil	7 July 1941	SK 4b, OUN	800
Lutsk	2 July 1941	SK 4a	1,160 men
Lviv	2–6 July 1941	EC 5, 6, e.g. b. V.	2,500 men
Kaunas	4–6 July 1941	EC 3	2,977 men
Brest, Belarus	6 July 1941	PB 307	4,000 men
Białystok	8 July 1941	PB 316, 322	3,000 men
Jelgava	15 July 1941	EC 2	Jelgava massacres 1,550
Kaunas	25–28 July 1941	LAF	3,800
Lviv	29–31 July 1941	OUN	2,000
Pinsk	7–8 August 1941	SS Cavalry Brigade	9,000
Kamianets-Podilskyi	27–29 August 1941	PB 320, SS	Kamianets-Podilskyi massacre 26,500
Zhytomyr	19 September 1941	EG C, D	3.145
Kyiv, Babi Yar	29–30 September 1941	SK 4a, PB 45, 314	33,771
Belarus	from October 1941	707th Infantry Division (Wehrmacht)	19,000
Dnipro	13–14 October 1941	PB 314	11,000
Rivne	5–6 November 1941	EK 5, PB 320	15,000
Riga	30 November, 7–8 December 1941	all PB, Command Arājs	26,000
Simferopol	13–15 December 1941	EG D, Wehrmacht	12,000
Kharkiv	from 1 January 1942	PB 314	12,000
Minsk	28–30 July 1942	OP	10,000
Lutsk	19–23 August 1942	OP	14,700
Volodymyr (city)	1–3 September 1942	OP	13,500
Brest, Belarus	15–16 October 1942	OP, PB 310	19,000
Pinsk	28 October 1942	PB 306, 310	18,000

==== Individual perpetrators in Schleswig-Holstein (1933–1945) ====
- Fritz Barnekow – head of the Jewish Department II B 5 of the Gestapo in Kiel (1941–1943); one of the main organizers of the deportations of Jews from Schleswig-Holstein (from 1941 to 1945).
- Franz von Baselli – 1931 local NS-group leader of Pinneberg who was appointed as the successor to Dr. Adolph Herting in Schleswig and rewarded with the office of mayor in Schleswig (1934–1936). In January 1936, he was appointed Gauamtsleiter ('Gau office leader') for local affairs. He made a significant contribution to the implementation of Nazi administrative principles in all local authorities of his jurisdiction in accordance with the municipal code revised in 1935.
- Heinz Behrens (born 7 July 1903, in Vegesack near Bremen) – joined the NSDAP in 1928 and received the Golden Party Badge. In 1940, Behrens succeeded Albert Malzan as Nazi consultant in Schleswig-Holstein. He resigned from office when he moved to Energieversorgung Ostland GmbH in occupied Riga in 1941. During World War II, he was the first Director of Energy Supply for the Baltic States and later for all conquered war economies in the occupied Soviet Eastern Territories. From March 1943 until the end of the war, he was director of the Energy Management Department at Reichswerke Hermann Göring and worked in Berlin-Halensee. After his imprisonment in 1945, as well as subsequent internment and denazification, he worked in cooperation with Dr. Gottfried Cremer in the BAK (Business Research Working Group on Ceramics). Both had already worked together in Reichswerke Hermann Göring state enterprises during the war.
- Hans Bernsau – district manager of the NSDAP in the district of Schleswig (1926–1931); manager of the NSDAP district 'North-East' from 1931.
- Heinrich Blum – school inspector, district leader of the National Socialist Teachers' Association from 1925, provisional NSDAP mayor in Schleswig (1933), and a member of the 'old school' of the Nazi celebrities in Schleswig. Shortly after the Wehrmacht occupied the Baltic states, the notorious Gauleiter Hinrich Lohse commissioned him with the office of senior government and school councilor in the civil administration of the Reichskommissariat Ostland.
- Peter Börnsen – served from January 1933 to 1945 as NSDAP district leader in Eckernförde and from 1939 to 1942 as deputy of the Schleswig district leader Dr. George Carstensen, who was deployed in the war. He was elected to the Prussian state parliament in 1932 and was a member of the Reichstag from 1933 to 1945. After the end of the war, he was interned for 37 months and sentenced to six years in prison in 1949. In the appeal proceedings, the sentence was reduced to three years.
- Paul Carell (1911–1997) – German diplomat and Nazi journalist. As a student of psychology at Kiel University, he headed the 'combat committee against the un-German spirit' at the university. These 'combat committees' agitated against 'Jewish intellectualism' as spearheads of the Deutsche Studentenschaft ('German student body'). In World War II, Carell was Chief Press Officer of the foreign minister Joachim von Ribbentrop and an SS-Obersturmbannführer. In May 1944, Schmidt gave advice on how to justify the deportation and murder of Hungarian Jews in order to avoid accusations of mass murder. From 1965 to 1971, the public prosecutor of Verden investigated Paul Schmidt-Carell for murder. The preliminary investigation, which was supposed to clarify his involvement in the murder of Hungarian Jews, was dropped without finding anything. As a result, Schmidt-Carell never had to answer to a court for his activities in the Nazi state.
- Georg Carstensen – member of the 'old school' of Nazi militants in Schleswig-Holstein. After 1945, the jury found that Carstensen must have been aware of all criminal acts due to his membership in the regional leadership corps of the NSDAP. He was accused of criminal acts, such as the execution of foreign workers in the Schleswig district, the arrests made in the city of Schleswig as a result of the 20 July plot (1944), and the transport of inmates of the sanatorium and nursing home in Meseritz and Bernburg. He was also accused of involvement in an incident in Leck in 1933, in which a local watchmaker was publicly chased through the streets with a sign around his neck and the inscription "I am the biggest rascal, I insulted the Reich Chancellor Adolf Hitler" because of an alleged disparagement.
- Carl Coors – NSDAP mayor in Friedrichstadt from 1937, where antisemitic measures were part of the first nationwide boycott against Jewish businesspeople on 1 April 1937.
- Georg Dahm – criminal defense lawyer and international lawyer from Kiel. Along with Friedrich Schaffstein, he was one of the most exposed representatives of Nazi criminal law theory. From 1935 to 1937, he was a pioneer of the persecution of Jews at Kiel University.
- Thomas Frahm – NSDAP local group leader in Schuby, where he is said to have exercised a "regime of terror".
- Gustav Frenssen (19 October 1863 – 11 April 1945; born and died in Barlt, Dithmarschen) – German writer of the Nazi movement and of the Völkisch movement. From 1932 onwards, he was a pioneer of the Nazi state ideology by publicly taking sides against 'Jews and Jewish artists' before and during the Nazi period. Frenssen was largely to blame for the crimes against the Jews during the Nazi regime.
- Otto Gestefeld – district deputy, deputy district administrator of Schleswig, and member of the NSDAP 'old combatants' in district of Schleswig.
- Hans Gewecke – NSDAP district leader in the Duchy of Saxe-Lauenburg. He worked as a district commissioner in the Lithuanian city of Šiauliai (1941–1944).
- Emil Gosch – NSDAP local group leader in Silberstedt.
- Carl Wilhelm Hahn – journalist and editor, historian, archivist, and head of the Landessippenamt ('state tribe office') Schleswig-Holstein in the Nazi regime.
- Claus-Peter Hans – initially an NSDAP local group leader in Seeth / Drage, Nordfriesland, and then district leader in the district of Flensburg county (July 1932 – May 1945). He was also a personal union district administrator and district deputy (October 1935 – November 1937), and deputy district administrator (1933–1935, 1941–1945).
- Ernst Hansen – Kreisbauernführer ('district farmer leader') who, together with other regional NSDAP leading figures, mistreated and abused a worker, forcing him to carry a placard with the inscription "I am a usurer and cutthroat" hung around his neck, chasing him through the city of Schleswig.
- Erich Hasse – belonged to the hard core of the regional NSDAP. He was plant manager of the district shipping line. His fellow party members, G. Knutzen and H. Reincke, both active in Schleswig's Sturmabteilung (SA) and Schutzstaffel (SS) storms since 1930 and 1931 respectively, were employed with him to accommodate the 'old combatants'.
- Ferdinand Jans – Kreisbetriebsgemeinschaftsleiter ('district company leader') of the Deutschen Arbeiterverband ('German workers' association') of the construction industry in the district of Schleswig in 1933. He then became the district administrator of the German Labour Front (DAF). As such, he was appointed by the mayor of Baselli on 27 November 1935 as an honorary deputy in the city of Schleswig.
- Jürgen Jöns (from Erfde) – was one of the early Nazi agitators in Schleswig; he was a member of the district council as second district deputy until his death.
- Ernst Kolbe – SS member who, during the occupation of Denmark, went to Copenhagen as a Hauptscharführer and worked as a Gestapo employee. He was killed by Danish resistance fighters during the storming of the Shellhuset (the Gestapo headquarters in Copenhagen) on 21 March 1945. Kolbe's brutality and unscrupulousness became particularly clear in the 'protective custody measures' of political dissidents, staged in the course of the Nazi 'takeover', and in further persecution actions, such as in the municipality of Börm near Schleswig.
- Hans Kolbe – naval officer and retired Vice Admiral who fought in the civil war-like conflicts in the wake of the Kapp Putsch (13 March 1920) in a leading position against armed revolutionary workers squads in the Ruhr area. In October 1936, he became Gauamtsleiter of the Reichskolonialbund. In 1941, he was appointed 'honorary' Standartenführer of the Security Service of the SS. For the public and unlawful executions of Polish foreign workers in Sieverstedt near Flensburg and Dollrottfeld in 1941, he had transported by truck more than 100 prisoners of war from the Schleswig district. Kolbe was also aware of an arbitrary execution of Polish foreign workers by the Gestapo near Kropp in November 1941.
- Hinrich Lohse – Gauleiter (regional leader) of Schleswig-Holstein and a notorious war criminal most known for his rule of the Reichskommissariat Ostland during World War II.
- Albert Malzahn (born 1899) – district economic advisor in Schleswig-Holstein (1934–1943); managing director, Elmshorn; President of the IHK Kiel; Chairman of the Landesbank of the province of Schleswig-Holstein.
- Joachim Meyer-Quade – NSDAP official and Sturmabteilung (SA) Obergruppenführer, and co-founder of the SA in the district of Schleswig. He briefly served as the Gauleiter of Gau Schleswig-Holstein. Through his work for the party in Schleswig, he managed a career leap that led him to high offices within the Nazi hierarchy as the 1932 District Leadership for the NSDAP "North-East District", with the areas of Flensburg, Schleswig, and Eckernförde. In this capacity, he took part in the storm on 10 July 1932, arranged by SA men of 'Sturm IV/86', on the Eckernförde union building, during which two social-democratic farm workers were stabbed to death. Elected to the district council on 12 May 1933, he was appointed district administrator of the Schleswig district. Promoted to brigade leader of the SA group Nordmark on 1 February 1934, Gauleiter Hinrich Lohse appointed him chief of police of Kiel in October 1934. In the same year, he also became an assessor in the People's Court (Germany) a Sondergericht ('special court') of Nazi Germany in Berlin. In 1938, he was appointed SA-Obergruppenführer in the Nordmark. As such, he issued the order to plunder and destroy the synagogues in Schleswig-Holstein and to arrest the Jewish population on the pogrom night of Kristallnacht. When war broke out, he left Schleswig-Holstein, volunteered for military service, and was killed as a lieutenant in the 6th Infantry Regiment on 10 September 1939 at Piątek. His grave became a "place of pilgrimage" for his fellow combatants in Schleswig.
- Hinrich Möller – SS-Brigadeführer and Generalmajor of police. In the Reichspogromnacht, Möller was one of the main actors in the crimes committed against Jews in Schleswig-Holstein.
- Ernst Paulsen, Dr. – NSDAP local group leader from the very beginning in Schleswig, from 1 March 1925.
- Max Plaut (born 1901) – lawyer, economist, and Jewish association official. From 1939, head of the Northwest Germany district office of the Reich Association of Jews in Germany. In this function, he was also responsible for the concerns of the Jews in Schleswig-Holstein and Lower Saxony.
- Ernst Ramcke – member of the SA from 1928, in which he, promoted to Obersturmführer, led the 'Schleswiger Sturm 23/86'. Ramcke also acted as district speaker for the party and district professional administrator of the German Labour Front (DAF) and, honoured with the Golden Party Badge, belonged to the Nazi 'old combatants'. Incidentally, together with Bruno Steen, he belonged to the circle of informers who, from May 1933, were systematically involved in dismissals for political reasons in the city administration.
- Ernst Graf zu Reventlow (1869–1943) – he ran unsuccessfully for the Reichstag in 1907 and 1912 for the antisemitic German Social Reform Party in the Flensburg–Apenrade constituency. After 1918, he became involved in right-wing extremist groups before joining the NSDAP in 1927, which he represented in the Reichstag until his death.
- Hermann Riecken – NSDAP member from the very beginning; mayor of Heikendorf (1933–1939), and district chairman of the city of Flensburg (from 1939). From 1941, he was a Nazi regional commissioner in the Estonian district of Pärnu County (German: Pärnau) and in the Latvian city of Daugavpils (German: Dünaburg) (1942–1944). Involved in Nazi atrocities.
- Roland Siegel, Dr. – he became provisional district administrator in Schleswig in 1933. In December 1932, he worked as a senior administrative officer in the political department of the Berlin police chief, and after 30 January 1933, as head of personnel in a key position. He was a close associate of the Nazi police chief, the retired Rear Admiral von Levetzow, and played a key role in the political cleansing of the civil service. At the beginning of May 1933, he was promoted to the Prussian Ministry of the Interior. On 1 October 1933, he was appointed as senior civil servant.
- Kurt Stawizki – Freikorps in Stein, Schleswig-Holstein (near Kiel) from 1919; Gestapo in Hamburg from 1933. From mid-October 1940, he was Commander of the Security Police and SD-Commander (KdS) in Kraków (Poland). From July 1941, he was head of the Gestapo in Lemberg (Ukraine), and was involved in the Massacre of Lwów professors.
- Bruno Steen – Ortsgruppenleiter in Schleswig who was notorious for his actions against the Jewish brothers Max and Bernhard Weinberg in Schleswig, whom he publicly insulted as 'Jewish rascals'. The Weinberg family lost their German citizenship on 3 April 1934, but received it back after a successful appeal on 17 September 1935 without any justification. Max Bernhard and Bernhard Weinberg survived the war as ‘half Jews’.
- Erich Straub, Dr. med. – first NSDAP city councilor in Schleswig. In 1930, he became head of the district department for public health and racial welfare of the NSDAP. In November 1933, he was promoted to provincial councilor, entrusted with the management of welfare education. Between February 1941 and March 1943, he also worked as an expert for the Nazi T-4 Euthanasia Program. He belonged to the NSDAP clique of the 'old combatants' in Schleswig.
- Jürgen Tams – farmer in Groß Rheide who was an NSDAP local group leader from April 1929. From 1 February 1931, he was storm leader of an SA storm initially comprising 30 members, which grew to over 300 members by the end of 1932. In 1930, he took over the post of district agricultural adviser for the Nazi party.
- Albert Zerrahn – Master fisherman and innkeeper involved in the local NSDAP group in Tolk since 1925, and a member of the 'old combatants'. Carl Zerrahn's "Waldlust" was considered the "nucleus of the movement" in the Schleswig district. In 1933, despite public protests, he also became head of the Nübel office. Zerrahn and his son Wilhelm were close friends with Hinrich Lohse.
- Wilhelm Zerrahn – joined the Schutzstaffel (SS) in 1931, where he purposefully pursued a career. In 1934, he first became SS-Oberscharführer in Flensburg. He served as SS-Brigadeführer in the 50th SS Staff Department until 1937, and from November 1937 on the SS Staff. In December 1940, he was appointed SS group leader. In April 1941, he was promoted to Sicherheitsdienst (SD) group leader, and a short time later he was promoted to senior group leader in the Reich Security Main Office.

==== Perpetrators who worked in Schleswig-Holstein after 1945 ====
- Hans-Adolf Asbach – NSDAP district captain of the Ukrainian Auxiliary Police in occupied Poland and in Galicia; served as minister of Social Affairs of Schleswig-Holstein (1950–1957).
- Paul Carell (see above) – continued to work after 1945. As late as the 1970s, for example, he wrote political columns under the pseudonym Vocator in the newspaper group Norddeutsche Rundschau, in Itzehoe – under chief editor Heinz Longerich, the father of Peter Longerich one of the leading German authorities on the Holocaust – and in the German weekly news magazine Der Spiegel – in which, in an article on 16 January 1957, he launched the thesis that Marinus van der Lubbe was the sole perpetrator who exonerated the Nazis in the Reichstag fire of 1933.
- Hartmut Gerstenhauer – district administrator in the German occupation of Poland (1939–1945). He was involved in the organization of the Holocaust in the Lublin district as district captain and senior official of the district administration. He was a judge at the State Social Court Schleswig-Holstein from 1954, and President of the Senate at the Schleswig-Holstein State Social Court in Schleswig from 1962.
- Werner Heyde (1902–1964) – German psychiatrist who was one of the main organizers of Nazi Germany's T-4 Euthanasia Program. The film The Heyde-Sawade Affair is about him.
- Hartmann Lauterbacher (from Salem, Schleswig-Holstein) – from 1927, he was Chief of Staff and deputy Reich youth leader of the Hitler Youth, NSDAP, Gauleiter of the Gau ‘South Hanover-Brunswick’, Oberpräsident of the Province of Hanover, and SS-Obergruppenführer. From 1950, he worked for the Gehlen Organization the intelligence agency (established in June 1946), and later for the Federal Intelligence Service until 1963.
- Hans-Werner Otto – State Secretary and "occupation specialist" (according to the book Braunbuch) of the German Democratic Republic. He was regional commissioner in Nikolayev, Reichskommissariat Ukraine (from April 1942), State Secretary in the Ministry of Social Affairs, Kiel, under Minister Hans-Adolf Asbach (1950–1964), and Secretary of State in the Schleswig-Holstein Ministry of the Interior (1967–1971, 1971).

=== Informers ===
Persecuted Jews were often only revealed to the Gestapo through denunciation. In the family context, men were by far the most frequent victims of denunciation. They were denounced most frequently by women, not least from their own families. In the area of the special court in Kiel, 12% of all complaints came from the family; 92% of them were reimbursed by women. Most of these so-called 'Judas women' were not held accountable after the war, but continued to live unchallenged.

=== Victims ===
For a list of names of persecuted Jews in Schleswig-Holstein in the period 1933–1945, see Gedenkbuch – Opfer der Verfolgung der Juden unter der nationalsozialistischen Gewaltherrschaft 1933–1945 ('Memorial Book - Victims of the persecution of the Jews under the National Socialist tyranny 1933–1945').

==== Individual persecuted Jews in Schleswig-Holstein ====
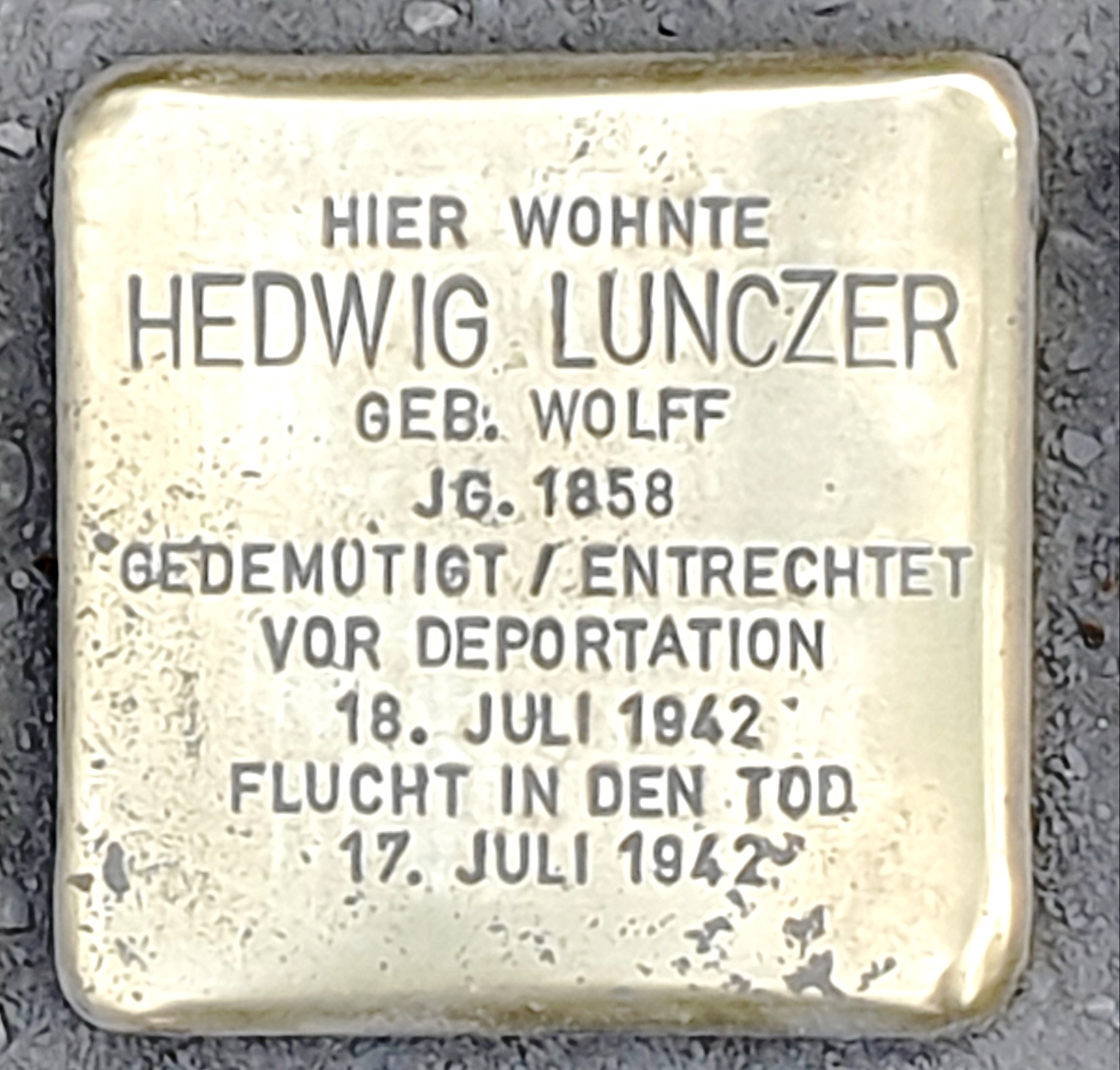
Stolperstein in memory of Hedwig Lunczer, née Wolff, born in 1858, died on 17 July 1942 in Heikendorf

- Heinz Salomon – SPD politician who was taken to the Theresienstadt concentration camp in the last transport with Jews from Schleswig-Holstein on 14 February 1945 and returned to the city of Kiel seriously ill as the first Jew after the war.
- Nathan Israel Cohn (1862–1942) and his family – Cohn worked as a painter in Heikendorf. His wife Hanna Cohn (born Lunczer) died "of old age" in the mental hospital of Neustadt in Holstein in April 1941, and her sister, Hedwig Lunczer, committed suicide on 17 June 1942 after she had received her deportation order. According to the official version, N.I. Cohn himself died after his imprisonment on 13 March 1942 from "bladder cancer and constriction of the bladder".
- Joseph Carlebach (1883–1942) – chief rabbi of Altona from 1925 to 1936, when the city was still part of the Province of Schleswig-Holstein (it was absorbed into Hamburg by the Greater Hamburg Act of 1937). He then became chief rabbi of Hamburg, from where he was deported to the Jungfernhof concentration camp near Riga in December 1941 and murdered, together with his wife and three of his daughters, in the Dünamünde Action on 26 March 1942.
- For trade unionists and KPD members in Schleswig-Holstein, see
- For Jehovah's Witnesses in Schleswig-Holstein see

== Places of remembrance ==
=== Synagogues in Schleswig-Holstein ===
During Kristallnacht – the pogrom on the night of 9–10 November 1938 – violent measures against Jews were organized and controlled by Nazi Germany. Over 1,400 synagogues, prayer rooms, and other meeting rooms, as well as thousands of shops, apartments, and Jewish cemeteries were destroyed, at least four of them in Schleswig-Holstein. The pogroms marked a transition from discrimination against German Jews to systematic persecution, which culminated in the Holocaust almost three years later.

A list of synagogues destroyed in Nazi Germany from 1933 to 1945 can be found in the German Wikipedia: Synagogues destroyed in Nazi Germany (1933–1945). Those in Schleswig-Holstein include:

1. Synagogue (Ahrensburg), destroyed in the November pogrom of 1938
2. Synagogue Elmshorn, destroyed in the November pogrom of 1938
3. Synagogue Goethestraße, Kiel, destroyed in the November pogrom of 1938
4. Synagogue (Lübeck), the interior was destroyed during the November pogrom of 1938
5. Synagogue (Rendsburg), the interior was destroyed during the November pogrom of 1938

=== Jewish cemeteries in Schleswig Holstein ===
The desecration of Jewish cemeteries with politically motivated slogans like "Jews out", "Heil Hitler", "we'll fill up the 7 million [murdered Jews]", or with Judensau, SS runes, and swastikas, took place en masse in Germany during the time of Nazi Germany. According to estimates by the historian Julius H. Schoeps, 80 to 90 percent of the approximately 1,700 Jewish resting places in the German Reich were desecrated during this period. Statistical information on how many cemeteries were affected in Schleswig-Holstein is not available.

Jewish cemeteries were desecrated in various ways, first through direct damage, which had been frequent since 1938. From 1942, however, desecration also occurred through actions as part of the Reichsmetallspende, which offered a pretext for removing bars and other metal objects from Jewish cemeteries. SA men and Hitler Youth took the opportunity to smash stone graves. The Reichsinstitut für Geschichte des neuen Deutschlands had the deceased exhumed in order to carry out "skull and other bone measurements". By desecrating the cemeteries, the perpetrators sought to destroy the religiously based durability of the burial sites and the memory of Jewish life. The Nazis wanted to erase its symbolic presence and violate the dignity of both the deceased and their relatives.

For believing Jews, grave desecration is particularly serious because the grave is intended for eternity in a Jewish cemetery ('burial house' or 'house of eternity'). This corresponds to one of the most fundamental tenets of Jewish Halakha. The burial is mandatory and permanent peace of the dead is considered mandatory. Unlike in Christianity, a tomb may not be reoccupied. An exhumation or relocation of a grave is – apart from very special circumstances – not permitted. A disturbance of the peace of the dead causes a deep psychological dismay in the Jewish community and in some cases increases a 'persistent mourning disorder' among relatives. A tombstone (Hebrew: מצבה, romanized: Mazewa) symbolizes the obligation not to forget the deceased.

With the resurgence of antisemitism in Germany, over 2,000 Jewish cemeteries have again been desecrated since the end of the war. Commenting on the increasing desecration of Jewish cemeteries in the 1950s, Theodor W. Adorno said, "The destruction of Jewish cemeteries is not an expression of anti-Semitism, it is itself anti-Semitism."

==== List of Jewish cemeteries in Schleswig-Holstein ====
(The following entries are only available in the German Wikipedia)

- Jewish Cemetery (Lübeck-Moisling)
- Jewish Cemetery (Lübeck, Schönböckener Straße)
- Old Jewish Cemetery (Kiel)
- Jewish Cemetery (Eutin)
- Jewish Cemetery Glückstadt
- Old Jewish Cemetery (Bad Segeberg)
- Old Jewish Cemetery (Friedrichstadt)
- Jewish Cemetery (Ahrensburg)
- Jewish Cemetery (Stockelsdorf)
- Jewish Cemetery Elmshorn
- Jewish Cemetery Westerrönfeld
- Jewish Cemetery (Neustadt in Holstein)
- Jewish Museum Rendsburg
- Jewish Children's Home Föhr

=== "Jews' houses" in Schleswig-Holstein ===
The Judenhäuser (lit. 'Jews' houses') were larger residential buildings from (formerly) Jewish property that the Nazi state converted into ghetto houses from 1939 onwards. Here, the Gestapo forcibly quartered people declared "of Jewish descent" according to the Nuremberg Race Laws of 1935. The buildings were clearly marked on the outside and were subject to Gestapo surveillance. In Kiel, the Jews were concentrated in the Gängeviertel where two "Jews' houses" existed: at Kleiner Kuhberg 25, on the corner of Feuergang 2, and at Flämische Straße 22a.

On 6 December 1941, the first 977 Jews from the Hamburg, Lüneburg, and the Schleswig-Holstein area were deported in a collective transport to the Jungfernhof concentration camp near Riga, including more than 40 from the Kiel area and 86 from Lübeck. A second collective transport with a total of 801 Jews from the same region led directly to KZ Theresienstadt on 19 July 1942. The last 'Jewish-born' residents of these houses in Schleswig-Holstein were deported in mid-1943. Most of the deportees who survived the Riga Ghetto and Minsk Ghetto later died in other extermination camps (see also Judenhäuser in der Stadt Braunschweig [lit. 'Jews' houses in the city of Braunschweig']). A total of around 240 Jews from Kiel became victims of Nazi persecution.

=== Nazi concentration camp sub-camps in Schleswig-Holstein area ===
The following is a list of Nazi concentration camp sub-camps in the area:

1. Kaltenkirchen concentration camp – a satellite camp of Neuengamme concentration camp
2. KZ satellite camp Kiel – a temporary satellite camp of the Neuengamme concentration camp
3. Husum-Schwesing concentration camp, a satellite camp of the Neuengamme concentration camp; located in the Engelsburg district of Schwesingen, northeast of Husum
4. KZ Ahrensbök (1933–34) – an early ("wild") concentration camp for Nazi opponents: mostly communists, social democrats, and trade unionists
5. KZ Kuhlen (18 July 1933 – 27 October 1933) – early ("wild") camp in Kuhlen near Rickling, Germany, in Schleswig-Holstein; most of the prisoners were communists and social democrats
6. KZ Eutin (July 1933 – May 1934) – an early ("wild") concentration camp in Eutin, mainly for communists, social democrats, trade unionists, and others unpopular with the Nazi regime
7. Concentration camp Ladelund (November 1944) – located in Ladelund about 20 km northeast of Niebüll on the German–Danish border, as a satellite camp of the Neuengamme concentration camp in connection with the construction of the Friesenwall ('Frisian Wall').
8. Neustadt in Holstein Concentration Camp External Command – external work assignments in Neustadt in Holstein of the Neuengamme concentration camp; 15 concentration camp prisoners who were used for construction work in Neustadt from December 1944 to 1 May 1945.
9. KZ-Fürstengrube-Death March (also referred to as "Death March from Auschwitz to Holstein") – a death march by concentration camp prisoners as part of the evacuation of the concentration camp Fürstengrube subcamp in Upper Silesia (see a list of sub-camps of Auschwitz concentration camp sub-camps). The lack of nutrition, illness, exhaustion, abuse, and murder claimed numerous victims on this death march from January to May 1945, which had several intermediate stations.

== Literature ==
- Klaus-Dieter Alicke: From the history of the Jewish communities in the German-speaking area: Flensburg (Schleswig-Holstein) . Winsen (Aller) 2020
- Stefanie Endlich, Beate Rossié: NS perpetrators and war criminals under the protection of the church, new beginnings after 1945? (Episode 3), Evangelical-Lutheran Church in Northern Germany (Nordkirche), Hamburg 2019
- Society for Schleswig-Holstein History: Christians and Jews 1933-1945: The Evangelical-Lutheran Church (in North Elbia) under National Socialism . Society for Schleswig-Holstein History, Kiel 2020
- Bettina Goldberg: Jews in Schleswig-Holstein - A historical overview. In: Hering, Rainer (ed.): The "Night of Crystals" in Schleswig-Holstein. The November pogrom in historical context. Hamburg: Publications of the Schleswig-Holstein State Archives, Volume 109, p. 29 - 51.
- Klaus Klinger: "Ignorance instead of justice - the Schleswig-Holstein post-war justice system and the persecution of the Jews." In: Gerhard Paul, Gillis Carlebach (eds.): Menorah and swastika: On the history of the Jews in and from Schleswig-Holstein, Lübeck and Altona: 1918-1998. Wachholtz, Neumünster 1998, ISBN 3-529-06149-2, pp. 723–728
- Sebastian Lehmann: "District leader of the NSDAP in Schleswig-Holstein: Curriculum vitae and ruling practice of a regional power elite." Publishing house for regional history, Bielefeld 2007, IZRG publication series, volume 13, ISBN 3-89534-653-5
- Sebastian Lehmann: Documented for the first time: Curriculum vitae of the district leaders in the north - interview with Sebastian Lehmann about his pioneering work on Nazi research in Schleswig-Holstein. Flensburger Tageblatt, July 5, 2007
- Gerhard Paul, Gillis Carlebach (eds.): "Menorah and swastika: On the history of the Jews in and from Schleswig-Holstein, Lübeck and Altona: 1918-1998." Wachholtz, Neumünster 1998, ISBN 3-529-06149- 2
- Gerhard Paul: "The Jewish residents depend only on themselves." Jews in Schleswig-Holstein before and after 1933. In: Jewish life and persecution of Jews in Friesland. Bredstedt 2001, p. 77 –98.
- Gerhard Paul: "What will become of us remains a mystery". Exhibition in the former Rendsburg synagogue on the history of the emigration, expulsion and flight of Jews from Schleswig-Holstein (1933-1941). In: Information on contemporary Schleswig-Holstein history. Volume 38, 2000, p. 106– 111
- State Center for Political Education: To commemorate - 12/6/2011 - 70th anniversary of the deportation of Jews from Schleswig-Holstein. Background. Publication series of the State Center for Political Education Schleswig-Holstein, Kiel 2011.
