= Charles Bongaerts =

Dutch resistance hero

Charles Marie Hubert Joseph Bongaerts
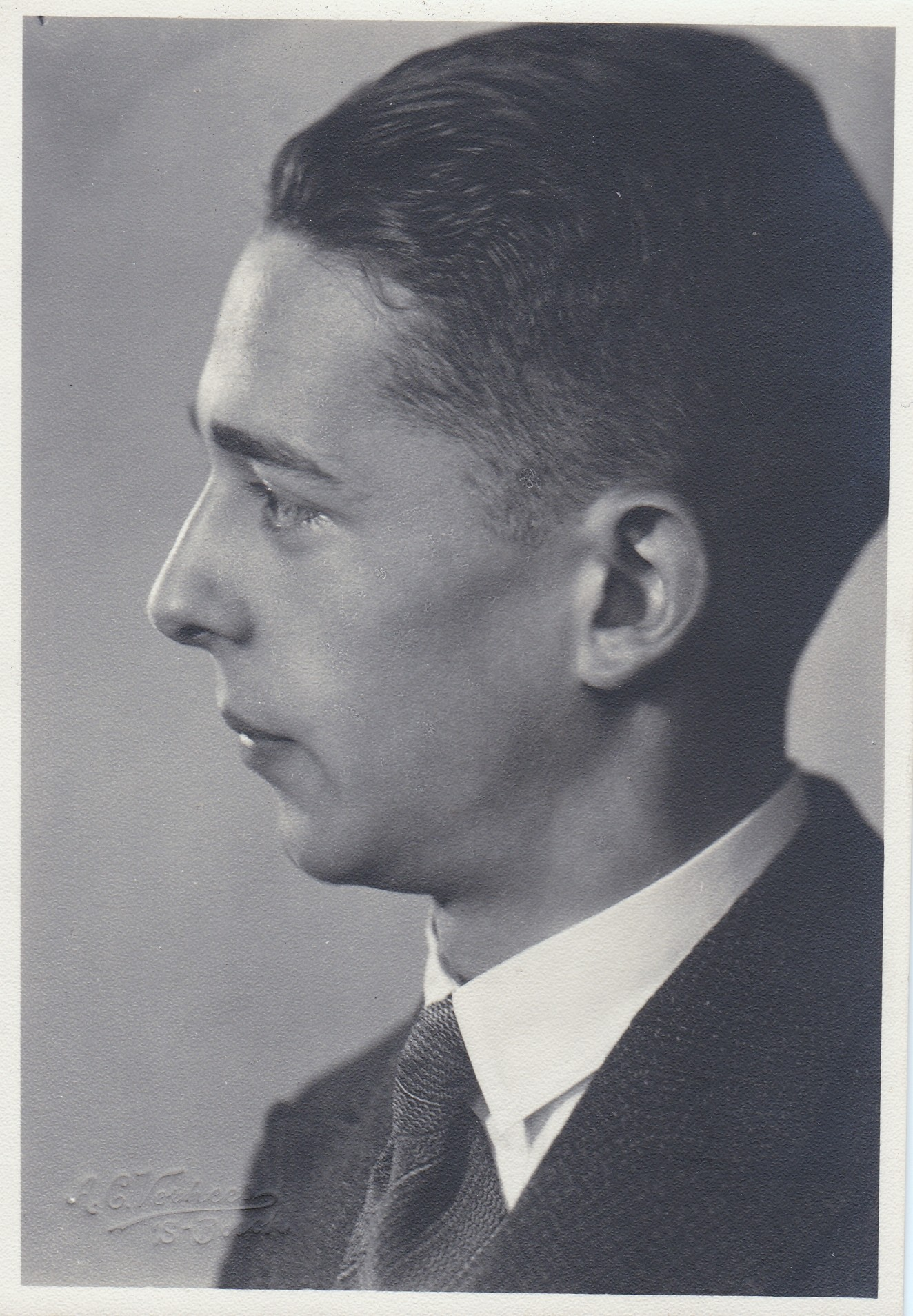
- Bongaerts as a young man.
- Born: 7 August 1909; Venlo, Limburg, Netherlands
- Died: 23 November 1944 (aged 35); Ladelund Concentration Camp, Schleswig-Holstein, Germany
- Burial place: Ladelund Concentration Camp, Schleswig-Holstein, Germany
- Citizenship: Dutch
- Occupations: Police inspector, fireman
- Era: World War II
- Organization: KP-Heerlen
- Known for: Resistance against Nazi Rule
- Movement: Dutch Resistance Movement
- Spouse: Marie-Thérèse "Tita" Dahmen (married 1940)
- Children: 2
- Family: Bongaerts
- Honours: Medal of Freedom, Resistance Memorial Cross, King's Commendation for Bravery

Charles Marie Hubert Joseph Bongaerts (7 August 1909 - 23 November 1944) was a Dutch resistance hero during World War II.

== Early life and career ==
Bongaerts was born in Venlo in 1909 into a Catholic family. During his military service, he attained the rank of first lieutenant. In 1938, he became inspector at the Heerlen communal police, chief of the uniformed motorcycle division, as well as volunteer fireman.

== Resistance and Death ==
His military connections led him to become a member of the KP-Heerlen resistance movement, as well as commander of the Ordedienst-Heerlen, an illegal organization active in sabotage. He eventually became the leader of the Bongaerts-group, maintaining close relations with other resistance movements in South Limburg. In the capacity of this role, he was active in pilot aid, helping prisoners of war escape, often using firetrucks, as well as in plotting and committing various acts of sabotage, including the provision of explosives to militant resistance groups, which was enabled by his connections with the mining industry of the region. Additionally, the group distributed newspapers banned by the Nazis, helped persecuted groups go into hiding, and used his position as a fireman to hide weapons and forbidden documents in firetrucks so that they could be smuggled across the Nazi-occupied territories. The historian Cammaert notes: "The Bongaerts-group engaged in a wide range of resistance activities. They did what had to be done."

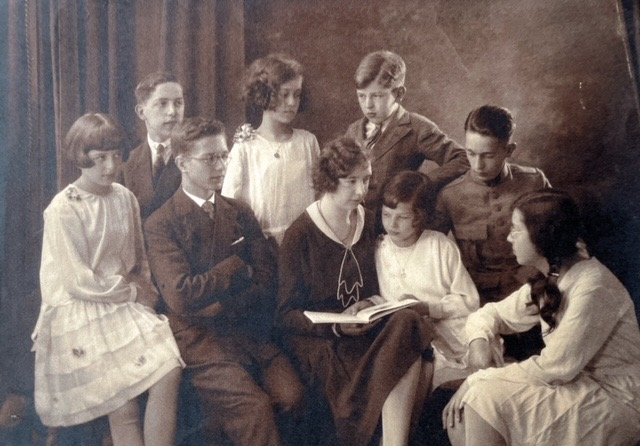
Charles Bongaerts and his siblings.

On 6 November 1943, he was betrayed to the Nazis, presumably by an NSB-member, arrested by the Gestapo, and deported. He was first incarcerated at Kamp Vught, followed by the camps in Haaren and Sandbostel before ending up in the Ladelund concentration camp, a satellite camp of Neuengamme, where he died on 23 November 1944, aged 35. The wave of arrests in November 1943 that he fell victim to brought an end to the activities of the Bongaerts-group.

== Awards and honors ==
He was posthumously awarded the US Medal of Freedom on 18 January 1947 by US President Harry S. Truman, as well as the Dutch Resistance Memorial Cross and the King's Commendation for Bravery of the United Kingdom. In Heerlen, the Bongaertslaan is named after him. In June 2025, Lodewijk Ivo Crijns published his biography, entitled Heldhaftig strijder tegen de nazi’s: Charles Bongaerts (Venlo 1909-Ladelund 1944), verzetsman en politie-inspecteur; een leven van moed en opoffering (Heroic fighter against the Nazis: Charles Bongaerts (Venlo 1909-Ladelund 1944), resistance fighter and police inspector; a life of courage and sacrifice), available in Dutch and published by Walburg Pers.

== Personal life ==
Bongaerts married Marie-Thérèse "Tita" Dahmen in 1940, with whom he had two sons, Charles and George.
