= Ladelund =

- Municipality
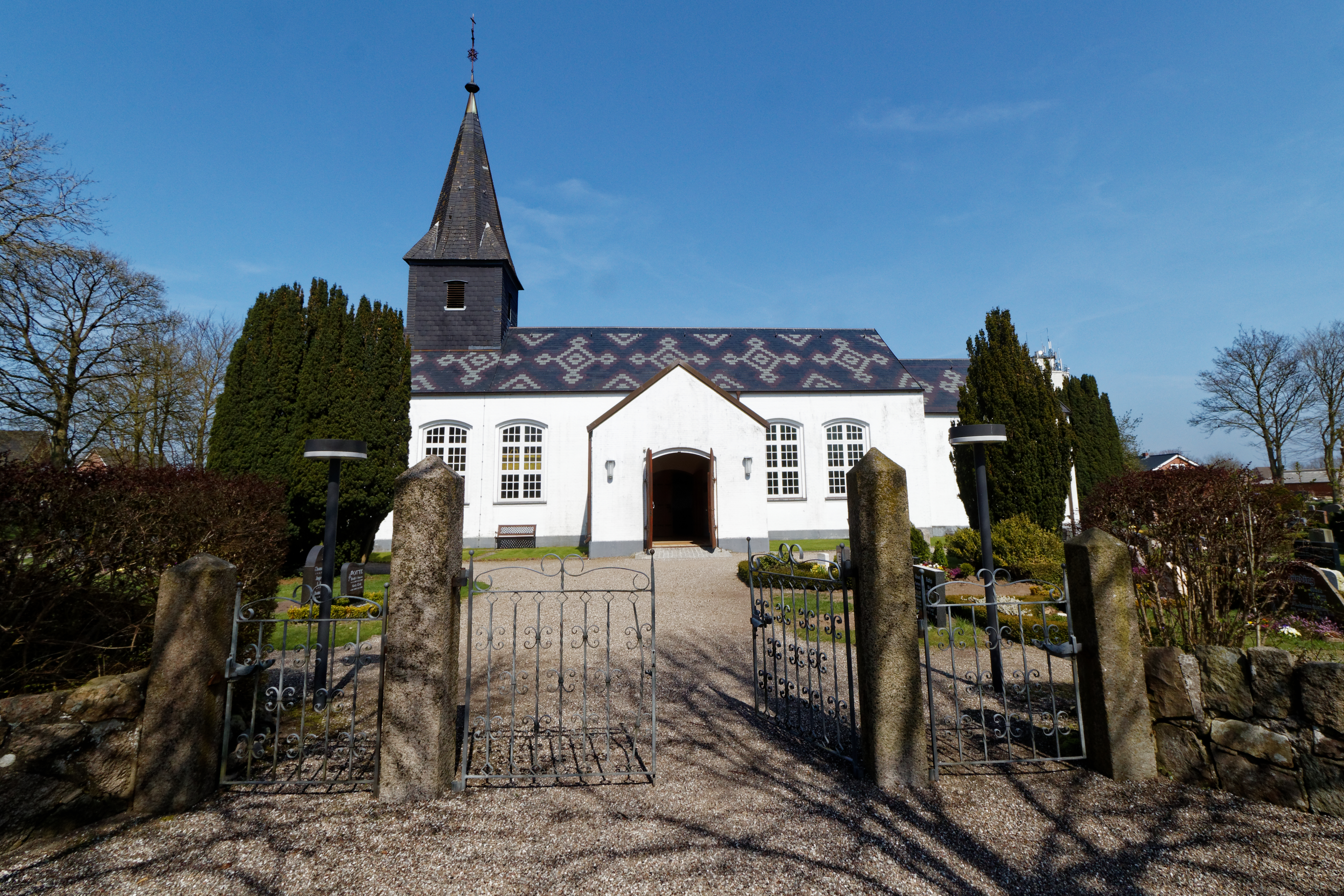

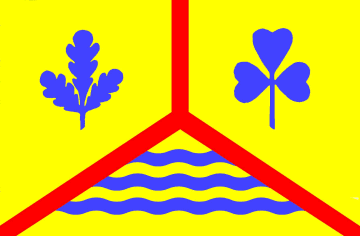
- Flag Coat of arms

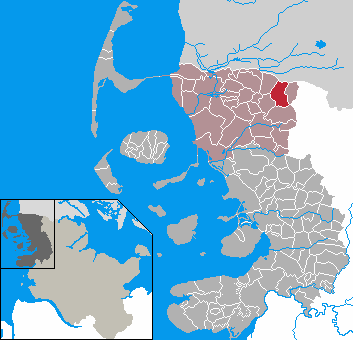
- Location of Ladelund within Nordfriesland district
- Interactive map of Ladelund
- Location within Germany Location within Schleswig-Holstein
- Coordinates: 54°50′31″N 9°1′35″E
- Country: Germany
- State: Schleswig-Holstein
- District: Nordfriesland
- Municipal assoc.: Südtondern

Government
  - Mayor: Lutz Martensen

Area
  - Total: 24.09 km^{2} (9.30 sq mi)
- Elevation: 20 m (66 ft)

Population (2025-12-31)
  - Total: 1,425
  - Density: 59.15/km^{2} (153.2/sq mi)
- Time zone: UTC+01:00 (CET)
  - Summer (DST): UTC+02:00 (CEST)
- Postal codes: 25926
- Dialling codes: 04666
- Vehicle registration: NF
- Website: www.ladelund.de

Ladelund is a municipality in the district of Nordfriesland, in Schleswig-Holstein, in northern Germany.

== History ==
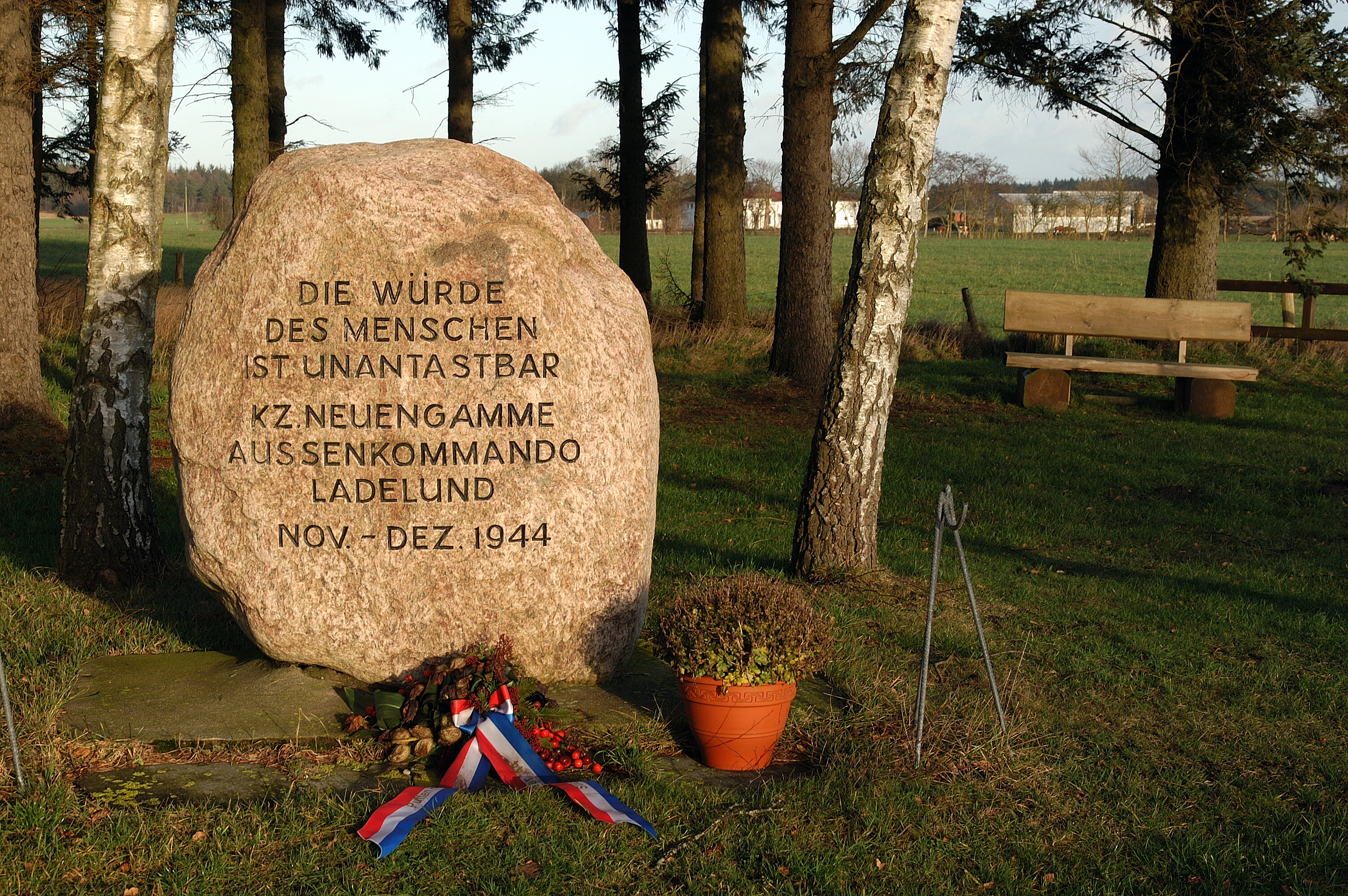
Memorial at the former Ladelund concentration camp

From November 1, 1944 until December 16, 1944, a concentration camp was established near Ladelund. The prisoners were mostly Dutch, Polish, Soviet, French, Italian, Belgian and Czechoslovak. In the six weeks of being in production 301 people died through hard labour, starvation and infection diseases. Among the deaths were also 111 Puttenaren, men from the village Putten in the Netherlands, who got deported during the Putten raid because the action was undertaken as a reprisal for a Dutch resistance attack on a vehicle carrying personnel from the Wehrmacht. It was one of the worst raids in occupied Netherlands during the Second World War. Ladelund was a subcamp to the Neuengamme concentration camp.

== See also ==
- List of subcamps of Neuengamme
