= Province of Schleswig-Holstein =

Province of Prussia (1867–1946)

Coordinates: 54.5°N 9.4°E

Province of Schleswig-Holstein Provinz Schleswig-Holstein (German)
- Province of Prussia
- 1867–1946
- Flag Coat of arms

- The Province of Schleswig-Holstein (red), within the Kingdom of Prussia, within the German Empire
- Capital: Kiel (1866–1879, 1917–1946); Schleswig (1879–1917)
- Area
  - 1914: 19,004 km^{2} (7,337 sq mi)
  - 1939: 15,682 km^{2} (6,055 sq mi)
- Population
  - 1914: 1,504,339
  - 1939: 1,598,328
- History
  - Established: 1867
  - North Schleswig ceded to Denmark: 15 June 1920
  - Greater Hamburg Act: 1 April 1937
  - Disestablished: 1946
Preceded by
Duchy of Schleswig
Duchy of Holstein
Saxe-Lauenburg
Free and Hanseatic City of Lübeck
Prince-Bishopric of Lübeck
Succeeded by
Schleswig-Holstein
Aabenraa County
Altona, Hamburg
Haderslev County
Sønderborg County
Tønder County
Wandsbek
State of Mecklenburg
- Today part of: Germany; Denmark

The Province of Schleswig-Holstein (German: Provinz Schleswig-Holstein [ˌʃleːsvɪç ˈhɔlʃtaɪn]) was a province of the Kingdom of Prussia (from 1868 to 1918) and the Free State of Prussia (from 1918 to 1946). It stretches from Denmark, to around the lower course of the Elbe river and the state of Hamburg.

== History ==
It was created from the Duchies of Schleswig and Holstein, which had been conquered by Prussia and the Austrian Empire from Denmark in the Second War of Schleswig in 1864. Following the Austro-Prussian War of 1866, which ended in Austrian defeat, Schleswig and Holstein were annexed by decree of Prussian King Wilhelm I on 12 January 1867. The province was created in 1868, and it incorporated the Duchy of Lauenburg from 1876 onward.

Following the defeat of Imperial Germany in World War I, the Allied powers organised two plebiscites in northern and central Schleswig on 10 February and 14 March 1920, respectively. In northern Schleswig, 75% voted for reunification with Denmark and 25% for staying with Germany. In central Schleswig, the situation was reversed, with 80% voting for Germany and 20% for Denmark. No vote ever took place in the southern third of Schleswig, as it was considered a foregone conclusion that almost all the inhabitants would vote to remain in Germany.

On 15 June 1920, northern Schleswig was officially reunited with Denmark (see: South Jutland County). The remainder of Schleswig remained part of Schleswig-Holstein, now a province of the Free State of Prussia.

With the Greater Hamburg Act of 1937, the Hanseatic City of Lübeck and the Oldenburgian exclave Region of Lübeck were incorporated into the Schleswig-Holstein province. A number of municipalities belonging to Schleswig-Holstein adjacent to the Hanseatic City of Hamburg, among them Altona and Wandsbek, were incorporated into the city and, in return, Hamburg ceded its exclaves of Geesthacht and Großhansdorf to Schleswig-Holstein.

After World War II, Schleswig-Holstein was part of the British occupation zone, although some municipalities of Schleswig-Holstein east of Ratzeburg were exchanged for municipalities of Mecklenburg in the Soviet occupation zone (Barber Lyashchenko Agreement). The British-occupied section became the new German state of Schleswig-Holstein on 23 August 1946, which joined the Federal Republic of Germany on 23 May 1949.

The Province of Schleswig-Holstein (red), within the Free State of Prussia, within the Weimar Republic, following the cession of North Schleswig to Denmark in 1920

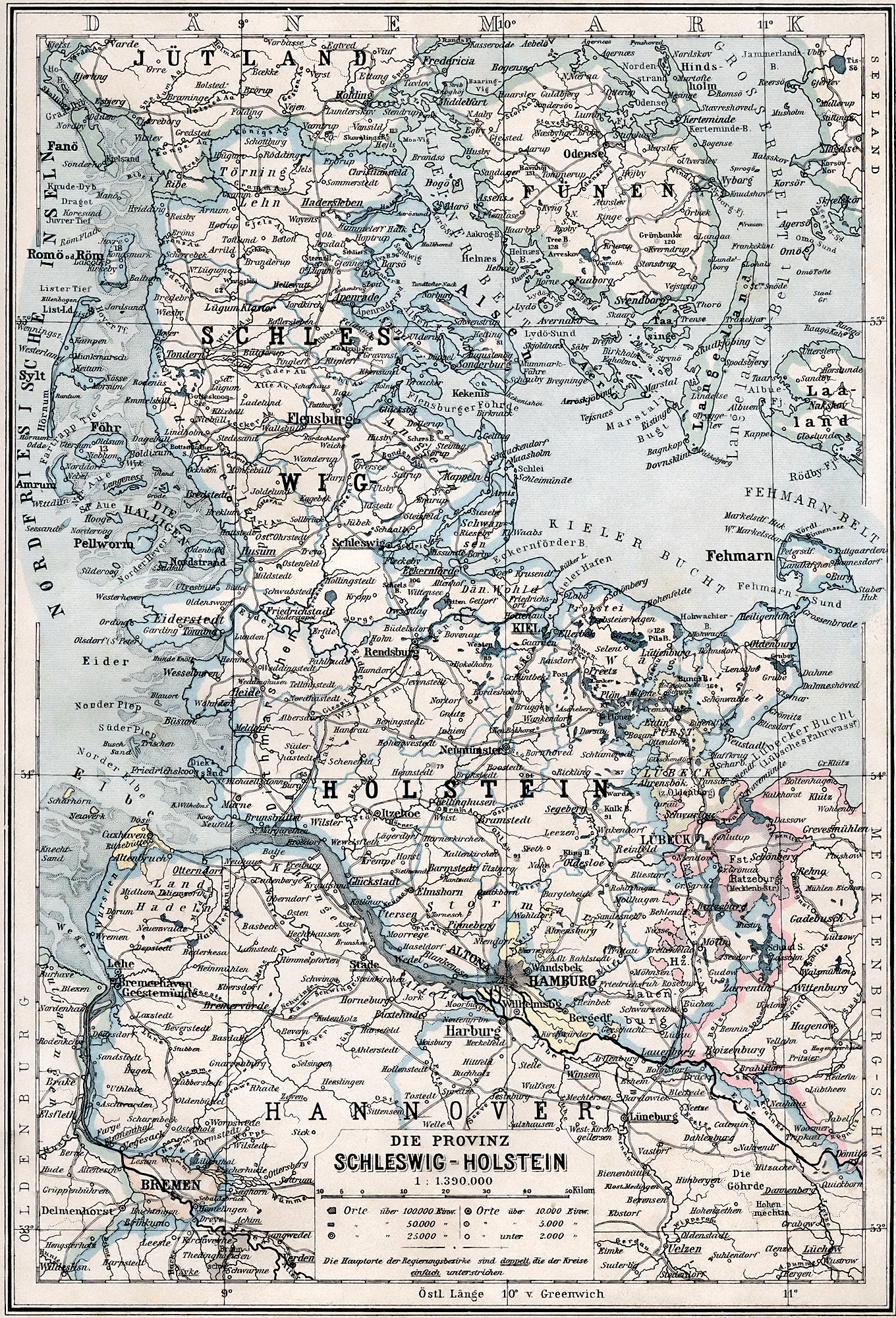
Map of the Province of Schleswig-Holstein, as of 1905

== See also ==
- Schleswig-Holstein
- Schleswig-Holstein Question
- History of Schleswig-Holstein
- Peace of Prague (1866)
- Persecution of the Jews in Schleswig-Holstein (1933–1945)
- Schleswig Plebiscites
