= Putten raid =

1944 civilian raid in Germany

Coordinates: 52.25°N 5.53°E

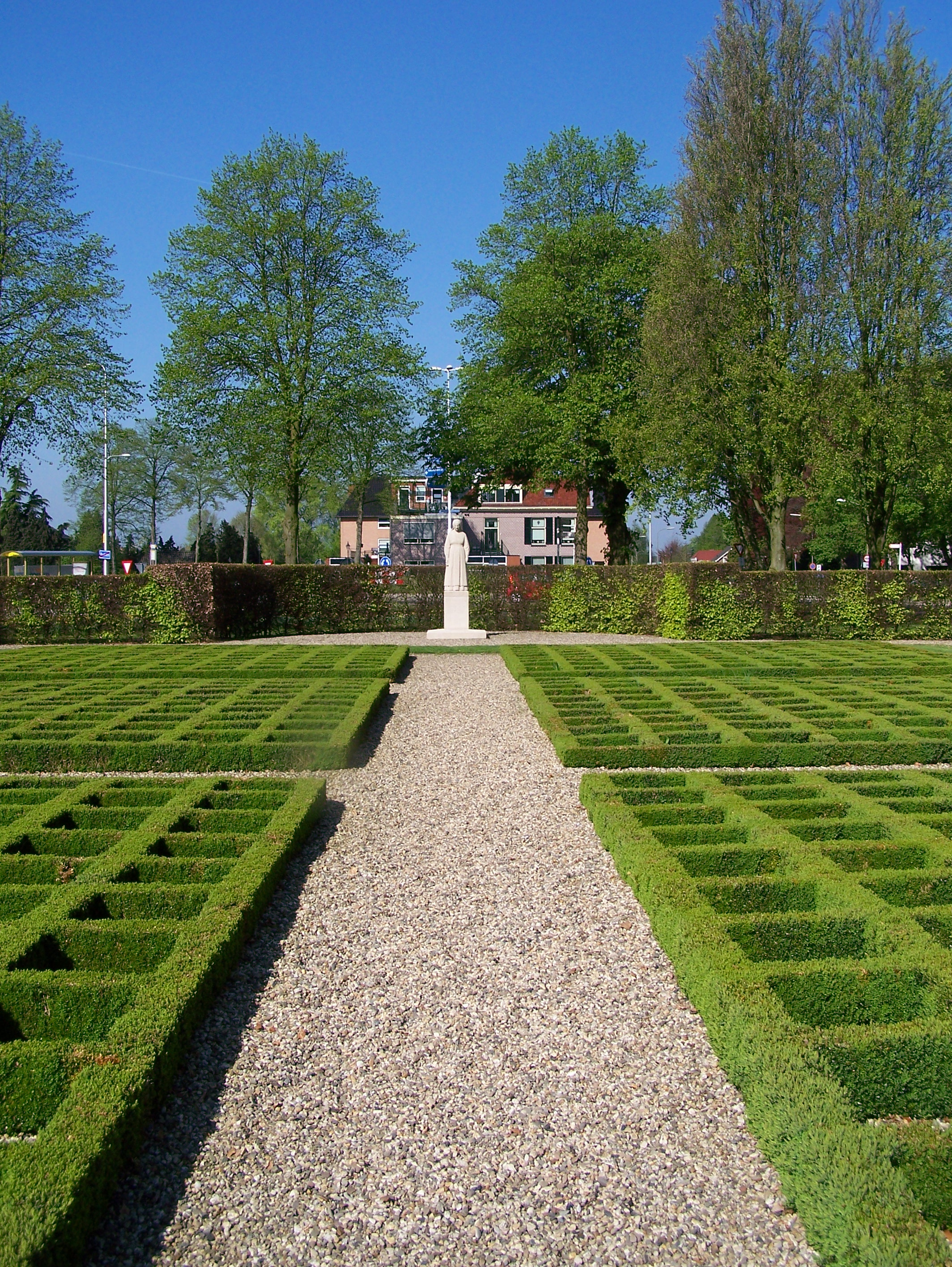
Lady of Putten in the memorial garden (Vrouwtje van Putten Herdenkingshof)

The Putten raid (Dutch: Razzia van Putten) was a civilian raid conducted by Nazi Germany in occupied Netherlands during the Second World War. On 1 October 1944, a total of 602 men – almost the entire male population of the village – were taken from Putten, in the central Netherlands, and deported to various concentration camps inside Germany. Only 48 returned at the end of the war. The raid was carried out as a reprisal for a Dutch resistance attack on a vehicle carrying personnel from the Wehrmacht.

== Background ==
On the night of 30 September-1 October 1944, a car carrying two officers and two corporals of the German Army was ambushed by members of the Dutch resistance near the Oldenallerbrug bridge between Putten and Nijkerk. In the attack, a resistance fighter named Frans Slotboom was wounded; he later died. One German officer, Lieutenant Otto Sommer, was also injured, and escaped to a nearby farmhouse to raise the alarm; he died the following day. The two German corporals fled while the second officer, Oberleutnant Eggart, was injured and captured. Due to his wounds, the resistance fighters abandoned him in a place where he could be found by the Germans.

== German reprisal ==
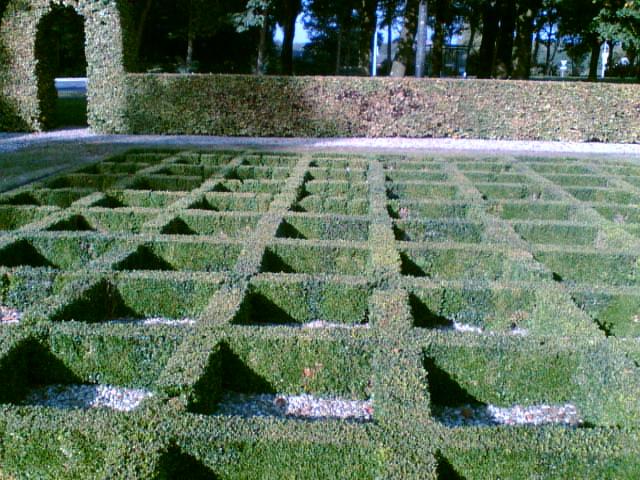
660 symbolic graves in the Putten memorial garden

The German reprisal raid was conducted the following day. At the command of General Friedrich Christiansen, Putten was surrounded by German forces. The women and men of the village were captured and separated, and over 100 houses in the village were set on fire. Six men and a woman were shot dead during the raid. The women were held at the church until 9 pm, while the men and boys were detained separately nearby at the village school. On 2 October, 661 men between the ages of 18 and 50 were taken to Amersfoort concentration camp, where 59 older or unfit men were released. The remaining 602 men left Amersfoort on 11 October and taken to Neuengamme concentration camp as forced labour. During the transportation, 13 men escaped by jumping off the train. From Neuengamme, some were moved to other camps or sub-camps, including Ladelund, Bergen-Belsen, Meppen-Versen, Beendorf, Wöbbelin and Malchow.

Only 48 men returned after the end of the war, but another 5 died, due to their mistreatment in the camps, after they arrived home. Some people returned crippled, as they had been kept in small cages they could not stand in. As further reprisals, the SS set fire to 105 houses. A total of 552 men and 1 woman died, mostly victims of malnutrition, slave labour, and infectious diseases.

== Memorials ==
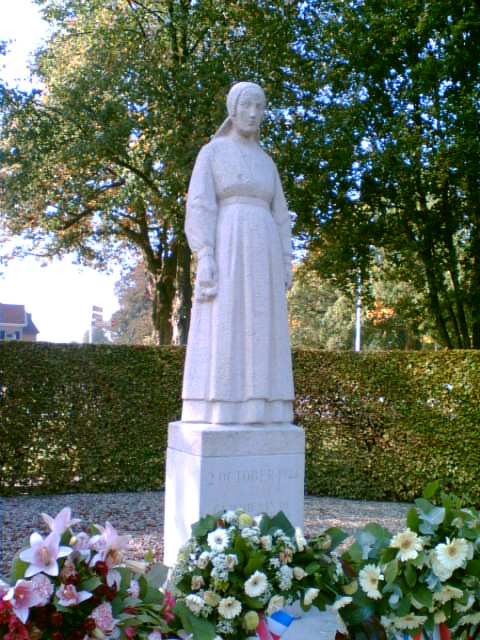
Lady of Putten memorial

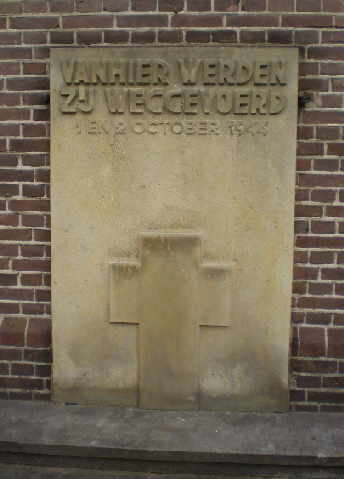
Commemorative stone at the Oude Kerk in Putten

A monument commemorating the victims of the raid was unveiled by Queen Juliana on 1 October 1949. The monument includes a memorial park designed by Jan Bijhouwer, and a sandstone statue called "treurende weduwe" (mourning widow) by Mari Andriessen depicting a grieving woman in traditional dress with a handkerchief in her hand, better known as "het Vrouwtje van Putten" (The little Lady of Putten). The statue looks toward the Oude Kerk (Old Church) in Putten, from where the men were deported.

A silent memorial is held at the monument on 2 October each year, attended by hundreds of people. Wreaths are laid by the College van burgemeester en wethouders (The College of the Mayor and Municipal Executives), the "Stichting oktober '44" (The October '44 Foundation), surviving returnees (the last one died in 2013), schoolchildren from Putten and other organizations from the Netherlands and abroad. No speeches are made, but a music group plays appropriate music and a choir sings verses of Psalm 84, as the Putten men did when they were taken away.

== See also ==
- Ascq massacre
- Lidice (Assassination of Reinhard Heydrich)
- Oradour-sur-Glane massacre
- Telavåg (Telavåg Tragedy)
- Wola massacre
