= Husum-Schwesing concentration camp =

Satellite of Neuengamme concentration camp

Coordinates: 54°30′35.8″N 9°07′05.2″E

The Husum-Schwesing subcamp (German: KZ-Außenlager Husum-Schwesing) in the Schwesing district of Engelsburg, about five kilometres northeast of Husum, became a satellite of Neuengamme concentration camp on 26 September 1944 and was occupied by prisoners in connection with the construction of the so-called Frisian Wall (Friesenwall). Some 2,500 people from 14 countries were incarcerated here in autumn 1944; 297 prisoners died as a result of forced labour, malnutrition and abuse. The camp was closed on 29 December 1944.

== Location ==
The camp was sited a few kilometres northeast of Husum in the county of Nordfriesland between the main road from Husum to Flensburg (today the B 200) and the now disused railway line to Flensburg. The local name for this area was Engelsburg, which is why the name KZ Engelsburg is sometimes used.

== Use as a construction work camp ==
In 1938/39 the Husum-Schwesing Airfield was laid out. A camp for the 231st Construction Battalion was built for the workers near the village of Schwesing. The camp's capacity was set at 250 men. The Luftwaffe stationed in Husum during the Second World War, however, only stationed aircraft dummies there to mislead Allied bomber units flying in from the North Sea. After the construction troops withdrew, the camp temporarily served as a collection point for soldiers of the Wehrmacht returning from leave bound for their units in Scandinavia. A temporary vacancy followed.

== Concentration sub-camp ==
=== Construction ===
In September 1944, the villagers of Husum were ordered to Schwesing to erect a double barbed wire fence around the camp and erect high watchtowers at the four corners.

The camp consisted of nine barracks, eight of which were used as prisoners' quarters and one as an infirmary. In addition, there were two larger buildings on the 3,000 m^{2} (32,000 sq ft) site that housed the camp cookhouse, armoury, a tailor's and cobbler's, as well as four temporary latrines.

=== Inmates ===
On 25 September, around 1,500 prisoners from Neuengamme concentration camp were transported to Husum-Schwesing in cattle wagons of the German Reichsbahn. On 20 October, another 1,000 prisoners from Neuengamme followed. Most of the prisoners were of Dutch, French, Danish and Polish nationality. Other prisoners came from countries like the Soviet Union and Germany. The camp elder was Reichsdeutsche political prisoner, Heinrich Neufeldt.

=== Everyday camp life ===
Using only shovels and spades the prisoners had to dig a four to five metre wide and three metre deep anti-tank trench and construct battle positions and shelters in the heavy marshland. Sometimes they stood in cold water and mud all day long. In the process, they were exposed to the beatings of the kapos, who were supposed to force people to work, but often terrorized at random. Older marines “unfit for field service” guarded the prisoners at work and during the often kilometre-long march to get there.

The operation of the camp took place in view of the local population: on the way to the Atlantic Wall site, the prisoners were driven through the streets of Husum in the morning and in the evening. Husum residents had to transport their bodies to the cemetery in their cart. There are also local reports of seeing the prisoners through the camp fence and at work.

In December 1944, the Friesenwall had become completely pointless due to the changing military situation. The camp in Husum-Schwesing was closed and the surviving prisoners returned to Neuengamme.

=== Camp command ===
Hans Hermann Griem

From September 1944, the Husum-Schwesing sub-camp was headed by SS-Untersturmführer, Hans Hermann Griem, who in November 1944 also took over the management of the Ladelund sub-camp. He constantly withheld food, enjoyed sadistic torture, shot several prisoners himself and was often drunk. After the camps were dissolved, Griem commanded the Dalum subcamp (Emslandlager Dalum).

=== After 1945 ===
After the end of the war, most of the dead were returned to their homeland. For a time, the site served as a refugee camp.

It was not until 1963 that the Public Prosecutor of Flensburg reopened the investigation against Griem, but did not make any progress. In 1965, the whereabouts of Griem could be determined. He had settled in Hamburg-Bergedorf. Thereupon the case was handed over to the Hamburg public prosecutor in 1966. This began with systematic investigations aimed at a lawsuit against Griem. On 16 January 1969, the Hamburg State Court opened preliminary judicial investigations against Griem. Shortly before the actual trial began, Griem died on 25 June 1971.

== Concentration camp memorial ==
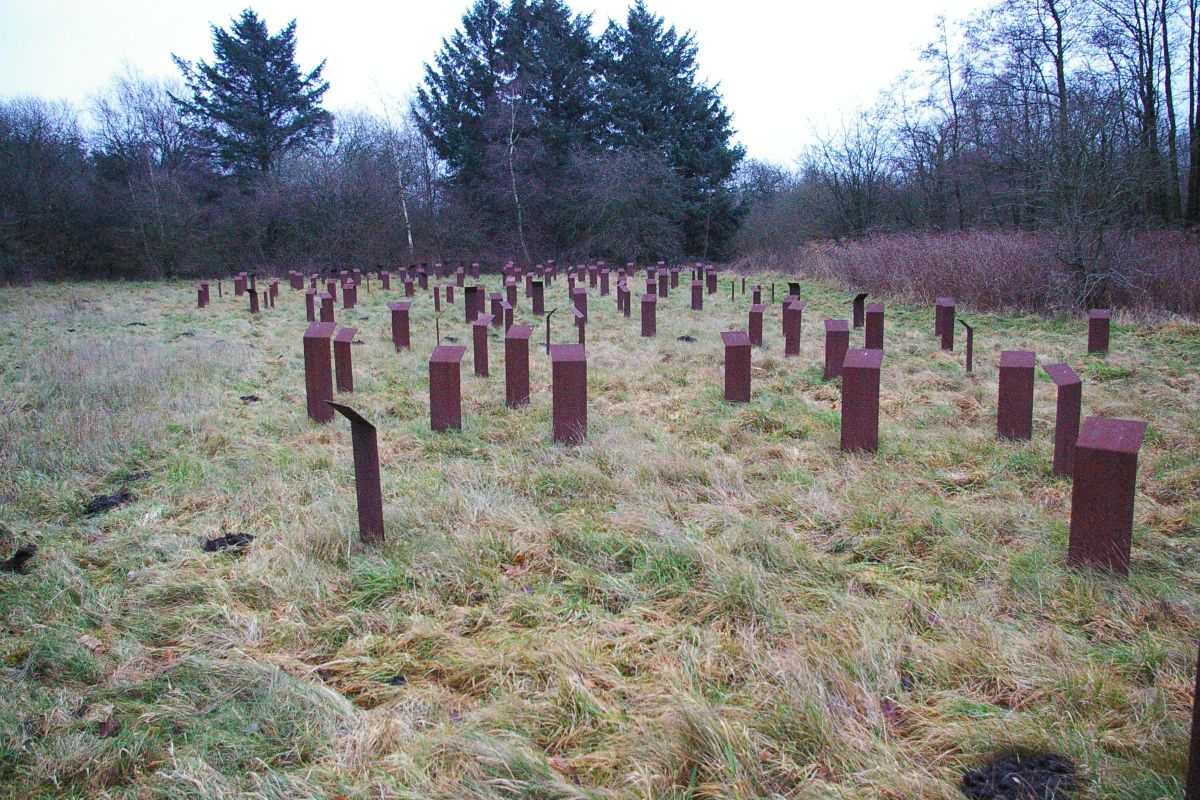
Site of the former camp with 300 iron steles

In 1983, the Husum-Schwesing concentration camp working group published the history of the camp and on 30 January 1983, a memorial event was attended by around a thousand people in Husum, at which former prisoners recounted their suffering in the camp. In 1985, the county of Nordfriesland was able to buy the eastern half of the former concentration camp site and, in 1994, further parts of the site, on which the remains of the foundations and the hydrant are located. A memorial designed by sculptor, Ulrich Lindow, was inaugurated on the camp grounds as early as November 1987. The site has been a listed building since 1995. A multilingual information board with information about the history of the camp was set up in 1998 next to the visitor car park. Since 2001/2002, 300 steles have been installed to commemorate those killed in the camp. The steles symbolize stooped people in humble posture and their scattered distribution recalls the arbitrary violence against the prisoners. They are made of steel that rusts quickly, so that the names of the deceased are difficult to decipher - as an indication that the memory of the time and the crimes of National Socialism is difficult to maintain.

In 2017 the “House of the Present” was built. In addition, the old information board was replaced by new, more detailed boards and a camp tour was set up with the help of an audio guide.

=== Friends of the site ===
In 2014 the "Friends of the Husum-Schwesing Concentration Camp Memorial Site" was founded. It is committed to reviewing the memorial and implementing plans for appropriate changes to be implemented. Further tasks are the promotion of research and communication of the history of the Husum-Schwesing concentration camp in the context of the historical development of the 20th century.

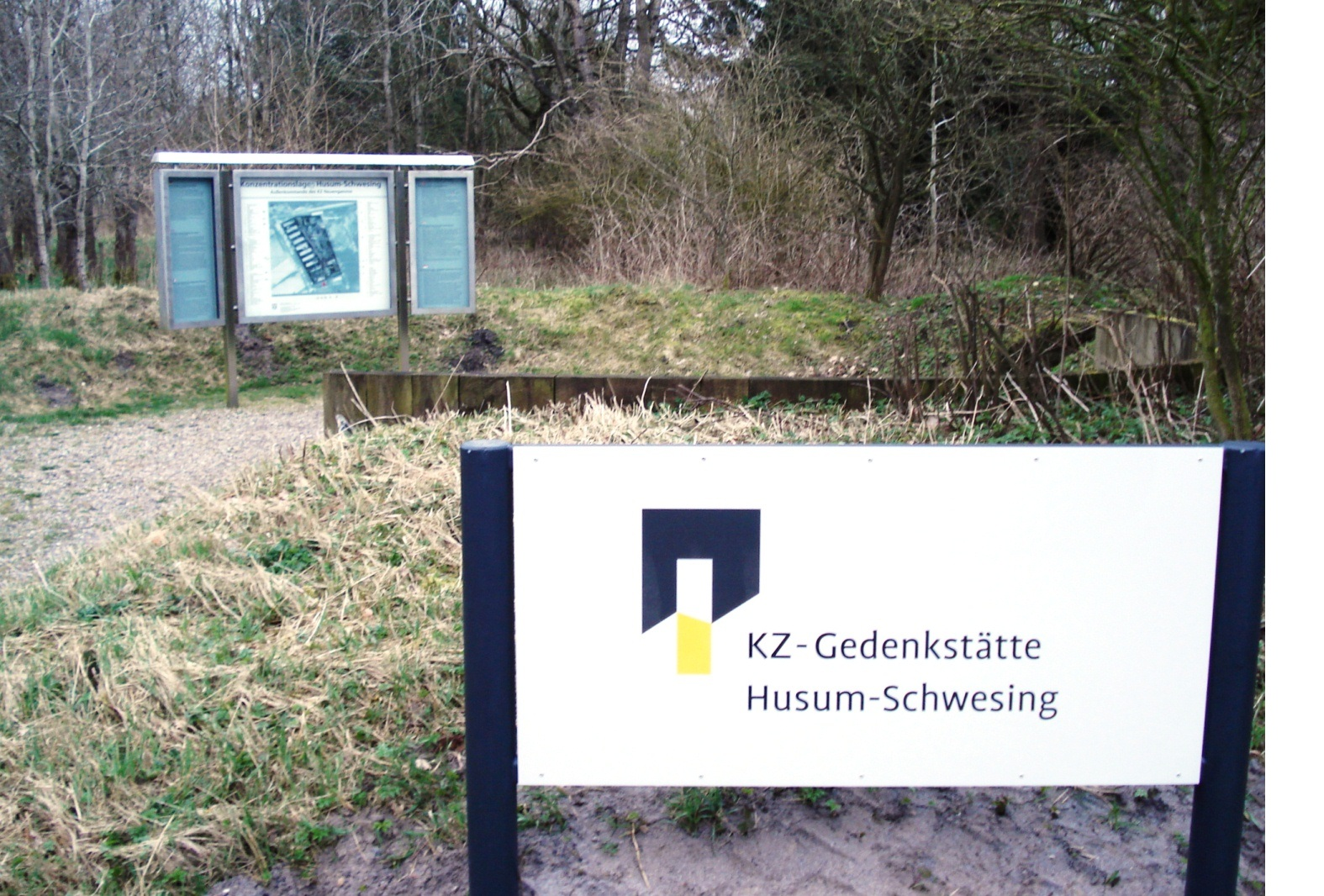
Entrance area of the memorial site of Husum-Schwesing sub-camp (to 2017)

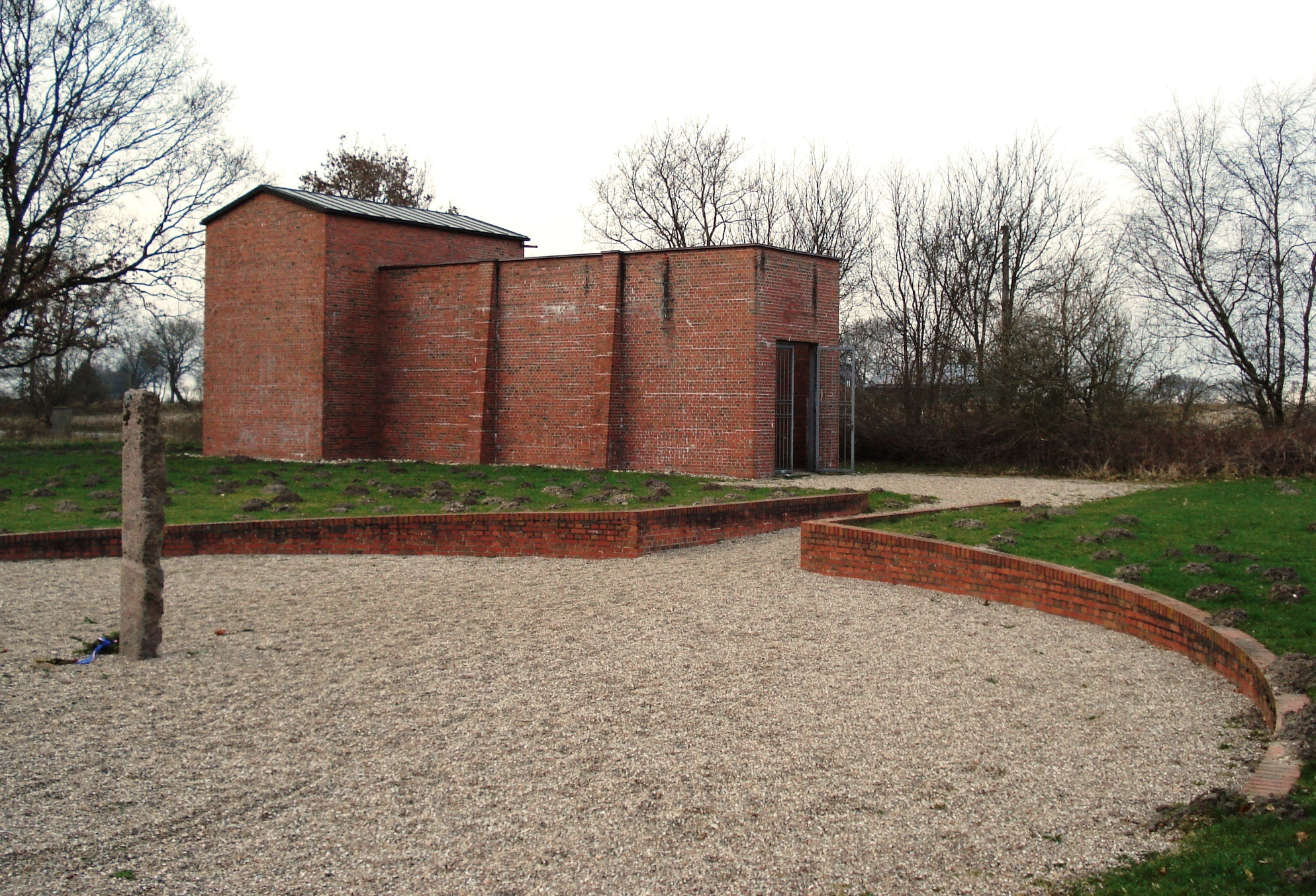
Museum building at the memorial site of Husum-Schwesing concentration camp

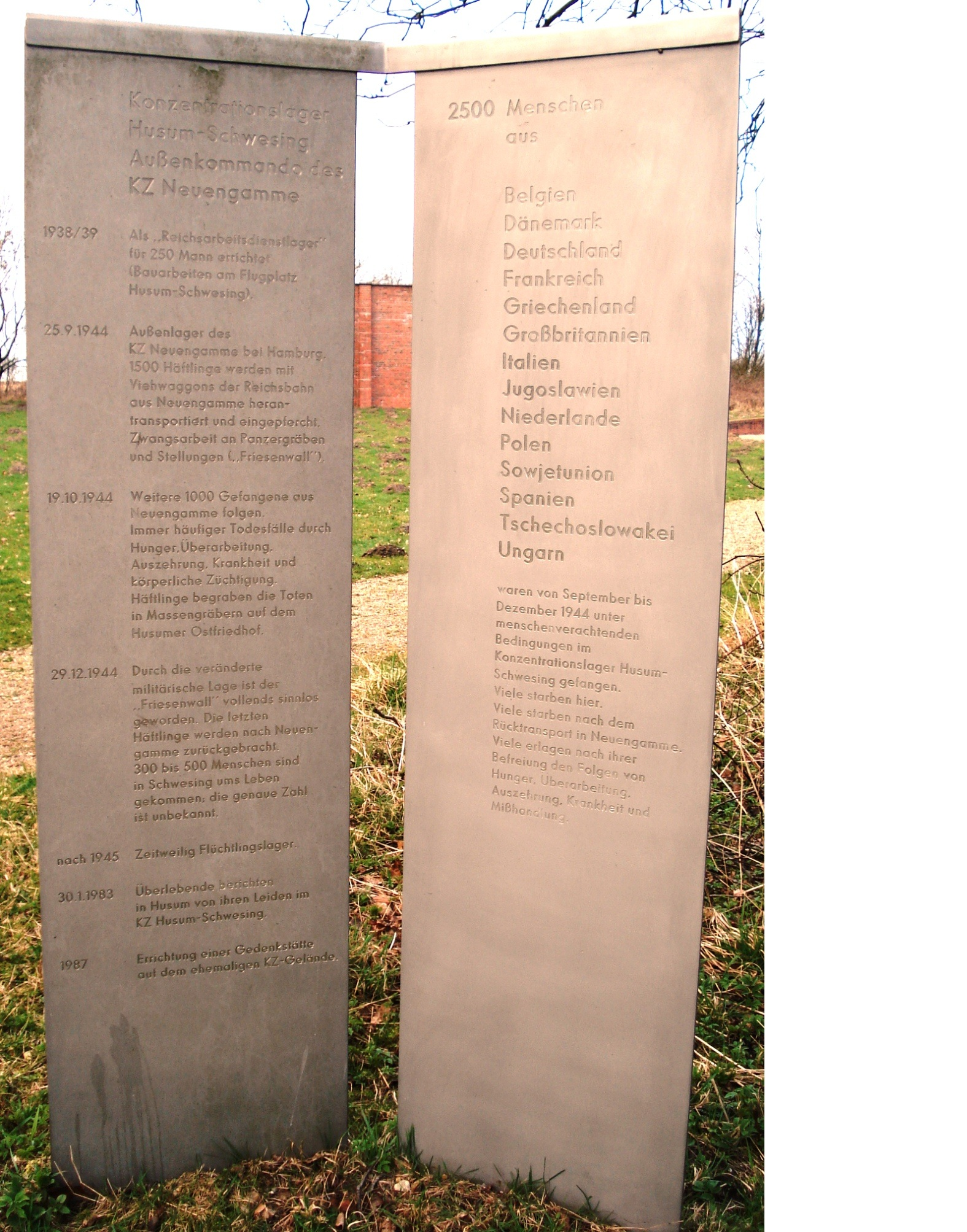
Information board at the memorial site building (to 2017)

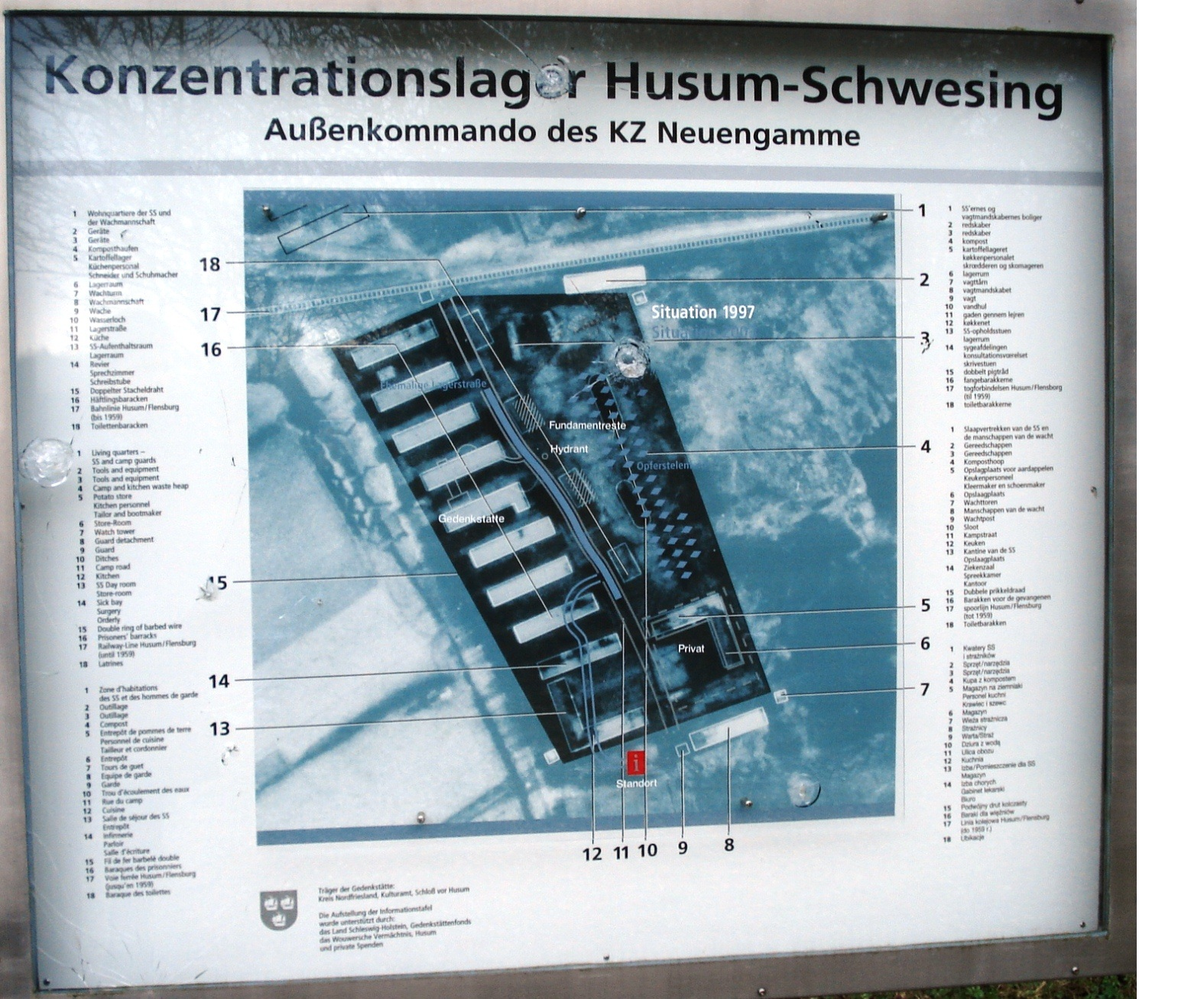
Information board – overview map (to 2017)

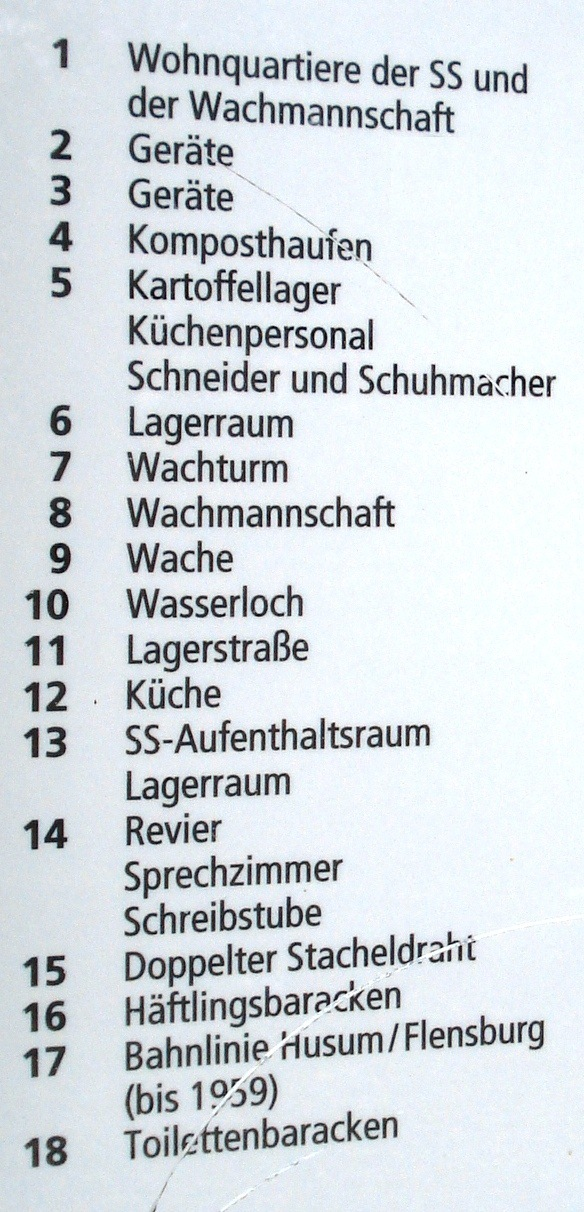
Information board – description of the map (to 2017)

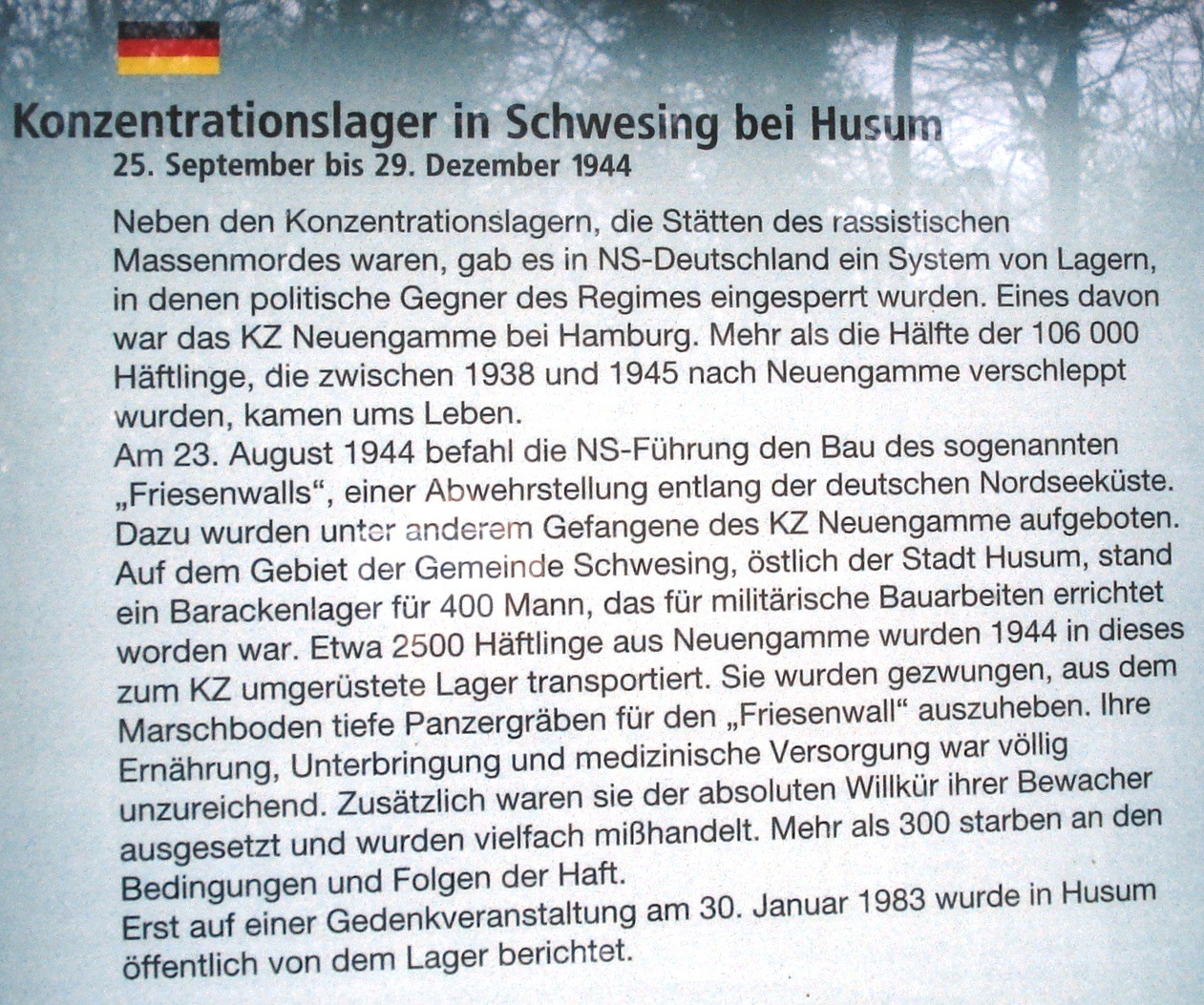
Information board – information text (to 2017)

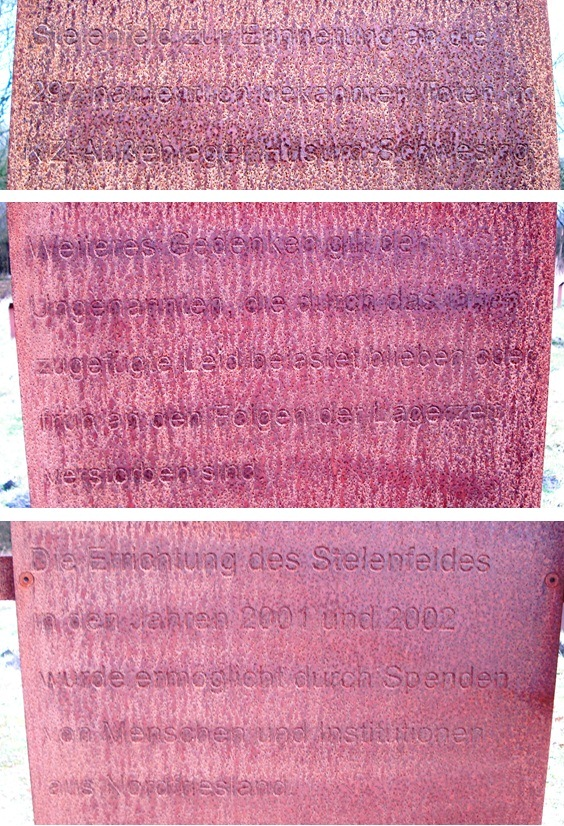
Information from the steles (extracts of text)

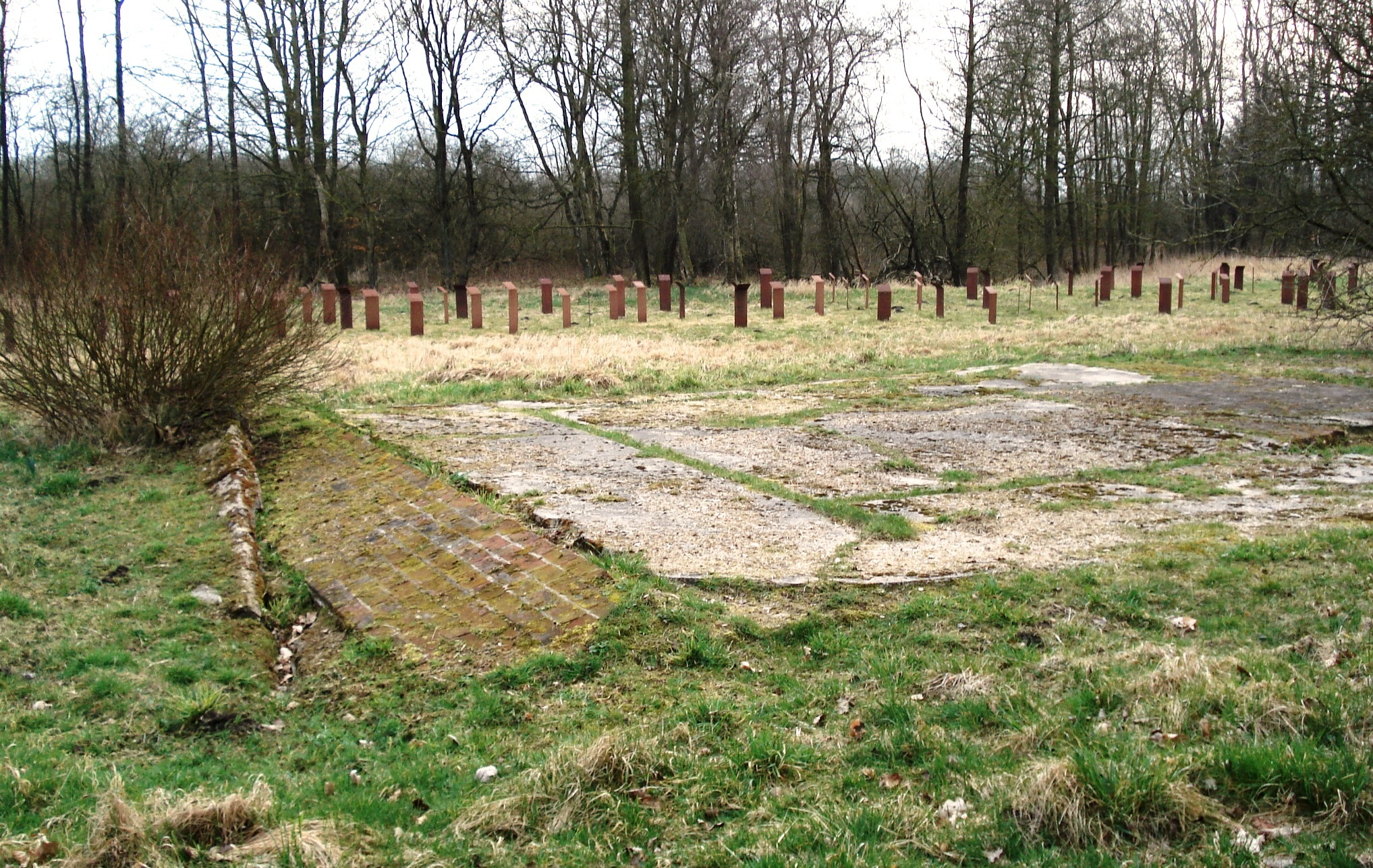
Foundations of the Husum-Schwesing sub-camp (with steles in the background)

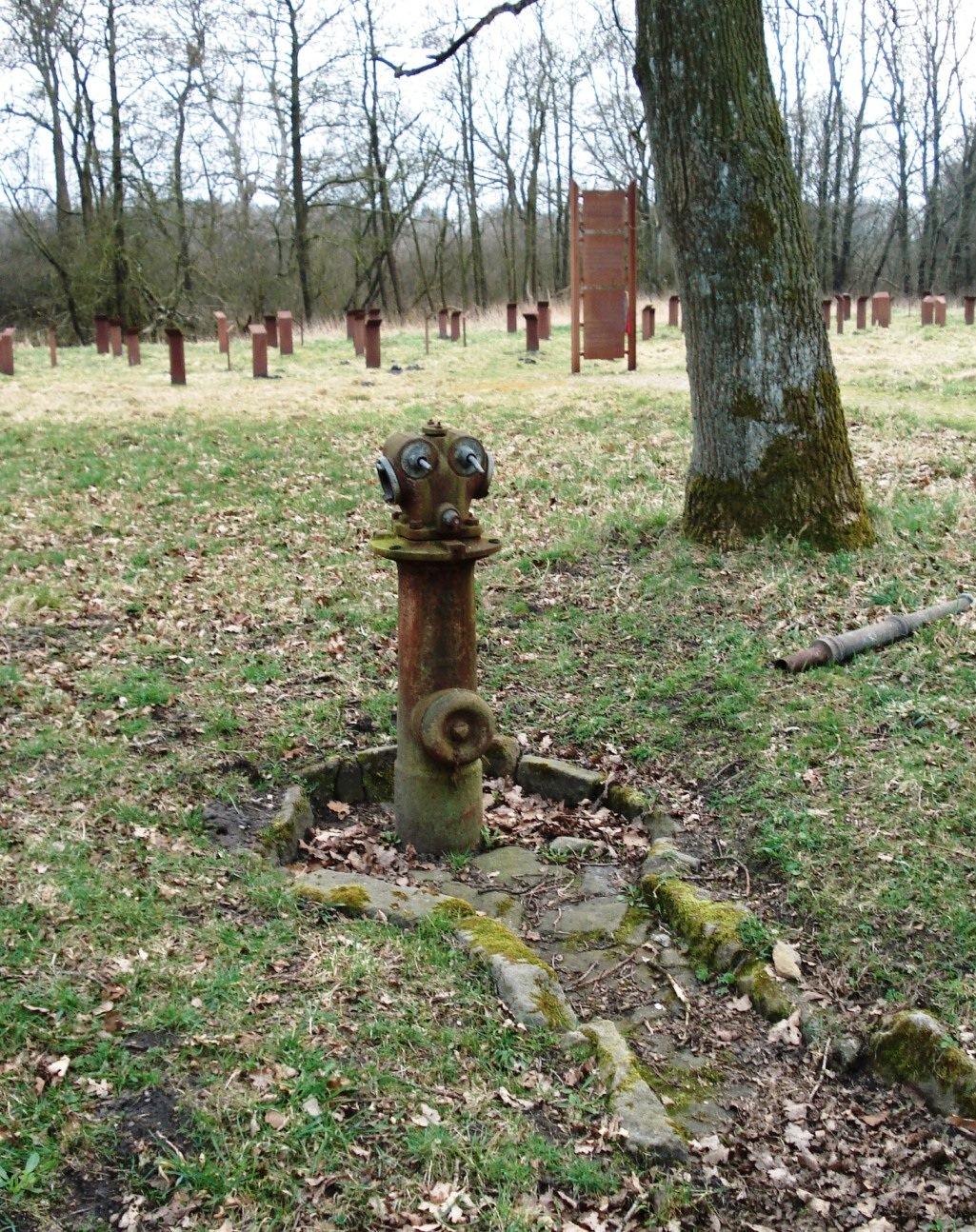
Hydrant from the former Husum-Schwesing sub-camp (with steles in the background)

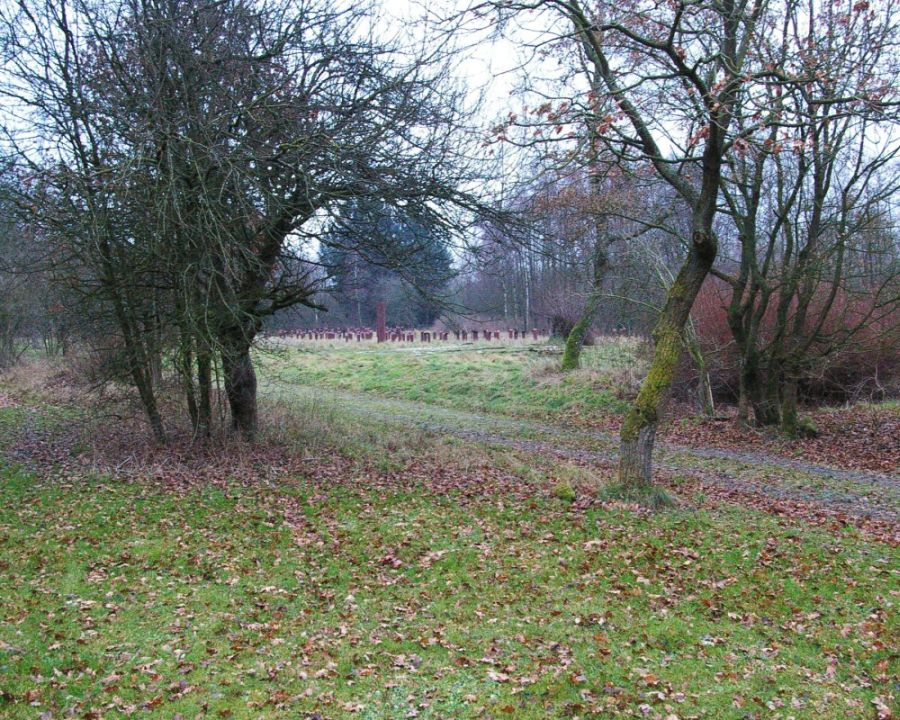
Terrain of the former Husum-Schwesing sub-camp

== Literature ==
- Klaus Bästlein et al. (ed.): Das KZ Husum-Schwesing, Aussenkommando des Konzentrationslagers Neuengamme. 30. Januar – 50 Jahre „Machtergreifung“. Materialien zu einem dunklen Kapitel nordfriesischer Geschichte (= Nordfriisk Instituut. Nr. 73). Nordfriisk Instituut, Bredstedt/Bräist 1983, ISBN 3-88007-118-7.
- Wolfgang Benz, Barbara Distel (eds.): Der Ort des Terrors. Geschichte der nationalsozialistischen Konzentrationslager. Vol. 5: Hinzert, Auschwitz, Neuengamme. C.H. Beck, München 2007, ISBN 978-3-406-52965-8.
- Fiete Pingel und Thomas Steensen: Die KZ-Außenlager Husum-Schwesing und Ladelund. In: Uwe Danker, Nils Köhler, Eva Nowottny, Michael Ruck (ed.): Zwangsarbeitende im Kreis Nordfriesland 1939–1945 (= IZRG-Schriftenreihe. Bd. 12). Verlag für Regionalgeschichte, Bielefeld 2004, pp. 271–293, ISBN 3-89534-552-0.
- Olde Lorenzen: „Macht ohne Moral“. Vom KZ Husum-Schwesing zum Mahnmal für die Opfer. Westholsteinische Verlags-Anstalt Boyens, Heide 1994, ISBN 3-80420-685-9.
- Ulrike Puvogel, Martin Stankowski: Gedenkstätten für die Opfer des Nationalsozialismus. Eine Dokumentation. Band 1: Baden-Württemberg, Bayern, Bremen, Hamburg, Hessen, Niedersachsen, Nordrhein-Westfalen, Rheinland-Pfalz, Saarland, Schleswig-Holstein. 2nd revised and expanded edition. Bundeszentrale für Politische Bildung, Bonn 1995, ISBN 3-89331-208-0.
