= Ladelund concentration camp =

Subcamp of the Neuengamme concentration camp

Coordinates: 54.8481°N 9.0373°E

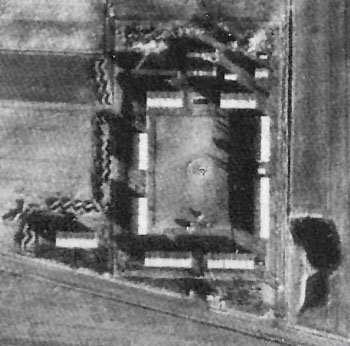
Aerial view of Ladelund subcamp

The Ladelund concentration camp, located 20 km north-east of Niebüll on the German-Danish border, was set up as a satellite camp of Neuengamme concentration camp on 1 November 1944 as part of the construction of the so-called Friesenwall. The Friesenwall was a planned but only partially completed fortification that was to be built on the German North Sea coast towards the end of World War II. The concentration camp near Ladelund was responsible for the construction of trenches and gun emplacements for a militarily pointless "blocking position" south of the Danish border. The camp was disbanded on 16 December 1944. Within the month and a half that it existed, 300 out of over 2,000 prisoners died.

== Location ==
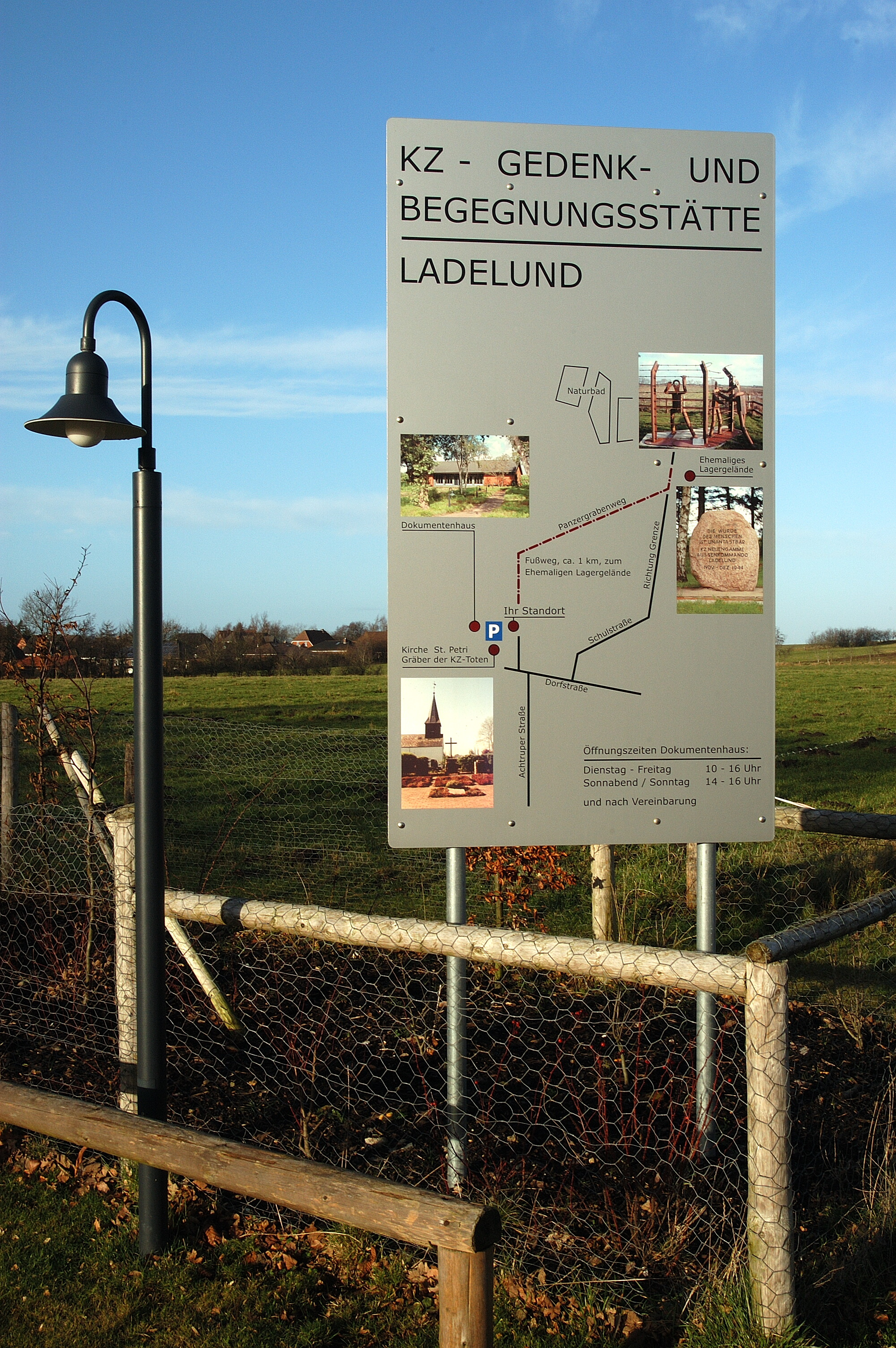
Layout of today's memorial site

The site, on which a labor camp of the Reich Labour Service (RAD) and later the subcamp was established in 1938, is located north-east of Ladelund in the former district of Südtondern (in today's district of Nordfriesland, Amt Südtondern) near the Danish border. About eight kilometers from the actual camp is the train station in Achtrup, where 2,000 prisoners from many European countries arrived in covered goods wagons. The prisoners had to walk from Achtrup to Ladelund. Ladelund was chosen as a subcamp because of its location, the existing RAD camp area and the good transport routes.

== Historical background ==
In 1938, the Reich Labour Service set up a barracks camp for 250 young men north-east of Ladelund. They built a 34-kilometer road parallel to the Danish border from Süderlügum to Flensburg; this was called the Betonstraße (concrete road) or Panzerstraße (tank road). They also worked on drainage measures, wasteland cultivation and reforestation. The Ladelund labor camp was not enclosed or guarded.

== Ladelund subcamp ==
On 28 August 1944 Hitler ordered the construction of the so-called Friesenwall on the North Sea coast. 16,000 prisoners of war were used for the construction, as well as 6,000 concentration camp prisoners, who were transferred from Neuengamme concentration camp to newly built subcamps in Engerhafe (2,000 prisoners) in Ostfriesland, Meppen-Versen (3,000 prisoners) and Dalum in Emsland (1,000 prisoners) and Schwesing (up to 2,500 prisoners) and Ladelund in Nordfriesland.

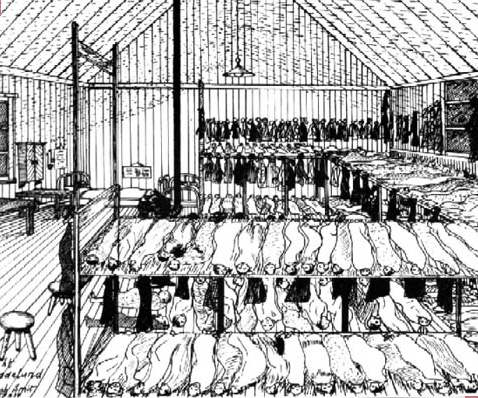
The inside of a barrack, drawn by a prisoner

In October 1944, the conversion of the labor camp into a satellite camp of Neuengamme concentration camp began. It was fenced in with barbed wire and given four watchtowers. On 1 November over 2,000 inmates from Neuengamme were sent to the camp. They arrived at Achtrup station in goods wagons. Most prisoners were classified as "political" according to the concentration camp system - except the Kapos - and came from all over Europe. They had been arrested as resistance fighters, hostages or forced laborers. The largest group came from the Netherlands; many came from the village of Putten. More than 600 Dutch men aged 17 and over were arrested in Putten on 1 October 1944, as part of a punitive action on behalf of the German Wehrmacht commander. The "Putten raid" was considered a reprisal action after resistance fighters had attacked a Wehrmacht off-road vehicle near the village. One occupant of the vehicle and one resistance fighter were killed.

On 2 December 1944 the prisoners were taken to the Amersfoort transit camp and from there to Neuengamme concentration camp. Of the 588, only 48 returned, the others perished in Neuengamme concentration camp or in other concentration camps, including Ladelund, where the first prisoners soon died as a result of the inhumane conditions.

Ladelund was originally set up as a Reich labour service camp for 200 to 250 men. After it was converted into a subcamp, over 2,000 prisoners were housed here in 50-meter-long and eight to ten-meter-wide unheated barracks. Between 80 and 120 prisoners were packed into a barrack room measuring just under 40 m^{2}. Only the "oldest person in the barracks" had his own bed; the "barracks servants" shared a bed. All the other prisoners slept on the floor or rough wooden frames close together, without straw sacks or mattresses, only on scattered straw. The sanitary facilities had not been upgraded in the course of the conversion to a subcamp and were still from the old labor camp. Like the kitchen, they were sufficient for a maximum of 250 people. The hygienic conditions in the camp were catastrophic; vermin and diseases spread. Despite the adverse weather conditions in November and December 1944, the barracks were not heated. In addition, many prisoners had to do hard labor, especially in the anti-tank trenches. An anti-tank trench was four to five meters wide and three to five meters deep. Exposed to malnutrition and the beatings of Kapos, prisoners often worked eleven to twelve hours a day in freezing water.

The prisoners had already arrived in Ladelund malnourished and weakened, and now they were subjected to rations that were in their official version starvation rations. In Ladelund, they did not even receive these, as the commandant withheld food. The death rate was soon so high that the subcamp in Neuengamme was considered a "death camp".

On 16 December 1944 the Friesenwall had become completely pointless due to the new military situation. The camp in Ladelund was dissolved and the surviving prisoners were taken back to Neuengamme.

=== Camp organization ===
==== Commandant ====
Camp commandant Hans Hermann Griem

The commandant of the Ladelund subcamp was SS-Untersturmführer Hans Hermann Griem. He embezzled food, took pleasure in sadistic tortures, personally shot several prisoners and was often drunk. After the camps were disbanded, he was commandant of the Emsland camp in Dalum until March 1945. Griem was never convicted for his actions.

The camp and administrative leader was SS-Oberscharführer Friedrich Otto Dröge. SS-Unterscharführer Georges was responsible for the logistics of the camp as "Rapport- und Blockführer". He was therefore directly responsible for the living conditions, supplies and accommodation of the prisoners.

==== Guards ====
The camp guards often consisted of SS-Totenkopfverbände (death's head units), which were reinforced by older marines who were no longer fit for field service. Ladelund was one of around 80 sub-camps of Neuengamme concentration camp and one of over 340 camps throughout the German Reich. The SS Death's Head units, who provided guards in the camps, were no longer sufficient to guard all these camps. In Ladelund, this meant that only the commandant and a few Unterscharführer belonged to the SS, while the guards consisted of soldiers from the navy. The navy presumably provided two companies (around 200 men) for this purpose, which consisted of older soldiers. Hitler had personally ordered their deployment in 1944. They were given basic training for their deployment in the camps, including drawings from a picture book for concentration camp guards. These soldiers were housed in the village of Ladelund.

==== Kapos ====
Prisoners with criminal backgrounds, the Kapos, were deployed as block elders and foremen to torture the prisoners. They were usually convicted violent criminals who had been brought into concentration camp service from penitentiaries and prisons, as they were believed to have a high propensity for violence. Many of the Kapos had already been deployed as Kapos in the Husum-Schwesing camp, including Wilhelm Schneider, who was born in Dortmund in 1911, had many previous convictions and had been in "preventive detention" since 1939. In September 1944, he became Kapo in Husum-Schwesing and, from November 1944, supervising Arbeitseinsatz-Kapo in Ladelund. Wilhelm Demmer, born in Moers in 1904, was convicted several times after 1922. He had been in Neuengamme concentration camp since March 1944 and then also became a Kapo in Husum-Schwesing. From November, he was also Kapo in Ladelund.

Their tasks consisted of guarding the prisoners, intimidating them, forcing them to work and punishing them.

Foremen were assigned to the Kapos, who acted purely as supervisors and did not work themselves. The relatively high privileges corrupted many of those appointed as Kapos. In some cases, the SS selected prisoners from the outset who were prepared to earn their privileges through particular brutality and who had already "proven themselves" in the Husum-Schwesing camp.

=== Public reaction ===
In Ladelund and the surrounding area, forced laborers were mainly used in agriculture during the war years. The establishment of the subcamp confronted the village with the full reality of Nazi crimes of violence.

Many saw the prisoners on their way to work and heard the screams of the beaten. The guards were quartered in houses in the village. A farmer from Ladelund had to take the bodies to the cemetery in his cart. Death certificates were drawn up daily at the registry office. Some people in Ladelund believed that just sentences were being served in the subcamp; however, there were also some attempts to help.

=== Burial site ===
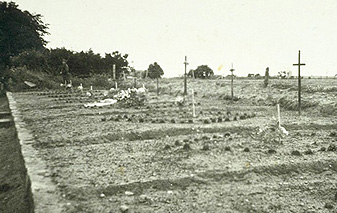
The gravesite of the victims, 1945

The victims of the Ladelund concentration camp were buried in nine graves at the edge of the village cemetery. However, in contrast to common practice, the concentration camp victims were buried by the then parish pastor Johannes Meyer (who was himself a long-time member of the NSDAP and a German Christian and refused to participate in the prosecution of the perpetrators of Ladelund) as best as was possible under Christian tradition on church land. Their names were recorded in the church records of the parish of St. Petri Ladelund and on the graves. Pastor Meyer reported in detail about "The concentration camp" in the church chronicle and justified the attitude of the parish. The records also served to exonerate him. Due to his early commitment to National Socialism, he had to fear being removed from office by the British occupying power. He completed his denazification process in 1948. After the end of the war, Pastor Meyer sought contact with grieving relatives. The grave site was dignified and became the starting point and center of remembrance and international encounters as early as 1950.

== After 1945 ==
In 1945/46, the camp grounds near Ladelund were used as a military hospital for the aftercare of amputated soldiers. From 1946 to 1959, up to 200 refugees and displaced people were housed here. After that, the barracks were gradually sold by the responsible district administration and the land was handed back to the tenant. In 1970, the last remaining barrack was demolished after the state, district and municipality had compensated the owner with 5500 DM.

=== Legal processing ===
In 1945, the British military judiciary began investigating the Ladelund concentration camp case. Commandant Griem, other members of the SS and the Kapos were put on trial from 1947 and sentenced to heavy penalties. Friedrich Otto Dröge and SS-Unterscharführer Georges could no longer be found after the war. Commander Griem managed to escape shortly before the trial began. It was not until 1963 that the Flensburg public prosecutor's office resumed the investigation against Griem, but did not make much progress until 1965, when Griem's whereabouts could be determined. He had moved to Hamburg-Bergedorf, whereupon the case was handed over to the Hamburg public prosecutor's office in 1966. They began systematic investigations and sought a trial against Griem, and on 16 January 1969 the Hamburg District Court opened the preliminary investigation against Griem. Shortly before the actual trial began, Griem died on 25 June 1971.

=== Memorial site ===
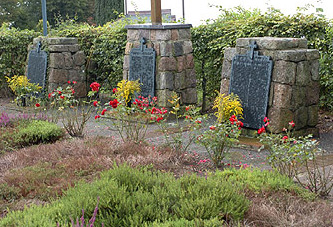
Memorial with the names of the victims of the camp

The Ladelund concentration camp memorial and meeting place is the oldest concentration camp memorial in Schleswig-Holstein and one of the oldest in Germany. It officially began its memorial work in 1950 on the initiative of the local parish pastor, who had kept the register of the prisoners buried in the church cemetery in 1944, with the participation of those affected and relatives of the victims. In the 1980s, Flensburg secondary school teacher Jörn-Peter Leppien designed an exhibition that was on display until 2017. There has been a full-time director since 1995. The memorial is run by the local Evangelical-Lutheran parish and has since been supported by the state of Schleswig-Holstein, the Northern Church and the Nordfriesland church district.

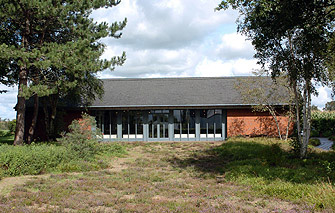
Document house

In 1989, a document house was built within sight of the graves, housing a permanent historical exhibition on the history of the subcamp with its pre- and post-history as well as a small media room, which can also be used as a seminar room. In summer 2006, an extension to the building was inaugurated, enabling the memorial and meeting place to cope with the growing number of visitors.

At the edge of the former camp, the last barrack of which was demolished in 1970, a memorial stone commemorates the events of 1944 and bears the inscription:

"THE DIGNITY

OF MAN

IS INVIOLABLE

CONCENTRATION CAMP NEUENGAMME

FOREIGN COMMAND

LADELUND

NOV. - DEC. 1944"

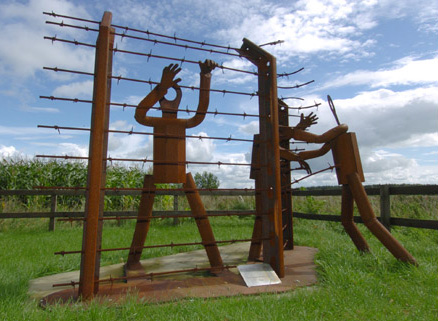
Sculpture erected by young people

In May/June 2002, as part of a joint project with the Ladelund Memorial, young people from the Theodor Schäfer Vocational Training Center in Husum erected a steel sculpture commemorating the fate of the concentration camp prisoners.

On Remembrance Day 2010, the steel column Das Mal by Ansgar Nierhoff († August 2, 2010) was unveiled at the former Panzergraben as a "memorial, landmark and sign of expiation".

The exhibition, which has been housed in the Document House since 1990, was modernized after 25 years at the request of the current director of the memorial. With the help of funding from the federal government, the state of Schleswig-Holstein and the North Church, modern narrative techniques have been used since 2017. The renovation cost a total of 500,000 euros. In the exhibition, which opened in November 2017, display boards, audio and film stations as well as biographies in German, Danish, English and Dutch provide information about the fate of the prisoners.

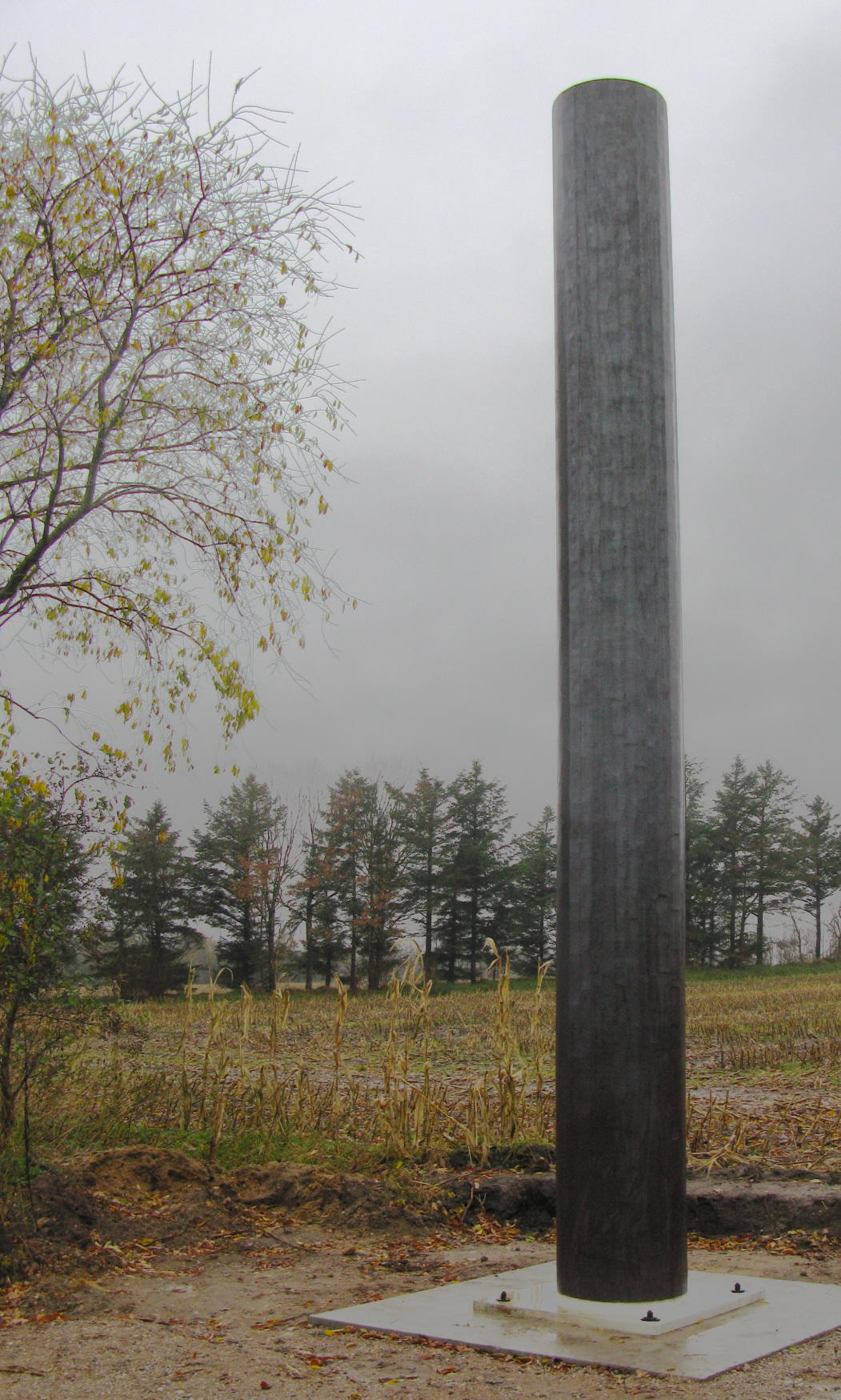
Steel column Das Mal by Ansgar Nierhoff (2010)

== Bibliography ==
- Alsen, Raimo (2015). Der Putten-Ladelund loop. Ein Staffellauf zum Gedenken an die KZ-Opfer ['] (in German). Grenzfriedenshefte. pp. 149–160.
- Alsen, Raimo; Königseder, Angelika (2017). Das KZ im Dorf. Geschichte und Nachgeschichte des Außenlagers Ladelund (in German). Metropol Verlag. ISBN 978-3-86331-374-6.
- Bästlein, Klaus. "Der Haupttäter wurde verschont. Zur Strafverfolgung der in den nordfriesischen Konzentrationslagern verübten NS-Gewaltverbrechen". Arbeitskreis zur Erforschung des Nationalsozialismus in Schleswig-Holstein (in German). 54. Kiel: 56–113.
- Gedenkstätten und Erinnerungsorte zur Geschichte des Nationalsozialismus in Schleswig-Holstein. Wegweiser und Bildungsangebote (PDF). Bürgerstiftung Schleswig-Holsteinische Gedenkstätten. 2021.
- Dekker, Pieter; van Dompseler, Gert (2014). Van naam tot nummer. Slachtoffers van de Puttense razzia (in Dutch). Leeuwarden: Uitgeverij Louise.
- Garbe, Detlef (2008). "Die nordfriesischen Außenkommandos des KZ Neuengamme. Geschichte und Gedenken". Grenzfriedenshefte. 3: 257–268.
- Gundermann, Christine (2014). Christine Gundermann: Die versöhnten Bürger. Der Zweite Weltkrieg in deutsch-niederländischen Begegnungen 1945–2000. Münster: Waxmann.
- Haupenthal, Uwe (2011). ""Das Mal". Ansgar Nierhoffs Stele am ehemaligen Panzerabwehrgraben in der KZ-Gedenk- und Begegnungsstätte Ladelund". Grenzfriedenshefte. 2: 117–126.
- de Keizer, Madelon (2001). Razzia in Putten. Verbrechen der Wehrmacht in einem niederländischen Dorf (in German). Köln: Dittrich.
- Kramer, Willi (2011). "Die Öffnung des Panzerabwehrgrabens bei Ladelund. Was hinter den Dingen steht". Grenzfriedenshefte. 3: 167–174.
- Leppien, Jörn-Peter (1983). ""Das waren keine Menschen mehr …", aus der Chronik der Kirchengemeinde. Pastor Johannes Meyer über das Konzentrationslager Ladelund 1944. Eine quellenkritische Studie". Grenzfriedenshefte. 3.
- Leppien, Jörn-Peter (2006). "Erinnern für Gegenwart und Zukunft. Die historische Dokumentation in der KZ-Gedenk- und Begegnungsstätte Ladelund". Grenzfriedenshefte. 4: 277–294.
- Leppien, Jörn-Peter (2010). "Sklavenarbeit für den "Endkampf". Die Grenzstellung 1944/45 und das KZ Ladelund". Grenzfriedenshefte. 3: 203–236.
- Leppien, Jörn-Peter (2014). "Von der Nummer zum Namen. Die KZ-Toten in Ladelund 1944". Grenzfriedenshefte: 79–114.
- Penno, Karin (2020). Minderheiten in der NS-Zeit. Vom getrennten Gestern zum verbindenden Heute. Ladelund.
- Richter, Harald (1983). Wir haben das Selbstverständliche getan – Ein Außenlager des KZ Neuengamme bei uns in Ladelund, Gräber auf dem Friedhof und Erfahrungen, für die wir dankbar sind (in German). Bornheim-Merten: Detlef Garbe. pp. 121–143.
- Richter, Harald (2014). Hinabgestiegen in das Reich des Todes. Das Konzentrationslager, Pastor Meyer und kirchliche Gedenkstättenarbeit in Ladelund (in German). Hannover: Luth. Verlagshaus.
- Schmid, Harald (2018). Ein Wendepunkt in der regionalen Erinnerungskultur: Die erste KZ-Gedenkstätte Schleswig-Holsteins in Ladelund 1950/90 (in German). Schleswig-Holstein. Die Kulturzeitschrift für den Norden. pp. 72–77.
