= Danish exonyms =

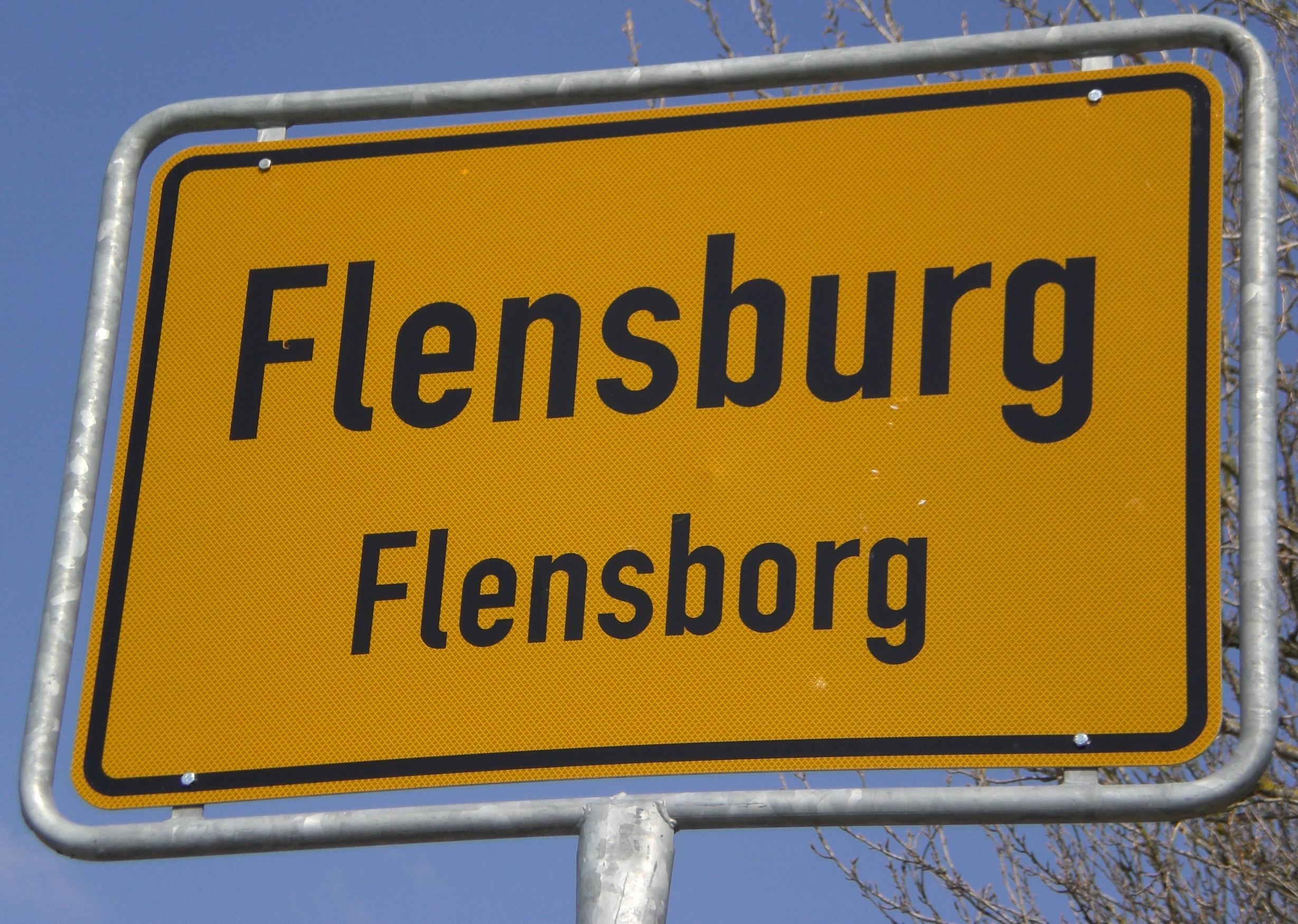
Bilingual town sign of Flensburg, Germany

Danish language exonyms for non-Danish speaking locations exist, primarily in Europe, but many of these are no longer commonly used, with a few notable exceptions. Rom (Rome), Lissabon (Lisboa (Lisbon)), Sankt Petersborg (St Petersburg) and Prag (Prague) are still compulsory, while e.g. Venedig is more common than Venezia (Venice). In the decades following World War II, there has been a strong tendency towards replacing Danish exonyms with the native equivalent used in the foreign country itself. Possibly this is because many of these Danish forms (e.g. for names in Belgium, Italy and Eastern Europe) were imported from German.

Until recently, it was official Danish policy to use Danish exonyms on road signs if Danish forms were commonly used and known. This has, however, been changed following a change in international agreements. Currently, one can still see Danish road signs pointing towards Flensborg and Hamborg across the border, however Nibøl has been replaced by Niebüll. Signs leading to the Sound Bridge usually have Malmø with Danish spelling.

In Southern Schleswig, the region south of the Danish-German border, a set of original (or, in some cases, reconstructed) Danish placenames exists alongside the German names, just as most North Slesvig placenames have German counterparts dating from the period under Prussian rule (1864–1920). The Danish placenames in Southern Schleswig are used by the local Danish minority and their media, while some in Denmark may avoid using them for political reasons. The use of German placenames in North Slesvig is similarly preferred by the local German minority (when speaking and writing German), but traditionally shunned by many Danes in the region. From 2008, municipalities in Schleswig-Holstein have been allowed bilingual town signs with the official minority languages: Danish, North Frisian and Low German. So far, the city of Flensburg has been the only municipality to introduce bilingual German/Danish signs.

Danish placenames dating from the colonial era exist for almost all major settlements in Greenland. Some of the places in question were founded as settlements under a Danish name, while others were originally Greenlandic toponyms. Very frequently, the Danish and Greenlandic names have different etymologies; while the former are often named after settlers or explorers, the latter usually describe geographical features. In 1983, a Danish law officially transferred the naming authority to the Greenlandic Home Rule. During the years before and after that, a complete set of Greenlandic placenames have ousted the former traditional Danish names. Danish names in Greenland are now mostly known or used by older-generation Danish-speakers or by Danes living in Greenland. Until recently, Greenland was still – both officially and de facto – bilingual, but Greenlandic has assumed the status of sole official language in Greenland, following the island's recent change from hjemmestyre (home rule) to selvstyre (autonomy).

Faroese placenames were Danicised in an era when no Faroese orthography existed, but the Danish names were replaced by Faroese ones during the first half of the 20th century (somewhat later on maps). Today only Thorshavn is commonly used (alongside the Faroese Tórshavn and the hybrid Torshavn).

An example of radical use of Danish exonyms can be found in many street names on the island of Amager, a part of Copenhagen. The city expanded greatly during the first half of the 20th century. Dozens of streets in the district were named after European cities or regions. It was deemed suitable for practical reasons that street names were adapted to Danish spelling rules, resulting in names such as Nyrnberggade and Lyneborggade.

== Albania ==
Albania
English name	Danish name	Endonym		Notes
English name	Danish name	Name	Language	Notes
Tirana	Tirana	Tiranë	Albanian	

== Belgium ==
Belgium
English name	Danish name	Endonym		Notes
English name	Danish name	Name	Language	Notes
Bruges	Brügge, Brygge	Brugge	Dutch	
Brussels	Bryssel	Bruxelles	French	
Ostend	Ostende	Oostende	Dutch	

== Czechia ==
Czechia
English name	Danish name	Endonym		Notes
English name	Danish name	Name	Language	Notes
Bohemia	Bøhmen	Čechy	Czech	
Moravia	Mæhren	Morava	Czech	
Prague	Prag	Praha	Czech	
Plzeň	Pilsen	Plzeň	Czech	
Silesia	Schlesien, Slesien	Slezsk	Czech	
Silesia	Schlesien, Slesien	Ślōnsk	Silesian	
Sudetenland	Sudeterlandet	Sudety	Czech	

== Denmark ==
=== Faroe Islands ===
Modern Danish generally uses the original Faroese names. Torshavn / Thorshavn is still in active use. Fuglefjord, Klaksvig and Tværå are also occasionally seen. Also seen are variants where ð and á are replaced by d and å, and/ or accents omitted for á, í, ó, ú, ý. English generally has no established exonyms for any Faroese placenames.

Faroe Islands
English/ Faroese name	Danish name	Notes
Áirnar	Åerne	
Akrar	Øgrum	
Argir	Arge	
Árnafjørður	Arnefjord	
Borðoy	Bordø	
Bøur	Bø	
Dalur	Dal	
Depil	Deble	
Eiði	Ejde	
Elduvík	Eldevig	
Eysturoy	Østerø	
Fámjin	Famien	
Froðba	Frodebø	
Fuglafjørður	Fuglefjord	
Fugloy	Fuglø	
Funningsfjørður	Fundingsfjørd	
Funningur	Funding	
Gásadalur	Gåsedal	
Gjógv	Gjov	
Glyvrar	Glibre	
Gøtueiði	Gøteejde	
Gøtugjógv	Gøtegjov	
Haldarsvík	Haldersvig	
Hattarvík	Hattervig	
Hellur	Heller	
Hósvík	Thorsvig	
Hov	Hove	
Hoyvík	Højvig	
Húsar	Husum	
Húsavík	Husevig	
Hvalba	Hvalbø	
Hvalvík	Kvalvig	
Hvannasund	Kvannesund	
Hvítanes	Hvidenæs	
Kalsoy	Kalsø	
Kirkja	Kirke	
Kirkjubøur	Kirkebø	
Klaksvík	Klaksvig	
Kollafjørður	Kollefjord	
Koltur	Kolter	
Kunoy	Kunø	
Kvívík	Kvivig, Qvivig	
Lambi	Lamhauge	
Langasandur	Langesand	
Leirvík	Lervig	
Leynar	Lejnum	
Lítla Dímun	Lille Dimon	
Ljósá	Lyså	
Miðvágur	Midvåg	
Mikladalur	Mygledal	
Morkranes	Moskernæs	
Múli	Mule	
Mykines	Myggenæs	
Nes	Næs	
Nólsoy	Nolsø	
Norðadalur	Nordredal	
Norðdepil	Norddeble	
Norðoyri	Nordøre	
Norðtoftir	Nordtofte	
Norðragøta	Nodregøte	
Norðskáli	Nordskåle	
Øravík	Ørdevig	
Oyndarfjørður	Andefjørd	
Oyrarbakki	Ørebakke	
Oyri	Øre	
Porkeri	Porkere	
Rituvík	Ridevig	
Runavík	Rundevig	
Saksun	Saksen	
Saltangará	Salttangerå	
Saltnes	Saltnæs	
Sandavágur	Sandevåg	
Sandoy	Sandø	
Sandur	Sand	
Selatrað	Selletræ	
Signabøur	Signebø	
Skálavík	Skålevig	
Skálabotnur	Skålebotn	
Skálafjørður	Skålefjord	
Skáli	Skåle	
Skælingur	Skælling	
Skarð	Skår	
Skarvanes	Skarvenæs	
Skipanes	Skibenæs	
Skopun	Skopen	
Skúvoy	Skuø	
Søldarfjørður	Solmunderfjørd	
Sørvágur	Sørvåg	
Strendur	Strænder	
Streymnes	Strømnæs	
Streymoy	Strømø	
Stóra Dímun	Store Dimon	
Stykkið	Stikket	
Suðuroy	Syderø	
Sumba	Sumbø, Sunnbø	
Svínoy	Svinø	
Syðradalur	Sydredal	
Syðrugøta	Sydregøte	
Tjørnuvík	Tjørnevig	
Toftir	Tofte	
Tórshavn	Thorshavn	
Trøllanes	Troldanæs	
Trongisvágur	Trangisvåg	
Tvøroyri	Tværå	
Vagoy	Vågø	
Vágur	Våg	
Velbastaður	Velbestad	
Vestmanna	Vestmannahavn	
Viðareiði	Viderejde	
Viðoy	Viderø	
Víkarbyrgi	Vigerbirge	

=== Greenland ===
English lacks exonyms for any Greenlandic placename.

Greenland
English/ Greenlandic name	Danish name	Notes
Aasiaat	Egedesminde	
Alluitsup Paa	Sydprøven	
Ammassivik	Sletten	
Appat	Rittenbenck	Abandoned settlement
Ilimanaq	Claushavn	
Ilulissat	Jacobshavn	
Itterajivit	Kap Hope	Abandoned settlement
Ittoqqortoormiit	Scorebysund	
Kangeq	Håbets Ø	Abandoned settlement
Kangerlussuaq	Søndre Strømfjord	
Kangerluarsoruseq	Færingehavn	Abandoned settlement
Kangersuatsiaq	Prøven	
Kangilinnguit	Grønnedal	
Kitsissuarsuit	Hunde Ejlande	
Kulusuk	Kap Dan	
Maniitsoq	Sukkertoppen	
Narsak	Nordprøven	
Narsarmijit	Frederiksdal	
Nuuk	Godthåb	
Nuussuaq	Kraulshavn	
Paamiut	Frederikshåb	
Qaanaaq	Thule	
Qaqortoq	Julianehåb	
Qasigiannguit	Christianshåb	
Qeqertaq	Øen	
Qeqertarsuaq	Godhavn	
Qeqertarsuatsiaat	Fiskenæsset	
Qeqertarsuup tunua	Diskobugt	
Saqqaq	Solsiden	
Sisimiut	Holsteinsborg	
Ullersuaq	Kap Alexander	
Uummannarsuaq	Kap Farvel	
Uunarteq	Kap Tobin	Abandoned settlement

== Estonia ==
Estonia
English name	Danish name	Endonym		Notes
English name	Danish name	Name	Language	Notes
Hiiumaa	Dagø	Hiiumaa	Estonian	
Saaremaa	Øsel	Saaremaa	Estonian	
Tallinn	Reval	Tallinn	Estonian	
Tartu	Dorpat	Tartu	Estonian	

== Finland ==
Finland is officially bilingual, and many places in the country have different names in Finnish and Swedish, both being official endonyms. In Danish, Swedish names (Helsingfors instead of Helsinki, Åbo instead of Turku) are used for more well-known places. For less well-known places (to Danes, at any rate) Finnish-language names are typically used. (Lappeenranta instead of Villmanstrand, Iisalmi instead of Idensalmi).

== France ==
France
English name	Danish name	Endonym		Notes
English name	Danish name	Name	Language	Notes
Alsace	Elsas	Alsace	French	Obsolete
Aquitaine	Aquitanien	Aquitània	Occitan	
Brittany	Bretagne, Bretanje	Bretagne	French	
Corsica	Korsika, Korsike	Corsica	Corsu	
Normandy	Normandiet	Normandie	French	
Occitania	Occitanien	Occitània	Occitan	
Picardy	Pikardiet	Picardie	French	
Strasbourg	Strasborg	Strasbourg	French	Obsolete

== Germany ==
Danish has a very large number of exonyms for locations in modern Germany. Almost all of these are originally Danish names in the region of Southern Schleswig, a Danish territory until 1864 and still home to a Danish minority. Some of these exonyms are not commonly known in Denmark proper, but remain in use among the Danish minority in Germany and its newspaper, Flensborg Avis, and among the few remaining speakers of the South Jutlandic dialect south of the border. The names are also traditionally used by Danish historians, although some modern academics dismiss the usage of Danish exonyms outside present Denmark, at least in writing. Larger and well-known locations are more likely to be referred to by means of a Danish exonym, e.g. Flensborg and Slesvig [By], but also Hamborg which is not in the Schleswig region. The historical Dannevirke fortification and Hedeby are always referred to by its Danish name.

While almost all placenames in Schleswig north of the medieval language border (a line between Husum and Eckernförde, excluding the North Frisian area) are of genuine Danish (North Germanic) origin, there have also been limited attempts to construct Danish alternatives for placenames in the extreme southern part of Schleswig, which is originally German (Low Saxon) speaking (similar to the genuine Danish place names in North Slesvig, that have German constructed counterparts dating from the period under Prussian rule 1864–1920). The latter names, as well as Danicised placenames in the Frisian area, are less commonly used. Before 1864, when the Danish monarchy comprised the Duchy of Holstein, there was also sporadic usage of Danicised spellings of placenames in Holstein, such as Plø(e)n (Plön) and Vandsbæk (Wandsbek). The latter name is still seen in the Danish phrase "ad Vandsbæk til" (see: Wandsbek (quarter)#History).

Germany
English name	Danish name	Endonym		Notes
English name	Danish name	Name	Language	Notes
Anglia	Angel	Angeln		
Arnis	Arnæs			
Ascheffel	Askfelt			
Aschau	Askov			
Bargum	Bjerrum			
Bergenhusen	Bjerringhus			
Brocken	Bloksbjerg			
Böklund	Bøglund			
Bredstedt	Bredsted			
Brunswick	Brunsvig	Brunswiek; Braunschweig	Low German; German	
Büdelsdorf	Bydelstorp			
Dagebüll	Dagebøl			
Danish Wahld	Jernved, Dänischwohld, Danske Skov	Dänischer Wohld		
Dannewerk	Dannevirke			
Dithmarschen	Ditmarsken			
Drelsdorf	Trelstrup			
Eckernförde	Egernfjord, Egernførde, Ekernførde			
Eggebek	Eggebæk			
Eider	Ejderen			
Eiderstedt	Ejdersted			
Elbe	Elben			
Eschelsmark	Eskilsmark			
Fehmarn	Femern			
Flensburg	Flensborg			
Friedrichsberg	Friedriksberg			
Friedrichstadt	Frederiksstad			
Fræzlæt	Fræslet, Freslet, Fredslet			
Föhr	Før			
Föhrden	Førden			
Gettorf	Gettorp			
Gottorf	Gottorp			
Glücksburg	Lyksborg, Glücksborg			
Glückstadt	Lykstad			Rare
Grundhof	Grumtoft			
Hamburg	Hamborg			
Haithabu	Hedeby			
Handewitt	Hanved			
Harrislee	Harreslev			
Harz	Harzen			
Herzogtum Sachsen-Lauenburg	Hertugdømmet Lauenborg			
Hesterberg	Hestebjerg			
Hollehitt	Holdhid			
Holstein	Holsten			
Holtenau	Holtenå			
Hüllerup	Hylderup			
Hüttener Berge	Hytten Bjerge			
Idstedt	Isted			
Jarplund-Weding	Jaruplund-Vedding			
Jellenbek in Schwedeneck	Jellenbæk			
Jerrishoe	Jerrishøj			
Joldelund	Hjoldelund			
Jübeck	Jy(d)bæk			
Jürgensby	Jørgensby			
Kappeln	Kappel			
Karlsburg in Schwansen	Gereby			
Klanxbüll	Klangsbøl			
Klixbüll	Klægsbøl			
Krusendorf in Schwedeneck	Krusentorp			
Kupfermühle	Kobbermølle			
Langballig	Langballe			
Lauenburg	Lauenborg			
Leck	Læk			
Lindewitt	Lindved			
Lindau	Lindå			
Lohe	Lo			
Lollfuß in Schleswig	Lolfod			
Löwenstedt	Lyngsted, Løvensted			
Lübeck	Lybæk			
Ludwigsburg in Schwansen	Ludvigsborg, Kohøved			
Lüneburg	Lyneborg			
Lüngerau	Lyngvrå			
Lürschauer Heide	Lyrskov Hede			
Lutzhöft	Lyshøj			
Maasbüll	Masbøl			
Maasleben	Maslev, Måslev			
Mecklenburg	Meklenborg			
Missunde	Mysunde			
Mohrkirch	Mårkær			
Mürwik	Mørvig			
Niebüll	Nybøl ved Slesvig by			
Oeversee	Oversø			
Oldenburg	Oldenborg			
Ostenfeld	Østerfjolde, Øster Fjolde			
Owschlag	Okslev			
Pellworm	Pelvorm			
Querfurt	Kvernford			Obsolete
Quern	Kvæarn			
Rendsburg	Rendsborg, Rensborg, Rejnoldsborg			
Rieseby	Risby			
Roikier	Rojkær			
Rundhof	Rundtoft			
Rügen	Rygen, Ry			
Rüllschau	Rylskov			
Schafflund	Skovlund			
Scheggerott	Skæggerød			
Schlei	Slien			
Schleimünde	Slieminde			
Schleswig	Slesvig (By)			
Schrepperie	Skræpperi			
Schuby	Skovby			
Schwansen	Svans(ø), Svansen			
Schwesing	Svesing			
Sorgbrück	Sorgbro			
Steinbergkirche	Stenbjergkirke			
Streichmühle	Strygmølle			
Struxdorf	Strukstrup			
Sylt	Sild			
Taarstedt	Torsted			
Treene	Trene(n)			
Treia	Treja			
Twedt	Tved			
Uelsby	Ølsby			
Ulsnis	Ulsnæs			
Unewatt	Undevad			
Unaften	Ondaften			
Vollerwiek	Follervig			
Wallsbüll	Valsbøl			
Wassersleben	Sosti			German name also used in Danish
Wees	Ves			
Westerholz	Vesterskov			
Westermühlen	Vestermølle			
Winderatt	Venerød			
Wyk auf Föhr	Vyk på Før			

== Greece ==
Greece
English name	Danish name	Endonym		Notes
English name	Danish name	Name	Language	Notes
Athens	Athen	Athína	Greek	
Corfu	Korfu	Kérkyra	Greek	
Corinth	Korinth	Kórinth	Greek	
Crete	Kreta	Kriti	Greek	
Piraeus	Piræus	Piraifs	Greek	
Rhodes	Rhodos	Rodhos	Greek	

== Iceland ==
Iceland
English name	Danish name	Endonym		Notes
English name	Danish name	Name	Language	Notes
Hafnarfjörður	Havnefjord			
Ísafjörður	Isafjord			Used in various Danish street names, such as Isafjordsgade in Copenhagen and Isafjordvej in Roskilde

== India ==
India
English name	Danish name	Endonym		Notes
English name	Danish name	Name	Language	Notes
Nicobar Islands	Frederiksøerne			Danish colonial name
Serampore	Frederiksnagore			Danish colonial name
Tharangambadi	Trankebar, Tranquebar			Danish colonial name

== Italy ==
Italy
English name	Danish name	Endonym		Notes
English name	Danish name	Name	Language	Notes
Florence	Florens	Firenze	Italian	
Genoa	Genova, Genua	Genova	Italian	
Mantua	Mantova, Mantua	Mantova	Italian	
Milan	Mailand	Milano	Italian	
Naples	Neapel	Napoli	Italian	Mainly in expression Se Neapel og dø ("see Naples and die")
Rome	Rom	Roma	Italian	
Sardinia	Sardinien	Sardegna	Italian	
Sicily	Sicilien	Sicilia	Italian	
Syracuse	Syrakus	Siracusa	Italian	
Torino	Torino, Turin	Torino	Italian	
Torino	Torino, Turin	Turin	Piedmontese	
Venice	Venedig	Venezia	Italian	
Venice	Venedig	Venexia	Venetian	

== Lithuania ==
Lithuania
English name	Danish name	Endonym		Notes
English name	Danish name	Name	Language	Notes
Klaipėda	Memel	Klaipėda	Lithuanian	
Vilnius	Vilna, Vilnius	Vilnius	Lithuanian	

== Luxembourg ==
Luxembourg
English name	Danish name	Endonym		Notes
English name	Danish name	Name	Language	Notes
Luxembourg City	Luxembourg, Luxemburg, Luxemborg, Lyksemborg	Lëtzebuerg	Luxembourgish	All forms pronounced like Luxemborg

== Netherlands ==
Netherlands
English name	Danish name	Endonym		Notes
English name	Danish name	Name	Language	Notes
Alkmaar	Alkmar	Alkmaar	Dutch	Obsolete
Edam	Eidam, Ejdam	Edam	Dutch	Latter only common in name of Edam cheese, Ejdammer
Enkhuizen	Enkhysen	Enkhuizen	Dutch	Obsolete
Groningen	Grøningen	Groningen	Dutch	Obsolete
Monnickendam	Mønnikedam	Monnickendam	Dutch	Obsolete
Muiden	Myden	Muiden	Dutch	Obsolete
Naarden	Narden	Naarden	Dutch	Obsolete
The Hague	Haag	Den Haag	Dutch	Pronounced /hæˀɣ/
Utrecht	Ytregt	Utrecht	Dutch	Obsolete
Voorburg	Forborg	Voorburg	Dutch	Obsolete

== Norway ==
From the 16th until the late 19th century, Danish was officially used, replacing the Norwegian written language, but then spelling reforms gradually replaced it with Dano-Norwegian and the two present-day forms of Norwegian: Bokmål and Nynorsk. Until then, a lot of Norwegian placenames were written in Danish. Almost all of them are now obsolete and not even used in Danish historical contexts. They may, however, still be used in the names of Norwegian newspapers, companies, institutions and associations. In present-day Norway, they will often be perceived more as "ancient" names than as Danish ones.

Norway
English name	Danish name	Endonym		Notes
English name	Danish name	Name	Language	Notes
Bear Island	Bjørneøen	Bjørnøya	Norwegian	"Øya" means "island". Several more islands in Norway ending in øya might be translated to øen in Danish, although less common now.
Oslo	Christiania	Oslo	Norwegian	archaic; official name of Oslo until 1925 (although spelled Kristiania from 1877 onwards). Today mostly associated with the Copenhagen free town by the same name.
Finnmark	Finmark(en)	Finnmark	Norwegian	archaic
Larvik	Laurvig(en)	Larvik	Norwegian	archaic
Trondheim	Trondhjem	Trondheim	Norwegian	occasionally seen in Danish, and very often used in spoken language even in Norway

== Poland ==
Poland
English name	Danish name	Endonym		Notes
English name	Danish name	Name	Language	Notes
Gdańsk	Danzig	Gdańsk	Polish	
Łódź	Lodz	Łódź	Polish	Endonym also used
Pomerania	Pommern	Pomorze	Polish	
Świnoujście	Swinoujscie, Swinemünde, Svinemynde	Świnoujście	Polish	Endonym also used
Szczecin	Stettin	Szczecin	Polish	
Wrocław	Wroclaw, Breslau	Wrocław	Polish	Endonym also used

== Portugal ==
Portugal
English name	Danish name	Endonym		Notes
English name	Danish name	Name	Language	Notes
Lisbon	Lissabon	Lisboa	Portuguese	

== Romania ==
Romania
English name	Danish name	Endonym		Notes
English name	Danish name	Name	Language	Notes
Bucharest	Bukarest	București	Romanian	
Transylvania	Transsilvanien, Transsylvanien	Transilvania	Romanian	

== Russia ==
Russia
English name	Danish name	Endonym		Notes
English name	Danish name	Name	Language	Notes
Ingria	Ingermanland			
Kaliningrad	Königsberg	Kaliningrad	Russian	
Karelia	Karelen			
Rybachiy Peninsula	Fiskerhalvøen	Polyostrov Rybachiy	Russian	
Saint Petersburg	Sankt Petersborg	Sankt-Peterburg	Russian	

== South Africa ==
South Africa
English name	Danish name	Endonym		Notes
English name	Danish name	Name	Language	Notes
Cape Town	Kapstaden	Kaapstad	Afrikaans	
Cape Town	Kapstaden	Cape Town	English	English name also used in Danish
Cape Town	Kapstaden	iKapa	Xhosa	
Johannesburg	Johannesborg	Johannesburg	English	

== Spain ==
Spain
English name	Danish name	Endonym		Notes
English name	Danish name	Name	Language	Notes
Aragon	Aragon, Aragonien	Aragón	Spanish	
Asturias	Asturien			
Basque Country	Baskerlandet, Baskien	Euskal Herria	Basque	
Canary Islands	Kanariske Øer	Islas Canarias	Spanish	
Castile	Castilien, Kastilien	Castilla	Spanish	
Catalonia	Catalonien, Katalonien	Catalunya	Catalan	
Costa del Sol	Solkysten	Costa del Sol	Spanish	
Galicia	Galicien			

== Sweden ==
Sweden
English name	Danish name	Endonym		Notes
English name	Danish name	Name	Language	Notes
Älvsborg	Elfsborg	Älvsborg	Swedish	Also pre-1906 Swedish spelling
Ängelholm	Engelholm	Ängelholm	Swedish	
Barsebäck	Barsebæk	Barsebäck	Swedish	
Båstad	Baadsted	Båstad	Swedish	Archaic
Blekinge	Bleging	Blekinge	Swedish	Archaic
Brömsebäck	Brømsebæk	Brömsebäck	Swedish	
Falkenberg	Falkenbjerg	Falkenberg	Swedish	Archaic
Gotland	Gulland	Gotland	Swedish	Archaic
Göinge	Gønge (Herred)	Göinge	Swedish	
Gothenburg	Gøteborg	Göteborg	Swedish	
Halmstad	Halmsted	Halmstad	Swedish	Archaic
Hässleholm	Hesselholm	Hässleholm	Swedish	Archaic. In Swedish until 1906 Hessleholm.
Höganäs	Høj(e)næs	Höganäs	Swedish	Archaic
Knäred	Knærød	Knäred	Swedish	Archaic
Kristianstad	Christiansstad	Kristianstad	Swedish	Earlier spelling Christianstad is sometimes used in the town itself, and was official until the Swedish spelling reform of 1906
Kristianopel	Christianopel	Kristianopel	Swedish	
Kungsbacka	Kongsbak(ke)	Kungsbacka	Swedish	Archaic
Landskrona	Landskrone	Landskrona	Swedish	Archaic
Limhamn	Limhavn	Limhamn	Swedish	
Malmö	Malmø	Malmö	Swedish	
Östergötland	Øster Gylland	Östergötland	Swedish	Archaic
Simrishamn	Simmershavn	Simrishamn	Swedish	Archaic
Stockholm	Stokholm	Stockholm	Swedish	Archaic, never gained widespread use
Varberg	Varbjerg	Varberg	Swedish	Archaic
Vä	Væ	Vä	Swedish	
Västergötland	Vester Gylland	Västergötland	Swedish	Archaic
Ven	Hven	Ven	Swedish	Danish form also preferred by islanders, outlived Swedish spelling reform of 1906 and was official until 1958
Ystad	Ysted	Ystad	Swedish	Archaic

Some of these forms are archaic, based on names used in the 17th century prior to the surrender of the Eastern Danish lands Skåne, Halland and Blekinge to Sweden. Modern usage is primarily confined to history books and Scanian activists. These forms were also used in a number of texts in the first decades of the 20th century. The only example consistently used in modern Danish is Hven, maybe because this form hinders confusion with the Danish word ven ("friend"). Since the opening of the Øresund Bridge, the form Malmø has again gained widespread use above Malmö. Engelholm and Øland (Öland) are occasionally seen. Knærød and Elfsborg are relatively common in historical works, due to their connection to historical events; the 1613 Peace of Knäred (Freden i Knærød) and the Ransom of Älvsborg (Elfsborgs løsen). The forms Gønge and Gønge Herred are also quite common given their connection to Svend Poulsen Gønge, known from the historical novel and TV series, Gøngehøvdingen.

Some forms are just replacement of ä/ö with æ/ø based on computer keyboards used by the press. This can be used for further places, any with ä and ö, .e.g. Växjö or Östersund, but are often considered misspellings. This is in contrast to Swedish exonyms for places in Denmark where æ and ø are usually converted by the press.

== United States ==
United States
English name	Danish name	Endonym		Notes
English name	Danish name	Name	Language	Notes
California	Californien, Kalifornien	California	English	
New York	Ny Jork	New York	English	Obsolete
Pennsylvania	Pennsylvanien	Pennsylvania	English	
Saint Croix	Sankt Croix	Saint Croix	English	Pronounced /saŋd krɔjˀs/ in Danish
Saint John	Sankt Jan	Saint John	English	
Saint Thomas	Sankt Thomas	Saint Thomas	English	

The U.S. Virgin Islands were formerly a colony of Denmark, often referred to simply as Sankt Thomas, Sankt Jan og Sankt Croix.

== See also ==
- List of European exonyms
