= Bernhard Rust =

Minister of Science, Education and National Culture of Nazi Germany (1883–1945)

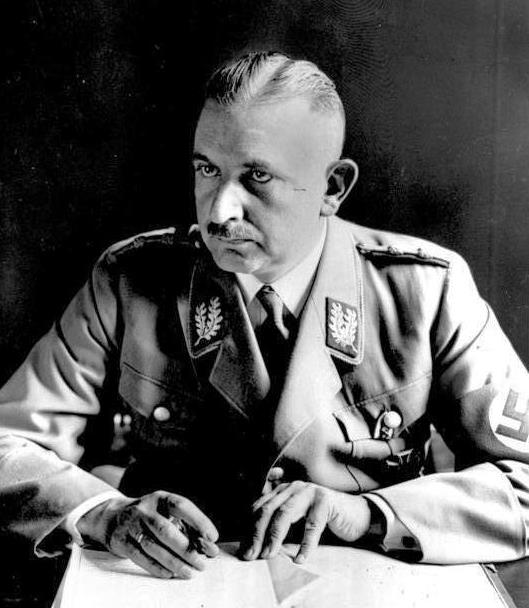
- Rust c.1934

Reich Minister of Science, Education and Culture
- In office 1 May 1934 – 30 April 1945
- Leader: Adolf Hitler
- Preceded by: Office established
- Succeeded by: Gustav Adolf Scheel

Prussian Minister for Science, Culture and Public Education
- In office 2 February 1933 – 1 May 1934
- Leader: Adolf Hitler
- Preceded by: Wilhelm Kähler
- Succeeded by: Office abolished

Gauleiter of South Hanover-Brunswick
- In office 1 October 1928 – November 1940
- Leader: Adolf Hitler
- Preceded by: Office established
- Succeeded by: Hartmann Lauterbacher

Gauleiter of North Hanover
- In office 22 March 1925 – 30 September 1928
- Leader: Adolf Hitler
- Preceded by: Office established
- Succeeded by: Office abolished

Additional positions
- 1933—1945: Member of the Prussian State Council
- 1933—1945: Member of the Reichstag (Nazi Germany)
- 1932: Landesinspekteur for Lower Saxony
- 1930—1933: Member of the Reichstag (Weimar Republic)

Personal details
- Born: Karl Josef Bernhard Rust; 30 September 1883 Hanover, Province of Hanover, German Empire
- Died: 8 May 1945 (aged 61) Nübel, Allied-occupied Germany
- Cause of death: Suicide
- Resting place: Neuberend
- Party: Nazi Party
- Other political affiliations: Deutschvölkischer Schutz- und Trutzbund; German Völkisch Freedom Party
- Spouses: Martha Haake (m. 1910; died 1919) Anna-Sofie Dietlein (m. 1920)
- Children: 4
- Parent(s): Johann Franz Rust (father); Josefa Deppe (mother)
- Occupation: Teacher
- Cabinet: Hitler Cabinet

Military service
- Allegiance: German Empire
- Branch/service: Imperial German Army
- Years of service: 1914–1918
- Rank: Oberleutnant
- Unit: Infantry Regiment 368; Infantry Regiment 232
- Battles/wars: World War I
- Awards: Iron Cross, 1st and 2nd class

Bernhard Rust (30 September 1883 – 8 May 1945) was Minister of Science, Education and National Culture (Reichserziehungsminister) in Nazi Germany. A combination of school administrator and zealous Nazi, he issued decrees, often bizarre, at every level of the German educational system to immerse German youth in Nazi ideology. He also served as the party Gauleiter in Hanover and Brunswick from 1925 to 1940.

== Life before politics ==
Rust was born in Hanover and obtained a doctorate in German philology and philosophy. After passing the state teaching examination with the grade "gut" (i.e. "good") in 1908, he became a high school teacher at Hanover's Ratsgymnasium, then served in the army during World War I. He reached the rank of Oberleutnant, served as a company commander and was awarded the Iron Cross first and second class for bravery. He was wounded in action and sustained a severe head injury, which caused serious mental and physical impairments for the rest of his life. He was discharged in December 1918 and returned to Hanover.

There, Rust founded and led a company of Einwohnerwehr (citizen militia) and participated in the Kapp Putsch, a failed attempt to overthrow the recently formed Weimar Republic. He became an active member of the Völkische Wehrbewegung Hannover, a local defense force, and also joined Der Stahlhelm, the militant war veterans' association. In addition, he became a member of Deutschvölkischer Schutz- und Trutzbund, the largest and most active antisemitic organization in Germany at that time.

== Political career ==
Rust joined the Nazi Party in 1921 and was a cofounder of the Ortsgruppe (Local Group) in Hanover. When the party was banned in the aftermath of the Beer Hall Putsch, Rust joined the German Völkisch Freedom Party and served as an Ortsgruppenleiter and later as Gauleiter for Hanover. When the ban on the Nazi Party was lifted, he rejoined it (membership number 3,390). On 22 March 1925, he was named Gauleiter for the Gau of North Hanover. On 10 September 1925, Rust joined the National Socialist Working Association headed by Gregor Strasser. This was an association of northern and western Gauleiter who supported the "socialist" wing of the Party until it was dissolved in 1926 following the Bamberg Conference.

When the Gaue were reorganised on 1 October 1928, Rust became the Gauleiter for Southern Hanover–Brunswick. He retained that position until November 1940, when he was succeeded by Hartmann Lauterbacher. In September 1930, he was elected to the Reichstag from electoral constituency 16, South Hanover-Braunschweig. He would retain this Reichstag seat through the end of the Nazi regime in 1945. On 15 July 1932 came his appointment as Landesinspekteur for Lower Saxony. In that position, he had oversight responsibility for his Gau and four others (Eastern-Hanover, North Westphalia, South Westphalia & Weser-Ems). That was a short-lived initiative by Gregor Strasser to centralise control over the Gaue. However, it was unpopular with the Gauleiter and was repealed on Strasser's fall from power in December 1932. Rust then returned to his Gauleiter position in Southern Hanover-Brunswick.

Shortly after Hitler became chancellor in January 1933, Rust was appointed as the Prussian Minister for Science, Culture and Public Education on 2 February. He was made a member of the Prussian State Council on 11 July and the Academy for German Law when it was formed in October 1933. On 1 May 1934, he was selected as Reichsminister of Science, Education and National Culture (Wissenschaft, Erziehung und Volksbildung) and set about to reshape the German educational system to conform to his ideals of Nazism. Considered by many to be mentally unstable, Rust would capriciously create new regulations and then repeal them just as quickly. One noted example was in 1935, when he changed the traditional six-day school week to five days, with Saturday to be "Reich's Youth Day", when children in the Hitler Youth and the League of German Girls would be out of school for study and testing. He then ordered the creation of a "rolling week", with six days for study, followed by the "youth day" and a rest day, in eight-day periods. Thus, a rolling week starting on Monday would end with rest on the following Monday. The next rolling week would start on Tuesday and end eight days later on the next Tuesday. When the eight-day week proved unworkable, Rust went back to the former system.

It was Rust who in 1933 issued a rule that students and teachers should greet each other with the Nazi salute "as a symbol of the new Germany". He added his opinion that it was "expected of every German", regardless of membership in the party. Rust was instrumental in purging German universities of Jews and others regarded as enemies of the state, most notably at the University of Göttingen. Nazi Germany's future leaders received their instruction elsewhere, in an NPEA, or "Napola" (NAtionalPOLitische erziehungsAnstalten), of which there were 30 in the nation, where they would receive training to become administrators of conquered provinces.

He bluntly informed teachers that their aim was to educate ethnically aware Germans. Rust also believed that non-Aryan science (such as Albert Einstein's "Jewish physics") was flawed and had what he felt to be a rational explanation for that view. In an address to scientists, he said, "The problems of science do not present themselves in the same way to all men. The Negro or the Jew will view the same world in a different light from the German investigator". Erika Mann, the daughter of Thomas Mann, wrote an exposé of the Rust system in 1938, School for Barbarians, followed in 1941 by Gregor Ziemer's Education for Death.

== Death ==
Rust reportedly committed suicide on 8 May 1945, when Germany surrendered to Allied forces.

== Spelling reform ==
Rust prepared a reform of German orthography, and his fairly-extensive version corresponded to the ideas of the spelling reformers of the 1970s (lowercase common nouns, elimination of lengthening symbols). The attempt met internal resistance within the Reich's ministry. The German orthography reform of 1944 also failed.

Before those failures, the rules of the reform had been printed in millions of copies intended for classroom use and published in numerous newspapers. The 1944 reform was postponed on the orders of Hitler because it was "not important for the war effort". Some of Rust's innovations had, however, found their way into the 1942 Duden, such as the spelling of the word Kautsch for Couch, which persisted into the 1980s.

Many of the proposed changes were finally implemented with the German orthography reform of 1996.
