= Toft village =

Settlement comprising small, closely packed farms

In England and Scotland, a toft village is a settlement comprising small and relatively closely packed farms (tofts) with the surrounding land owned and farmed by those who live in the village's buildings. Strips of land behind the tofts are called crofts, by analogy with Croft (land), with the resulting landscape pattern being labelled toft and croft.

== Etymology and placenames ==
Toft occurs in late Old English toft, with Old English declension (plural) toftas > tofts. Toft as a placename element is usually dated to the Viking Age by place-name historians.

Placenames ending in -toft are usually of Old Norse derivation, topt meaning "site of a house". Examples from Lincolnshire include Habertoft, Huttoft, Langtoft, and Newtoft. Examples elsewhere include: Knaptoft, Leicestershire; Langtoft, East Riding of Yorkshire; Lowestoft, Suffolk; Scraptoft, Leicestershire; Sibbertoft, Northamptonshire; Stowlangtoft, Suffolk; Wibtoft, Warwickshire; Yelvertoft Northamptonshire and various places simply called Toft in the former Danelaw.

This typical Old Norse element allows an estimation of the extension of Scandinavian settlements in the Middle Ages. For example, instances of -toft in Schleswig-Holstein include Langstoft, Havetoft, Koltoft, Goltoft, and Kaltoft. Examples of -tot in Normandy include Lanquetot, Colletot, Caltot (Saint-Laurent-en-Caux), Hottot-les-Bagues, and Hotot-en-Auge.
