= Brodersby =

Brodersby may refer to several places in Germany:

- Brodersby, Rendsburg-Eckernförde
- Brodersby, Schleswig-Flensburg
