= Günter Weitling =

Lutheran theologian, historian, and author

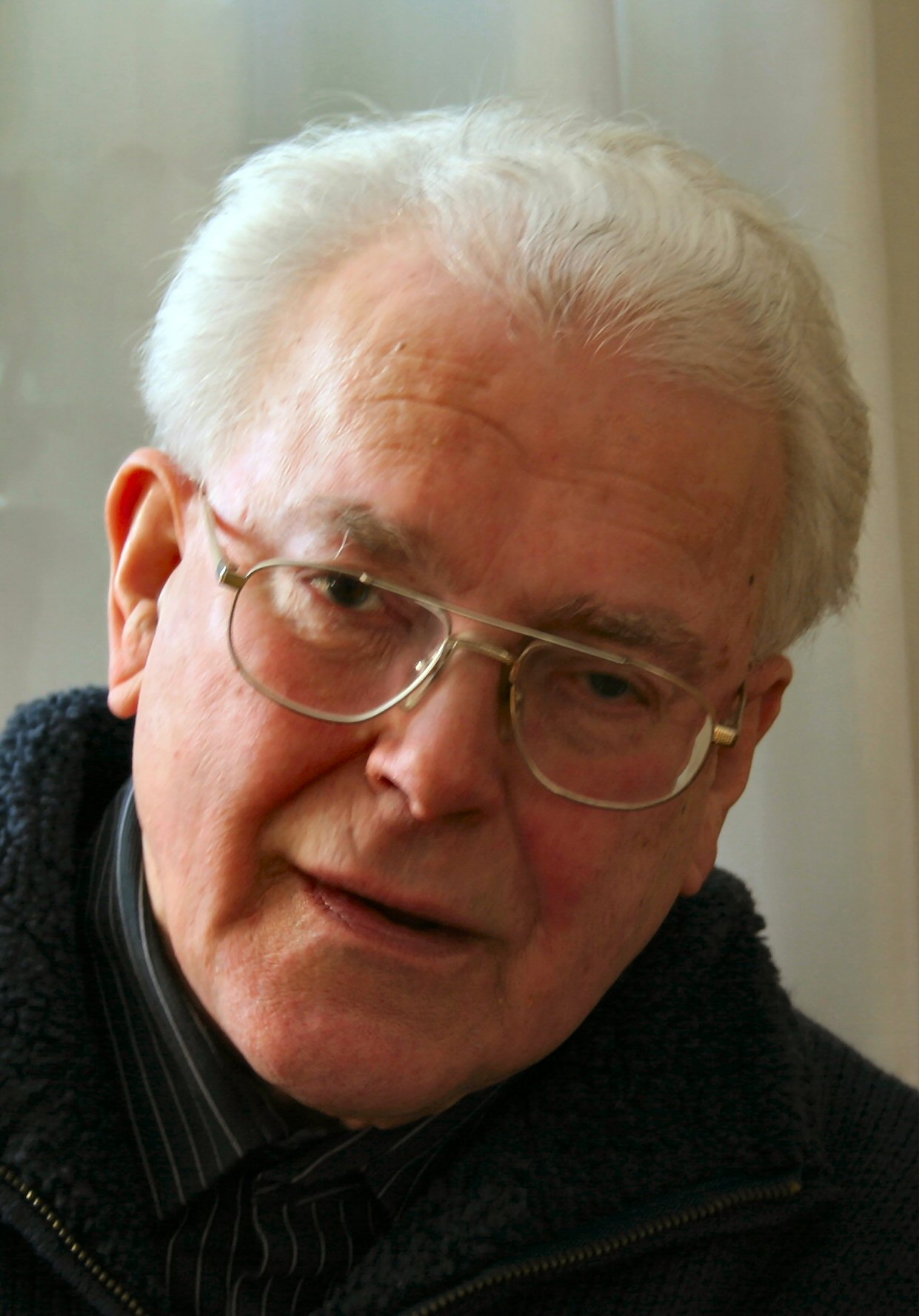
Dr. Günter Weitling in 2009

Günter Weitling (1935-2024) was a Lutheran theologian, historian, and author.

Weitling was born in Haderslev, Haderslev County, Denmark. After graduating from Haderslev Katedralskole in 1955, he studied Theology and Eastern Studies at the Universities of Bethel/Bielefeld, Mainz, Kiel, and Copenhagen. This was followed by a study of pedagogy in Breklum and stay at the Seminary in Preetz. He then served as a Lutheran pastor from 1962 to 1963 in Jörl (a district of Schleswig-Flensburg), from 1963 to 1965 in Sønderborg, and from 1965 to 1970 at the Højdevangskirke in Copenhagen. At the same time, he completed a clerkship at the gymnasium of Tårnby in religion, history and archaeology. In 1970 he received his doctorate from the University of Kiel. From 1970 to 1987, he worked as inspector at the Danish gymnasium in Sønderborg. From 1987 until his retirement in 2000 he was pastor of the Danish Church of Denmark. At the same time, he worked as a lecturer at the Institute for the History of the Church and Ecclesiastical Archaeology at the University of Kiel. Weitling founded the Deutsches Museum in Northern Schleswig and from 1986 to 2003 was its Scientific Director.

Weitling wrote and edited a large number of books and treatises, dealing mainly with the history of the Church and the history of the German minority in Northern Schleswig. In 2000 he was awarded the Order of Merit of the Federal Republic of Germany (German: Bundesverdienstkreuz) 1st Class, Germany's highest civilian honour.

Weitling died in 2024, aged 89.

== Notable publications ==
- 1971: Die historischen Voraussetzungen des „Kirchlichen Vereins für Indre Mission in Nordschleswig“ und dessen Verbindung zur reichsdänischen Indre Mission bis zur Jahrhundertwende. Schriftenreihe I des Vereins für Schleswig-holsteinische Kirchengeschichte SHKG, Band 23, Flensburg
- 1990: Die Heimdeutschen - Ursprung, Geschichte und Wesen. Hrsg. vom Bund Deutscher Nordschleswiger und Deutschen Museum Nordschleswig. Apenrade und Sonderburg, ISBN 87-983617-0-8
- 1998: Die Geschichte der Kirche in Ost-Jeypore 1924-1964. Beziehungen der Breklumer Mission zu Nordschleswig und Dänemark. Schriftenreihe des Nordelbischen Missionszentrums, Mission - Ökumene - Weltverantwortung, Band 2, Hamburg
- 2005: Fra Ansgar til Kaftan, Sydslesvig i dansk kirkehistorie 800-1920. Studieafdelingen ved Dansk Centralbibliotek for Sydslesvig, Nr. 51, Flensburg
- 2007: Deutsches Kirchenleben in Nordschleswig seit der Volksabstimmung 1920. Bund Deutscher Nordschleswiger und Archiv/Historische Forschungsstelle der deutschen Volksgruppe in Nordschleswig
