= Klappholz =

Klappholz Klapholt
- Municipality
- Coat of arms

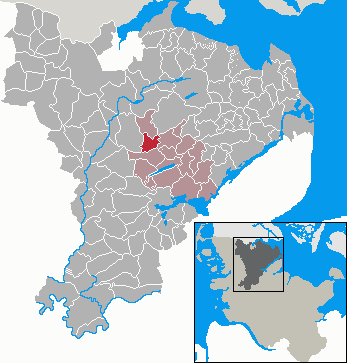
- Location of Klappholz; Klapholt within Schleswig-Flensburg district
- Interactive map of Klappholz; Klapholt
- Location within Germany Location within Schleswig-Holstein
- Coordinates: 54°37′10″N 9°32′20″E
- Country: Germany
- State: Schleswig-Holstein
- District: Schleswig-Flensburg
- Municipal assoc.: Südangeln

Government
  - Mayor: Eielt Janssen

Area
  - Total: 8.22 km^{2} (3.17 sq mi)
- Elevation: 52 m (171 ft)

Population (2025-12-31)
  - Total: 494
  - Density: 60.1/km^{2} (156/sq mi)
- Time zone: UTC+01:00 (CET)
  - Summer (DST): UTC+02:00 (CEST)
- Postal codes: 24860
- Dialling codes: 04603
- Vehicle registration: SL
- Website: www.amt- suedangeln.de

Klappholz (Danish: Klapholt) is a municipality in the district of Schleswig-Flensburg, in Schleswig-Holstein, Germany.
