= Eggebek (Amt) =

- Amt
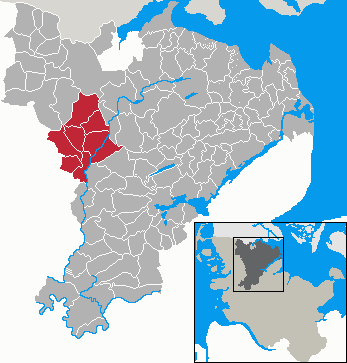
- Map of Schleswig-Flensburg highlighting Eggebek
- Interactive map of Eggebek
- Location within Germany Location within Schleswig-Holstein
- Coordinates: 54°38′N 9°20′E
- Country: Germany
- State: Schleswig-Holstein
- District: Schleswig-Flensburg
- Seat: Eggebek
- Subdivisions: 8 municipalities

Area
  - Total: 131.8 km^{2} (50.9 sq mi)

Population (2025-12-31)
  - Total: 9,300
  - Density: 71/km^{2} (180/sq mi)
- Time zone: UTC+01:00 (CET)
  - Summer (DST): UTC+02:00 (CEST)
- Vehicle registration: SL
- Website: www.amt-eggebek.de

Eggebek is an Amt ("collective municipality") in the district of Schleswig-Flensburg, in Schleswig-Holstein, Germany. The seat of the Amt is in Eggebek.

The Amt Eggebek consists of the following municipalities:

1. Eggebek
2. Janneby
3. Jerrishoe
4. Jörl
5. Langstedt
6. Sollerup
7. Süderhackstedt
8. Wanderup
