= Wanderup =

Wanderup Vanderup
- Municipality
- Coat of arms

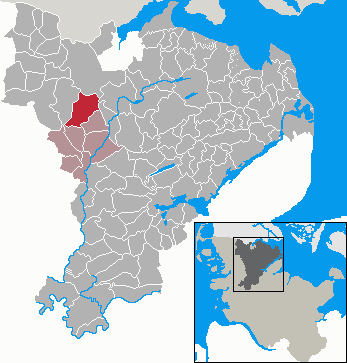
- Location of Wanderup; Vanderup within Schleswig-Flensburg district
- Interactive map of Wanderup; Vanderup
- Location within Germany Location within Schleswig-Holstein
- Coordinates: 54°40′N 9°19′E
- Country: Germany
- State: Schleswig-Holstein
- District: Schleswig-Flensburg
- Municipal assoc.: Eggebek

Government
  - Mayor: Ulrike Carstens

Area
  - Total: 28.64 km^{2} (11.06 sq mi)
- Elevation: 24 m (79 ft)

Population (2025-12-31)
  - Total: 2,711
  - Density: 94.66/km^{2} (245.2/sq mi)
- Time zone: UTC+01:00 (CET)
  - Summer (DST): UTC+02:00 (CEST)
- Postal codes: 24997
- Dialling codes: 04606
- Vehicle registration: SL
- Website: www.amt-eggebek.de

Wanderup (Danish: Vanderup) is a municipality in the district of Schleswig-Flensburg, in Schleswig-Holstein, Germany.

== Geography ==
The terrain around Vanderup is a relatively flat and dry moorland with sandy soils. The landscape is dominated by agriculture with sparse forest areas. East of the village, Jerrisbækken runs south along Jerrishøj Forest towards the villages of Sollerup and Hønning (Hynding), where the stream flows into the Trenen . Jerrisbækken flows into the small Ellebæk ( Ellbek ). On one stretch, the river forms the border with Jerrishøj Municipality and Eggebæk Parish . Southwest of Kragsted lies Kragsted Mose. Flensburg-Husum Chausee (B 200) passes the municipality and the parish.

Besides Vanderup itself, the municipality includes Birkvang ( Birkwang ), Frøsig( Friesik ), Grønbjerg ( Grünberg ), Julianehøj ( Julianenhöh ), Kellerholm, Kærager or in older Danish Kjærager ( Kieracker ), Kragsted ( Kragstedt ), Sønderby ( Sünneby ), Østerkær ( Osterkjer ) and Vesterkær ( Westerkjer ).

== History ==
Vanderup is first mentioned in 1377 (Dipl. Flensb.). The prefix is derived from the personal name *Wambi, a derivation from Old Norse vǫmb (col. older Danish vom ) meaning stomach . It is the same place name as Vamdrup near Kolding . The name can also be attributed to water. In the past there were several large bogs in the area (eg Kragsted Mose). Navnet kan også henføres til vand. Tidligere var der flere store moser i omegnen (f.eks. Kragsted Mose).

The place name Birkvang was first documented in 1854. The Birkvang development dates back to a half-farm moved from Vanderup. The prefix of the place name is derived from the tree name birch. The place name thus denotes a field or enclosure (vang) overgrown with birch trees . The place name Frøsig is first documented in 1801. The prefix is presumably derived from frøkorn. Kragsted is first mentioned in 1472. The prefix is either derived from a man's name glda. kraki (oldn. kraki ) or the bird name gada. and old krāka for crow .

Vanderup Church is from the 13th century, built of boulders with a thatched roof without a tower and with a belfry to the west. In Catholic times it was a chapel belonging to Store Vi Parish . Before 1864, the church language was mixed Danish-German, the school language was Danish.

The eastern colonist towns partly belonged to Ugle Herred, individual farms in Vanderup under Slevig Domkapital or Flensburg hospital. A farm in Kærager belonged to Lindeved, one in the 16th century under Satrupholm and later under Langsted.

== Education ==
- Fahrschule Simonsen Außenstelle Wanderup
- Grundschule Wanderup
- DRK-Kindertagesstätte Süderweg Wanderup
- Vanderup Danske Skole
