= Südangeln =

Municipality in Schleswig-Holstein, Germany

- Amt
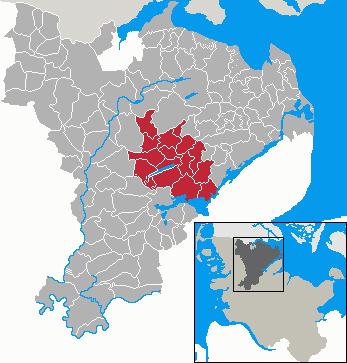
- Map of Schleswig-Flensburg highlighting Südangeln
- Interactive map of Südangeln
- Location within Germany Location within Schleswig-Holstein
- Coordinates: 54°36′N 9°34′E
- Country: Germany
- State: Schleswig-Holstein
- District: Schleswig-Flensburg
- Seat: Böklund
- Subdivisions: 15 municipalities

Area
  - Total: 189.52 km^{2} (73.17 sq mi)

Population (2025-12-31)
  - Total: 13,457
  - Density: 71.006/km^{2} (183.90/sq mi)
- Time zone: UTC+01:00 (CET)
  - Summer (DST): UTC+02:00 (CEST)
- Vehicle registration: SL
- Website: www.amt-suedangeln.de

Südangeln is an Amt ("collective municipality") in the district of Schleswig-Flensburg, in Schleswig-Holstein, Germany. The seat of the Amt is in Böklund.

The Amt Südangeln consists of the following municipalities:

1. Böklund
2. Brodersby-Goltoft
3. Havetoft
4. Idstedt
5. Klappholz
6. Neuberend
7. Nübel
8. Schaalby
9. Stolk
10. Struxdorf
11. Süderfahrenstedt
12. Taarstedt
13. Tolk
14. Twedt
15. Uelsby
