= Janneby =

- Municipality
- Coat of arms

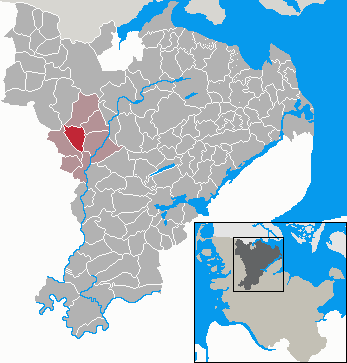
- Location of Janneby within Schleswig-Flensburg district
- Interactive map of Janneby
- Location within Germany Location within Schleswig-Holstein
- Coordinates: 54°37′N 9°18′E
- Country: Germany
- State: Schleswig-Holstein
- District: Schleswig-Flensburg
- Municipal assoc.: Eggebek
- Subdivisions: 3 Ortsteile

Government
  - Mayor: Ute Richter

Area
  - Total: 14.49 km^{2} (5.59 sq mi)
- Elevation: 17 m (56 ft)

Population (2025-12-31)
  - Total: 406
  - Density: 28.0/km^{2} (72.6/sq mi)
- Time zone: UTC+01:00 (CET)
  - Summer (DST): UTC+02:00 (CEST)
- Postal codes: 24992
- Dialling codes: 04607
- Vehicle registration: SL
- Website: www.amt-eggebek.de

Janneby is a municipality in the district of Schleswig-Flensburg, in Schleswig-Holstein, Germany.
