= Langstedt =

Landstedt Langsted
- Municipality
- Coat of arms

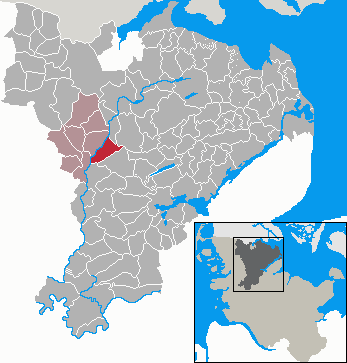
- Location of Landstedt; Langsted within Schleswig-Flensburg district
- Interactive map of Landstedt; Langsted
- Location within Germany Location within Schleswig-Holstein
- Coordinates: 54°37′6″N 9°23′13″E
- Country: Germany
- State: Schleswig-Holstein
- District: Schleswig-Flensburg
- Municipal assoc.: Eggebek

Government
  - Mayor: Jacob Bundtzen

Area
  - Total: 13.19 km^{2} (5.09 sq mi)
- Elevation: 16 m (52 ft)

Population (2025-12-31)
  - Total: 1,023
  - Density: 77.56/km^{2} (200.9/sq mi)
- Time zone: UTC+01:00 (CET)
  - Summer (DST): UTC+02:00 (CEST)
- Postal codes: 24852
- Dialling codes: 04609
- Vehicle registration: SL
- Website: www.amt-eggebek.de

Langstedt (Danish: Langsted) is a municipality in the district of Schleswig-Flensburg, in Schleswig-Holstein, Germany.

Langstedt located about 18 km south of Flensburg and 15 km northwest of Schleswig in Schleswig's rural surroundings on the Schleswigschen Geest at Treene. The northern part of the more than 300 acres Büsch Auer Forst belongs to the municipality of Langstedt.
