= Tolk =

- Municipality
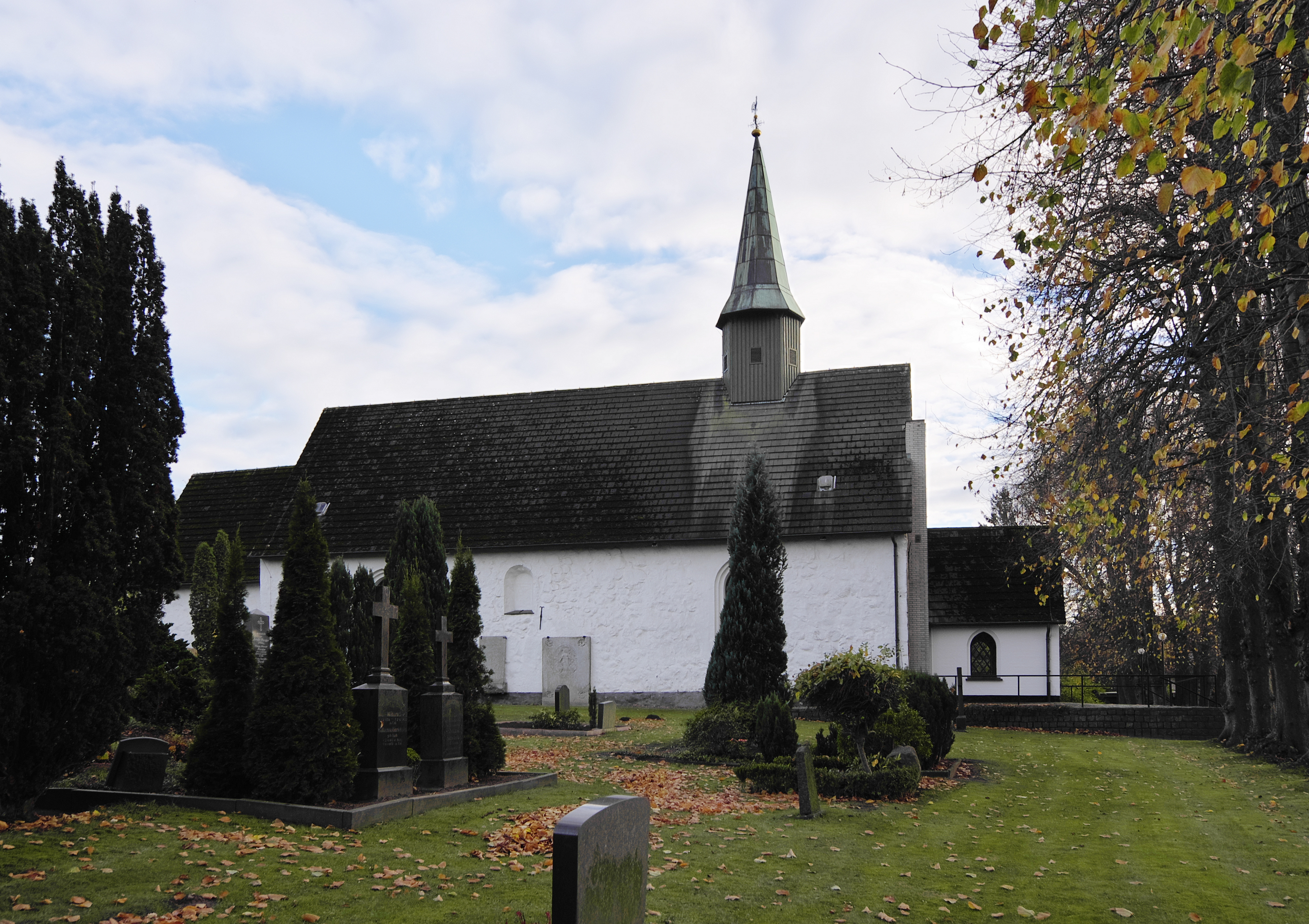
- Marienkirche in Tolk

- Coat of arms

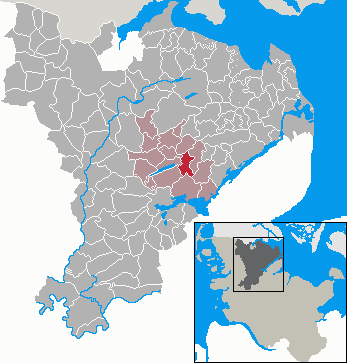
- Location of Tolk within Schleswig-Flensburg district
- Interactive map of Tolk
- Location within Germany Location within Schleswig-Holstein
- Coordinates: 54°34′N 9°39′E
- Country: Germany
- State: Schleswig-Holstein
- District: Schleswig-Flensburg
- Municipal assoc.: Südangeln

Government
  - Mayor: Andreas Thiessen

Area
  - Total: 10.5 km^{2} (4.1 sq mi)
- Elevation: 16 m (52 ft)

Population (2025-12-31)
  - Total: 1,050
  - Density: 100/km^{2} (259/sq mi)
- Time zone: UTC+01:00 (CET)
  - Summer (DST): UTC+02:00 (CEST)
- Postal codes: 24894
- Dialling codes: 04622
- Vehicle registration: SL
- Website: www.amt-suedangeln.de

Tolk is a municipality in the district of Schleswig-Flensburg, in Schleswig-Holstein, Germany. It is situated approximately 8 km northeast of Schleswig, and 26 km southeast of Flensburg.

Until 2007, Tolk was the seat of the Amt ("collective municipality") Tolk, which consisted of the following municipalities (population in 2005 between brackets):

- Brodersby (520)
- Goltoft (235)
- Nübel (1381)
- Schaalby (1700)
- Taarstedt (895)
- Tolk (2050)
- Twedt (505)
