= Süderhackstedt =

Süderhackstedt Sønder Haksted
- Municipality
- Coat of arms

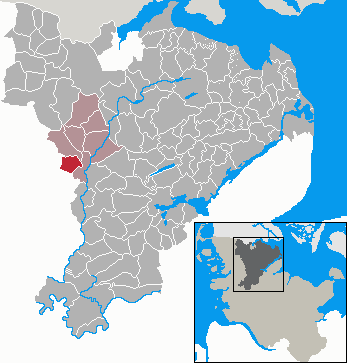
- Location of Süderhackstedt; Sønder Haksted within Schleswig-Flensburg district
- Interactive map of Süderhackstedt; Sønder Haksted
- Location within Germany Location within Schleswig-Holstein
- Coordinates: 54°36′N 9°16′E
- Country: Germany
- State: Schleswig-Holstein
- District: Schleswig-Flensburg
- Municipal assoc.: Eggebek

Government
  - Mayor: Carsten Seemann

Area
  - Total: 10.15 km^{2} (3.92 sq mi)
- Elevation: 13 m (43 ft)

Population (2025-12-31)
  - Total: 359
  - Density: 35.4/km^{2} (91.6/sq mi)
- Time zone: UTC+01:00 (CET)
  - Summer (DST): UTC+02:00 (CEST)
- Postal codes: 24852
- Dialling codes: 04607
- Vehicle registration: SL
- Website: www.amt-eggebek.de

Süderhackstedt (Danish: Sønder Haksted) is a municipality in the district of Schleswig-Flensburg, in Schleswig-Holstein, Germany.
