= Süderfahrenstedt =

Süderfahrenstedt Sønder Farensted
- Municipality
- Coat of arms

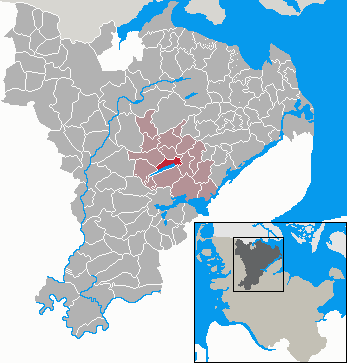
- Location of Süderfahrenstedt; Sønder Farensted within Schleswig-Flensburg district
- Interactive map of Süderfahrenstedt; Sønder Farensted
- Location within Germany Location within Schleswig-Holstein
- Coordinates: 54°34′N 9°34′E
- Country: Germany
- State: Schleswig-Holstein
- District: Schleswig-Flensburg
- Municipal assoc.: Südangeln

Government
  - Mayor: Heinrich Mattsen

Area
  - Total: 9.08 km^{2} (3.51 sq mi)
- Elevation: 31 m (102 ft)

Population (2025-12-31)
  - Total: 472
  - Density: 52.0/km^{2} (135/sq mi)
- Time zone: UTC+01:00 (CET)
  - Summer (DST): UTC+02:00 (CEST)
- Postal codes: 24890
- Dialling codes: 04623
- Vehicle registration: SL
- Website: www.amt- suedangeln.de

Süderfahrenstedt (Danish: Sønder Farensted) is a municipality in the district of Schleswig-Flensburg, in Schleswig-Holstein, Germany.
