= Gøtueiði =

- Village
- Location in the Faroe Islands
- Coordinates: 62°10′30″N 6°46′19″W
- State: Kingdom of Denmark
- Constituent country: Faroe Islands
- Island: Eysturoy
- Municipality: Eystur
- Founded: 1850

Population
  - Total: 39
- Time zone: GMT
  - Summer (DST): UTC+1 (EST)
- Postal code: FO 666
- Climate: Cfc

Gøtueiði (Danish: Gøteejde) a town in the Faroe Islands, located deep in the Skalafjordur-inlet on Eysturoy, founded in 1850.

The village has now grown towards its neighbour-village Skipanes. During the 1980s there were religious tent-meetings in Gøtueiði.

Gotueidi consists of the villages/settlements Norðragøta (Northern Gøta), Syðrugøta (Southern Gøta), Gøtugjógv (Gøta's cleft) and Gøtueiði (Gøta's isthmus). They form part of the Eystur municipality.

== See also ==
- List of towns in the Faroe Islands
