= Norðragøta =

- Village
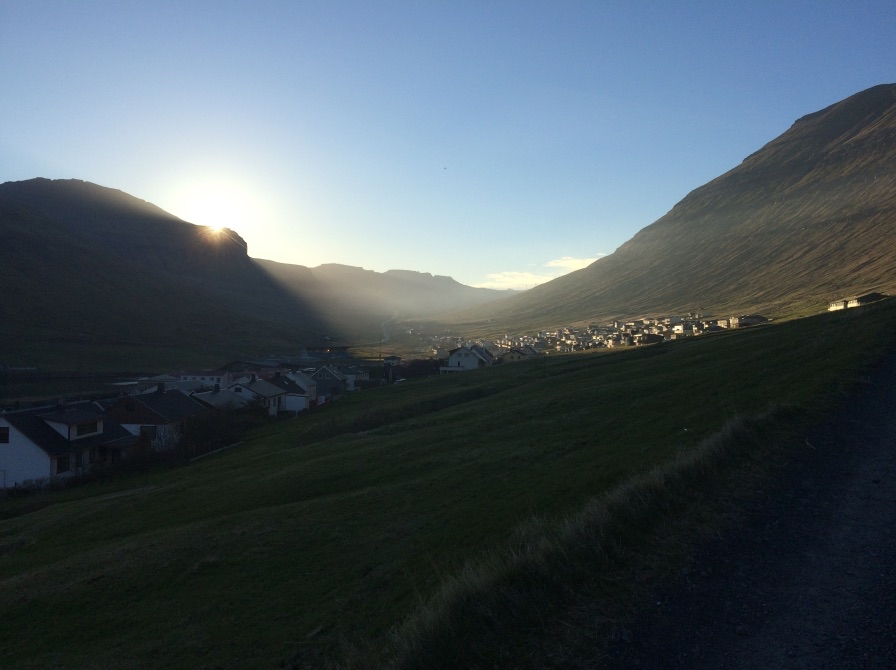
- Norðragøta in 2016

- Location in the Faroe Islands
- Coordinates: 62°12′3″N 6°44′27″W
- State: Kingdom of Denmark
- Constituent country: Faroe Islands
- Island: Eysturoy
- Municipality: Eysturkommuna

Population (September 2025)
  - Total: 651
- Time zone: GMT
  - Summer (DST): UTC+1 (EST)
- Postal code: FO 512
- Climate: Cfc

Norðragøta (Danish: Nordregøte), also just referred to as Gøta, is a village on Eysturoy island, Faroe Islands.

== Overview ==
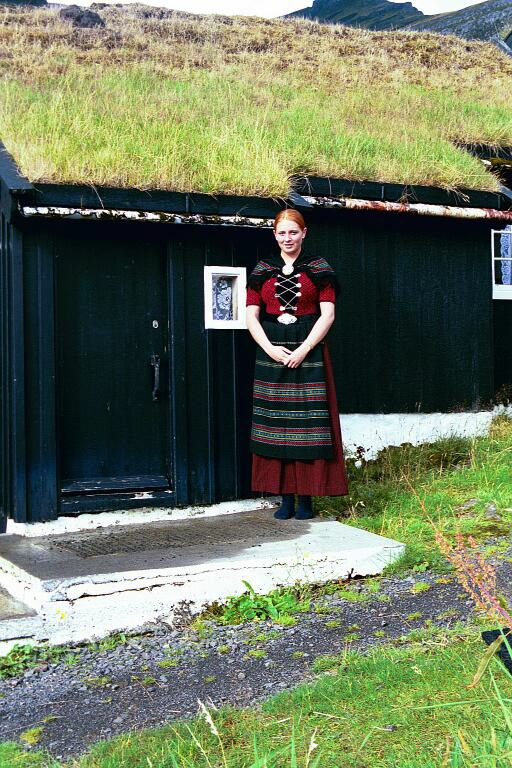
The famous Faroese singer Eivør Pálsdóttir posing in national costume in front of the museum Blásastova in Gøta.

The municipality of Gøta (Gøtu kommuna) was a municipality until 1 January 2009 when it merged with Leirvík into Eysturkommuna. Gøta consists also of the villages Gøtueiði, Gøtugjógv and Syðrugøta. The village lies on Eysturoy's east coast at the bottom of the inlet Gøtuvík. There is a museum called Gøtu Fornminnisavn with the famous house Blásastova. The wooden church in the centre of the village is from 1833.

Gøta is a place of great importance in the history of the Faroe Islands. One of the key figures in the Icelandic saga, Færeyinga saga, called Tróndur í Gøtu (Old Norse: Þrǫ́ndr í Gǫtu) lived here. Tróndur was a heathen Viking-chief who ruled all of the islands for a period of time. In the narrative, Tróndur is depicted as the antagonist, juxtaposed against the protagonist, Sigmundur Brestisson. Sigmundur played a pivotal role in the Christianization of the Faroe Islands on behalf of the King of Norway.

== Sports ==
The most popular pastime in Norðragøta is football. The local football team is Víkingur Gøta, formerly known as Gøtu Ítróttarfelag. They play their home games at the Serpugerði Stadium.

== Music ==
Gøta is home to G! Festival, one of the largest music festivals in the Faroe Islands.

== Faroese stamps showing Norðragøta ==
=== Old houses in Norðragøta ===
Issued on 5 October 1992, the artist was Jákup Pauli Gregoriussen.

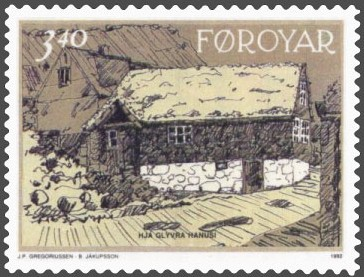
FR 231: Hjá Glyvra Hanusi

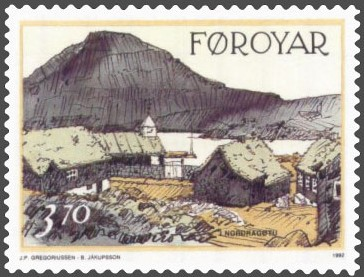
FR 232: Húsini hjá Peri

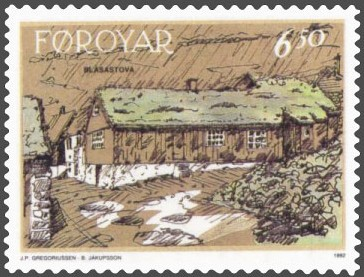
FR 233: Blásastova (today a museum)

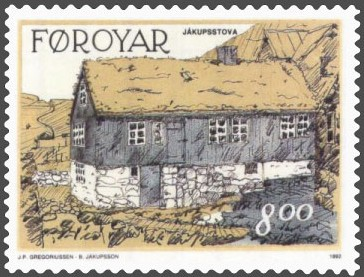
FR 234: Jákupsstova
- Text for the stamp edition on stamps.fo: Old Houses in Noðragøta
- Note the web site of the museum: Blasastova.fo

=== Church of Gøta ===
The new church of Gøta, issued: 23 September 2002. These were also the Christmas stamps for that year.

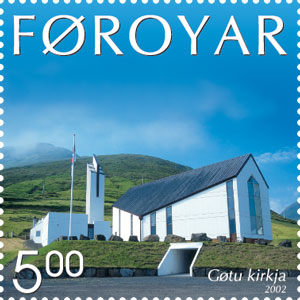
FO 425: Gøtu kirkja

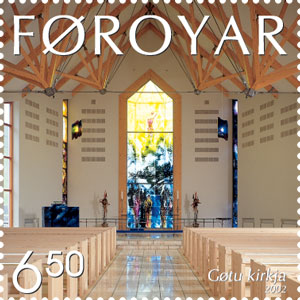
FO 426: Inside the church. Interior art by Tróndur Patursson

Text on stamps.fo:

- Gøta Church

== See also ==
- List of towns in the Faroe Islands
