= Sollerup =

- Municipality
- Coat of arms

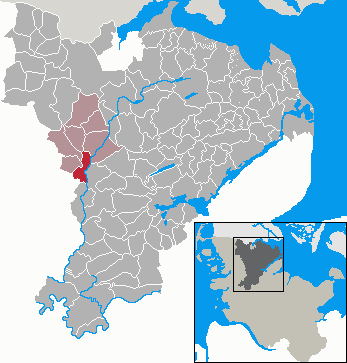
- Location of Sollerup within Schleswig-Flensburg district
- Interactive map of Sollerup
- Location within Germany Location within Schleswig-Holstein
- Coordinates: 54°34′N 9°19′E
- Country: Germany
- State: Schleswig-Holstein
- District: Schleswig-Flensburg
- Municipal assoc.: Eggebek

Government
  - Mayor: Hans-Peter Nissen

Area
  - Total: 12.98 km^{2} (5.01 sq mi)
- Elevation: 9 m (30 ft)

Population (2025-12-31)
  - Total: 456
  - Density: 35.1/km^{2} (91.0/sq mi)
- Time zone: UTC+01:00 (CET)
  - Summer (DST): UTC+02:00 (CEST)
- Postal codes: 24852
- Dialling codes: 04625, 04609, 04607
- Vehicle registration: SL
- Website: www.amt-eggebek.de

Sollerup is a municipality in the district of Schleswig-Flensburg, in Schleswig-Holstein, Germany.
