= Eystur Municipality =

Coordinates: 62°06′56″N 6°43′20″W

Eystur Municipality Eystur kommuna (Faroese)
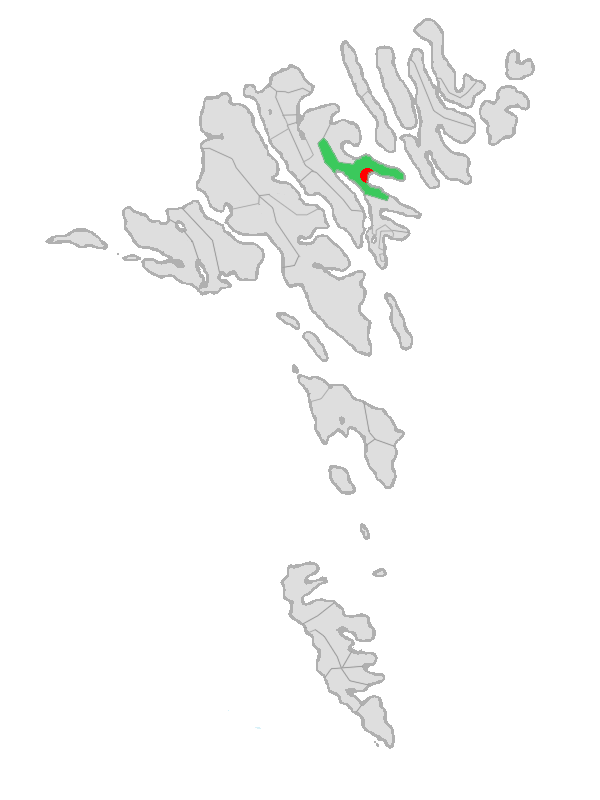
- State: Kingdom of Denmark
- Constituent country: Faroe Islands
- Island: Eysturoy

Area
  - Total: 42 km^{2} (16 sq mi)

Population (January 2024)
  - Total: 2,296
  - Density: 55/km^{2} (140/sq mi)
- Website: www.eysturkommuna.fo

Eystur Municipality (Faroese: Eystur kommuna) is a municipality of the Faroe Islands.

In Faroese, eystur means east and so the municipality is East Municipality. It covers an eastern part of the island of Eysturoy. It was created on 1 January 2009 from the merger of Leirvík and Gøta municipalities. It includes the villages of Norðragøta (the administrative centre), Leirvík, Gøtueiði, Gøtugjógv and Syðrugøta, as well as other small settlements.
