= Stolk =

- Municipality
- Coat of arms

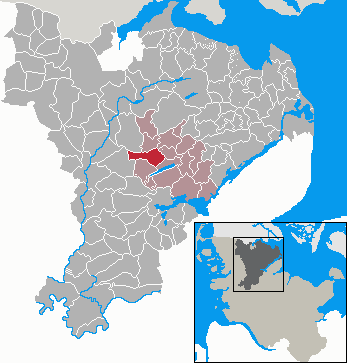
- Location of Stolk within Schleswig-Flensburg district
- Interactive map of Stolk
- Location within Germany Location within Schleswig-Holstein
- Coordinates: 54°36′N 9°33′E
- Country: Germany
- State: Schleswig-Holstein
- District: Schleswig-Flensburg
- Municipal assoc.: Südangeln

Government
  - Mayor: Heiner Paulsen

Area
  - Total: 14.54 km^{2} (5.61 sq mi)
- Elevation: 40 m (130 ft)

Population (2025-12-31)
  - Total: 871
  - Density: 59.9/km^{2} (155/sq mi)
- Time zone: UTC+01:00 (CET)
  - Summer (DST): UTC+02:00 (CEST)
- Postal codes: 24890
- Dialling codes: 04623
- Vehicle registration: SL
- Website: www.amt- suedangeln.de

Stolk (German pronunciation: [ˈʃtɔlk]) is a municipality in the district of Schleswig-Flensburg, in Schleswig-Holstein, Germany.
