= Struxdorf =

Struxdorf Strukstrup
- Municipality
- Coat of arms

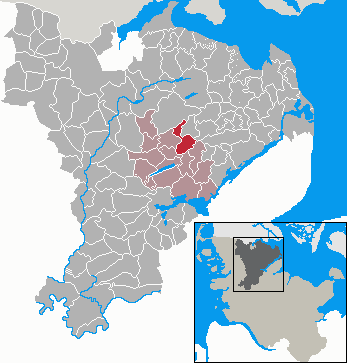
- Location of Struxdorf; Strukstrup within Schleswig-Flensburg district
- Interactive map of Struxdorf; Strukstrup
- Location within Germany Location within Schleswig-Holstein
- Coordinates: 54°37′N 9°39′E
- Country: Germany
- State: Schleswig-Holstein
- District: Schleswig-Flensburg
- Municipal assoc.: Südangeln

Government
  - Mayor: Georg Laß

Area
  - Total: 13.39 km^{2} (5.17 sq mi)
- Elevation: 19 m (62 ft)

Population (2025-12-31)
  - Total: 663
  - Density: 49.5/km^{2} (128/sq mi)
- Time zone: UTC+01:00 (CET)
  - Summer (DST): UTC+02:00 (CEST)
- Postal codes: 24891
- Dialling codes: 04623
- Vehicle registration: SL
- Website: www.amt- suedangeln.de

Struxdorf (Danish: Strukstrup) is a municipality in the district of Schleswig-Flensburg, in Schleswig-Holstein, Germany.
