= Eggebek =

Eggebek Eggebæk
- Municipality
- Coat of arms

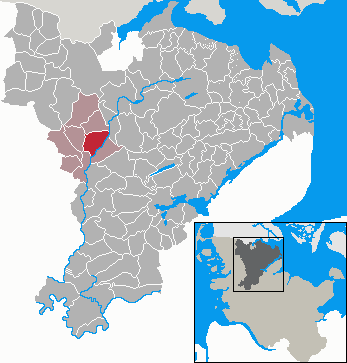
- Location of Eggebek; Eggebæk within Schleswig-Flensburg district
- Interactive map of Eggebek; Eggebæk
- Location within Germany Location within Schleswig-Holstein
- Coordinates: 54°37′N 9°22′E
- Country: Germany
- State: Schleswig-Holstein
- District: Schleswig-Flensburg
- Municipal assoc.: Eggebek

Government
  - Mayor: Reinhard Breidenbach (CDU)

Area
  - Total: 16.68 km^{2} (6.44 sq mi)
- Elevation: 16 m (52 ft)

Population (2025-12-31)
  - Total: 2,433
  - Density: 145.9/km^{2} (377.8/sq mi)
- Time zone: UTC+01:00 (CET)
  - Summer (DST): UTC+02:00 (CEST)
- Postal codes: 24852
- Dialling codes: 04609
- Vehicle registration: SL
- Website: www.amt-eggebek.de

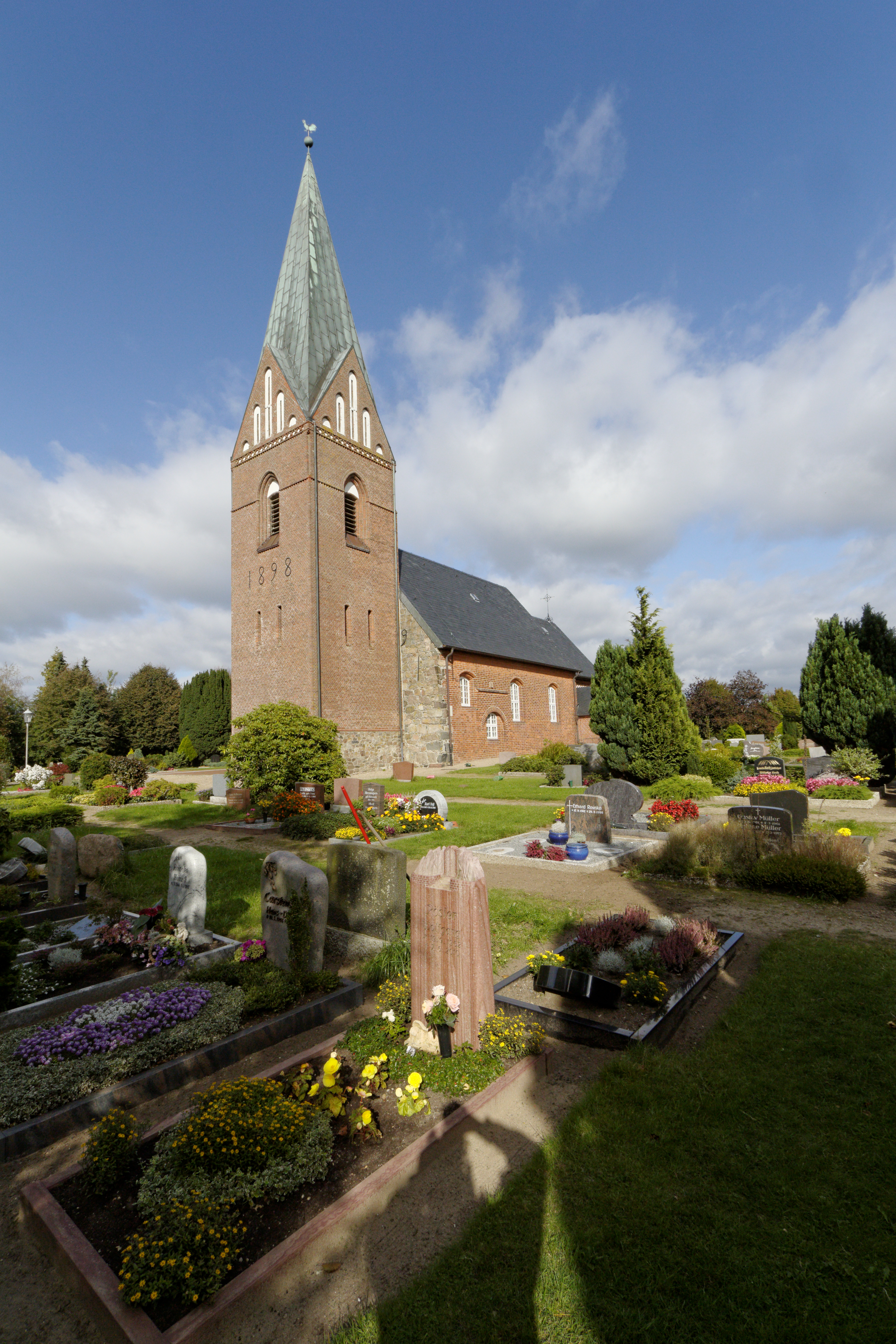

Eggebek (Danish: Eggebæk) is a municipality in the district of Schleswig-Flensburg, in Schleswig-Holstein, Germany. It is situated approximately 17 km northwest of Schleswig, and 18 km south of Flensburg.

Eggebek is the seat of the Amt ("collective municipality") Eggebek.
