= Nübel =

Nübel Nybøl
- Municipality
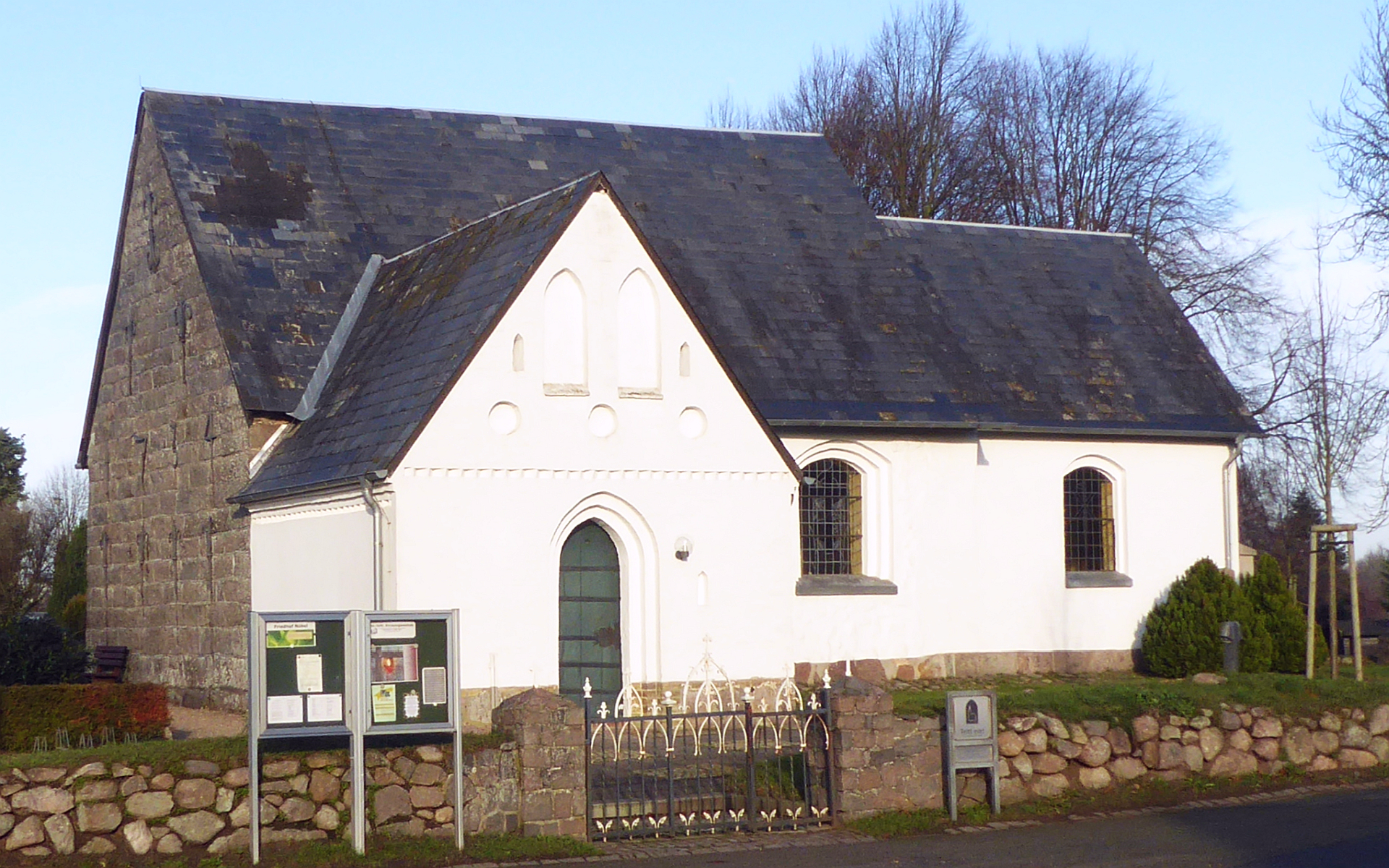
- Nübel Church

- Coat of arms

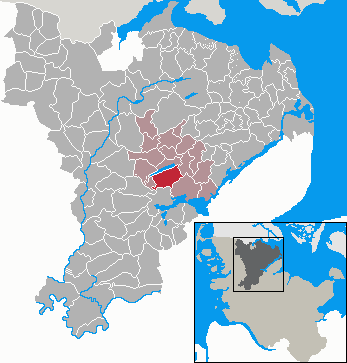
- Location of Nübel; Nybøl within Schleswig-Flensburg district
- Interactive map of Nübel; Nybøl
- Location within Germany Location within Schleswig-Holstein
- Coordinates: 54°34′N 9°34′E
- Country: Germany
- State: Schleswig-Holstein
- District: Schleswig-Flensburg
- Municipal assoc.: Südangeln

Government
  - Mayor: Jürgen Augustin

Area
  - Total: 18.34 km^{2} (7.08 sq mi)
- Elevation: 35 m (115 ft)

Population (2025-12-31)
  - Total: 1,239
  - Density: 67.56/km^{2} (175.0/sq mi)
- Time zone: UTC+01:00 (CET)
  - Summer (DST): UTC+02:00 (CEST)
- Postal codes: 24881
- Dialling codes: 04621
- Vehicle registration: SL
- Website: www.amt- suedangeln.de

Nübel (German pronunciation: [ˈnyːbl̩]; Danish: Nybøl) is a municipality in the district of Schleswig-Flensburg, in Schleswig-Holstein, Germany.
