= Brodersby-Goltoft =

- Municipality
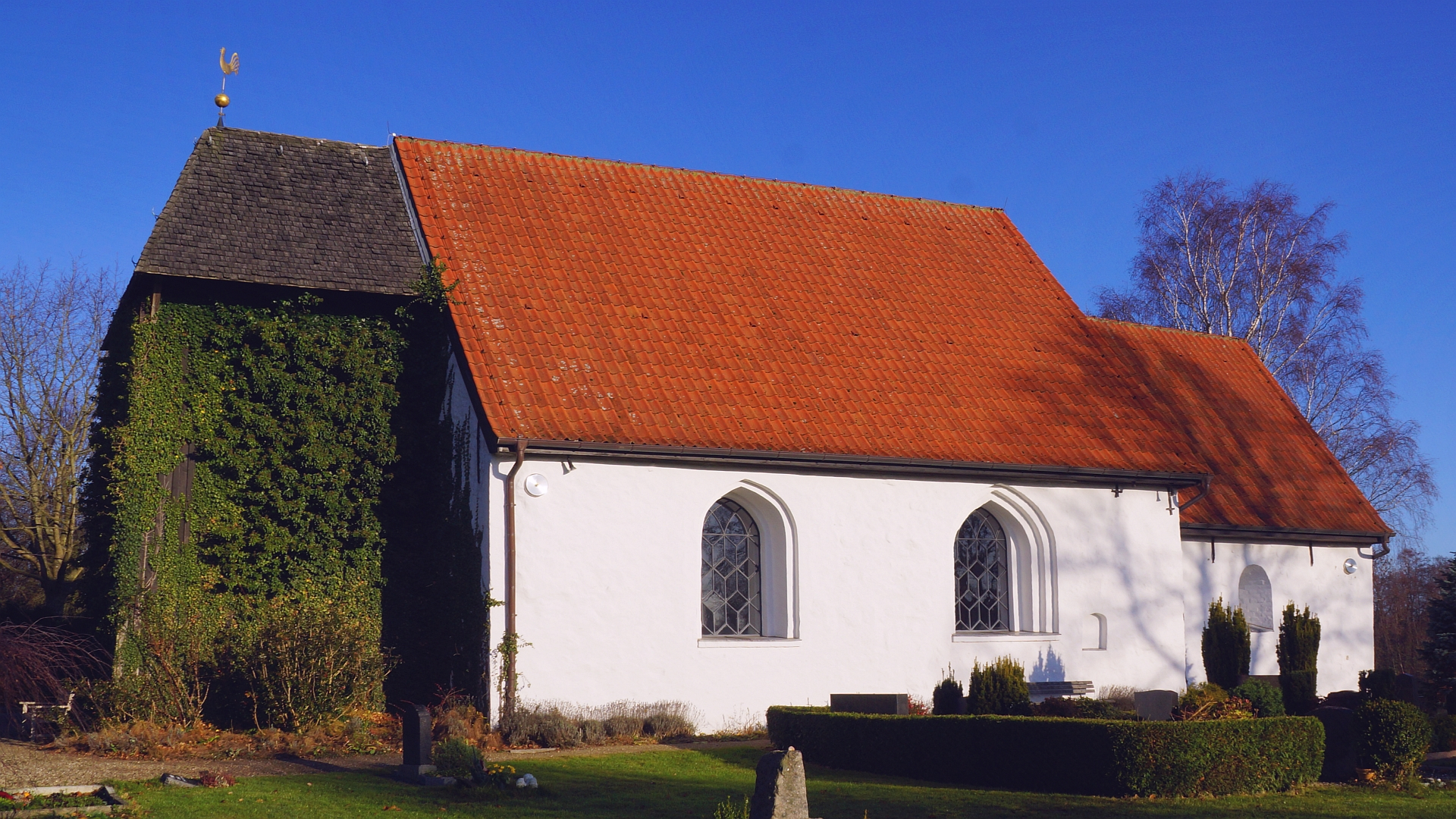
- Brodersby Church

- Coat of arms

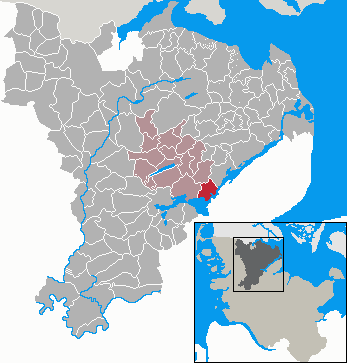
- Location of Brodersby-Goltoft within Schleswig-Flensburg district
- Interactive map of Brodersby-Goltoft
- Location within Germany Location within Schleswig-Holstein
- Coordinates: 54°31′N 9°43′E
- Country: Germany
- State: Schleswig-Holstein
- District: Schleswig-Flensburg
- Municipal assoc.: Südangeln

Government
  - Mayor: Bernd Blohm

Area
  - Total: 13.45 km^{2} (5.19 sq mi)
- Elevation: 6 m (20 ft)

Population (2025-12-31)
  - Total: 685
  - Density: 50.9/km^{2} (132/sq mi)
- Time zone: UTC+01:00 (CET)
  - Summer (DST): UTC+02:00 (CEST)
- Postal codes: 24864
- Dialling codes: 04622
- Vehicle registration: SL
- Website: www.brodersby.de

Brodersby-Goltoft (German pronunciation: [ˈbʁoːdɐsbyː ˈɡɔltɔft]) is a municipality in the district of Schleswig-Flensburg, in Schleswig-Holstein, Germany. In March 2018, the former municipality of Goltoft was merged into Brodersby, and the municipality was renamed into Brodersby-Goltoft.
