= Jörl =

Jörl Jørl or Hjørdel
- Municipality
- Coat of arms

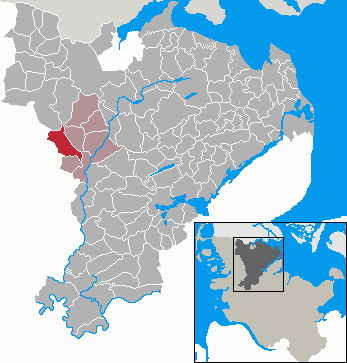
- Location of Jörl; Jørl or Hjørdel within Schleswig-Flensburg district
- Interactive map of Jörl; Jørl or Hjørdel
- Location within Germany Location within Schleswig-Holstein
- Coordinates: 54°36′N 9°18′E
- Country: Germany
- State: Schleswig-Holstein
- District: Schleswig-Flensburg
- Municipal assoc.: Eggebek

Government
  - Mayor: Hans-Jürgen Jochimsen

Area
  - Total: 19.69 km^{2} (7.60 sq mi)
- Elevation: 7 m (23 ft)

Population (2025-12-31)
  - Total: 884
  - Density: 44.9/km^{2} (116/sq mi)
- Time zone: UTC+01:00 (CET)
  - Summer (DST): UTC+02:00 (CEST)
- Postal codes: 24992
- Dialling codes: 04607
- Vehicle registration: SL
- Website: www.amt-eggebek.de

Jörl (German pronunciation: [jœʁl]; Danish: Jørl or Hjørdel) is a municipality in the district of Schleswig-Flensburg, in Schleswig-Holstein, Germany.
