= Havetoft =

- Municipality
- Coat of arms

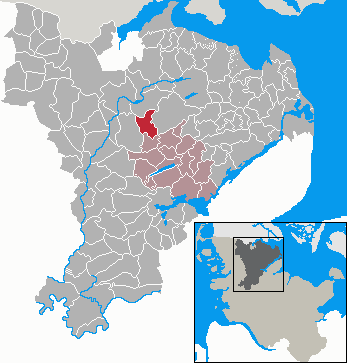
- Location of Havetoft within Schleswig-Flensburg district
- Interactive map of Havetoft
- Location within Germany Location within Schleswig-Holstein
- Coordinates: 54°38′N 9°31′E
- Country: Germany
- State: Schleswig-Holstein
- District: Schleswig-Flensburg
- Municipal assoc.: Südangeln

Government
  - Mayor: Peter Hermann Petersen

Area
  - Total: 14.53 km^{2} (5.61 sq mi)
- Elevation: 39 m (128 ft)

Population (2025-12-31)
  - Total: 979
  - Density: 67.4/km^{2} (175/sq mi)
- Time zone: UTC+01:00 (CET)
  - Summer (DST): UTC+02:00 (CEST)
- Postal codes: 24873
- Dialling codes: 04603
- Vehicle registration: SL
- Website: www.amt- suedangeln.de

Havetoft is a municipality in Schleswig-Flensburg district, in northern Germany.
