= Skarð =

Skarð may refer to:

- Skarð, Faroe Islands, an abandoned village
- Skarð, Iceland, a small farm and a church parish

== See also ==
- Skarø, an island in Denmark
- Skaro, the homeworld of the Daleks
