= Goltoft =

Village in Schleswig-Holstein, Germany

- Ortsteil of Brodersby-Goltoft
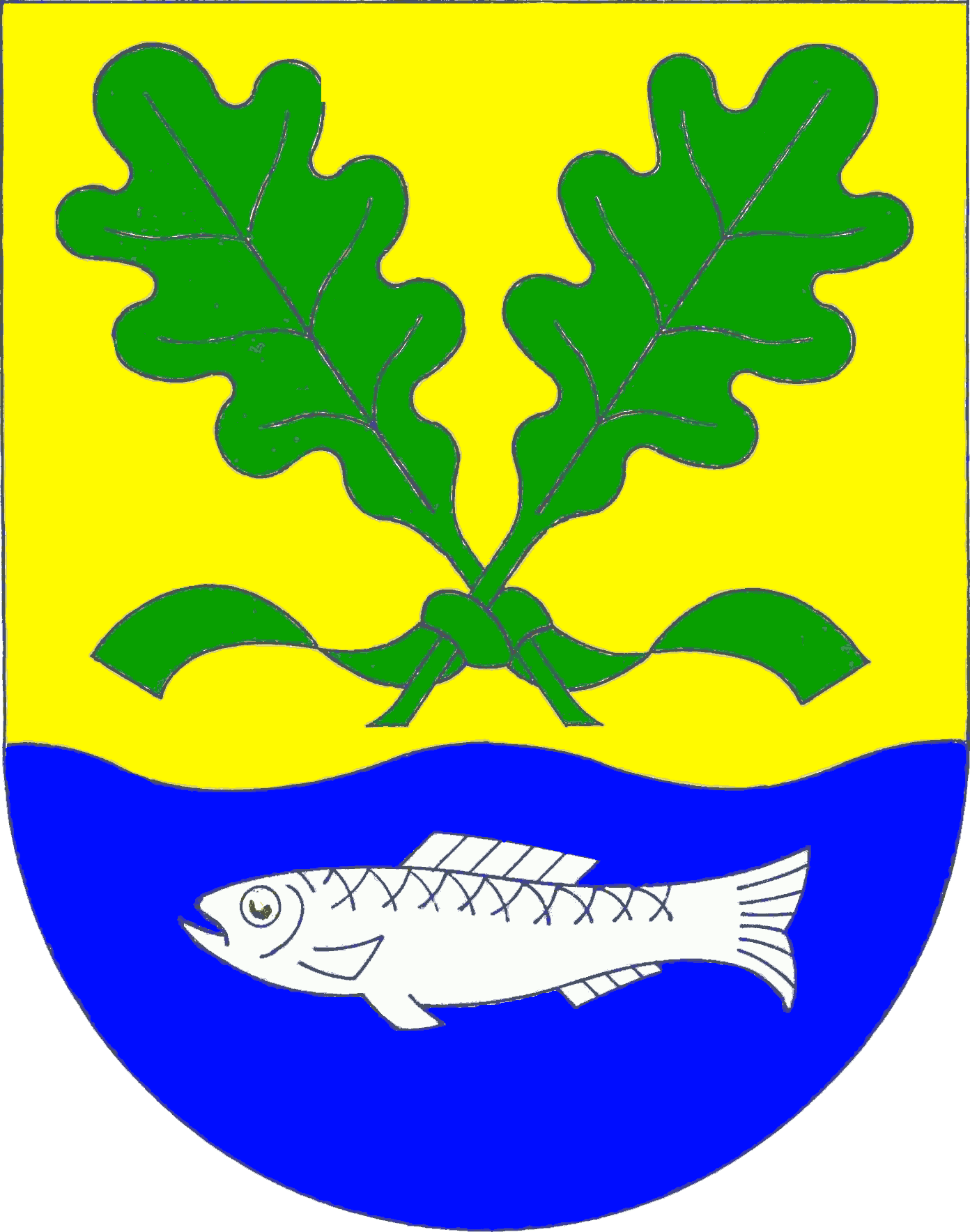
- Coat of arms
- Interactive map of Goltoft
- Location within Germany Location within Schleswig-Holstein
- Coordinates: 54°32′N 9°43′E
- Country: Germany
- State: Schleswig-Holstein
- District: Schleswig-Flensburg
- Municipality: Brodersby-Goltoft

Area
  - Total: 3.09 km^{2} (1.19 sq mi)
- Elevation: 17 m (56 ft)

Population (2016-12-31)
  - Total: 214
  - Density: 69.3/km^{2} (179/sq mi)
- Time zone: UTC+01:00 (CET)
  - Summer (DST): UTC+02:00 (CEST)
- Postal codes: 24864
- Dialling codes: 04622
- Vehicle registration: SL
- Website: www.amt- suedangeln.de

Goltoft (German pronunciation: [ˈɡɔltɔft]) is a village and a former municipality in the district of Schleswig-Flensburg, in Schleswig-Holstein, Germany. Since March 2018, it is part of the municipality Brodersby-Goltoft.
