= Twedt =

Twedt Tved
- Municipality
- Coat of arms

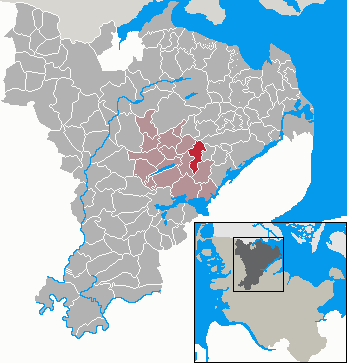
- Location of Twedt; Tved within Schleswig-Flensburg district
- Interactive map of Twedt; Tved
- Location within Germany Location within Schleswig-Holstein
- Coordinates: 54°36′N 9°40′E
- Country: Germany
- State: Schleswig-Holstein
- District: Schleswig-Flensburg
- Municipal assoc.: Südangeln

Government
  - Mayor: Heinrich-Wilhelm Horstmann

Area
  - Total: 12.52 km^{2} (4.83 sq mi)
- Elevation: 16 m (52 ft)

Population (2025-12-31)
  - Total: 475
  - Density: 37.9/km^{2} (98.3/sq mi)
- Time zone: UTC+01:00 (CET)
  - Summer (DST): UTC+02:00 (CEST)
- Postal codes: 24881 24894
- Dialling codes: 04622
- Vehicle registration: SL
- Website: www.amt- suedangeln.de

Twedt (Danish: Tved) is a municipality in the district of Schleswig-Flensburg, in Schleswig-Holstein, Germany.
