= Jerrishoe =

Jerrishoe Jerrishøj
- Municipality
- Coat of arms

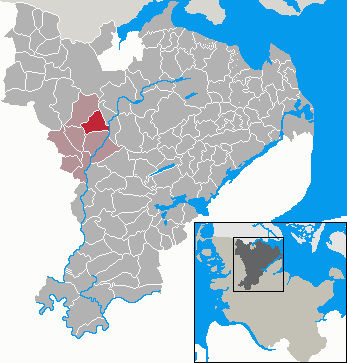
- Location of Jerrishoe; Jerrishøj within Schleswig-Flensburg district
- Interactive map of Jerrishoe; Jerrishøj
- Location within Germany Location within Schleswig-Holstein
- Coordinates: 54°39′32″N 9°22′25″E
- Country: Germany
- State: Schleswig-Holstein
- District: Schleswig-Flensburg
- Municipal assoc.: Eggebek

Government
  - Mayor: Heike Schmidt

Area
  - Total: 16.00 km^{2} (6.18 sq mi)
- Elevation: 20 m (66 ft)

Population (2025-12-31)
  - Total: 1,028
  - Density: 64.25/km^{2} (166.4/sq mi)
- Time zone: UTC+01:00 (CET)
  - Summer (DST): UTC+02:00 (CEST)
- Postal codes: 24963
- Dialling codes: 04638
- Vehicle registration: SL
- Website: www.amt-eggebek.de

Jerrishoe (Danish: Jerrishøj) is a municipality in the district of Schleswig-Flensburg, in Schleswig-Holstein, Germany.
