= Böklund =

Böklund Bøglund
- Municipality
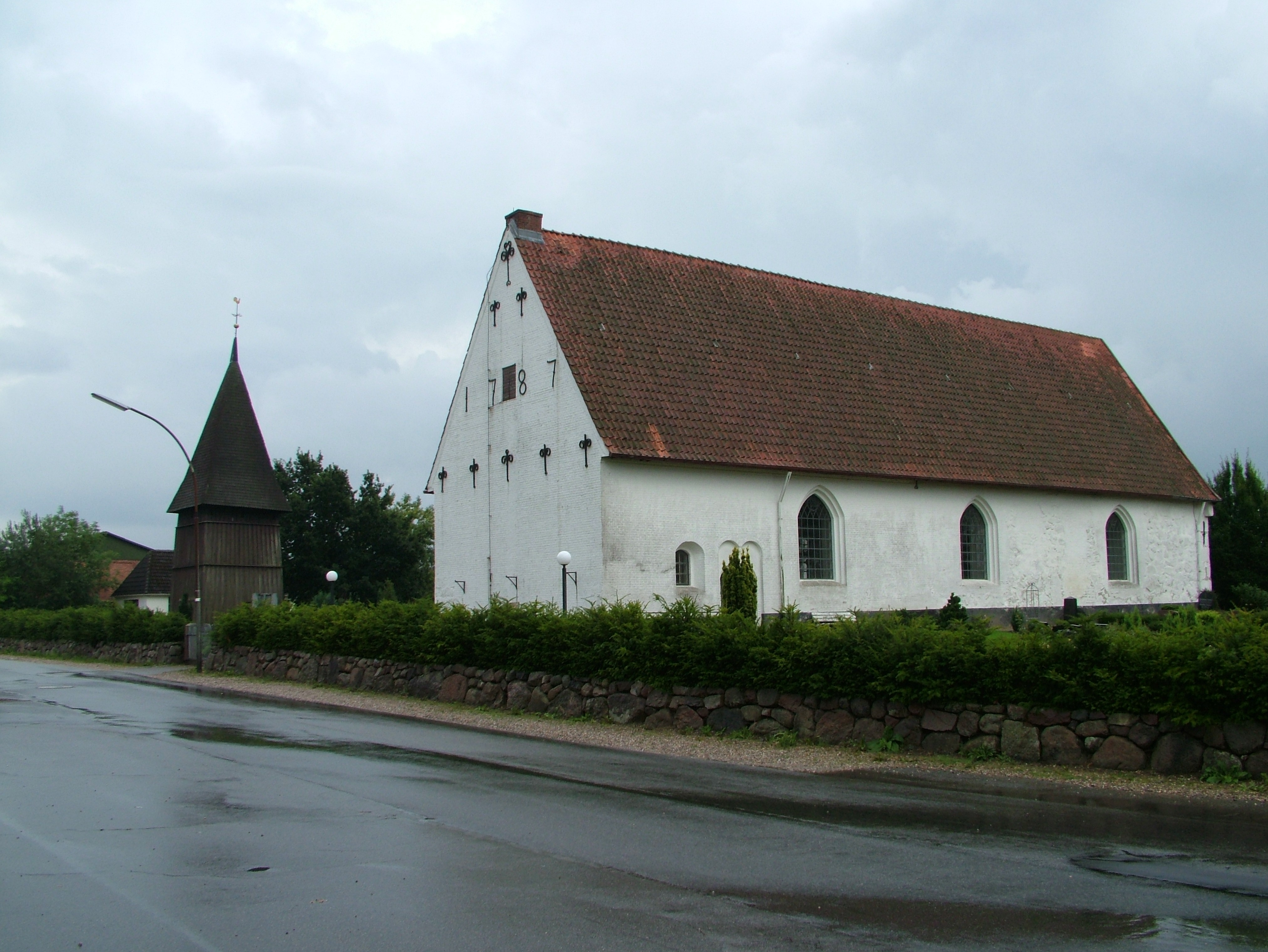
- Böklund Church

- Coat of arms

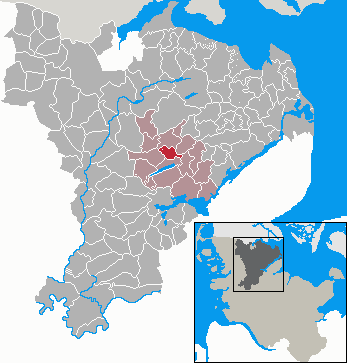
- Location of Böklund; Bøglund within Schleswig-Flensburg district
- Interactive map of Böklund; Bøglund
- Location within Germany Location within Schleswig-Holstein
- Coordinates: 54°36′N 9°34′E
- Country: Germany
- State: Schleswig-Holstein
- District: Schleswig-Flensburg
- Municipal assoc.: Südangeln

Government
  - Mayor: Jürgen Steffensen (CDU)

Area
  - Total: 7.88 km^{2} (3.04 sq mi)
- Elevation: 34 m (112 ft)

Population (2025-12-31)
  - Total: 1,658
  - Density: 210/km^{2} (545/sq mi)
- Time zone: UTC+01:00 (CET)
  - Summer (DST): UTC+02:00 (CEST)
- Postal codes: 24860
- Dialling codes: 04623
- Vehicle registration: SL
- Website: www.amt- suedangeln.de

Böklund (Danish: Bøglund) is a municipality in the district of Schleswig-Flensburg, in Schleswig-Holstein, Germany. It is situated approximately 10 km north of Schleswig, and 22 km southeast of Flensburg.

Böklund is the seat of the Amt ("collective municipality") Südangeln.
