= Neuberend =

Neuberend Ny Bjernt
- Municipality
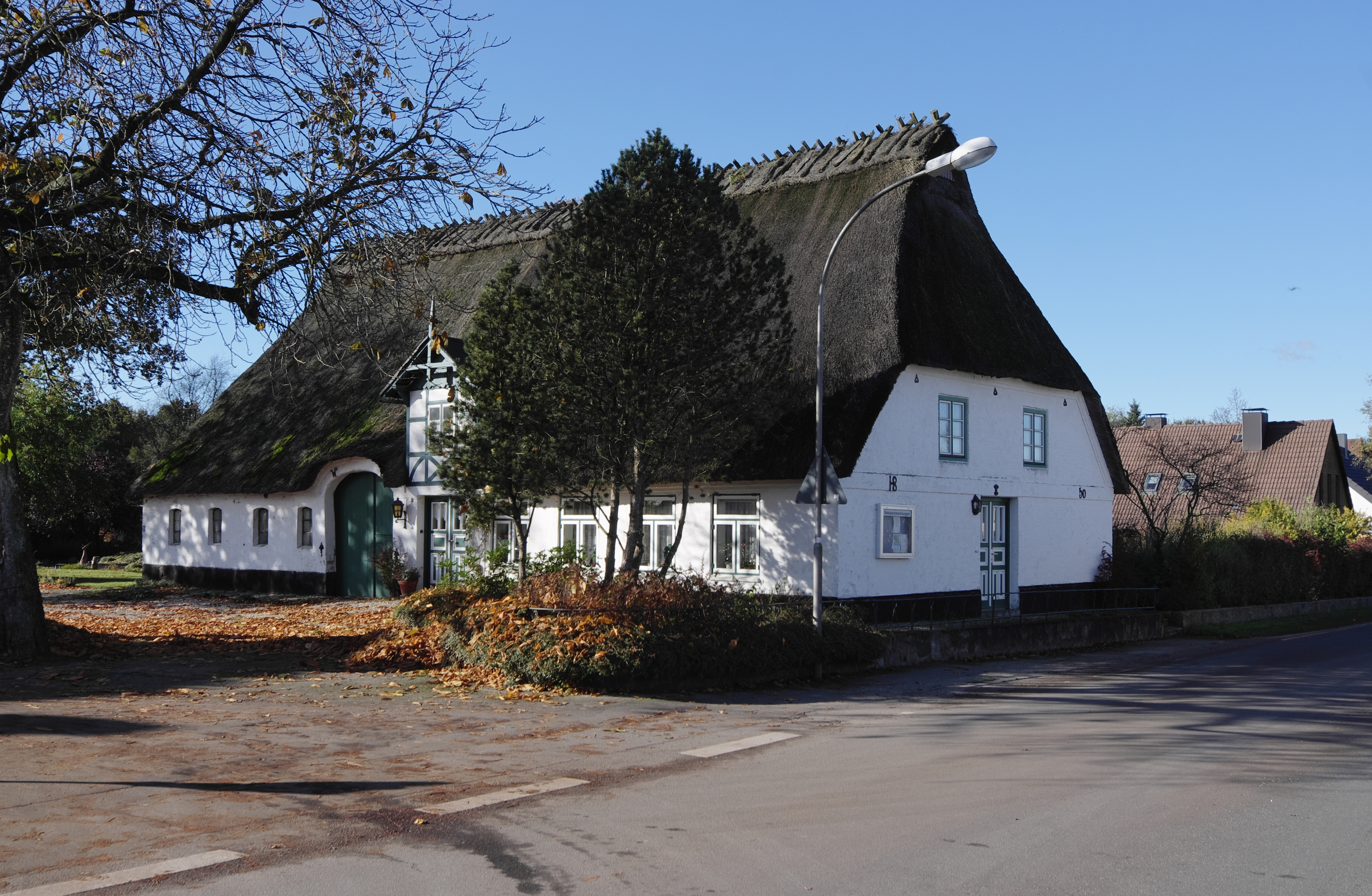

- Coat of arms

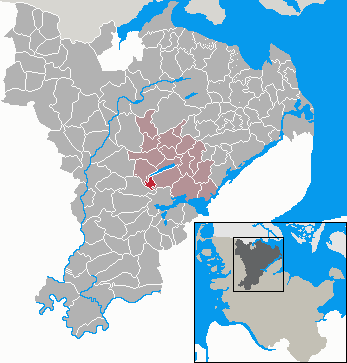
- Location of Neuberend; Ny Bjernt within Schleswig-Flensburg district
- Interactive map of Neuberend; Ny Bjernt
- Location within Germany Location within Schleswig-Holstein
- Coordinates: 54°33′10″N 9°31′46″E
- Country: Germany
- State: Schleswig-Holstein
- District: Schleswig-Flensburg
- Municipal assoc.: Südangeln

Government
  - Mayor: Hans-Helmut Guthardt

Area
  - Total: 4.42 km^{2} (1.71 sq mi)
- Elevation: 40 m (130 ft)

Population (2025-12-31)
  - Total: 1,169
  - Density: 264/km^{2} (685/sq mi)
- Time zone: UTC+01:00 (CET)
  - Summer (DST): UTC+02:00 (CEST)
- Postal codes: 24879
- Dialling codes: 04621
- Vehicle registration: SL
- Website: www.amt- suedangeln.de

Neuberend (Danish: Ny Bjernt) is a municipality in the district of Schleswig-Flensburg, in Schleswig-Holstein, Germany.
