= Taarstedt =

Taarstedt Torsted
- Municipality
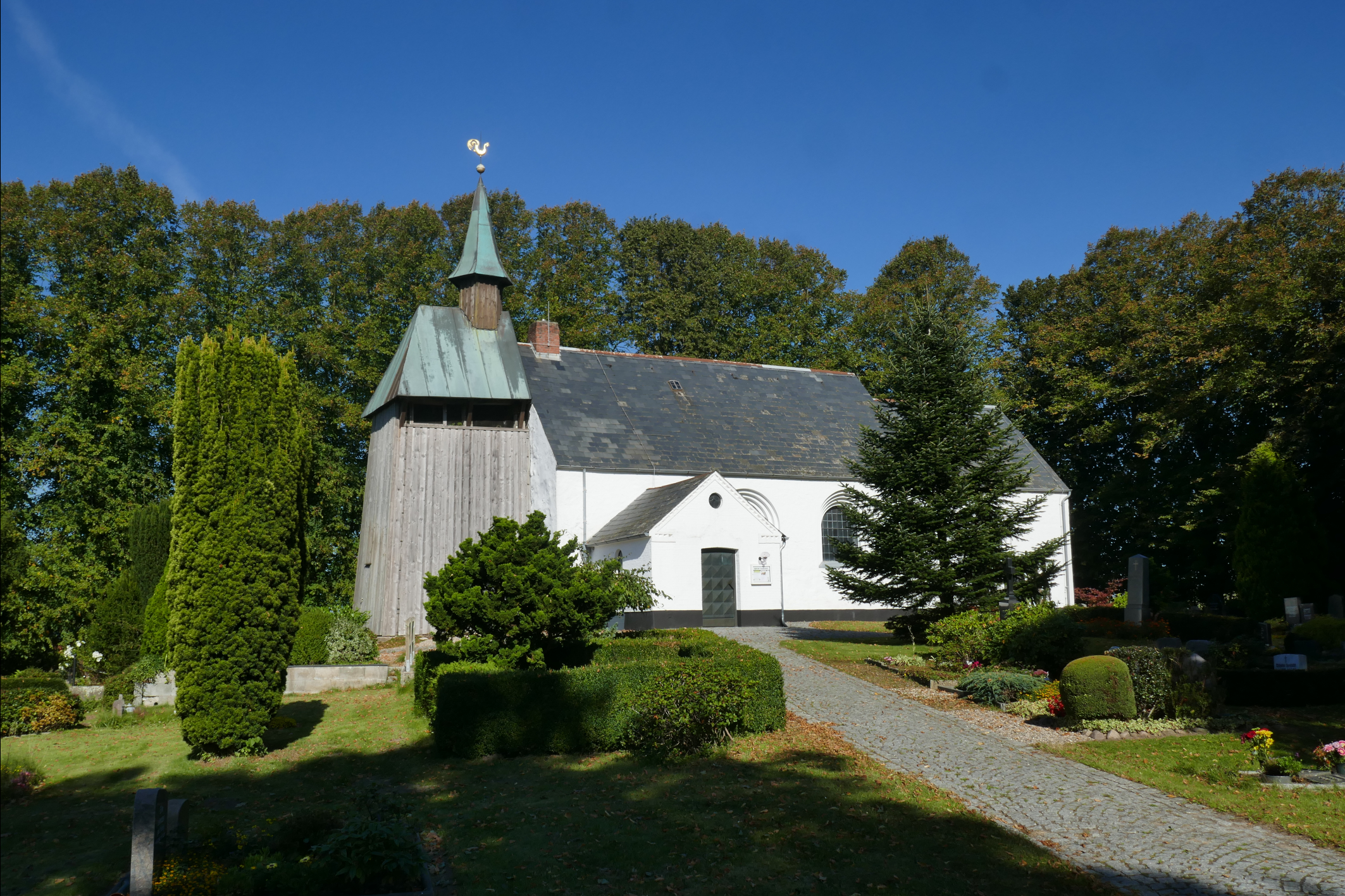

- Coat of arms

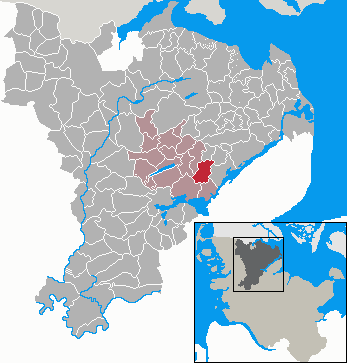
- Location of Taarstedt; Torsted within Schleswig-Flensburg district
- Interactive map of Taarstedt; Torsted
- Location within Germany Location within Schleswig-Holstein
- Coordinates: 54°34′N 9°40′E
- Country: Germany
- State: Schleswig-Holstein
- District: Schleswig-Flensburg
- Municipal assoc.: Südangeln

Government
  - Mayor: Hans Werner Berlau

Area
  - Total: 13.69 km^{2} (5.29 sq mi)
- Elevation: 23 m (75 ft)

Population (2025-12-31)
  - Total: 928
  - Density: 67.8/km^{2} (176/sq mi)
- Time zone: UTC+01:00 (CET)
  - Summer (DST): UTC+02:00 (CEST)
- Postal codes: 24893
- Dialling codes: 04622
- Vehicle registration: SL
- Website: www.amt- suedangeln.de

Taarstedt (Danish: Torsted) is a municipality in the district of Schleswig-Flensburg, in Schleswig-Holstein, Germany.
