= Uelsby =

Uelsby Ølsby
- Municipality
- Coat of arms

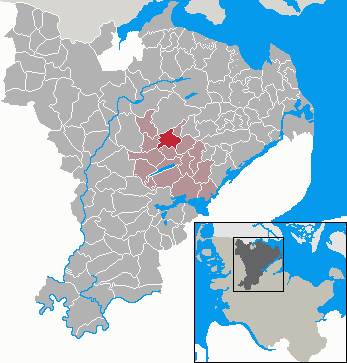
- Location of Uelsby; Ølsby within Schleswig-Flensburg district
- Interactive map of Uelsby; Ølsby
- Location within Germany Location within Schleswig-Holstein
- Coordinates: 54°36′N 9°34′E
- Country: Germany
- State: Schleswig-Holstein
- District: Schleswig-Flensburg
- Municipal assoc.: Südangeln

Government
  - Mayor: Ulrich Bachler

Area
  - Total: 10.6 km^{2} (4.1 sq mi)
- Elevation: 34 m (112 ft)

Population (2025-12-31)
  - Total: 401
  - Density: 37.8/km^{2} (98.0/sq mi)
- Time zone: UTC+01:00 (CET)
  - Summer (DST): UTC+02:00 (CEST)
- Postal codes: 24860
- Dialling codes: 04623
- Vehicle registration: SL
- Website: www.amt- suedangeln.de

Uelsby (Danish: Ølsby) is a municipality in the district of Schleswig-Flensburg, in Schleswig-Holstein, Germany.
