= Gøtugjógv =

- Village
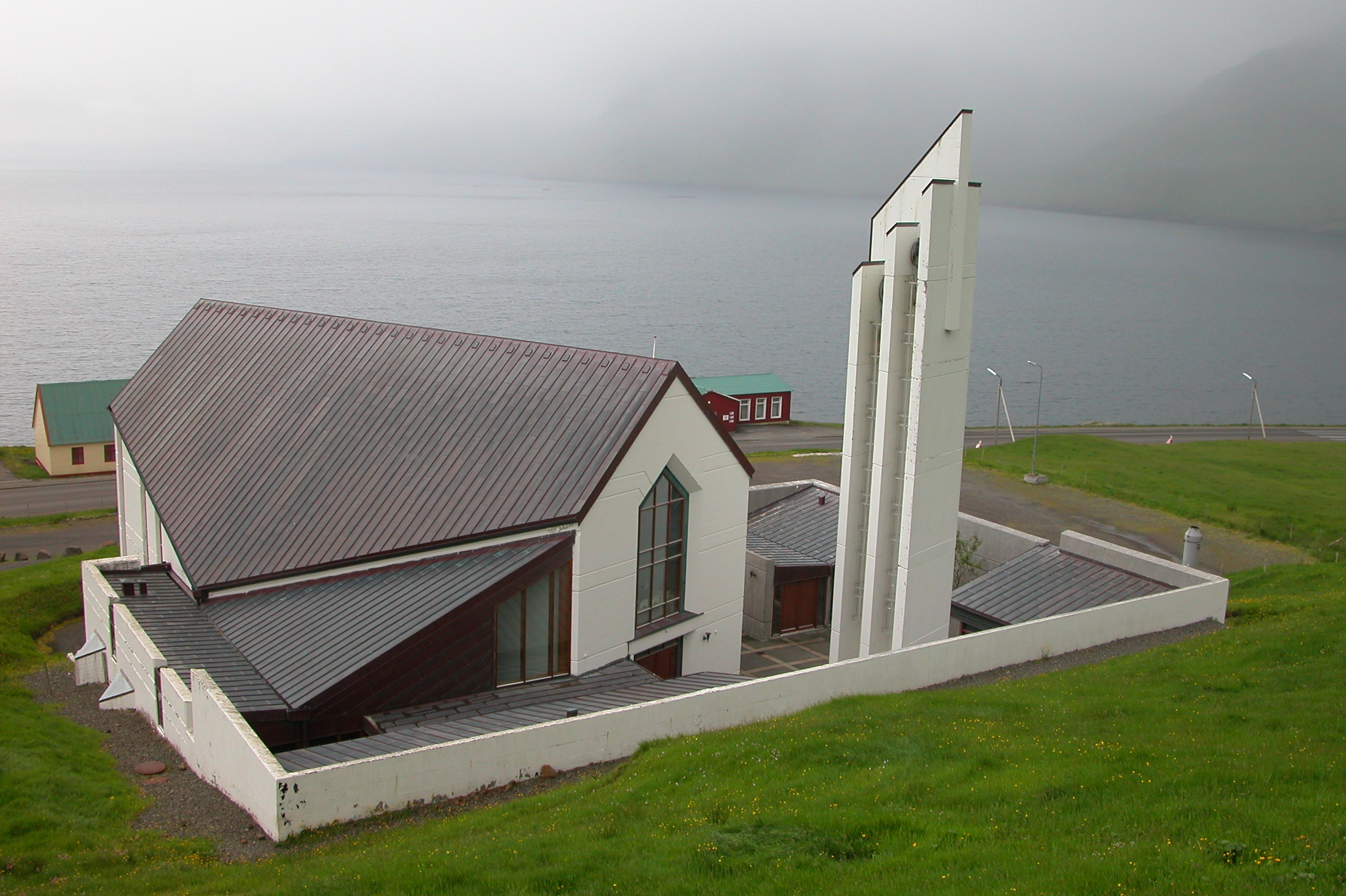
- Gøtu kirkja, Gøtugjógv, Faroe Islands

- Location in the Faroe Islands
- Coordinates: 62°11′25″N 6°44′47″W
- State: Kingdom of Denmark
- Constituent country: Faroe Islands
- Island: Eysturoy
- Municipality: Eystur

Population (September 2025)
  - Total: 49
- Time zone: GMT
  - Summer (DST): UTC+1 (EST)
- Postal code: FO 511
- Climate: Cfc

Gøtugjógv (Danish: Gøtegjov), Norðragøta and Syðrugøta are villages that are located in the Faroe Islands. These areas are located at the end of an inlet which is called 'Gøtuvík'. This is on the east side of the island of Eysturoy.

A new church has been built near Gøtugjógv, and inside it has huge stained glass windows made by the artist Tróndur Patursson from Kirkjubøur. The church turned out to be two times more expensive than originally planned.

From 1980 until 1989 there was an upper secondary school in Gøtugjógv.

== See also ==
- List of towns in the Faroe Islands
