= List of members of the Folketing, 2019–2022 =

70th Folketing
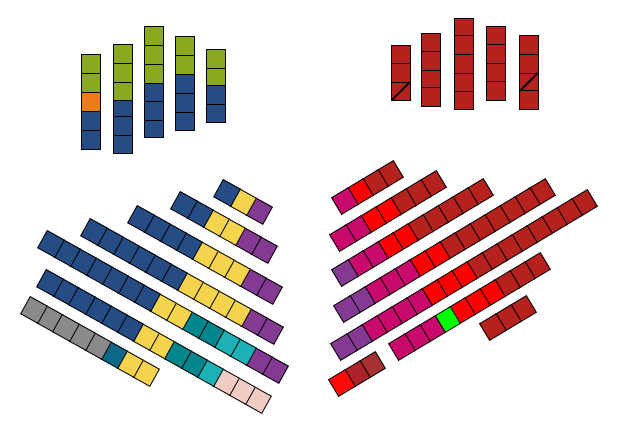
- Term: 5 June 2019 — 1 November 2022
- Speaker: A Henrik Dam Kristensen
- Prime Minister: A Mette Frederiksen
- Cabinet: Frederiksen
- Previous: 2015–2019
- Next: 2022–2026

This is a list of the 179 members of the Folketing in the 2019 to 2022 session. They were elected at the 2019 Danish general election. Their term has ended on 1 November 2022, the date of the 2022 Danish general election.

== Election results ==
Party	Votes	%	Seats	+/–
Denmark proper
Social Democrats (A)	914,882	25.9	48	+1
Venstre (V)	826,161	23.4	43	+9
Danish People's Party (O)	308,513	8.7	16	–21
Danish Social Liberal Party (B)	304,714	8.6	16	+8
Socialist People's Party (F)	272,304	7.7	14	+7
Red–Green Alliance (Ø)	245,100	6.9	13	–1
Conservative People's Party (C)	233,865	6.6	12	+6
The Alternative (Å)	104,278	3.0	5	–4
The New Right (D)	83,201	2.4	4	New
Liberal Alliance (I)	82,270	2.3	4	–9
Hard Line (P)	63,114	1.8	0	New
Christian Democrats (K)	60,944	1.7	0	0
Klaus Riskær Pedersen (E)	29,600	0.8	0	New
Independents	2,774	0.1	0	0
Invalid/blank votes	37,801	–	–	–
Total	3,569,521	100	175	0
Registered voters/turnout	4,219,537	84.6	–	–
Faroe Islands
Union Party	7,349	28.3	1	+1
Social Democratic Party	6,630	25.5	1	0
People's Party	6,181	23.8	0	0
Republic	4,830	18.6	0	–1
Progress	639	2.5	0	0
Self-Government Party	333	1.3	0	0
Invalid/blank votes	244	–	–	–
Total	26,206	100	2	0
Registered voters/turnout	37,264	70.3	–	–
Greenland
Inuit Ataqatigiit	6,881	33.4	1	0
Siumut	6,058	29.4	1	0
Democrats	2,262	11.0	0	0
Nunatta Qitornai	1,616	7.8	0	New
Partii Naleraq	1,565	7.6	0	0
Atassut	1,099	5.3	0	0
Cooperation Party	520	2.5	0	New
Invalid/blank votes	614	–	–	–
Total	20,615	100	2	0
Registered voters/turnout	41,344	49.9	–	–
Source: Statistics Denmark, Kringvarp Føroya, Qinersineq

== Seat distribution ==
Below is the distribution of the 179 seats as it appeared after the 2019 election, as well as the current distribution.

Party	Party leader	Group leader	Elected seats	End seats	Change
A Social Democrats	Mette Frederiksen	Leif Lahn Jensen	48	49	▲1
B Social Liberal Party	Sofie Carsten Nielsen		16	14	▼2
C Conservatives	Søren Pape Poulsen	Mai Mercado	12	12	Steady
D The New Right	Pernille Vermund	Peter Seier Christensen	4	4	Steady
F Socialist People's Party	Pia Olsen Dyhr	Jacob Mark	14	15	▲1
I Liberal Alliance	Alex Vanopslag	Ole Birk Olesen	4	3	▼1
K Christian Democrats	Isabella Arendt	Jens Rohde	-	1	▲1
O Danish People's Party	Morten Messerschmidt	Vacant	16	5	▼11
Q Independent Greens	Sikandar Siddique	Susanne Zimmer	-	3	▲3
V Liberals	Jakob Ellemann-Jensen	Thomas Danielsen	43	39	▼4
Ø Red-Green Alliance	Mai Villadsen (Note: Formally, the Red-Green Alliance have collective leadership, but Villadsen is their political spokesperson, and de facto leader of the party.)	Peder Hvelplund	13	13	Steady
Å The Alternative	Franciska Rosenkilde	Torsten Gejl	5	1	▼4
JF Social Democratic Party	Aksel V Johannesen	Sjúrður Skaale	1	1	Steady
SP Union Party	Bárður á Steig Nielsen	Edmund Joensen	1	1	Steady
IA Community of the People	Múte Bourup Egede	Aaja Chemnitz	1	1	Steady
SI Forward	Erik Jensen	Aki-Matilda Høegh-Dam	1	1	Steady
. Outside group			-	14	▲14

== Parliament members elected at the June 2019 election ==
Name	Birth year	Party	Constituency
Mette Abildgaard	1988	C Conservatives	North Zealand
Karina Adsbøl	1976	O Danish People's Party	South Jutland
Tommy Ahlers	1975	V Liberals	Copenhagen
Alex Ahrendtsen	1967	O Danish People's Party	Funen
Marlene Ambo-Rasmussen	1986	V Liberals	Funen
Samira Nawa Amini	1988	B Social Liberal Party	Copenhagen
Katarina Ammitzbøll	1969	C Conservatives	Copenhagen
Simon Emil Ammitzbøll-Bille	1977	I Liberal Alliance	Copenhagen
Hans Andersen	1974	V Liberals	North Zealand
Kirsten Normann Andersen	1962	F Socialist People's Party	East Jutland
Ida Auken	1978	B Social Liberal Party	Copenhagen
Britt Bager	1976	V Liberals	East Jutland
Heidi Bank	1972	V Liberals	East Jutland
Lise Bech	1961	O Danish People's Party	North Jutland
Lisbeth Bech-Nielsen	1982	F Socialist People's Party	North Jutland
Birgitte Bergman	1967	C Conservatives	North Zealand
Anne Valentin Berthelsen	1994	F Socialist People's Party	Zealand
Marie Bjerre	1986	V Liberals	North Jutland
Liselott Blixt	1965	O Danish People's Party	Zealand
Erling Bonnesen	1955	V Liberals	Funen
Trine Bramsen	1981	A Social Democrats	Funen
Bjørn Brandenborg	1991	A Social Democrats	Funen
Jeppe Bruus	1978	A Social Democrats	Greater Copenhagen
Morten Bødskov	1970	A Social Democrats	Greater Copenhagen
Bent Bøgsted	1956	O Danish People's Party	North Jutland
Anne Sophie Callesen	1988	B Social Liberal Party	East Jutland
Astrid Carøe	1994	F Socialist People's Party	Zealand
Peter Seier Christensen	1967	D The New Right	Zealand
René Christensen	1970	O Danish People's Party	Zealand
Henrik Dahl	1960	I Liberal Alliance	South Jutland
Jens Henrik Thulesen Dahl	1961	O Danish People's Party	Funen
Kristian Thulesen Dahl	1969	O Danish People's Party	South Jutland
Morten Dahlin	1989	V Liberals	Zealand
Lennart Damsbo-Andersen	1956	A Social Democrats	Zealand
Thomas Danielsen	1983	V Liberals	West Jutland
Karina Lorentzen Dehnhardt	1973	F Socialist People's Party	South Jutland
Mette Hjermind Dencker	1978	O Danish People's Party	East Jutland
Kaare Dybvad	1984	A Social Democrats	Zealand
Pia Olsen Dyhr	1971	F Socialist People's Party	Copenhagen
Uffe Elbæk	1954	Å The Alternative	Copenhagen
Louise Schack Elholm	1977	V Liberals	Zealand
Karen Ellemann	1969	V Liberals	Greater Copenhagen
Jakob Ellemann-Jensen	1973	V Liberals	East Jutland
Benny Engelbrecht	1970	A Social Democrats	South Jutland
Søren Espersen	1953	O Danish People's Party	Zealand
Camilla Fabricius	1971	A Social Democrats	East Jutland
Dennis Flydtkjær	1978	O Danish People's Party	West Jutland
Eva Flyvholm	1981	Ø Red-Green Alliance	Zealand
Claus Hjort Frederiksen	1947	V Liberals	North Zealand
Mette Frederiksen	1977	A Social Democrats	North Jutland
Mads Fuglede	1971	V Liberals	Greater Copenhagen
Martin Geertsen	1970	V Liberals	Copenhagen
Torsten Gejl	1964	Å The Alternative	East Jutland
Mette Gjerskov	1966	A Social Democrats	Zealand
Jette Gottlieb	1948	Ø Red-Green Alliance	Copenhagen
Ane Halsboe-Jørgensen	1983	A Social Democrats	North Jutland
Eva Kjer Hansen	1964	V Liberals	South Jutland
Niels Flemming Hansen	1974	C Conservatives	South Jutland
Orla Hav	1952	A Social Democrats	North Jutland
Kristian Hegaard	1991	B Social Liberal Party	North Zealand
Jane Heitmann	1968	V Liberals	Funen
Preben Bang Henriksen	1954	V Liberals	North Jutland
Magnus Heunicke	1975	A Social Democrats	Zealand
Peter Hummelgaard	1983	A Social Democrats	Copenhagen
Peder Hvelplund	1967	Ø Red-Green Alliance	North Jutland
Henning Hyllested	1954	Ø Red-Green Alliance	South Jutland
Nick Hækkerup	1968	A Social Democrats	North Zealand
Aki-Matilda Høegh-Dam	1996	SI Forward	Greenland
Karsten Hønge	1958	F Socialist People's Party	Funen
Bertel Haarder	1944	V Liberals	Zealand
Daniel Toft Jakobsen	1978	A Social Democrats	East Jutland
Rasmus Jarlov	1977	C Conservatives	Greater Copenhagen
Marianne Jelved	1943	B Social Liberal Party	North Jutland
Jacob Jensen	1973	V Liberals	Zealand
Kristian Jensen	1971	V Liberals	West Jutland
Leif Lahn Jensen	1967	A Social Democrats	East Jutland
Michael Aastrup Jensen	1976	V Liberals	East Jutland
Mogens Jensen	1963	A Social Democrats	West Jutland
Thomas Jensen	1970	A Social Democrats	West Jutland
Brigitte Klintskov Jerkel	1969	C Conservatives	Zealand
Jens Joel	1978	A Social Democrats	East Jutland
Edmund Joensen	1944	SP Union Party	Faroe Islands
Jan Johansen	1955	A Social Democrats	Funen
Peter Juel-Jensen	1966	V Liberals	Bornholm
Christian Juhl	1953	Ø Red-Green Alliance	Zealand
Mona Juul	1967	C Conservatives	East Jutland
Dan Jørgensen	1975	A Social Democrats	Funen
Jan E. Jørgensen	1965	V Liberals	Copenhagen
Naser Khader	1963	C Conservatives	Zealand
Carsten Kissmeyer	1953	V Liberals	West Jutland
Kasper Sand Kjær	1989	A Social Democrats	Greater Copenhagen
Pia Kjærsgaard	1947	O Danish People's Party	Greater Copenhagen
Marcus Knuth	1976	V Liberals	Zealand
Stén Knuth	1964	V Liberals	Zealand
Simon Kollerup	1986	A Social Democrats	North Jutland
Astrid Krag	1982	A Social Democrats	Zealand
Marie Krarup	1965	O Danish People's Party	South Jutland
Henrik Dam Kristensen	1957	A Social Democrats	East Jutland
Anders Kronborg	1982	A Social Democrats	South Jutland
Rasmus Horn Langhoff	1980	A Social Democrats	Zealand
Henrik Sass Larsen	1966	A Social Democrats	Zealand
Malte Larsen	1968	A Social Democrats	East Jutland
Per Larsen	1965	C Conservatives	North Jutland
Aaja Chemnitz	1977	IA Community of the People	Greenland
Karsten Lauritzen	1983	V Liberals	North Jutland
Bjarne Laustsen	1953	A Social Democrats	North Jutland
Martin Lidegaard	1966	B Social Liberal Party	North Zealand
Lars Christian Lilleholt	1965	V Liberals	Funen
Annette Lind	1969	A Social Democrats	West Jutland
Stinus Lindgreen	1980	B Social Liberal Party	Greater Copenhagen
Kristian Pihl Lorentzen	1961	V Liberals	West Jutland
Rosa Lund	1986	Ø Red-Green Alliance	Copenhagen
Rune Lund	1981	Ø Red-Green Alliance	Copenhagen
Sophie Løhde	1983	V Liberals	North Zealand
Christian Rabjerg Madsen	1986	A Social Democrats	South Jutland
Jacob Mark	1991	F Socialist People's Party	Zealand
Lars Boje Mathiesen	1975	D The New Right	East Jutland
Anni Matthiesen	1964	V Liberals	South Jutland
Christoffer Aagaard Melson	1984	V Liberals	South Jutland
Mai Mercado	1980	C Conservatives	Funen
Morten Messerschmidt	1980	O Danish People's Party	North Zealand
Flemming Møller Mortensen	1963	A Social Democrats	North Jutland
Signe Munk	1990	F Socialist People's Party	West Jutland
Charlotte Broman Mølbæk	1977	F Socialist People's Party	East Jutland
Henrik Møller	1965	A Social Democrats	North Zealand
Sofie Carsten Nielsen	1975	B Social Liberal Party	Greater Copenhagen
Rasmus Nordqvist	1975	Å The Alternative	Zealand
Ellen Trane Nørby	1980	V Liberals	South Jutland
Halime Oguz	1970	F Socialist People's Party	Copenhagen
Ole Birk Olesen	1972	I Liberal Alliance	East Jutland
Kathrine Olldag	1972	B Social Liberal Party	Zealand
Anne Paulin	1988	A Social Democrats	West Jutland
Torsten Schack Pedersen	1976	V Liberals	North Jutland
Jesper Petersen	1981	A Social Democrats	South Jutland
Rasmus Helveg Petersen	1968	B Social Liberal Party	Funen
Søren Pape Poulsen	1971	C Conservatives	West Jutland
Troels Lund Poulsen	1976	V Liberals	East Jutland
Rasmus Prehn	1973	A Social Democrats	North Jutland
Lars Aslan Rasmussen	1978	A Social Democrats	Copenhagen
Lars Løkke Rasmussen	1964	V Liberals	Zealand
Søren Egge Rasmussen	1961	Ø Red-Green Alliance	East Jutland
Troels Ravn	1961	A Social Democrats	South Jutland
Katrine Robsøe	1991	B Social Liberal Party	East Jutland
Lotte Rod	1985	B Social Liberal Party	South Jutland
Jens Rohde	1970	B Social Liberal Party	Copenhagen
Pernille Rosenkrantz-Theil	1977	A Social Democrats	Copenhagen
Kasper Roug	1979	A Social Democrats	Zealand
Hans Christian Schmidt	1953	V Liberals	South Jutland
Sikandar Siddique	1986	Å The Alternative	Greater Copenhagen
Pernille Skipper	1984	Ø Red-Green Alliance	Copenhagen
Julie Skovsby	1978	A Social Democrats	Funen
Sjúrður Skaale	1967	JF Social Democratic Party	Faroe Islands
Peter Skaarup	1964	O Danish People's Party	Copenhagen
Hans Kristian Skibby	1969	O Danish People's Party	East Jutland
Zenia Stampe	1979	B Social Liberal Party	Zealand
Andreas Steenberg	1983	B Social Liberal Party	West Jutland
Rasmus Stoklund	1984	A Social Democrats	North Zealand
Ina Strøjer-Schmidt	1988	F Socialist People's Party	Greater Copenhagen
Inger Støjberg	1973	V Liberals	West Jutland
Jakob Sølvhøj	1954	Ø Red-Green Alliance	West Jutland
Søren Søndergaard	1955	Ø Red-Green Alliance	Greater Copenhagen
Mattias Tesfaye	1981	A Social Democrats	Greater Copenhagen
Mette Thiesen	1981	D The New Right	North Zealand
Trine Torp	1970	F Socialist People's Party	North Zealand
Ulla Tørnæs	1962	V Liberals	South Jutland
Carl Valentin	1992	F Socialist People's Party	Copenhagen
Kim Valentin	1963	V Liberals	Greater Copenhagen
Alex Vanopslagh	1991	I Liberal Alliance	West Jutland
Victoria Velasquez	1991	Ø Red-Green Alliance	Funen
Pernille Vermund	1975	D The New Right	South Jutland
Mai Villadsen	1991	Ø Red-Green Alliance	North Zealand
Birgitte Vind	1965	A Social Democrats	South Jutland
Nicolai Wammen	1971	A Social Democrats	East Jutland
Lea Wermelin	1985	A Social Democrats	Bornholm
Susanne Zimmer	1960	Å The Alternative	North Jutland
Fatma Øktem	1973	V Liberals	East Jutland
Orla Østerby	1952	C Conservatives	West Jutland
Anne Honoré Østergaard	1981	V Liberals	North Jutland
Morten Østergaard	1976	B Social Liberal Party	East Jutland

== Party and member changes after the June 2019 elections ==
=== Party changes ===
Below are all parliament members that have joined another party or become independent during the term.

Simon Emil Ammitzbøll-Bille created Forward in October 2019 and dissolved the party a year later in October 2020. During his time in his new party, the Folketing considered him to be outside a group. Uffe Elbæk, Sikander Siddique and Susanne Zimmer created Independent Greens in September 2020. The same was the case for Lars Løkke Rasmussen, who founded the Moderates in June 2021. The Independent Greens became an official group in the Folketing after they had collected the required signatures to be able to run in the next Folketing election.

On 18 August 2021, the Conservative People's Party told Naser Khader that he could not continue in the party, after allegations that Khader had been responsible for several cases of sexual harassment. Khader accepted this and left the party.

Name	Old party	Constituency	New party	Date
Simon Emil Ammitzbøll-Bille	I Liberal Alliance	Copenhagen	. Independent	22 October 2019
Marcus Knuth	V Liberals	Zealand	C Conservatives	29 November 2019
Uffe Elbæk	Å The Alternative	Copenhagen	. Independent	9 March 2020
Uffe Elbæk	. Independent	Copenhagen	Q Independent Greens	3 November 2021
Uffe Elbæk	Q Independent Greens	Copenhagen	Å The Alternative	16 September 2022
Rasmus Nordqvist	Å The Alternative	Zealand	. Independent	9 March 2020
Rasmus Nordqvist	. Independent	Zealand	F Socialist People's Party	13 May 2020
Sikandar Siddique	Å The Alternative	Greater Copenhagen	. Independent	9 March 2020
Sikandar Siddique	. Independent	Greater Copenhagen	Q Independent Greens	3 November 2021
Susanne Zimmer	Å The Alternative	North Jutland	. Independent	9 March 2020
Susanne Zimmer	. Independent	North Jutland	Q Independent Greens	3 November 2021
Orla Østerby	C Conservatives	West Jutland	. Independent	4 December 2020
Lars Løkke Rasmussen	V Liberals	Zealand	. Independent	1 January 2021
Jens Rohde	B Social Liberal Party	Copenhagen	. Independent	25 January 2021
Jens Rohde	. Independent	Copenhagen	K Christian Democrats	26 April 2021
Ida Auken	B Social Liberal Party	Copenhagen	A Social Democrats	29 January 2021
Inger Støjberg	V Liberals	West Jutland	. Independent	4 February 2021
Britt Bager	V Liberals	East Jutland	C Conservatives	23 March 2021
Naser Khader	C Conservatives	Zealand	. Independent	18 August 2021
Liselott Blixt	O Danish People's Party	Zealand	. Independent	21 February 2022
Bent Bøgsted	O Danish People's Party	North Jutland	. Independent	21 February 2022
Bent Bøgsted	. Independent	North Jutland	Æ Denmark Democrats	17 August 2022
Karina Adsbøl	O Danish People's Party	South Jutland	. Independent	21 February 2022
Karina Adsbøl	. Independent	South Jutland	Æ Denmark Democrats	17 August 2022
Lise Bech	O Danish People's Party	North Jutland	. Independent	21 February 2022
Lise Bech	. Independent	North Jutland	Æ Denmark Democrats	17 August 2022
Hans Kristian Skibby	O Danish People's Party	East Jutland	. Independent	22 February 2022
Hans Kristian Skibby	. Independent	East Jutland	Æ Denmark Democrats	17 August 2022
Marie Krarup	O Danish People's Party	South Jutland	. Independent	26 February 2022
Jens Henrik Thulesen Dahl	O Danish People's Party	Funen	. Independent	24 June 2022
Jens Henrik Thulesen Dahl	. Independent	Funen	Æ Denmark Democrats	17 August 2022
Peter Skaarup	O Danish People's Party	Copenhagen	. Independent	24 June 2022
Peter Skaarup	. Independent	Copenhagen	Æ Denmark Democrats	29 July 2022
Søren Espersen	O Danish People's Party	Zealand	. Independent	25 June 2022
Søren Espersen	. Independent	Zealand	Æ Denmark Democrats	17 August 2022
Dennis Flydtkjær	O Danish People's Party	West Jutland	. Independent	25 June 2022
Dennis Flydtkjær	. Independent	West Jutland	Æ Denmark Democrats	17 August 2022
Kristian Thulesen Dahl	O Danish People's Party	South Jutland	. Independent	29 June 2022

=== Lasting member changes ===
Below are member changes that will last through the entire term.

Replacement	Birth year	Party	Constituency	Replaced MP	Date	Reason
Tanja Larsson	1977	A Social Democrats	Zealand	Henrik Sass Larsen	30 September 2019	Larsen resigned his seat.
Kenneth Mikkelsen	1971	V Liberals	West Jutland	Kristian Jensen	1 April 2021	Jensen resigned his seat.
Susan Kronborg	1968	B Social Liberal Party	East Jutland	Morten Østergaard	17 June 2021	Østergaard resigned his seat.
Anne Rasmussen	1971	V Liberals	Copenhagen	Tommy Ahlers	12 August 2021	Ahlers resigned his seat.
Christina Thorholm	1964	B Social Liberal Party	North Zealand	Kristian Hegaard	30 August 2021	Hegaard resigned his seat.
Gitte Willumsen	1973	C Conservatives	West Jutland	Inger Støjberg	10 May 2022	Impeachment of Inger Støjberg
Maja Torp	1973	V Liberals	North Jutland	Karsten Lauritzen	1 February 2022	Lauritzen resigned his seat
Maria Gudme	1989	A Social Democrats	North Zealand	Nick Hækkerup	21 December 2021	Hækkerup resigned his seat
Susanne Eilersen	1964	O Danish People's Party	South Jutland	Kristian Thulesen Dahl	1 August 2022	Thulesen Dahl resigned his seat
Jonathan Simmel	1987	Ø Red-Green Alliance	Copenhagen	Rune Lund	12 August 2022	Lund resigned his seat

=== Temporary member changes ===
Below are temporary member replacements during the term.

Replacement	Birth year	Party	Constituency	Replaced MP	Start	End	Length
Egil Hulgaard	1962	C Conservatives	North Zealand	Mette Abildgaard	5 August 2019	27 September 2019	53 days
Nils Sjøberg	1960	B Social Liberal Party	South Jutland	Lotte Rod	2 September 2019	1 August 2020	334 days
Mira Issa Bloch	1970	Å The Alternative	East Jutland	Torsten Gejl	22 October 2019	21 November 2019	30 days
Balder Mørk Andersen	1976	F Socialist People's Party	Copenhagen	Halime Oguz	30 October 2019	15 November 2019	16 days
Carsten Kudsk	1971	O Danish People's Party	Funen	Jens Henrik Thulesen-Dahl	30 October 2019	15 November 2019	16 days
Susanne Eilersen	1964	O Danish People's Party	South Jutland	Marie Krarup	30 October 2019	15 November 2019	16 days
Pernille Bendixen	1973	O Danish People's Party	Funen	Alex Ahrendtsen	3 December 2019	30 September 2020	302 days
Gitte Willumsen	1967	V Liberals	West Jutland	Thomas Danielsen	1 January 2020	30 June 2020	181 days
Theresa Berg Andersen	1979	F Socialist People's Party	North Jutland	Lisbeth Bech-Nielsen	1 January 2020	1 August 2020	213 days
Dorthe Hindborg	1968	A Social Democrats	East Jutland	Jens Joel	6 January 2020	28 February 2020	53 days
Anders G. Christensen	1962	V Liberals	East Jutland	Troels Lund Poulsen	10 March 2020	18 March 2020	8 days
Anna Brændemose	1993	F Socialist People's Party	East Jutland	Charlotte Broman Mølbæk	10 March 2020	3 May 2020	54 days
Barbara Gaardlykke Apol	1995	JF Social Democratic Party	Faroe Islands	Sjúrður Skaale	17 March 2020	24 March 2020	7 days
Ruben Kidde	1986	B Social Liberal Party	Copenhagen	Ida Auken	16 April 2020	2 February 2021	292 days
Hanne Bjørn-Klausen	1972	C Conservatives	Greater Copenhagen	Rasmus Jarlov	12 May 2020	30 September 2020	141 days
Christian Langballe	1967	O Danish People's Party	West Jutland	Dennis Flydtkjær	9 June 2020	26 June 2020	17 days
Egil Hulgaard	1962	C Conservatives	North Zealand	Mette Abildgaard	1 August 2020	28 March 2021	239 days
Magnus Rasmussen	1962	SP Union Party	Faroe Islands	Edmund Joensen	3 November 2020	10 November 2020	7 days
Susan Kronborg	1968	B Social Liberal Party	East Jutland	Morten Østergaard	10 November 2020	16 June 2021	218 days
Henrik Vinther	1969	B Social Liberal Party	East Jutland	Anne Sophie Callesen	17 November 2020	4 June 2021	199 days
Theresa Berg Andersen	1979	F Socialist People's Party	North Jutland	Lisbeth Bech-Nielsen	15 December 2020	1 August 2021	229 days
Bruno Jerup	1957	Ø Red-Green Alliance	Zealand	Eva Flyvholm	15 December 2020	31 March 2021	106 days
Rasmus Vestergaard Madsen	1991	Ø Red-Green Alliance	South Jutland	Henning Hyllested	1 January 2021	8 June 2021	158 days
Merete Scheelsbeck	1986	C Conservatives	Greater Copenhagen	Rasmus Jarlov	1 February 2021	30 April 2021	88 days
Karin Gaardsted	1955	A Social Democrats	West Jutland	Anne Paulin	22 February 2021	31 August 2021	190 days
Maja Torp	1973	V Liberals	North Jutland	Marie Bjerre	1 March 2021	30 April 2021	60 days
Mads Andersen	1984	C Conservatives	Zealand	Naser Khader	13 April 2021	31 July 2021	109 days
Barbara Gaardlykke Apol	1995	JF Social Democratic Party	Faroe Islands	Sjúrður Skaale	16 May 2021	23 May 2021	7 days
Stine Pilt Olsen	1980	C Conservatives	Zealand	Brigitte Klintskov Jerkel	20 May 2021	31 July 2021	72 days
Mads Andersen	1984	C Conservatives	Zealand	Brigitte Klintskov Jerkel	1 August 2021	16 August 2021	15 days
Alexander Grandt	1989	A Social Democrats	Funen	Bjørn Brandenborg	16 September 2021		1,774 days
Anne Sina	1987	A Social Democrats	Greater Copenhagen	Jeppe Bruus	19 September 2021	14 November 2021	56 days
Karsten Filsø	1959	F Socialist People's Party	West Jutland	Signe Munk	7 October 2021		1,753 days
Brian Bressendorff	1987	A Social Democrats	Zealand	Mette Gjerskov	7 October 2021		1,753 days
Mark Grossmann	1973	V Liberals	Funen	Lars Christian Lilleholt	14 October 2021	13 December 2021	60 days
Kim Aas	1970	A Social Democrats	Zealand	Tanja Larsson	25 October 2021		1,735 days
Jan Bjergskov Larsen	1965	F Socialist People's Party	Zealand	Jacob Mark	23 November 2021		1,706 days
Abbas Razvi	1948	B Social Liberal Party	Greater Copenhagen	Stinus Lindgreen	6 December 2021		1,693 days
Helgi Abrahamsen	1966	SP Union Party	Faroe Islands	Edmund Joensen	7 December 2021	16 December 2021	9 days
