= List of members of the Folketing, 2005–2007 =

66th Folketing
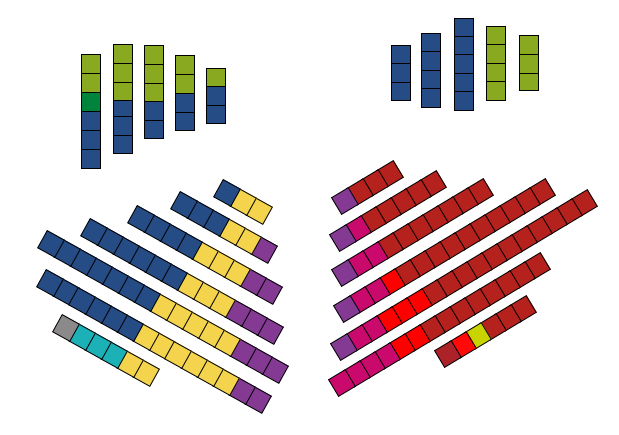
- Term: 8 February 2005 - 13 November 2007
- Speaker: V Christian Mejdahl
- Prime Minister: V Anders Fogh Rasmussen
- Cabinet: Fogh Rasmussen II
- Previous: 2001-2005
- Next: 2007-2011

This is a list of the 179 members of the Folketing, in the 2005 to 2007 session. They were elected at the 2005 general election.

== Election results ==
Denmark proper
Party	Votes	%	Seats	+/–
Venstre	974,636	29.0	52	–4
Social Democratic Party	867,349	25.8	47	–5
Danish People's Party	444,947	13.3	24	+2
Conservative People's Party	344,886	10.3	18	+2
Danish Social Liberal Party	308,212	9.2	17	+8
Socialist People's Party	201,047	6.0	11	–1
Red-Green Alliance	114,123	3.4	6	+2
Christian Democrats	58,071	1.7	0	–4
Centre Democrats	33,880	1.0	0	0
Minority Party	8,850	0.3	0	New
Independents	1,211	0.0	0	0
Invalid/blank votes	27,348	–	–	–
Total	3,384,560	100	175	0
Faroe Islands
Republican Party	6,301	25.4	1	0
People's Party	5,967	24.0	1	+1
Social Democratic Party	5,518	22.2	0	0
Union Party	5,333	21.5	0	–1
Centre Party	829	3.3	0	New
Self-Government Party	585	2.4	0	0
Independents	309	1.2	0	New
Invalid/blank votes	94	–	–	–
Total	24,936	100	2	0
Greenland
Siumut	7,761	34.3	1	0
Inuit Ataqatigiit	5,774	25.5	1	0
Democrats	4,909	21.7	0	New
Atassut	3,374	14.9	0	0
Independents	841	3.7	0	0
Invalid/blank votes	457	–	–	–
Total	23,516	100	2	0
Source: Nohlen & Stöver

== Seat distribution ==
Below is the distribution of the 179 seats as it appeared after the 2005 election, as well at the distribution at the end of the term.

Party	Party leader	Elected seats	End seats	Change
A Social Democrats	Helle Thorning-Schmidt	47	47	Steady
B Social Liberal Party	Margrethe Vestager	17	16	▼1
C Conservatives	Bendt Bendtsen	18	18	Steady
F Socialist People's Party	Villy Søvndal	11	11	Steady
O Danish People's Party	Pia Kjærsgaard	24	23	▼1
V Liberals	Anders Fogh Rasmussen	52	50	▼2
Y New Alliance	Naser Khader	-	3	▲3
Ø Red-Green Alliance	Collective leadership	6	6	Steady
FF People's Party	Jørgen Niclasen	1	1	Steady
TJ Republic	Høgni Hoydal	1	1	Steady
IA Community of the People	Josef Motzfeldt	1	1	Steady
SI Forward	Hans Enoksen	1	1	Steady
. Outside group		-	1	▲1

== Parliament members elected at the February 2005 election ==
Name	Birth year	Party	Constituency
Thomas Adelskov	1964	A Social Democrats	Vestsjælland
Simon Emil Ammitzbøll-Bille	1977	B Social Liberal Party	Storstrøm
Hans Andersen	1974	V Liberals	Frederiksborg
Jytte Andersen	1942	A Social Democrats	Østre
Kim Andersen	1957	V Liberals	Århus
Poul Andersen	1952	A Social Democrats	Fyn
Charlotte Antonsen	1959	V Liberals	Frederiksborg
Christine Antorini	1965	A Social Democrats	Søndre
Hüseyin Arac	1956	A Social Democrats	Århus
Jørgen Arbo-Bæhr	1955	Ø Red-Green Alliance	Vestre
Elisabeth Arnold	1941	B Social Liberal Party	Århus
Svend Auken	1943	A Social Democrats	Århus
Pernille Vigsø Bagge	1975	F Socialist People's Party	Nordjylland
Line Barfod	1964	Ø Red-Green Alliance	København
Lars Barfoed	1957	C Conservatives	Frederiksborg
Gitte Lillelund Bech	1969	V Liberals	København
Tom Behnke	1966	C Conservatives	Århus
Bendt Bendtsen	1954	C Conservatives	Fyn
René Skau Björnsson	1967	A Social Democrats	Århus
Erling Bonnesen	1955	V Liberals	Fyn
Sandy Brinck	1972	A Social Democrats	Vestsjælland
Colette Brix	1950	O Danish People's Party	Storstrøm
Kirsten Brosbøl	1977	A Social Democrats	Århus
Lotte Bundsgaard	1973	A Social Democrats	Fyn
Morten Bødskov	1970	A Social Democrats	København
Bent Bøgsted	1956	O Danish People's Party	Nordjylland
Anne Baastrup	1952	F Socialist People's Party	Fyn
Carina Christensen	1972	C Conservatives	Fyn
Peter Christensen	1975	V Liberals	Sønderjylland
Poul Erik Christensen	1943	B Social Liberal Party	Viborg
Troels Christensen	1954	V Liberals	Vestsjælland
Anne-Mette Winther Christiansen	1966	V Liberals	Århus
Kim Christiansen	1956	O Danish People's Party	Århus
Pia Christmas-Møller	1961	C Conservatives	København
Walter Christophersen	1951	O Danish People's Party	Frederiksborg
Per Clausen	1955	Ø Red-Green Alliance	Nordjylland
Bente Dahl	1946	B Social Liberal Party	Sønderjylland
Kristian Thulesen Dahl	1969	O Danish People's Party	Fyn
Mikkel Dencker	1975	O Danish People's Party	København
Jørn Dohrmann	1969	O Danish People's Party	Vejle
Lone Dybkjær	1940	B Social Liberal Party	Vestre
Charlotte Dyremose	1977	C Conservatives	København
Inge-Lene Ebdrup	1975	V Liberals	Nordjylland
Joan Erlandsen	1943	V Liberals	Bornholm
Lene Espersen	1965	C Conservatives	Nordjylland
Søren Espersen	1953	O Danish People's Party	København
Mia Falkenberg	1983	O Danish People's Party	Vestsjælland
Charlotte Fischer	1963	B Social Liberal Party	Søndre
Claus Hjort Frederiksen	1947	V Liberals	København
Mette Frederiksen	1977	A Social Democrats	København
Louise Frevert	1953	O Danish People's Party	Frederiksborg
Steen Gade	1945	F Socialist People's Party	Viborg
Søren Gade	1963	V Liberals	Ringkøbing
Elisabeth Geday	1965	B Social Liberal Party	København
Pia Gjellerup	1959	A Social Democrats	Vestre
Mette Gjerskov	1966	A Social Democrats	Roskilde
Ole Glahn	1947	B Social Liberal Party	Vestsjælland
Carsten Hansen	1957	A Social Democrats	Fyn
Christian H. Hansen	1963	O Danish People's Party	Ringkøbing
Eva Kjer Hansen	1964	V Liberals	Vejle
Flemming Hansen	1939	C Conservatives	Vejle
Lene Hansen	1948	A Social Democrats	Nordjylland
Pernille Blach Hansen	1974	A Social Democrats	Viborg
Torben Hansen	1965	A Social Democrats	Århus
Poul Henrik Hedeboe	1946	F Socialist People's Party	Frederiksborg
Connie Hedegaard	1960	C Conservatives	København
Martin Henriksen	1980	O Danish People's Party	Vestre
Magnus Heunicke	1975	A Social Democrats	Storstrøm
Britta Schall Holberg	1941	V Liberals	Fyn
Anne Grete Holmsgaard	1948	F Socialist People's Party	Østre
Morten Homann	1974	F Socialist People's Party	Århus
Birthe Rønn Hornbech	1943	V Liberals	Roskilde
Svend Erik Hovmand	1945	V Liberals	Storstrøm
Høgni Hoydal	1966	TJ Republic	Faroe Islands
Rikke Hvilshøj	1970	V Liberals	Vestre
Karen Hækkerup	1974	A Social Democrats	København
Klaus Hækkerup	1943	A Social Democrats	Frederiksborg
Bertel Haarder	1944	V Liberals	Vestsjælland
Marianne Jelved	1943	B Social Liberal Party	Nordjylland
Frank Jensen	1961	A Social Democrats	Nordjylland
Jacob Jensen	1973	V Liberals	Vestsjælland
Kristian Jensen	1971	V Liberals	Ringkøbing
Lene Jensen	1964	A Social Democrats	Storstrøm
Michael Aastrup Jensen	1976	V Liberals	Århus
Mogens Jensen	1963	A Social Democrats	Ringkøbing
Lars-Emil Johansen	1946	SI Forward	Greenland
Birgitte Josefsen	1951	V Liberals	Nordjylland
Per Ørum Jørgensen	1970	C Conservatives	Ringkøbing
Anfinn Kallsberg	1947	FF People's Party	Faroe Islands
Naser Khader	1963	B Social Liberal Party	Østre
Jens Kirk	1942	V Liberals	Ringkøbing
Kurt Kirkegaard	1953	V Liberals	Ribe
Henriette Kjær	1966	C Conservatives	Århus
Pia Kjærsgaard	1947	O Danish People's Party	København
Kuupik Kleist	1958	IA Community of the People	Greenland
Karen J. Klint	1947	A Social Democrats	Vejle
Anita Knakkergaard	1947	O Danish People's Party	Nordjylland
Jeppe Kofod	1974	A Social Democrats	Bornholm
Søren Krarup	1937	O Danish People's Party	Sønderjylland
Pia Kristensen	1953	O Danish People's Party	Roskilde
Per Kaalund	1937	A Social Democrats	København
Jesper Langballe	1939	O Danish People's Party	Viborg
Flemming Damgaard Larsen	1951	V Liberals	Roskilde
Henrik Sass Larsen	1966	A Social Democrats	Roskilde
Pia Larsen	1956	V Liberals	København
Bjarne Laustsen	1953	A Social Democrats	Nordjylland
Martin Lidegaard	1966	B Social Liberal Party	Roskilde
Lars Chr. Lilleholt	1965	V Liberals	Fyn
Kristian Pihl Lorentzen	1961	V Liberals	Viborg
Jens Christian Lund	1945	A Social Democrats	Viborg
Rune Lund	1976	Ø Red-Green Alliance	Fyn
Mogens Lykketoft	1946	A Social Democrats	København
Jens Hald Madsen	1968	V Liberals	Roskilde
Lissa Mathiasen	1948	A Social Democrats	Vejle
Christian Mejdahl	1939	V Liberals	Nordjylland
Anne-Marie Meldgaard	1948	A Social Democrats	Århus
Morten Messerschmidt	1980	O Danish People's Party	Århus
Brian Mikkelsen	1966	C Conservatives	Vestsjælland
Leif Mikkelsen	1945	V Liberals	Århus
Kim Mortensen	1964	A Social Democrats	Ribe
Helge Adam Møller	1942	C Conservatives	Storstrøm
Lone Møller	1949	A Social Democrats	Frederiksborg
Per Stig Møller	1942	C Conservatives	Vestre
Tina Nedergaard	1969	V Liberals	Nordjylland
Allan Niebuhr	1951	C Conservatives	Sønderjylland
Elsebeth Gerner Nielsen	1960	B Social Liberal Party	Vejle
Holger K. Nielsen	1950	F Socialist People's Party	København
Jakob Axel Nielsen	1967	C Conservatives	Nordjylland
Karsten Nonbo	1952	V Liberals	Storstrøm
Karin Nødgaard	1966	O Danish People's Party	Ribe
Poul Nødgaard	1936	O Danish People's Party	Vestsjælland
Ellen Trane Nørby	1980	V Liberals	Sønderjylland
Marion Pedersen	1949	V Liberals	København
Thor Pedersen	1945	V Liberals	Frederiksborg
Torsten Schack Pedersen	1976	V Liberals	Viborg
Jan Petersen	1958	A Social Democrats	Århus
Morten Helveg Petersen	1966	B Social Liberal Party	København
Niels Helveg Petersen	1939	B Social Liberal Party	Fyn
Tina Petersen	1965	O Danish People's Party	Fyn
Søren Pind	1969	V Liberals	Østre
Johannes Poulsen	1955	B Social Liberal Party	Ringkøbing
Troels Lund Poulsen	1976	V Liberals	Vejle
Rasmus Prehn	1973	A Social Democrats	Nordjylland
Kamal Qureshi	1970	F Socialist People's Party	Søndre
Anders Fogh Rasmussen	1953	V Liberals	København
Lars Løkke Rasmussen	1964	V Liberals	Frederiksborg
Troels Ravn	1961	A Social Democrats	Ribe
Jens Rohde	1970	B Social Liberal Party	Søndre
Pernille Rosenkrantz-Theil	1977	Ø Red-Green Alliance	Østre
Preben Rudiengaard	1944	V Liberals	Ribe
Helge Sander	1950	V Liberals	Nordjylland
Hans Christian Schmidt	1953	V Liberals	Sønderjylland
Lise von Seelen	1949	A Social Democrats	Sønderjylland
Hanne Severinsen	1944	V Liberals	Ringkøbing
Irene Simonsen	1958	V Liberals	Vejle
Niels Sindal	1950	A Social Democrats	Fyn
Helle Sjelle	1971	C Conservatives	Østre
Hans Kristian Skibby	1969	O Danish People's Party	Vejle
Birthe Skaarup	1939	O Danish People's Party	Århus
Peter Skaarup	1964	O Danish People's Party	Østre
Ole Sohn	1954	F Socialist People's Party	Vestsjælland
Ole Stavad	1949	A Social Democrats	Nordjylland
Inger Støjberg	1973	V Liberals	Viborg
Frode Sørensen	1946	A Social Democrats	Sønderjylland
Villy Søvndal	1952	F Socialist People's Party	Vejle
Helle Thorning-Schmidt	1966	A Social Democrats	Østre
Arne Toft	1948	A Social Democrats	Nordjylland
Kristen Touborg	1943	F Socialist People's Party	Ringkøbing
Jan Trøjborg	1955	A Social Democrats	Vejle
Ulla Tørnæs	1962	V Liberals	Ribe
Jens Peter Vernersen	1947	A Social Democrats	Ringkøbing
Eyvind Vesselbo	1946	V Liberals	Århus
Margrethe Vestager	1968	B Social Liberal Party	Frederiksborg
Jens Vibjerg	1949	V Liberals	Vejle
Christian Wedell-Neergaard	1956	C Conservatives	Roskilde
Jørgen Winther	1945	V Liberals	Århus
Jytte Wittrock	1945	A Social Democrats	Storstrøm
Morten Østergaard	1976	B Social Liberal Party	Århus
Frank Aaen	1951	Ø Red-Green Alliance	Århus

== Party and member changes after the February 2005 elections ==
=== Party changes ===
Below are all parliament members that have joined another party or become independent during the term.

Name	Old party	Constituency	New party	Date
Morten Messerschmidt	O Danish People's Party	Århus	. Independent	3 May 2007
Morten Messerschmidt	. Independent	Århus	O Danish People's Party	30 May 2007
Louise Frevert	O Danish People's Party	Frederiksborg	. Independent	9 May 2007
Naser Khader	B Social Liberal Party	Østre	. Independent	9 May 2007
Naser Khader	. Independent	Østre	Y New Alliance	10 July 2007
Leif Mikkelsen	V Liberals	Århus	. Independent	11 May 2007
Leif Mikkelsen	. Independent	Århus	Y New Alliance	10 July 2007
Inge-Lene Ebdrup	V Liberals	Nordjylland	Y New Alliance	15 August 2007

=== Lasting member changes ===
Below are member changes that lasted through the entire term.

Replacement	Birth year	Party	Constituency	Replaced MP	Date	Reason
Bjørn Medom Nielsen	1956	A Social Democrats	Vejle	Jan Trøjborg	1 January 2006	Trøjborg resigned his seat.
John Dyrby Paulsen	1963	A Social Democrats	Vestsjælland	Sandy Brinck	7 February 2006	Brinck resigned her seat.
Vibeke Grave	1958	A Social Democrats	Storstrøm	Lene Jensen	1 October 2006	Jensen resigned her seat.
Ulrik Kragh	1970	V Liberals	Søndre	Jens Rohde	9 January 2007	Rohde resigned his seat.
Sophie Hæstorp Andersen	1974	A Social Democrats	Vestre	Pia Gjellerup	20 February 2007	Gjellerup resigned her seat.
Ole Vagn Christensen	1943	A Social Democrats	Viborg	Pernille Blach Hansen	1 March 2007	Hansen resigned her seat.

=== Temporary member changes ===
Below are temporary member replacements during the term.

Replacement	Birth year	Party	Constituency	Replaced MP	Start	End	Length
Pernille Frahm	1954	F Socialist People's Party	Århus	Morten Homann	24 February 2005	9 March 2005	13 days
Henrik Brodersen	1964	O Danish People's Party	Vestsjælland	Mia Falkenberg	1 March 2005	16 June 2005	107 days
John Dyrby Paulsen	1963	A Social Democrats	Vestsjælland	Sandy Brinck	10 March 2005	30 April 2005	51 days
Majbrit Berlau	1977	Ø Red-Green Alliance	Østre	Pernille Rosenkrantz-Theil	31 March 2005	6 May 2005	36 days
Vibeke Grave	1958	A Social Democrats	Storstrøm	Magnus Heunicke	31 March 2005	30 April 2005	30 days
Jesper Kiel	1966	Ø Red-Green Alliance	Fyn	Rune Lund	25 April 2005	1 May 2005	6 days
Eigil Andersen	1953	F Socialist People's Party	Århus	Morten Homann	28 April 2005	17 June 2005	50 days
John Dyrby Paulsen	1963	A Social Democrats	Vestsjælland	Sandy Brinck	6 September 2005	6 February 2006	153 days
Signe Færch	1982	Ø Red-Green Alliance	Fyn	Rune Lund	6 October 2005	14 October 2005	8 days
Egil Møller	1941	O Danish People's Party	Frederiksborg	Louise Frevert	6 October 2005	16 November 2005	41 days
Majbrit Berlau	1977	Ø Red-Green Alliance	Østre	Pernille Rosenkrantz-Theil	13 October 2005	31 July 2006	291 days
Christian Friis Bach	1966	B Social Liberal Party	Søndre	Charlotte Fischer	27 October 2005	4 November 2005	8 days
Henrik Brodersen	1964	O Danish People's Party	Vestsjælland	Poul Nødgaard	27 October 2005	4 November 2005	8 days
Grethe H. Nielsen		A Social Democrats	Sønderjylland	Frode Sørensen	27 October 2005	4 November 2005	8 days
Marie Fugl		F Socialist People's Party	Østre	Anne Grete Holmsgaard	27 October 2005	8 November 2005	12 days
Per Dalgaard	1944	O Danish People's Party	Århus	Morten Messerschmidt	6 December 2005	16 December 2005	10 days
Sidsel Homann	1978	F Socialist People's Party	Viborg	Steen Gade	8 December 2005	16 December 2005	8 days
Tina Bostrup		B Social Liberal Party	Østre	Naser Khader	12 December 2005	18 December 2005	6 days
Søren Egge Rasmussen	1961	Ø Red-Green Alliance	Århus	Frank Aaen	12 December 2005	18 December 2005	6 days
Thomas Krog	1971	F Socialist People's Party	Nordjylland	Pernille Vigsø Bagge	10 January 2006	9 June 2006	150 days
Simon Pihl Sørensen	1966	A Social Democrats	København	Mette Frederiksen	10 January 2006	5 June 2006	146 days
Jesper Kinch-Jensen		A Social Democrats	Fyn	Poul Andersen	17 January 2006	28 February 2006	42 days
Jesper Kiel	1966	Ø Red-Green Alliance	Fyn	Rune Lund	23 January 2006	29 January 2006	6 days
Marianne Saxtoft		B Social Liberal Party	Århus	Morten Østergaard	23 January 2006	29 January 2006	6 days
Vibeke Grave	1958	A Social Democrats	Storstrøm	Magnus Heunicke	1 February 2006	28 February 2006	27 days
Michael Thomsen		F Socialist People's Party	Ringkøbing	Kristen Touborg	7 February 2006	13 February 2006	6 days
Søren Egge Rasmussen	1961	Ø Red-Green Alliance	Århus	Frank Aaen	21 March 2006	18 April 2006	28 days
Ole Vagn Christensen	1943	A Social Democrats	Viborg	Pernille Blach Hansen	1 May 2006	1 March 2007	304 days
Sidsel Leth Svensson		C Conservatives	Storstrøm	Helge Adam Møller	15 May 2006	29 May 2006	14 days
Dennis Flydtkjær	1978	O Danish People's Party	Ringkøbing	Christian H. Hansen	23 May 2006	2 June 2006	10 days
Henrik Fruergaard		V Liberals	Ringkøbing	Hanne Severinsen	29 May 2006	5 June 2006	7 days
Dorrit Knudsen	1960	A Social Democrats	Bornholm	Jeppe Kofod	3 October 2006	25 May 2007	234 days
Simon Pihl Sørensen	1966	A Social Democrats	København	Mette Frederiksen	3 October 2006	15 December 2006	73 days
Lotte Thiim Bertelsen		F Socialist People's Party	Søndre	Kamal Qureshi	5 October 2006	15 December 2006	71 days
Ulla Fasting		B Social Liberal Party	Ringkøbing	Johannes Poulsen	24 October 2006	3 November 2006	10 days
Rikke Karlsson	1965	O Danish People's Party	Nordjylland	Bent Bøgsted	24 October 2006	3 November 2006	10 days
Astrid Krag	1982	F Socialist People's Party	Vejle	Villy Søvndal	24 October 2006	30 October 2006	6 days
Gudrun Laub	1941	V Liberals	Nordjylland	Inge-Lene Ebdrup	14 November 2006	1 June 2007	199 days
Pia Olsen Dyhr	1971	F Socialist People's Party	Frederiksborg	Poul Henrik Hedeboe	28 November 2006	15 December 2006	17 days
Marianne Saxtoft		B Social Liberal Party	Århus	Morten Østergaard	22 January 2007	28 January 2007	6 days
Pernille Frahm	1954	F Socialist People's Party	Århus	Morten Homann	20 February 2007	1 June 2007	101 days
Henrik Brodersen	1964	O Danish People's Party	Vestsjælland	Mia Falkenberg	13 March 2007	28 May 2007	76 days
Sanne Schroll		F Socialist People's Party	Fyn	Anne Baastrup	20 March 2007	4 April 2007	15 days
Sofia Rossen	1961	IA Community of the People	Greenland	Kuupik Kleist	10 April 2007	1 June 2007	52 days
Simon Pihl Sørensen	1966	A Social Democrats	København	Karen Hækkerup	10 April 2007	1 June 2007	52 days
Per Dalgaard	1944	O Danish People's Party	Århus	Morten Messerschmidt	16 April 2007	22 April 2007	6 days
Marie Fugl		F Socialist People's Party	Østre	Anne Grete Holmsgaard	8 May 2007	14 May 2007	6 days
Jens Jørgen Nygaard	1948	C Conservatives	København	Charlotte Dyremose	8 May 2007	1 June 2007	24 days
Jørn Pedersen	1947	A Social Democrats	Århus	Torben Hansen	8 May 2007	14 May 2007	6 days
Jens Borking		Ø Red-Green Alliance	Østre	Pernille Rosenkrantz-Theil	2 October 2007	24 October 2007	22 days
Jesper Kiel	1966	Ø Red-Green Alliance	Fyn	Rune Lund	2 October 2007	11 October 2007	9 days
Jens Jørgen Nygaard	1948	C Conservatives	København	Charlotte Dyremose	2 October 2007	23 October 2007	21 days
Abbas Razvi	1948	B Social Liberal Party	København	Elisabeth Geday	2 October 2007	12 October 2007	10 days
