= Edmund Joensen =

Faroese politician

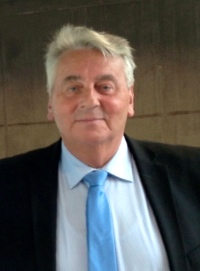

Prime Minister of the Faroe Islands
- In office 15 September 1994 – 15 May 1998
- Deputy: Jóannes Eidesgaard
- Preceded by: Marita Petersen
- Succeeded by: Anfinn Kallsberg

Speaker of the Løgting
- In office 2002–2008
- Preceded by: Finnbogi Ísakson
- Succeeded by: Hergeir Nielsen

Member of the Folketing
- In office 5 June 2019 – 31 October 2022
- Constituency: Faroe Islands
- In office 13 November 2007 – 18 June 2015
- Constituency: Faroe Islands
- In office 21 September 1994 – 11 March 1998
- Constituency: Faroe Islands

Member of the Løgting
- In office 17 November 1988 – 29 October 2011
- In office 1 September 2015 – 31 August 2019

Leader of Sambandsflokkurin
- In office 1991–2001

Personal details
- Born: Edmund Esbern Johannes Joensen; 19 September 1944 (age 82) Oyri, Eysturoy, British-occupied Faroe Islands
- Party: Sambandsflokkurin
- Spouse: Edfríð Joensen (née Johannesen)
- Relatives: Anna Falkenberg (granddaughter)

Edmund Esbern Johannes Joensen (born 19 September 1944) is a Faroese politician, who was the Prime Minister of the Faroe Islands from 1994 to 1998. From 2015 to 2022 served as a member of the Danish Folketing, being one of two Faroese seats in parliament. He did not stand in the 2022 Danish general election and his granddaughter Anna Falkenberg replaced him as Member of the Folketing for the Union Party of which Joensen is a member.

== Political career ==
He was first elected to the Løgting in 1988, and remained in parliament until 2011. He was prime minister from 1994 to 1998, speaker of the parliament from 2002 to 2008, and member of the Danish Folketing from 1994 to 1998 and again from 2007 to 2015, and again from 2019. The Faroe Islands elect two members to the Danish Folketing. He returned to the Løgting from 2015 to 2019.

Political offices
Preceded by Marita Petersen	Prime Minister of the Faroe Islands; 1994-1998	Succeeded by Anfinn Kallsberg
