= Frevert =

Frevert is a surname. Notable people with the surname include:

- Louise Frevert (born 1953), Danish politician
- Marcella Frevert (born 1937), American
- Tommy Frevert (born 1986), American football player
- Ute Frevert (born 1954), German Historian

== See also ==
- 5137 Frevert, main-belt asteroid
