= Hegaard =

Hegaard is a surname. Notable people with the surname include:

- Kristian Hegaard (born 1991), Danish politician
- Lars Hegaard (born 1950), Danish composer and guitarist
