= List of Faroese members of the Folketing =

This is a list of Faroese members of the Folketing, the parliament of Denmark. Under the 1953 Constitution, the Faroe Islands elect two members of the Folketing. From 1849 to 1953 the Folketing was one of the two houses in the bicameral parliament known as the Rigsdag; the other house was known as the Landsting. Greenland also elects two members of the Folketing, which alongside the Faroese members are called the North Atlantic mandates (da).

== The Folketing before 1953 ==
Name	Party	Associated with	Period	Comments
Niels Christopher Winther	Independent		1851–1857	
Enok Bærentsen	Independent		1857–1858	
Hans Christopher Müller	Independent		1858–1864	
Johannes Petersen	Independent		1864–1866	
Jacob Andreas Lunddahl	Independent		1866–1869	
Oliver Petræus Effersøe	Independent		1869–1872	
Bærent Bærentsen	Independent		1872–1884	
Johan Henrik Schrøter	Independent		1884–1887	
Hans Christopher Müller	Independent		1887–1890	
Thomas Thomsen	Independent		1890–1898	
Klæmint Olsen	Independent		1898–1901	
Jóannes Patursson	Independent	Venstrereformpartiet	1901–1906	
Oliver Effersøe	Union Party	Venstre	1906–1913	Venstrereformpartiet before 1909
Andrass Samuelsen	Union Party	Venstre	1913–1915	
Edward Mitens	Self-Government Party		1915–1918	
Andrass Samuelsen	Union Party	Venstre	1918–1939	
Johan Poulsen	Union Party	Venstre	1939–1943	
Thorstein Petersen	People's Party	Conservative People's Party	1943–1950	Abstained after 1947
Peter Mohr Dam	Social Democratic Party	Social Democrats	1948–1953	
Johan Poulsen	Union Party	Venstre	1950–1953	

== The Landsting before 1953 ==
Name	Party	Associated with	Period	Comments
Johan Hendrik Weihe	Independent		1851–1853	
Carl Emil Dahlerup	Independent		1855–1863	
Peter Holten	Independent		1862–1865	
Andreas Christian Lützen	Independent		1863–1864	
Hans Christopher Müller	Independent		1865–1886	
Harald Emil Høst	Independent		1884–1890	
Klæmint Olsen	Independent		1886–1894	
Fríðrikur Petersen	Independent		1894–1902	
Christian Bærentsen	Independent	Venstrereformpartiet	1902–1906	
Fríðrikur Petersen	Union Party	Venstre	1906–1914	
Oliver Effersøe	Union Party	Venstre	1914–1915	
Fríðrikur Petersen	Union Party	Venstre	1915–1917	
Andrass Samuelsen	Union Party	Venstre	1916–1917	Substitute
Jóannes Patursson	Self-Government Party	Radikale Venstre	1918–1920	
Oliver Effersøe	Union Party	Venstre	1920–1928	
Jóannes Patursson	Self-Government Party	Not associated with any Danish party	1928–1936	
Oliver Effersøe	Union Party	Venstre	1929–1933	
Oliver Effersøe	Union Party	Venstre	1936–1953	Died in 1953
Hans Iversen	Union Party	Venstre	1953	Substitute

== The Folketing after 1953 ==
Name	Party	Associated with	Period	Comments
Johan Poulsen	Union Party	Venstre	1953–1964	
Peter Mohr Dam	Social Democratic Party	Social Democrats	1953–1957	
Hákun Djurhuus	People's Party	Conservative People's Party	1957–1960	
Johan Nielsen	Social Democratic Party	Social Democrats	1960–1964	
Peter Mohr Dam	Social Democratic Party	Social Democrats	1964–1967	
Poul Andreasen	People's Party	Conservative People's Party	1964–1968	
Johan Nielsen	Social Democratic Party	Social Democrats	1967–1984	Substitute
Hákun Djurhuus	People's Party	Conservative People's Party	1968–1973	
Erlendur Patursson	Republic	Not associated with any Danish party	1973–1977	
Pauli Ellefsen	Union Party	Venstre	1977–1987	
Jacob Lindenskov	Social Democratic Party	Social Democrats	1979–1984	
Johannes Martin Olsen	Union Party	Venstre	1979–1998	Substitute
Óli Breckmann	People's Party	Conservative People's Party	1984–2001	
Atli Dam	Social Democratic Party	Social Democrats	1987–1988	
Jacob Lindenskov	Social Democratic Party	Social Democrats	1987–1988	Substitute for Atli Dam
Pauli Ellefsen	Union Party	Venstre	1988–1990	
Atli Dam	Social Democratic Party	Social Democrats	1990–1994	
Jacob Lindenskov	Social Democratic Party	Social Democrats	1990–1993	Substitute
Edmund Joensen	Union Party	Venstre	1994–1998	
Jóannes Eidesgaard	Social Democratic Party	Social Democrats	1998–2001	
Høgni Hoydal	Republic	The North Atlantic Group	2001–2011	
Lisbeth L. Petersen	Union Party	Venstre	2001–2005	
Tórbjørn Jacobsen	Republic	The North Atlantic Group	2001–2004	Substitute for Høgni Hoydal
Anfinn Kallsberg	People's Party	Conservative People's Party	2005–2007	
Edmund Joensen	Union Party	Venstre	2007–2022	
Sjúrður Skaale	Republic	The North Atlantic Group	2007–2008	Substitute
Annita á Fríðriksmørk	Tjóðveldi	The North Atlantic Group	2008	Substitute for Høgni Hoydal
Sjúrður Skaale	Social Democratic Party	Social Democrats	2011–	
Anna Falkenberg	Union Party	Venstre	2022–	
