= Anna Falkenberg =

Faroese politician (born 1996)

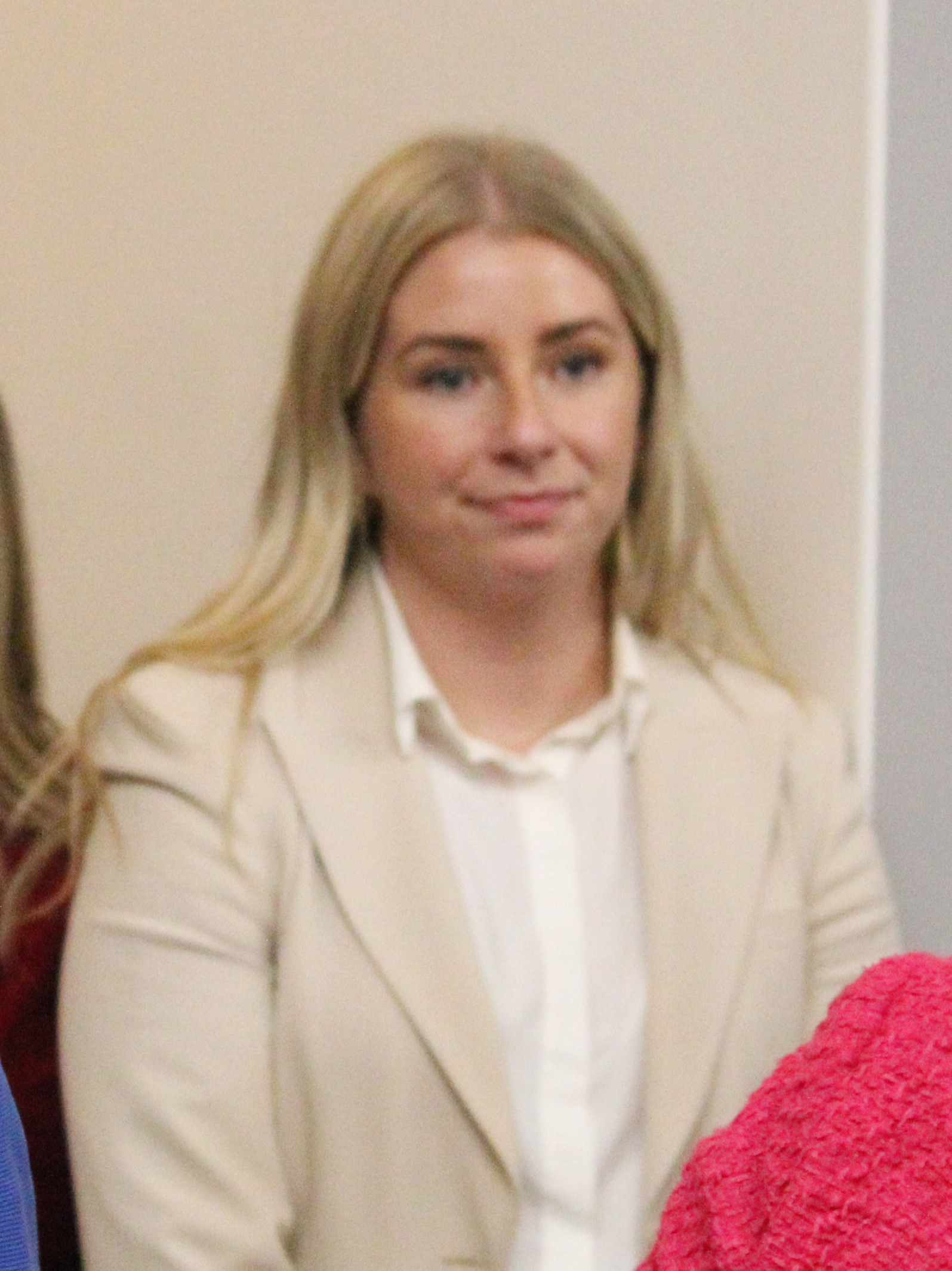
- Falkenberg in 2026

Member of the Folketing
- Incumbent
- Assumed office 1 November 2022
- Preceded by: Edmund Joensen
- Constituency: Faroe Islands

Personal details
- Born: 4 January 1996 (age 30) Oyri, Faroe Islands
- Party: Union Party
- Relatives: Edmund Joensen (grandfather)
- Education: University of Copenhagen

Anna Falkenberg (born 4 January 1996) is a Faroese politician who has been serving as Member of the Folketing for the Union Party since 1 November 2022 where she was elected as part of the 2022 Danish general election. Falkenberg is the second ever Faroese woman to be elected to the Danish parliament.

== Career and education ==
Falkenberg graduated from the University of Copenhagen with a Master's degree in political science.

Falkenberg began her career in 2019 as a political advisor to her grandfather and Member of the Folketing Edmund Joensen. In November 2022, she replaced Joensen, who did not stand, as Member of the Folketing for the Faroe Islands after receiving 2,973 personal votes in the 2022 Danish general election. She has stated a desire to increase Faroese influence on foreign policy.
