= Cabinet of Anfinn Kallsberg I =

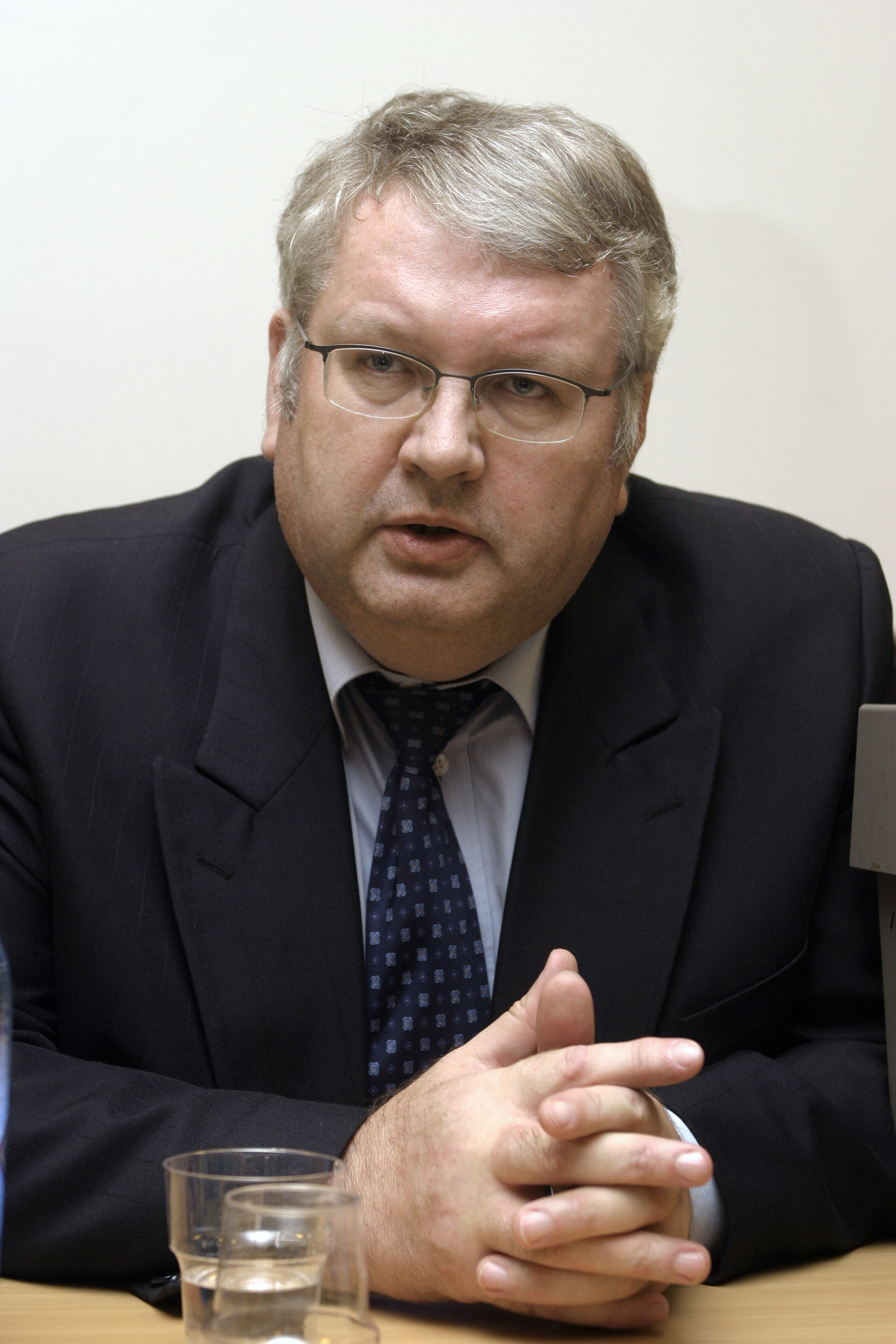
Anfinn Kallsberg.jpg

The first cabinet of Anfinn Kallsberg was the government of the Faroe Islands from 15 May 1998 until 6 June 2002. It was a coalition with Anfinn Kallsberg from the People's Party (Fólkaflokkurin) as Prime Minister, consisting of People's Party, Republic and Self-Government Party.

	Minister	Party	From	Until
Prime Minister	Anfinn Kallsberg	People's Party	15 May 1998	6 June 2002
Deputy Prime Minister	Høgni Hoydal	Republic	15 May 1998	6 June 2002
Ministry	Minister	Party	From	Until
Ministry of Selfgoverning- and Justice	Høgni Hoydal	Republic	15 May 1998	6 June 2002
Ministry of Fisheries	Jørgen Niclasen	People's Party	14 December 1998	6 June 2002
	John Petersen	People's Party	15 May 1998	14 December 1998
Ministry of Culture and Teaching	Óli Holm	Republic	14 June 2001	6 June 2002
	Tórbjørn Jacobsen	Republic	28 March 2000	14 June 2001
	Signar á Brúnni	Republic	15 May 1998	21 July 2000
Ministry of Finance and Economy	Karsten Hansen	Republic	15 May 1998	6 June 2002
Ministry of Trade and Industry	Bjarni Djurholm	People's Party	28 August 2000	6 June 2002
	Finnbogi Arge	People's Party	15 May 1998	18 August 2000
Ministry of Oil- and Environment	Eyðun Elttør	Self-Governing Party	15 May 1998	6 June 2002
Ministry of Social Affairs and Health	Sámal Petur í Grund	Self-Governing Party	26 February 2001	6 June 2002
	Helena Dam á Neystabø	Self-Governing Party	15 May 1998	26 February 2001
