= Faroe Islands (Folketing constituency) =

Constituency of the Folketing, the national legislature of Denmark

- Føroyar; Færøerne
- Constituency for the Folketing
- Location of Faroe Islands within Kingdom of Denmark
- Territory: Faroe Islands
- Population: 55,177 (2026)
- Electorate: 38,955 (2026)

Current constituency
- Created: 1850
- Seats: List: 2 (1947–present); 1 (1850-1947)
- Members of the Folketing: List: Sjúrður Skaale (C); Anna Falkenberg (B)
- Local council: Løgting

Faroe Islands is one of the 12 multi-member constituencies of the Folketing, the national legislature of Denmark. The constituency elects two North Atlantic mandates. The constituency represents the Faroe Islands between the North Sea and the Atlantic Ocean.

== 2026 ==
2026 Danish general election:

Party	Top candidate	Votes	%	Seats
Social Democratic Party	Sjúrður Skaale	13,088	44.9	1
Union Party	Anna Falkenberg	7,342	25.2	1
People's Party	Jørgen Niclasen	4,383	15.0	0
Republic	Høgni Hoydal	3,891	13.4	0
Centre Party	Steffan Klein Poulsen	437	1.5	0
Total		29,141	100	2
Turnout			75.4	

== 2022 ==
2022 Danish general election:

Party		Candidate	Total Votes	%	Seats
Union Party	B	Anna Falkenberg	8,198	30.2%	1
Social Democratic Party	C	Sjúrður Skaale	7,659	28.2%	1
Republic	E	Bjørt Samuelsen	4,927	18.1%	0
People's Party	A	Jógvan á Lakjuni	4,222	15.5%	0
Centre Party	H	Jenis av Rana	1,217	4.5%	0
Progress	F		936	3.4%	0
Valid Votes		27,159	100.00%	2	
Turnout		71.3%			

== 2019 ==
2019 Danish general election:

Elected in the Faroe Islands
Union	Bárður á Steig Nielsen	28.8%
Social Democratic	Aksel V. Johannesen	25.5%

== See also ==
- List of Faroese members of the Folketing
- Constituencies of Denmark
