= Marita Petersen =

Prime Minister of the Faroe Islands 1993–1994 (1940–2001)

Prime Minister of the Faroe Islands
- In office 18 January 1993 – 15 September 1994
- Preceded by: Atli Pætursson Dam
- Succeeded by: Edmund Joensen

Personal details
- Born: 21 October 1940 Vágur, Suðuroy, British-occupied Faroe Islands
- Died: 26 August 2001 (aged 60) Tórshavn, Faroe Islands
- Party: Føroya Javnaðarflokkurin
- Spouse: Kári Petersen
- Profession: Teacher

Marita Petersen (Faroese pronunciation: [ˌmɛaɹɪta ˈpʰeːʰtɛɹsɛn]) (née Johansen (Faroese pronunciation: [ˌjoˈhan̥ːsɛn]); 21 October 1940 – 26 August 2001) was the first and to date only female prime minister of the Faroe Islands and the first female speaker of the Løgting (Parliament). She was elected to the Løgting in 1988 for Javnaðarflokkurin (The Social Democratic Party). In January 1993, she was elected to the post of prime minister, which she held until September 1994. Later, she became chairman of the parliament from 1994 to 1995. She was Prime Minister of the Faroe Islands in a very difficult time with economic crisis. Marita Petersen died of cancer in 2001.

== Career ==
=== Early life ===
Petersen was born in Vágur. She was educated at the Hellerup seminarium in Denmark, and trained as a teacher in 1964. She worked as a teacher in Copenhagen and Esbjerg from 1964 to 1967, in Tórshavnar kommunuskúli (one of the public schools in Tórshavn) from 1967 to 1989. From 1989 to 1994 she was leader of the teaching department of Landsskúlafyrisitingin 1989–94, leader of the Sernámsfrøðiliga ráðgevingin 1994-98 and from 1998 until her death she was manager for the Sernámsdepilin, which is a school for children with mental disabilities.

=== Political career ===
- 1994-1995 Speaker of the Løgting
- 1993-1994 Prime minister (løgmaður) (the first and until now the only female prime minister of the Faroe Islands)
- 1994-1996 Leader of Javnaðarflokkurin (the Socialist Party)
- 1991-1993 Minister of Cultural Affairs
- 1988-1998 Member of the Faroese Løgting, except for the periods when she was prime minister or minister

Political offices
Preceded by Atli Dam	Prime Minister of the Faroe Islands; 1993–1994	Succeeded by Edmund Joensen
