= Elisabeth Geday =

Danish politician

Member of the Danish Parliament
- In office 2005–2007

Personal details
- Born: 30 November 1965 (age 60)
- Party: Danish Social Liberal Party

Elisabeth Geday (born 30 November 1965) is a Danish politician who was a member of the Danish Parliament for the Danish Social Liberal Party from 2005 to 2007. Elisabeth Geday holds a Master of Science in Political Science. She lives in Virum, is married and has three children.

== See also ==
- List of members of the Folketing, 2005–2007
