= Søren Egge Rasmussen =

Danish politician

Member of the Folketing
- Incumbent
- Assumed office 18 June 2015
- Constituency: East Jutland

Personal details
- Born: 2 July 1961 (age 64) Fussingsø, Denmark
- Party: Red–Green Alliance

Søren Egge Rasmussen (born 2 July 1961) is a Danish politician, serving as a member of the Folketing for the Red–Green Alliance political party. He was elected at the 2015 Danish general election, and again re-elected in the 2022 Danish general election.

== Political career ==
Rasmussen was a member of the municipal council of Aarhus Municipality from 1994 to 2001. On three occasions he served as substitute member of the Folketing. His first period as a substitute was from 23 to 30 May in 2002, substituting for Keld Albrechtsen. The next two substitute periods were as replacement for Frank Aaen: from 23 December to 18 December 2005 and from 21 March to 18 April 2006.

Rasmussen ran in the 2015 general election and was elected on a levelling seat, receiving 1,124 votes. In the 2019 election he received 1,453, which was initially not enough for a seat in parliament, but made him the party's primary substitute in the constituency. However the elected politician Nikolaj Villumsen had already been elected to the European Parliament, and declined to also take the seat in the Folketing. That made Rasmussen the elected politician instead, securing him re-election. An initial miscount caused Rasmussen to believe he had lost his seat, but he was later confirmed to have retained it.
