= Tanja Larsson =

Danish politician (born 1977)

Member of the Folketing
- Incumbent
- Assumed office 1 October 2019
- Constituency: Zealand

Personal details
- Born: 7 July 1977 (age 48) Haslev, Denmark
- Party: Social Democrats

Tanja Larsson (born 7 July 1977) is a Danish politician, who is a member of the Folketing for the Social Democrats political party. She entered parliament on 1 October 2019 as a replacement for Henrik Sass Larsen after he resigned his seat.

== Political career ==
Larsson ran in the 2019 Danish general election, where she received 4,197 votes. This was not enough for her to get elected, but she became the Social Democrats' primary substitute in the Zealand constituency. When Henrik Sass Larsen resigned his seat in parliament on 1 October 2019, Larsson replaced him and took over the seat.
