= Susanne Eilersen =

Danish politician (born 1964)

Member of the Folketing
- In office 18 June 2015 – 5 June 2019
- Constituency: South Jutland

Personal details
- Born: 24 August 1964 (age 61) Grenaa, Denmark
- Party: Danish People's Party

Susanne Eilersen (born 24 August 1964 in Grenaa) is a Danish politician, who was a member of the Folketing for the Danish People's Party from 2015 to 2019.

== Political career ==
In the 2009 Danish local elections Eilersen was elected in the municipal council of Fredericia Municipality. From 2014 to 2015 she sat in the regional council of Region of Southern Denmark. Her first parliamentary work was as a substitute member of the Folketing from 10 March to 27 May 2015, substituting for Anita Christensen. She was elected into parliament on her own mandate at the 2015 Danish general election. She did not get reelected in 2019. She was a substitute member again from 30 October to 15 November 2019, substituting for Marie Krarup.
