= Susan Kronborg =

Danish politician

Member of the Folketing
- Incumbent
- Assumed office 17 June 2021
- Constituency: East Jutland

Personal details
- Born: 5 July 1968 (age 57) Seoul, South Korea
- Party: Social Liberal Party

Susan Kronborg (born 5 July 1968 in Seoul) is a South Korean-Danish politician, who is a member of the Folketing for the Social Liberal Party. She entered parliament on 17 June 2021 after Morten Østergaard resigned his seat.

== Political career ==
Kronborg ran in the 2019 Danish general election, where she received 1,522 votes. This was not enough to get elected into parliament, but she became the Social Liberal Party's primary substitute in the East Jutland constituency. Kronborg substituted for Morten Østergaard from 10 November 2021 until 16 June 2021, until Morten Østergaard resigned his seat. From 17 June 2021 she entered parliament as a lasting member, replacing Morten Østergaard and taking over his seat.
