= Mia Falkenberg =

Danish politician

Member of the Folketing
- In office 8 February 2005 – 8 October 2008
- Constituency: West Zealand County Constituency (2005-2007); Greater Zealand Constituency (2007-2008)

Personal details
- Born: 20 September 1983 (age 42) Zealand University Hospital, Roskilde
- Party: Danish People's Party

Mia Falkenberg (born 20 September 1983) is a Danish politician and former member of the Danish Parliament for the Danish People's Party. Mia Falkenberg is a social and health worker.

She was elected at the age of 21 in the 2005 Danish general election for the Vestsjællands County Constituency (Vestsjællands Amtskreds) and served in the Folketing from 8 February 2005 to 8 October 2008, when she had to resign due to illness. She was nominated in the Nykøbing Sjælland constituency 2004-2006 and in the Guldborgsund constituency 2007–2008. As a member of the parliamentary group, she was the spokesperson for family and consumers, the spokesperson for the Økontaktudvalget and the spokesperson for equality and a member of the Housing and Social Affairs Committees.

Mia Falkenberg is married to Per Brogård, Falkenberg previously spent three months in the Danish Defence with the combat troops in Slagelse and later studied theology.

== Sources ==
- Biography at Folketing
- "Profil på DF's hjemmeside". Archived from the original on 22 August 2007.
- Gammelt portrætfoto
