= Christian Mejdahl =

Danish politician

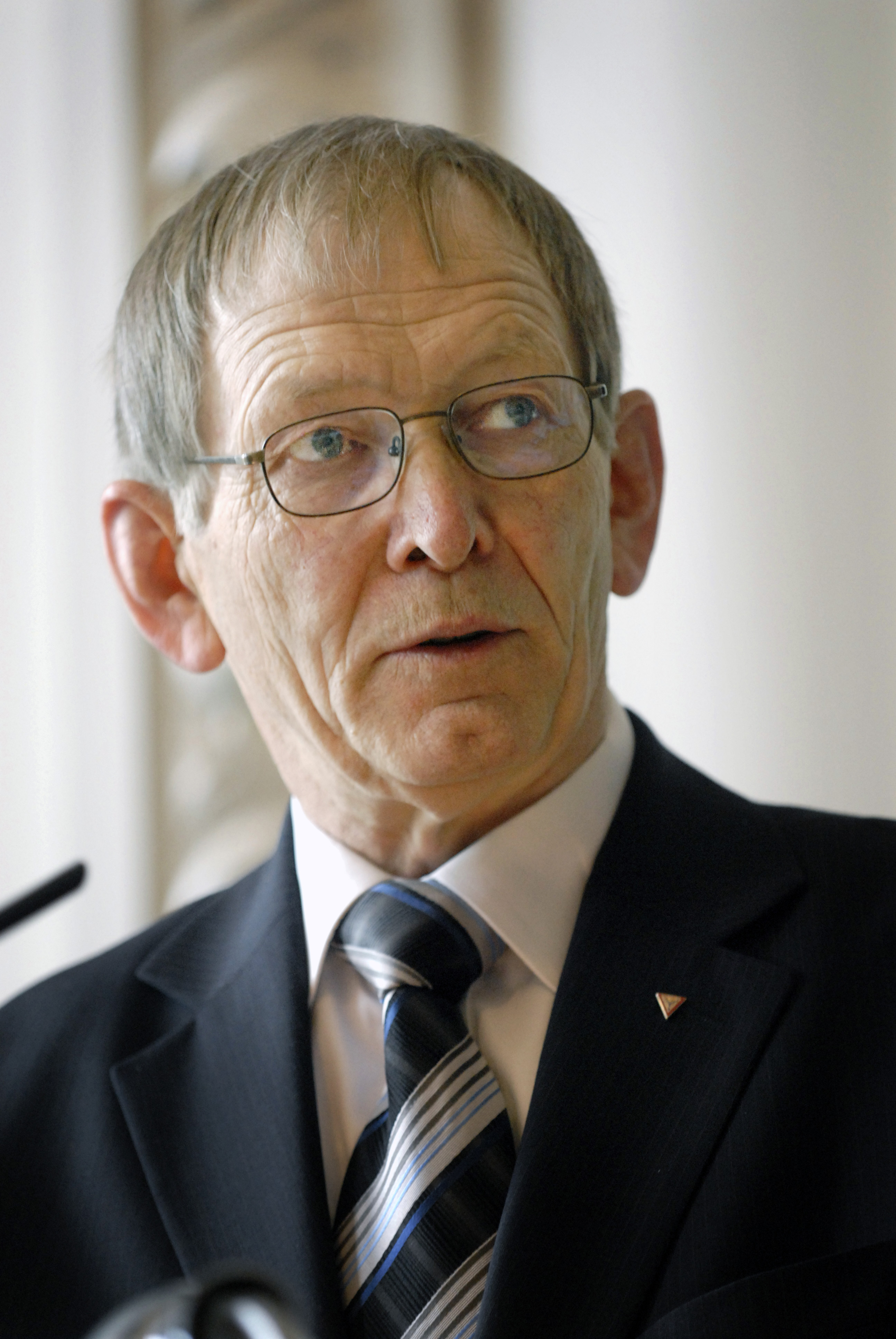
- Christian Mejdahl

Speaker of the Folketing
- In office 18 March 2003 – 13 November 2007
- Monarch: Margrethe II
- Preceded by: Ivar Hansen
- Succeeded by: Thor Pedersen

Member of Parliament for Aars
- In office 9 September 1987 – 13 November 2007

Personal details
- Born: 31 December 1939 (age 86) Tvøroyri, Faroe Islands
- Party: Venstre
- Occupation: Farmer

Christian Mejdahl (born 31 December 1939 at Tvøroyri in the Faroe Islands) is a Danish politician representing the liberal party, Venstre. He was a Member of Parliament—the Folketing—from 9 September 1987 to 13 November 2007, and served as Speaker of the Folketing from 18 March 2003.

He lives in Løgstør in Himmerland.

Political offices
Preceded by Ivar Hansen	Speaker of the Folketing; 18 March 2003 – 13 November 2007	Succeeded by Thor Pedersen
