= Anfinn Kallsberg =

Faroese politician (1947–2024)

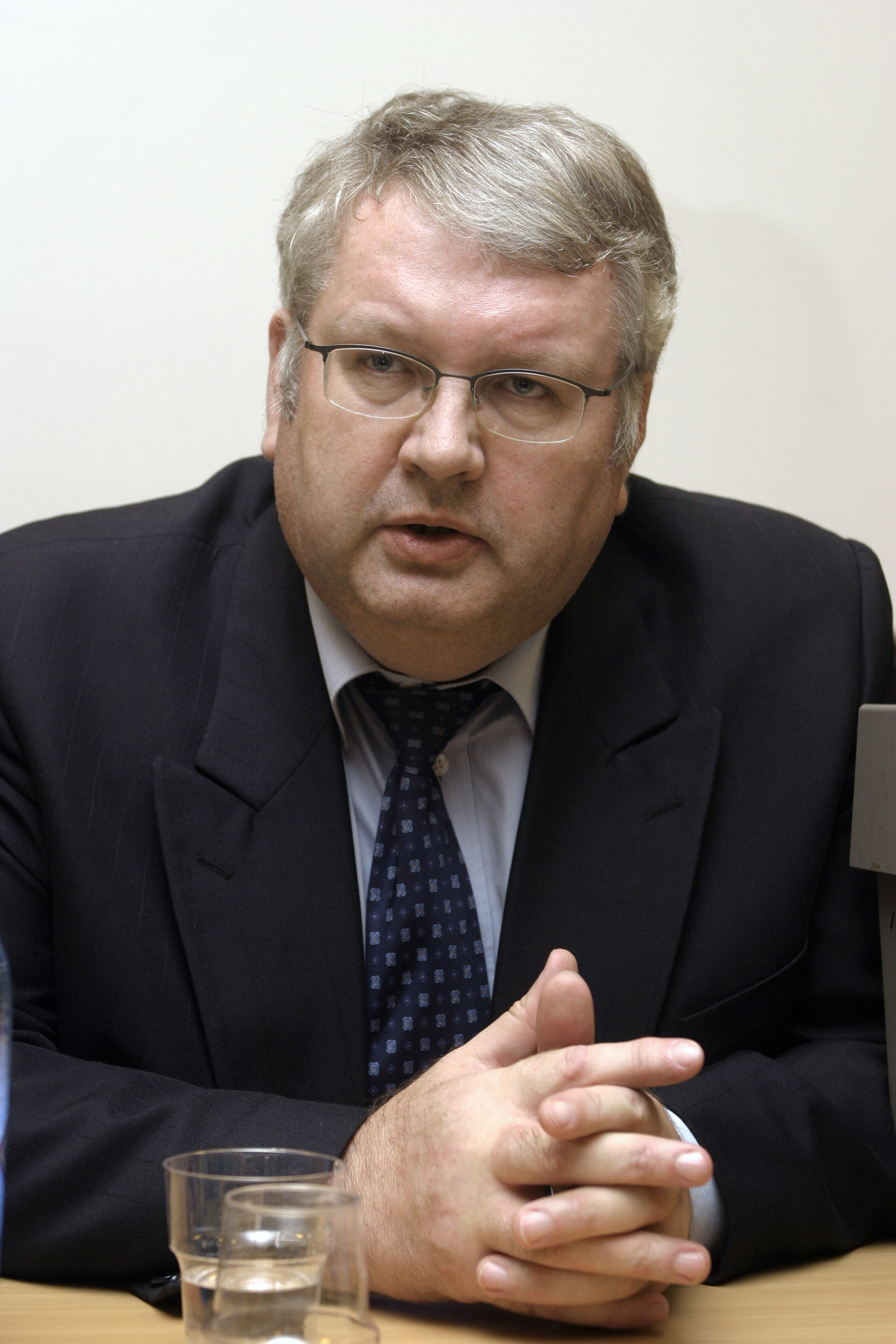

Prime Minister of the Faroe Islands
- In office 15 May 1998 – 3 February 2004
- Preceded by: Edmund Joensen
- Succeeded by: Jóannes Eidesgaard

Personal details
- Born: 19 November 1947 Klaksvík, Faroe Islands, Kingdom of Denmark
- Died: 20 February 2024 (aged 76)
- Party: People's Party

Anfinn Kallsberg (19 November 1947 – 20 February 2024) was a Faroese politician who was prime minister and leader of the People's Party (Faroese: Fólkaflokkurin). First elected to the Faroese parliament in 1980 and consecutively thereafter, Kallsberg served as Fisheries Minister from 1983 to 1985 and for 5 months in Jógvan Sundstein's first coalition government in 1989, and as Economics and Finance Minister from 1996 to 1998 in a coalition led by Edmund Joensen (Union Party).

== Biography ==
Kallsberg was Speaker of the Løgting from 1991 to 1993.

Kallsberg became Prime Minister of the Faroe Islands on 15 May 1998 in a coalition formed by the People's Party, Republican Party and the Self-Government Party. His first administration aimed for economic and legal independence of the Faroe Islands and started a process of assuming various governmental sectors from the Danish government. Likewise, Denmark set up a plan to grant full sovereignty to the Faroe Islands. In 2002 the coalition went through parliamentary elections that resulted in the entry of the Center Party into the government, which was the second cabinet of Anfinn Kallsberg.

In December 2003, Kallsberg took over the ministries previously served by members of the Republican Party and issued a new election that took place in January 2004. In 2005 Kallsberg was elected as one of two Faroese citizens to represent the islands in the Danish Parliament.

Anfinn Kallsberg died on 20 February 2024, at the age of 76.

Political offices
Preceded by Edmund Joensen	Prime Minister of the Faroe Islands; 1998–2004	Succeeded by Jóannes Eidesgaard
