= Sjúrður Skaale =

Faroese politician

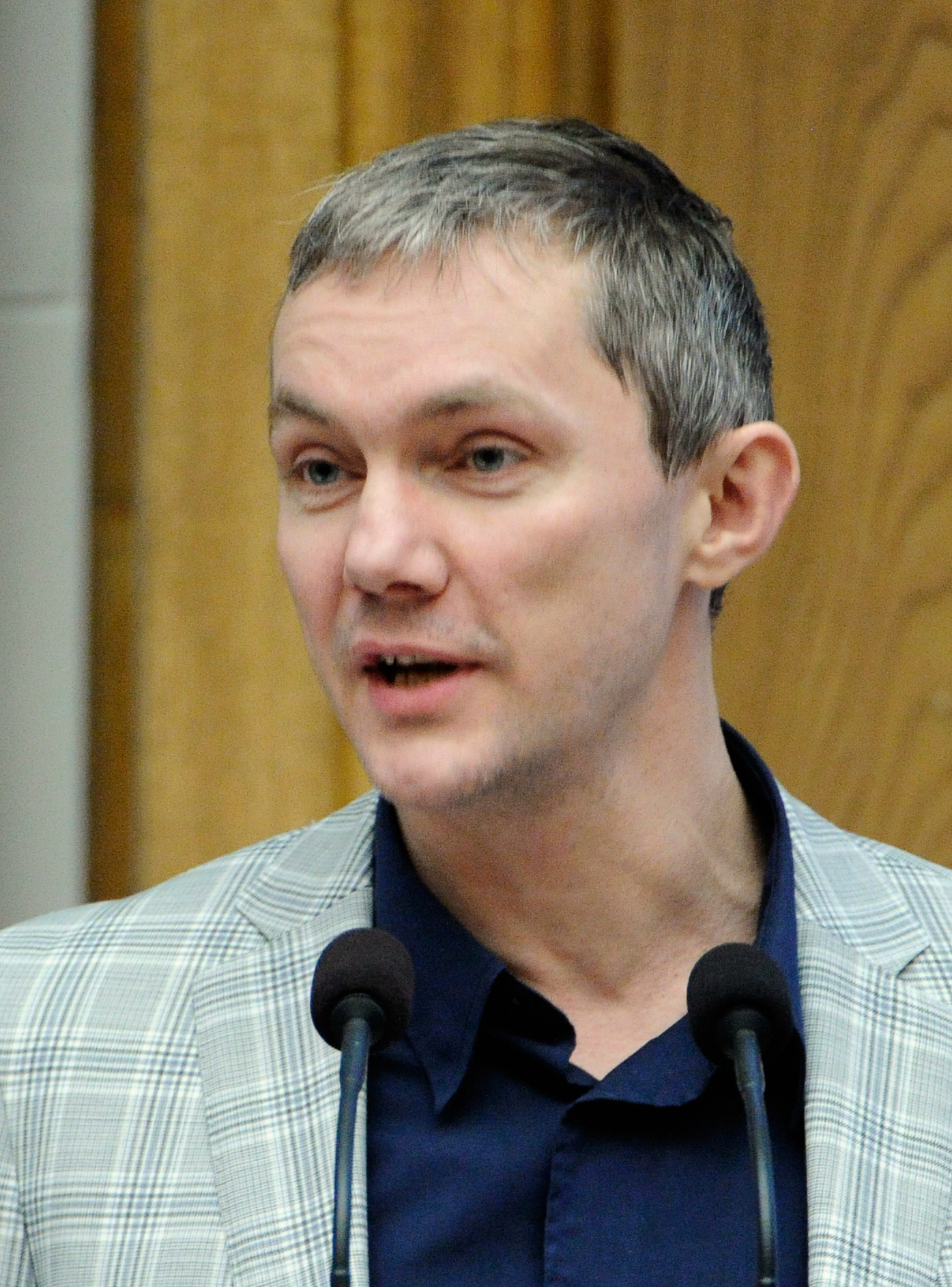

Member of the Folketing
- Incumbent
- Assumed office 15 September 2011
- Constituency: Faroe Islands

Member of the Løgting
- In office 19 January 2008 – 29 October 2011
- Constituency: Suðurstreymoy

Personal details
- Born: 8 March 1967 (age 59) Tórshavn, Faroe Islands, The Kingdom of Denmark
- Party: Social Democratic Party

Sjúrður Skaale (born 8 March 1967) is a Faroese politician, comedian and former journalist currently serving as one of the two Faroese members of the Folketing for the Social Democratic Party since 2011. From 2008 to 2011 he was a member of the Løgting.

== Background ==
He took his examen artium at Føroya Studentaskúli og HF-skeið in 1987, and obtained his Cand.polit. after studying political science in Copenhagen and Madrid. He also studied Spanish in Colombia and Copenhagen. Skaale worked at Tórshavnar Vatnverk 1987–1988, and was a journalist at Dimmalætting and Sosialurin 1989–1990, a journalist at Kringvarp Føroya 1996–1999, advisor for the Faroese Government 1999–2001 and secretary of The North Atlantic Group (Danish: Den Nordatlantiske Gruppe, Faroese: Norðuratlantsbólkurin) 2001–2005. From 2005–2008, he worked in the public sector, as a high school teacher and as an independent consultant in education.

== Entertainment career ==
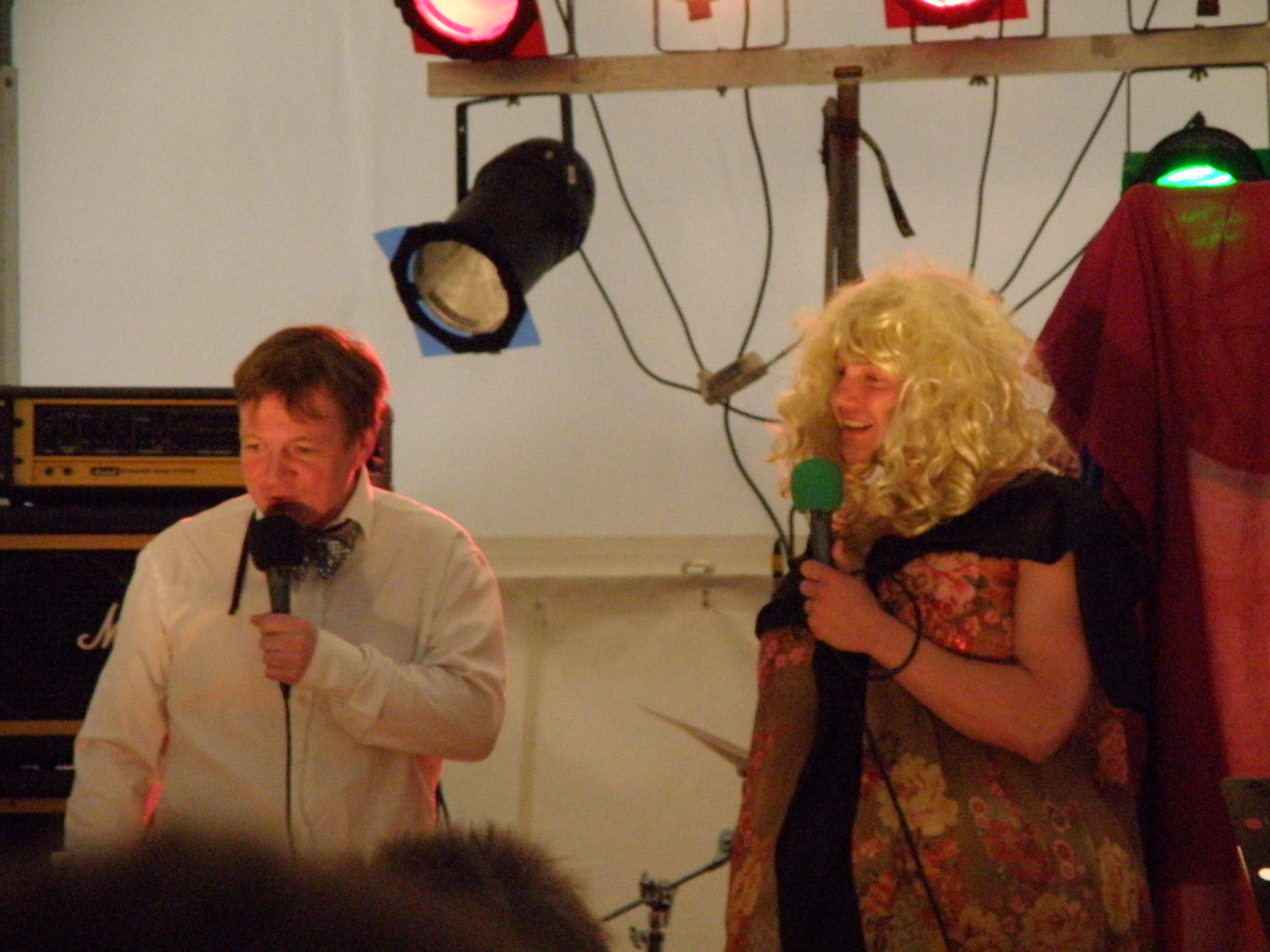
Jákup Veyhe (left) and Sjúrður Skaale (right, dressed as a woman) performing one of their Pipar & Salt (Pepper & Salt) comedies. Tvøroyri 2011.

Skaale has had a number of acting roles, but is best known for the comedy series Pipar & Salt, where he appeared with Jákup Veyhe, and for the lead in the comedy series E elski Førjar (2008). E elski Førjar means "I love the Faroe Islands", but it is misspelled on purpose, the correct spelling would be "Eg elski Føroyar". In both comedy series, he sang several songs, of which some became quite popular. Some of the songs which he sings:

From Pipar & Salt:

- Eg havi tað strævið (It Is Hard Work For Me) - as persona Esmar Eysturoy
- Lívið er oyðilagt, tá gentur fáa makt (Life Is Ruined When Girls Get Power), (James Olsen sings the refrain) the song makes joke about a man who is afraid of female power. He sings this song while acting as the character Kári Cool in the Pipar & Salt series
- Lat tey vita, ólavsøka er (Let Them Know That It Is Ólavsøka) sings together with Jákup Veyhe and others. The song makes joke about the economical crisis in the 1990s which was especially hard on the island Suðuroy.
- Jólagleði (christmas joy)

From E elski Førjar:

- Danskt pjatt (Danish Nonsense) - from the series "E elski førjar" in the role as a Faroese man named Haraldur. The song makes joke about this Faroese man who lives in Copenhagen, he is married to a Danish women but despises everything which is typical Danish and loves everything which is typical Faroese.
- Tað er lekkirt (It's Lovely)
- Tín innari gjeikari (Your Inner Gay Guy)

== Political career ==
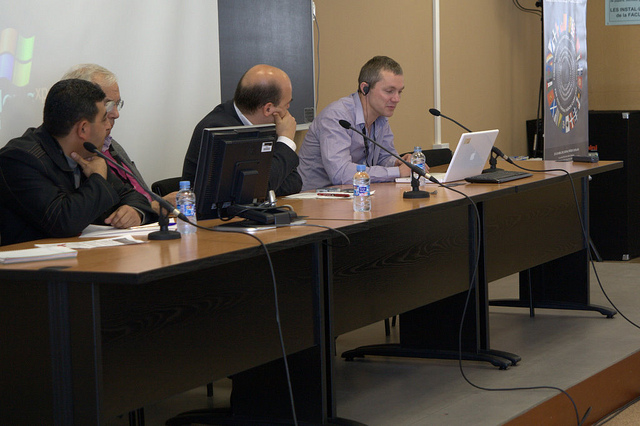
Mahmoud Saleh, Aureli Argemí, David Minoves and Sjurður Skaale at a conference in 2010.

He was a member of the Tjóðveldi (Republican Party) until 26 May 2011, and left after disagreements with the leader of the party and the other members of the Løgting from Tjóðveldi regarding their work with preparing a bill for a Faroese constitution (Faroese: Stjórnarskipanaruppskotið). Later that year, he joined Javnaðarflokkurin. Skaale was elected to the Løgting from 2008–2011, and was a member of the Committee on Cultural Affairs of the Løgting. He was also elected to the Danish Folketing 2007–2011, and covered for Høgni Hoydal from 19 February 2007 until 8 September 2008. The Faroe Islands has two members in the Danish Folketing. Skaale has been a member of the Folketing since 2011, and is the chairman of the Folketing's Faeroes group, part of Denmark's delegation to the Nordic Council and a member of the Folketing's foreign policy committee. Before the election to the Danish Folketing, Skaale and the Social Democratic Party promised the Faroese voters, that he and the other candidates of the party would not run for the Faroese Løgting as well, if they were elected, because they believed that it was impossible to be a full-time member of the Faroese parliament and a full-time member of the Danish Folketing at the same time. And Skaale kept his promise, he was not a candidate for the Faroese elections in 2011.

At the 2015 Danish general election Skaale was a candidate for Javnaðarflokkurin again; he received 2495 personal votes and became the top scorer of all candidates of all parties in the Faroe Islands and was one of two candidates who got elected.

Skaale was a candidate for the 2015 Faroese general election. He was not elected but ended as number 11 on his parties list, but because his party, Javnaðarflokkurin, formed government together with Tjóðveldi and Framsókn, four of the elected members of the Løgting took leave because they were elected ministers, and Skaale could have taken seat in the Faroese parliament for Rigmor Dam who became Minister of Finance. Javnaðarflokkurin's policy now forbids their members from being members of both parliaments simultaneously. Skaale can choose at some point to take leave from the Folketing in order to be a member of the Løgting, and during the electoral campaign he expressed that wish, because being full time and the whole time only in the Danish parliament distanced the Faroese members of the Folketing from what was going on in the Løgting.

In 2024, Skaale wrote in the Danish media outlet Jyllands-Posten that Paul Watson should be treated as "a violent man" and should remain in custody.
