= Christina Thorholm =

Danish politician (born 1964)

Member of the Folketing
- Incumbent
- Assumed office 31 August 2021
- Constituency: North Zealand

Personal details
- Born: 11 August 1964 (age 61)
- Party: Social Liberal Party

Christina Thorholm (born 11 August 1964) is a Danish politician, who is a member of the Folketing for the Social Liberal Party. She entered parliament on 31 August 2021 as a replacement for Kristian Hegaard after he resigned his seat.

== Political career ==
Thorholm has been a member of the municipal council of Hillerød Municipality since 2009. She ran in the 2019 Danish general election, where she received 1,524 votes. This was not enough for a seat in parliament, but she became the Social Liberal Party's primary substitute in the North Zealand constituency. Kristian Hegaard resigned his seat on 31 August 2021, following self-admitted offensive behavior while drunk at a party, and Thorholm took over his seat in parliament.
