= Orla Østerby =

Danish politician

Member of the Folketing
- Incumbent
- Assumed office 5 June 2019
- Constituency: West Jutland

Personal details
- Born: 29 February 1952 (age 74) Bækmarksbro, Denmark
- Party: Conservative People's Party (until 2020)

Orla Østerby (born 29 February 1952 in Bækmarksbro) is a Danish politician, who is a member of the Folketing. He was elected in the 2019 Danish general election as a member of Conservative People's Party. He left the party in December 2020 and has been an independent member of the Folketing since.

== Political career ==
Østerby was a substitute member of the Folketing from 15 December 2016 to 5 June 2019, substituting for Søren Pape Poulsen. In 2019 he was elected into parliament for the Conservative People's Party on his own mandate. He left the party on 4 December 2020 and continued in parliament as an independent politician.
