= Anne Grete Holmsgaard =

Danish politician (born 1948)

Personal details
- Born: 11 August 1948 (age 77) Odense, Denmark
- Party: Socialist People’s Party
- Other political affiliations: Left-Wing Socialist Party

Anne Grete Holmsgaard (born 11 August 1948) is a Danish energy expert and politician who served in the Parliament between 1979 and 2011 with an interruption from 1987 to 2001. She was first a member of the Left-Wing Socialist Party and then of the Socialist People’s Party.

== Biography ==
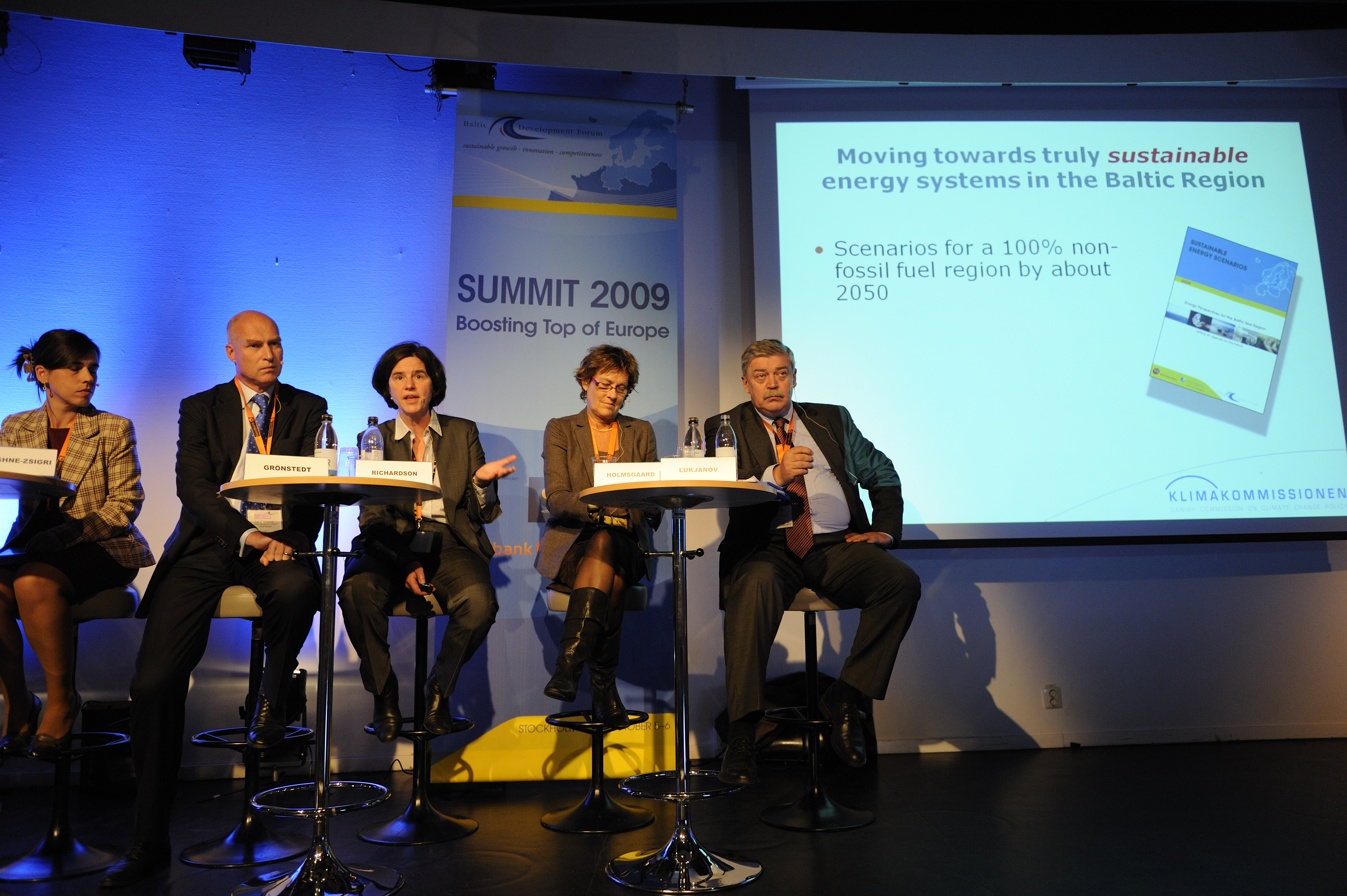
Holmsgaard (second from right) in the 2009 meeting New Energy Scenarios for the Baltic Sea Region

Holmsgaard was born in Odense on 11 August 1948. She graduated from a high school in 1967 and attended Roskilde University, but did not completed her graduate studies. She worked at the Danish State Railways between 1987 and 1995. Next she served as the director of the Technical University of Denmark until 2002.

She was first elected to the Parliament for the Left-Wing Socialist Party in October 1979 representing Funen County. From September 1986 she began to serve as a deputy for the Socialist People’s Party. Her last parliamentary membership for the party was between 13 November 2007 and 15 September 2011. On 11 July 1988 Holmsgaard was elected in the national congress as a member of the executive committee of the party. She held other posts in the party, including foreign affairs spokesman. As of 2020 she was the chair of the Energy Technology Development and Demonstration Program, a Danish sustainable energy fund.
