= Jens Rohde =

Danish politician (born 1970)

Jens Rohde MEP
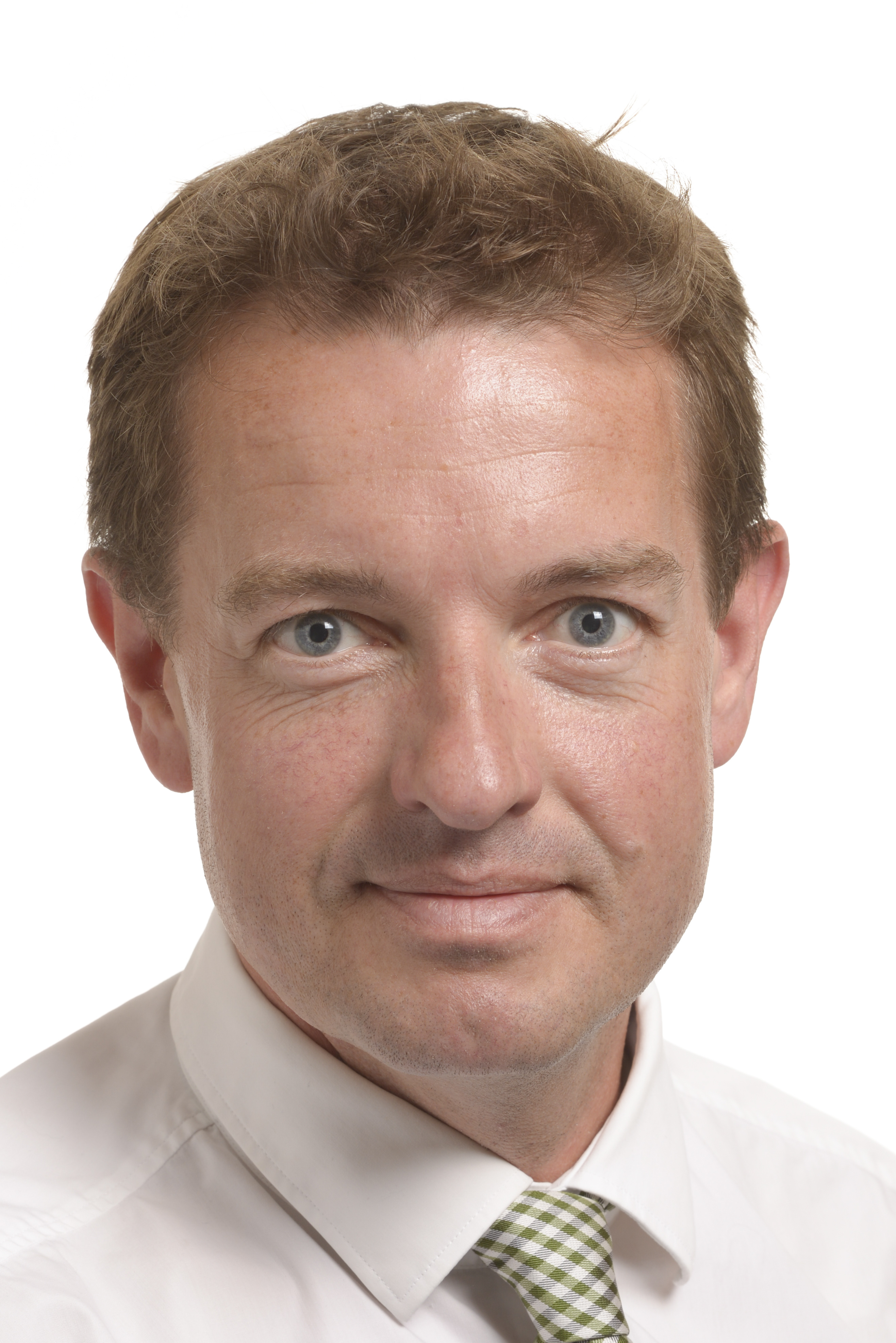

Member of the European Parliament
- In office 1 July 2014 – 2019
- Constituency: Denmark

Member of the Folketing
- Incumbent
- Assumed office 5 June 2019
- Constituency: Copenhagen
- In office 11 March 1998 – 9 January 2007
- Constituency: Søndre (2005—2007); Viborg (1998—2005)

Personal details
- Born: 18 April 1970 (age 56) Holstebro, Denmark
- Party: Christian Democrats (since 2021); Social Liberal Party (2015—2021); Venstre (1993—2015); Alliance of Liberals and Democrats for Europe (in EP)
- Spouse: Katrine Fusager
- Children: 3
- Education: Aalborg University

Jens Rohde (born 18 April 1970) is a Danish politician, who is a member of the Folketing for the Christian Democrats political party. He served as a Member of the European Parliament (MEP) from 2014 until 2019, as a member of the Danish Social Liberal Party, part of the Alliance of Liberals and Democrats for Europe. He is currently a member of the Christian Democrats.

== Political career ==
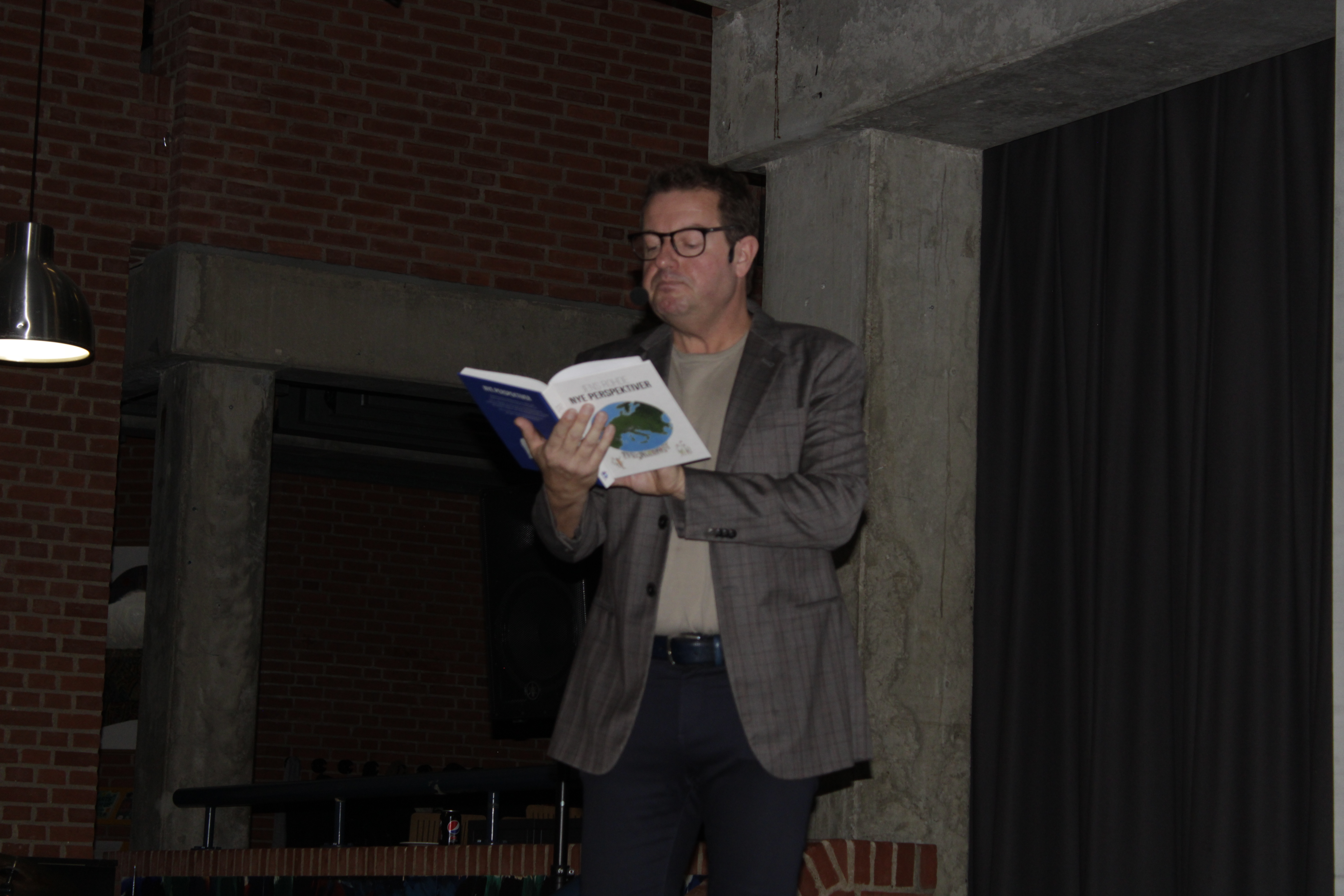
Jens Rohde during a lecture at Dronninglund Gymnasium in November 2023

Between 1998 and 2005, Rohde represented Venstre in the Danish parliament, where he served as his parliamentary group's spokesperson on media policy. From 2001 to 2005 he was a member of the municipal council of Viborg Municipality.

In the 2014 European elections, Rohde was elected as a member of European Parliament as a member of the Venstre political party. Rohde represented the ALDE group in Parliament. Between 2009 and 2014, he served as Vice-Chairman of the Committee on Industry, Research and Energy. From 2014, he was a member of the Committee on Agriculture and Rural Development, where served as the ALDE group's coordinator. In addition, he served as the ALDE group's shadow rapporteur for telecoms regulation.

In December 2015, Rohde moved to the Danish Social Liberal Party in protest at a proposal of the Rasmussen government to give immigration authorities the power to search asylum-seekers’ clothes and luggage and to seize valuables and cash. In January 2021 Rhode left the Social Liberal Party. He later joined the Christian Democrats, becoming that party's first sitting MP since 2010.
