= Kristian Hegaard =

Danish politician

Member of the Folketing
- In office 5 June 2019 – 30 August 2021
- Constituency: North Zealand

Personal details
- Born: 18 January 1991 (age 35) Frederiksberg, Denmark
- Party: Danish Social Liberal Party

Kristian Würtz Hegaard (born 18 January 1991 in Frederiksberg) is a Danish politician, who was a member of the Folketing for the Danish Social Liberal Party. He was elected into parliament at the 2019 Danish general election and the municipal council of Fredensborg Municipality in 2010. He resigned both seats in August 2021 due to self-admitted offensive behavior.

== Political career ==
Hegaard became the first proper member of the Folketing to be a wheelchair user. He was the second temporary Folketing member to be a wheelchair user, after Sarah Glerup. He was the substitute member for Martin Lidegaard from 18 April 2017 to 1 July 2017. In the 2019 general election Hegaard received 1,945 votes and was elected into parliament.

Hegaard was elected into the municipal council of Fredensborg Municipality in 2010.

In August 2021 Hegaard resigned his seats in the parliament and in the municipal council due to self-admitted offensive behavior while drunk at a party. Christina Thorholm took over his seat in parliament.
