= Henrik Sass Larsen =

Danish politician

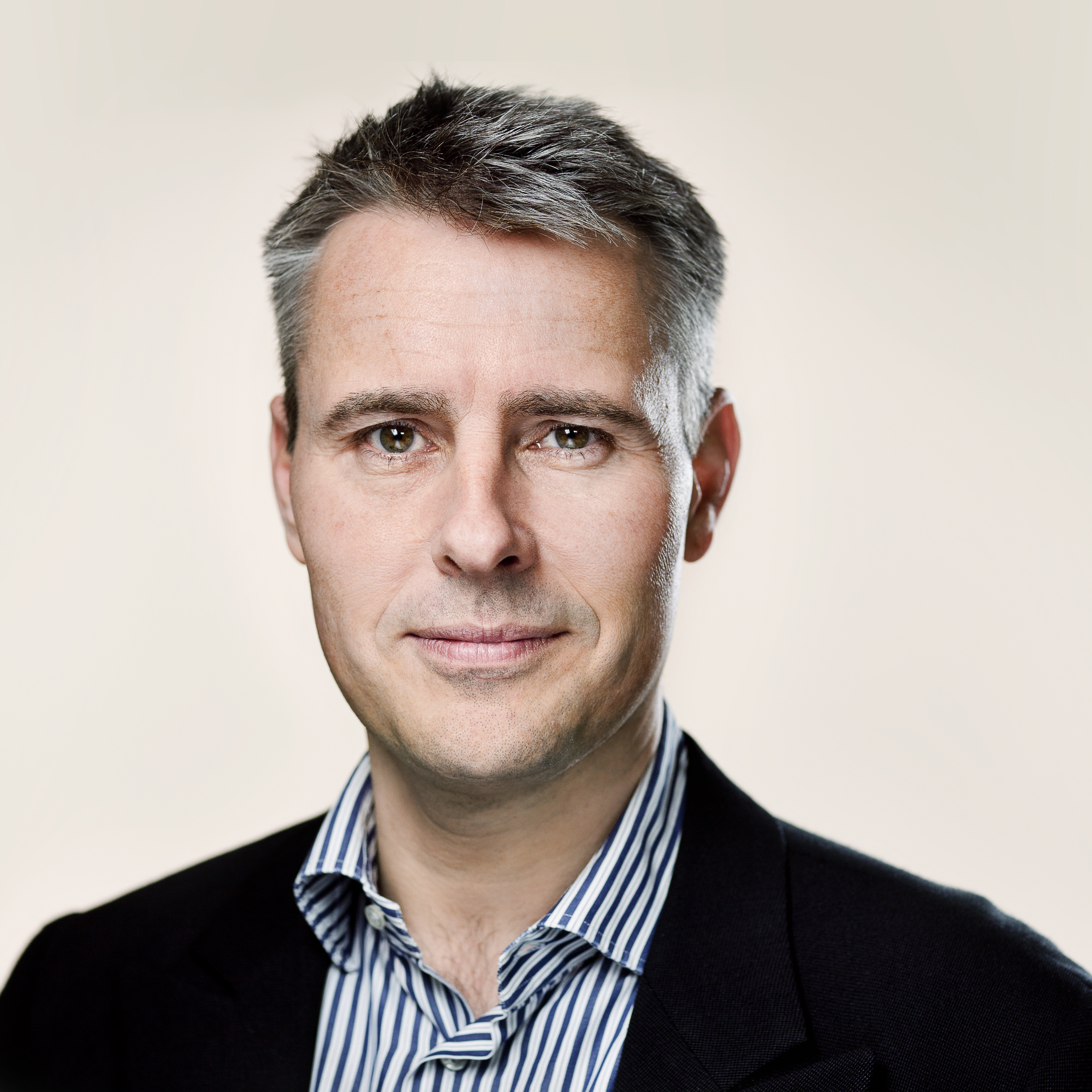
- Larsen in 2011

Minister of Business Affairs and Growth
- In office 9 August 2013 – 28 June 2015
- Prime Minister: Helle Thorning-Schmidt
- Preceded by: Annette Vilhelmsen
- Succeeded by: Troels Lund Poulsen

Member of the Folketing
- In office 1 October 2000 – 30 September 2019
- Constituency: Zealand (2007—2019); Roskilde (2001—2007); Copenhagen (2000—2001)

Personal details
- Born: 29 May 1966 (age 60) Virum, Denmark
- Party: Social Democrats (until 2025)

Henrik Sass Larsen (born 29 May 1966) is a Danish former politician and business executive. He was a member of the Folketing for the Social Democrats from 2000 to 2019. He was the Danish Minister of Business Affairs and Growth from 2013 to 2015. In 2025, he was convicted of possession of child sexual abuse material.

== Political career ==
Larsen led the Social Democratic Youth of Denmark from 1992 to 1996. He acted as a substitute member of the Folketing twice during the 1998—2001 term, from 19 January 1999 to 21 March 1999 and again from 16 June 1999 to 22 June 1999. On 1 October 2000 Helle Degn resigned her seat and Larsen took over the seat. He was elected directly into parliament in the 2001 election and was reelected in the 2005, 2007 and 2011 elections. He was the group leader of the Social Democrats in parliament from 2012 to 2013. In 2013 he was appointed Minister of Business Affairs and Growth. He held this position until the 2015 election, where the Social Democrats lost the election to Venstre and so Larsen lost the minister title. He was reelected, and again became the group leader of the Social Democrats. He was elected again in the 2019 election, but resigned his seat shortly after the election. Tanja Larsson took over the seat.

== Controversies ==
In March 2025, Sass Larsen was charged with having videos of child sexual abuse material on his computer, as well as having a childlike sex doll. His trial started on 21 August 2025. The trial ended on September 1, 2025, where he was found guilty of possessing abusive material but acquitted of possessing a child sex doll. He was sentenced to four months in prison. He was expelled from the Social Democrats in June 2025.

== Bibliography ==
- Exodus – vejen frem for centrum-venstre (2018)
- Tilbage til Friheden (1996, co-author)
- En europæisk utopi (1994, co-author)

Political offices
Preceded by Annette Vilhelmsen	Minister of Business Affairs and Growth; 2013–2015	Succeeded by Troels Lund Poulsen
