= North Atlantic mandates =

Members of the Folketing who represent the Faroe Islands and Greenland

The North Atlantic mandates (Danish: nordatlantiske mandater) or Faroese and Greenlandic members of the Folketing, are the members of the Folketing who represent the Faroe Islands and Greenland in the North Atlantic ocean, which were introduced in connection with the amendment to the Danish Constitution in 1953. Both are members of The Unity of the Realm, and therefore send two mandates each (four in total), while Denmark proper, due to its comparatively much larger population, sends 175 mandates to the Folketing.

As self-governing parts of the Kingdom of Denmark, the Faroe Islands and Greenland hold their own parliamentary elections and are not included in the calculation of the elections in Denmark proper – unlike, for example, Bornholm, which is guaranteed 2 of the 175 Danish mandates and whose votes are included in the determination of levelling seats.

== Calculation of blue and red mandates ==
The following statement should be seen in the light of various media opinion polls leading up to parliamentary elections, where the North Atlantic mandates are rarely included. As can be seen, the mandates have been equally distributed between the blocs in the elections in the period from 1977 to 1998. Both before and since there has been a red majority in the North Atlantic. Only in the 1994 election has there been a blue majority. It should be emphasized that it is the parties' overall positions that must be taken into account when supporting the formation of a government.

Year	Red Mandates	Blue Mandates	Parties
2022			
2019	3	1	Siumut Inuit Ataqatigiit The Social Democratic Party The Union Party
2015	4	0	Siumut/Nunatta Qitornai Sovereignty Inuit Ataqatigiit The Social Democratic Party
2011	3	1	Siumut The Union Party Inuit Ataqatigiit The Social Democratic Party
2007	3	1	Inuit Ataqatigiit Siumut Sovereignty The Union Party
2005	3	1	Sovereignty The People's Party Siumut Inuit Ataqatigiit
2001	3	1	Sovereignty The Union Party Siumut Inuit Ataqatigiit
1998	2	2	The People's Party Siumut The Social Democratic Party Atassut
1994	1	3	Siumut Atassut The People's Party The Union Party
1990	2	2	Faroese Social Democracy Siumut Atassut The People's Party
1988	2	2	The Union Party Siumut Atassut The People's Party
1987	2	2	Faroese Social Democracy Siumut Atassut The People's Party
1984	2	2	Siumut The Union Party Atassut The People's Party
1981	2	2	Faroese Social Democracy The Union Party Atassut Siumut
1979	2	2	Faroese Social Democracy The Union Party Atassut Siumut
1977	2	2	The Union Party Faroese Social Democracy UP (Siumut) UP (Atassut)
1975	4	0	Faroese Social Democracy Sovereignty UP (Siumut) Sukaq
1973	4	0	Faroese Social Democracy Sovereignty Sukaq UP (Siumut)
1971	3	1	The People's Party Faroese Social Democracy UP (Sukaq) UP (Siumut)
1968	3	1	The People's Party Faroese Social Democracy UP (Siumut) UP (Sukaq)
1966	3	1	The People's Party Faroese Social Democracy UP (Siumut) UP (Sukaq)
1964	3	1	The People's Party Faroese Social Democracy UP (Sukaq) UP (Siumut)
1960	3	1	The Union Party Faroese Social Democracy UP UP (Siumut)
1957	2		The Union Party The People's Party UP UP
1953	1	1	The Union Party Faroese Social Democracy UP UP

Source: Information from the Danish Parliament, folketinget.dk

Parties in parentheses indicate the member as a later founder, co-founder or member of the party. At present, it has not been possible to unequivocally determine the political affiliation of most Greenlandic members in the first 3 elections.

== North Atlantic mandates since 1979 ==
Elected North Atlantic members in all elections since 23 October 1979:

The election of 23 October 1979 & the election of 8 December 1981:

Jacob Lindenskov, (S, Færøerne)

Pauli Ellefsen (Sambandspartiet, Færøerne)

Otto Steenholdt (Atassut, Greenland)

Preben Lange (Siumut, Greenland)

The election of 10 January 1984:

Preben Lange (Siumut, Grønland)

Pauli Ellefsen (Sambandspartiet, Færøerne)

Otto Steenholdt (Atassut, Grønland)

Óli Breckmann (Folkeflokken, Færøerne)

The election of 8 September 1987:

Atli Dam (S, Færøerne)

Hans-Pavia Rosing (Siumut, Grønland)

Otto Steenholdt (Atassut, Grønland)

Óli Breckmann (Folkeflokken, Færøerne)

The election of 10 May 1988:

Pauli Ellefsen (Sambandspartiet, Færøerne)

Hans-Pavia Rosing (Siumut, Grønland)

Otto Steenholdt (Atassut, Grønland)

Óli Breckmann (Folkeflokken, Færøerne)

The election of 12 December 1990:

Atli Dam (S, Færøerne)

Hans-Pavia Rosing (Siumut, Grønland)

Otto Steenholdt (Atassut, Grønland)

Óli Breckmann (Folkeflokken, Færøerne)

The election of 21 September 1994:

Hans-Pavia Rosing (Siumut, Grønland)

Otto Steenholdt (Atassut, Grønland)

Óli Breckmann (Folkeflokken, Færøerne)

Edmund Joensen (Sambandspartiet, Færøerne)

The election of 11 March 1998:

Óli Breckmann (Folkeflokken, Færøerne)

Hans-Pavia Rosing (Siumut, Grønland)

Jóhannes Eidesgaard (Det Færøske Socialdemokrati –Javnadarflokkurin)

Ellen Kristensen (Atassut, grønland)

The election of 21 November 2001:

Høgni Hoydal (Tjódveldisflokkurin – Republikanerne, Færøerne)

Lisbeth L. Petersen (Sambandspartiet, Færøerne)

Lars-Emil Johansen (Siumut, Grønland)

Kuupik Kleist (Inuit Ataqatigiit, Grønland)

The election of 8 February 2005:

Høgni Hoydal (Tjódveldisflokkurin – Republikanerne, Færøerne)

Anfinn Kallsberg (Fólkaflokkurin, Færøerne)

Lars-Emil Johansen (Siumut, Grønland)

Kuupik Kleist (Inuit Ataqatigiit, Grønland)

The election of 13 November 2007

Juliane Henningsen (Inuit Ataqatigiit)

Lars Emil Johansen (Siumut)

Høgni Hoydal (Tjódveldisflokkurin)

Edmund Joensen (Sambandsflokkurin)

The election of 15 September 2011

Doris Jakobsen (Siumut, Grønland)

Edmund Joensen (Sambandsflokkurin, Færøerne)

Sara Olsvig (Inuit Ataqatigiit, Grønland)

Sjurður Skaale (Javnaðarflokkurin, Færøerne)

The election of 18 June 2015

Aleqa Hammond (18/62015 - 23/8 2016 Siumut's parliamentary group. 23/8 2016 - 25/4 2018 independent and with the 25/4 2018 the Greenlandic party Nunatta Qitornai)

Høgni Hoydal (Tjóðveldi, Færøerne)

Aaja Chemnitz Larsen (Inuit Ataqatigiit, Grønland)

Sjurður Skaale (Javnaðarflokkurin, Færøerne)

The election 5 June 2019

Aki-Matilda Høegh-Dam (Siumut, Grønland)

Aaja Chemnitz Larsen (Inuit Ataqatigiit, Grønland)

Sjurður Skaale (Javnaðarflokkurin, Færøerne)

Edmund Joensen (Sambandsflokkurin, Færøerne)

== See also ==
- Member of the Folketing
