= Louise Frevert =

Danish politician

- Born: 31 May 1953 (age 73); Frederiksberg, Denmark

Louise Frevert (born 31 May 1953) is a former member of the Danish parliament, born in Frederiksberg. She was elected as member of parliament for the Danish People's Party in the 2001 election and reelected in 2005. She left the party in 2007 and later joined the Centre Democrats, which did not stand for reelection in the 2007 elections. She is also a former member of the Conservative People's Party.

Before entering politics, she was a professional belly dancer and performed in the 1970s for the Iranian Shah Mohammad Reza Pahlavi. She also performed as a backup dancer with Debbie Cameron at Eurovision 1981. She has also been a pornographic actress and has performed in several short vignettes from Color Climax. Louise Frevert is openly lesbian. She has 4 children from past marriages to men. On 19 January 2013, she married her partner Suzanne.

Frevert was prosecuted for her 2005 comments against immigration and Muslims, which she published on her website. She later claimed the articles in question had been posted on the website by a party colleague without her knowledge.
