= Oyri =

- Village
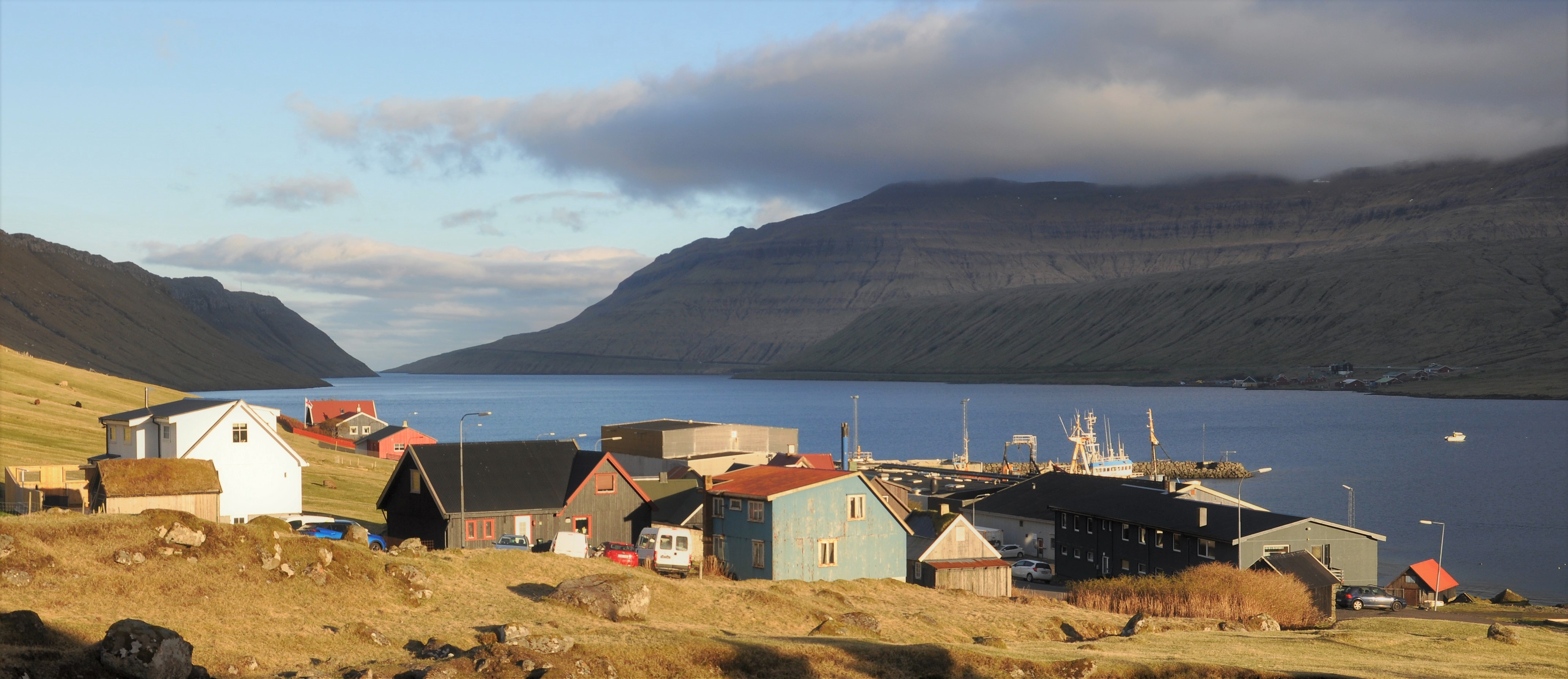
- Oyri

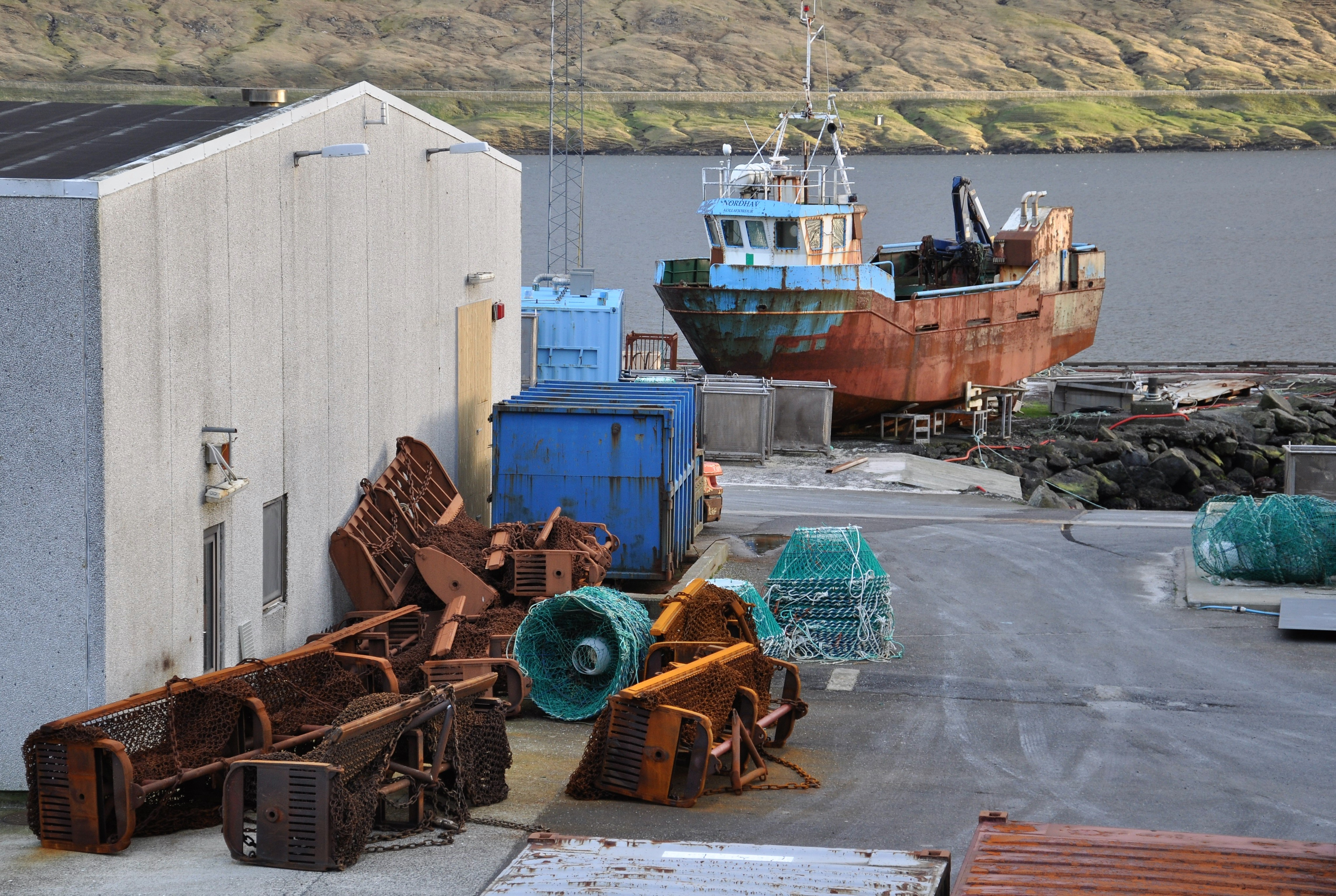
- Harbor scene

- Location in the Faroe Islands
- Coordinates: 62°11′26″N 6°58′24″W
- State: Kingdom of Denmark
- Constituent country: Faroe Islands
- Island: Eysturoy
- Municipality: Sunda

Population (September 2025)
  - Total: 181
- Time zone: GMT
  - Summer (DST): UTC+1 (EST)
- Postal code: 450
- Climate: Cfc

Oyri is a village on the central west coast of the Faroese island Eysturoy in the Sunda municipality.

The 2005 population was 142. Its postal code is FO 450. The village is south of the Eysturoy-to-Streymoy bridge, and is home to a large fish processing plant.

The name Oyri is usually translated as a sandspit.

== See also ==
- List of towns in the Faroe Islands
