= Frank Aaen =

Danish politician and economist

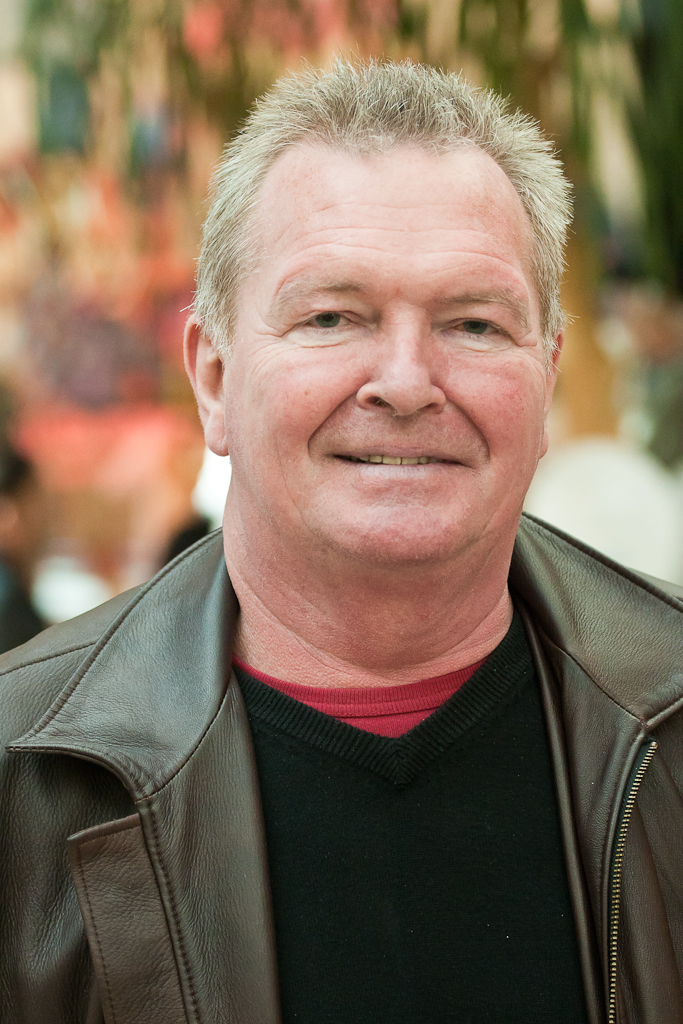
- Aaen in 2011
- Born: 25 July 1951 (age 74); Nørresundby, Denmark
- Occupations: Economist, politician

Frank Aaen (born 25 July 1951) is a Danish economist and Member of Parliament (the Folketing) for Enhedslisten. On 15 March 2006, he suffered a thrombosis but was back in the Folketing by April.

Frank Aaen is an educated economist and holds a master's degree in economics from Aalborg University which he received in 1985.

== Career ==
Aine also serves as chairman and founder of the Cash Shareholders Association since 1998, giving him the opportunity to speak at the general meetings of numerous shareholder companies.In 2005, he was re-elected to Parliament (the Folketing), where he served as the Red Unity Party's rapporteur for finance, tax, and business policy.Among other things, politically he is known for raising many critical questions about economic issues, particularly those related to large multinational corporations.He also repeatedly criticized the wealthy for trying to evade taxes, and corporations for evading corporate tax.

== Politics ==
Aaen has been a member of parliament from 1994 to 2003 and 2005 to 2015. He is a member of the left-wing political party Red-Green Alliance. In 2006, he called for the detention of Israeli Foreign Minister Tzipi Livni during her trip to Denmark for the purpose of determining her culpability as a member of the Israeli cabinet for alleged Israeli war crimes. In January 2019, he was accused by Kristian Jensen of spreading false information regarding the sale of energy company Radius. Aaen maintained that the company was being sold at a cheap price. The Danish Ministry of Finance has canceled the sale citing a lack of political support.
