= Rune Lund =

Danish politician (born 1976)

Member of the Folketing
- In office 18 June 2015 – 2022
- Constituency: Copenhagen
- In office 8 February 2005 – 13 November 2007
- Constituency: Fyn

Personal details
- Born: 30 October 1976 (age 49) Copenhagen, Denmark
- Party: Red–Green Alliance

Rune Lund (born 30 October 1976) is a former Danish politician, who was a member of the Folketing for the Red–Green Alliance political party. He was elected at the 2015 Danish general election, and previously sat in parliament from 2005 to 2007.

== Political career ==
Lund was first elected into parliament at the 2005 election. He was not reelected in 2007, but received enough votes to become the Red-Green Alliance's primary substitute in the Fyn constituency. In the 2015 election he received 530, but the Red-Green Alliance received enough overall votes for several levelling seats, one of which went to Lund. He was reelected in 2019 Danish general election with 1,157 votes, which was enough for a direct seat in parliament. He stepped down from the Folketing in 2022 and moved to Kenya. He now works as the East Africa manager for Danish software company cBrain.
