= LGBTQ rights in the Faroe Islands =

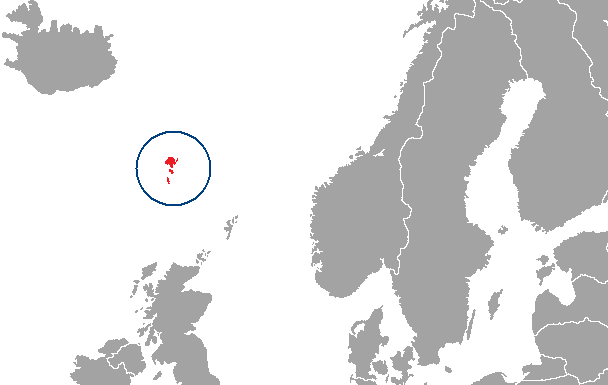
- Faroe Islands
- Legal status: Decriminalized since 1933, age of consent equalized in 1988
- Military: LGBT have been allowed to serve openly in the army since 1978
- Discrimination protections: Yes, but for hate crime and hate speech only

Family rights
- Recognition of relationships: Same-sex marriage since 2017
- Adoption: Full adoption rights since 2017

Lesbian, gay, bisexual, transgender and queer (LGBTQ) rights in the Faroe Islands are relatively similar to those of Denmark. The progress of LGBTQ rights has been slower in this territory, however. While same-sex sexual activity has been legal in the Faroe Islands since the 1930s, historically same-sex couples never had a right to a registered partnership. In April 2016, the Løgting (Faroese Parliament) passed legislation legalizing civil same-sex marriage in the Faroes, recognizing same-sex marriages established in Denmark and abroad and allowing same-sex adoption. This was ratified by the Folketing (Danish Parliament) in April 2017. The law came into effect on 1 July 2017.

== Law regarding same-sex sexual activity ==
Same-sex sexual activity has been legal in the Faroe Islands since 1933, when it was legalized in all parts of the Kingdom of Denmark. At that time, the age of consent was set at 18 for male same-sex relations. While Denmark (including the County of Greenland) lowered the age of consent to 15 in 1977, making it gender-neutral, the autonomous Faroe Islands did not follow suit and change its law until 1988.

== Recognition of same-sex relationships ==
Denmark legalised same-sex marriage in 2012 and Greenland's identical marriage law took into effect on 1 April 2016, but a similar attempt had been rejected in the Faroe Islands, until a law was finally passed in late April 2016.

An attempt to introduce Denmark's registered partnerships law in the Faroe Islands was considered in 2007, but it was never submitted to the Faroese Parliament; whilst a same-sex marriage bill was rejected by the Parliament in 2014, prior to the 2015 election. Following that election, a same-sex marriage bill was put to the Parliament in September 2015. The proposed bill included civil marriage and full adoption rights for same-sex couples in line with the laws of Denmark and Greenland.

It had its first reading on 24 November 2015 and a second reading was initiated on 16 March 2016, though it was sent back to committee. A petition against same-sex marriage received 1,262 signatures.

The bill was tabled again on 26 April 2016. The Parliament voted for it in its second reading, 19 votes for and 14 against. The third reading of the bill was held on 29 April 2016 and the bill passed again with 19 votes for and 14 against. The bill received formal ratification in the Danish Parliament in April 2017 and received royal assent the following month. The law went into effect on 1 July 2017. The first same-sex wedding in the Faroe Islands was performed on 6 September 2017.

== Adoption and parenting ==
The same-sex marriage legislation passed by the Løgting on 29 April 2016 and ratified by the Danish Parliament on 25 April 2017, contains provisions allowing adoption of children by married same-sex couples. The law went into effect on 1 July 2017. Only married couples can legally adopt children, not single people or unmarried couples.

Despite the recent changes in the marriage law in April 2016, the issues of paternal leave and co-parenting (among other matters) for same-sex couples were left unresolved at the time. On 20 December 2021, two bills submitted by the opposition parties to address the parental rights of same-sex couples were passed in the Løgting at 3rd reading.

20 December 2021 vote in the Parliament of the Faroe Islands
Party	Voted For	Voted Against	Abstained (Voted "Blank")	Absent (Did not vote)
G People's Party (8)	1: Annika Olsen (substitute)	7: Beinir Johannesen; Christian Andreasen; Elsebeth Mercedis Gunnleygsdóttur; Jacob Vestergaard; Jákup Mikkelsen; Jógvan á Lakjuni; Uni Rasmussen	–	–
Social Democratic Party (7)	7: Aksel Vilhelmson Johannesen; Bjarni Hammer; Djóni Nolsøe Joensen; Eyðgunn Samuelsen (substitute); Henrik Old; Jóhannis Joensen; Kristianna Winther Poulsen (substitute)	–	–	–
G Union Party (7)	2: Erhard Joensen^{a} (substitute); Johan Dahl	4: Edva Jacobsen (substitute); Frimodt Rasmussen; Helgi Abrahamsen; Jaspur Langgaard (substitute)	1: Rósa Samuelsen	–
Republic (6)	6: Beinta Løwe Jacobsen; Bjørt Samuelsen; Hervør Pálsdóttir; Høgni Hoydal; Páll á Reynatúgvu (substitute); Sirið Stenberg	–	–	–
G Centre Party (2)	–	2: Bill Justinussen; Steffan Klein Poulsen (substitute)	–	–
Progress (2)	2: Bjarni K. Petersen; Ruth Vang^{b}	–	–	–
Self-Government Party (1)	–	–	–	1: Kristin Michelsen
Total	18	13	1	1

a. Union Party MP Erhard Joensen was absent during the first vote.
b. Progress MP Ruth Vang replaced founder and leader of the party Poul Michelsen, who left the Logting in March 2020 due to health reasons. The former was listed as #3 on the list, so she was not elected as a sitting MP in the 2019 general election.

As a result of the passed legislations, changes to the law on parental custody went into effect on 1 January 2022. Following the 8 December 2022 general election & the formation of a new government cabinet, the issue of a child's surname raised by two women have been resolved by the Minister of Justice and Internal Affairs, Bjarni K. Petersen (Progress) on the first day of his new position on 23 December 2022.

== Discrimination protections ==
Denmark's prohibition of discrimination on the basis of sexual orientation came into force in 1987. The Faroese Parliament proposed a similar bill in 1988, but the bill was rejected with only one member voting for and 17 voting against. The bill was not proposed again until November 2005, when it was again rejected by a vote of 20 to 12. The members who voted against it claimed that since "homosexuality goes against the Bible", discrimination against a person on that basis should be lawful. Numerous insulting remarks were also made by Faroese MPs, including the equating of LGBT people with sinners and pedophiles. The vote attracted the criticism of an Icelandic MP.

Despite the legislative attempts, the issue did not become a source of public debate until 2006, when openly gay musician and popular radio host Rasmus Rasmussen was assaulted by five men in Tórshavn. Rasmussen's family members then began receiving threatening phone calls. However, the police refused to handle the case because there was no Faroese law banning discrimination against sexual minorities at the time. An internet petition collected 20,000 signatures from different parts of world, most of them coming mainly from Denmark, Iceland and the Faroe Islands themselves, urging the Faroese Parliament to legislate against discrimination based on sexual orientation. At the same time, eight women from Tórshavn also collected 2,000 signatures via e-mail through collecting signatures around Faroese shops, tourist centers and gas stations.

At the time, a poll conducted by Faroese newspaper Sosialurin showed that the Faroese public was divided on the issue.

On 15 December 2006, in a 17–15 vote, Faroese legislators approved the inclusion of the words "sexual orientation" in the Faroese anti-discrimination law, stating that "whoever publicly or with the intention of dissemination to a wider circle makes a statement or other communication by which a group of persons are threatened, insulted or degraded on account of their race, color, national or ethnic origin, religion or sexual orientation is liable to pay a fine or be imprisoned for up to two years." When the law took effect on 1 January 2007, the Faroe Islands became the last Northern European country to ban discrimination and harassment based on sexual orientation.

15 December 2006 vote in the Parliament of the Faroe Islands
Party	Voted for	Voted against
G Union Party (7)	5: Edmund Joensen; Johan Dahl; Kaj Leo Johannesen; Lisbeth L. Petersen; Olav Enomoto (substitute)	2: Alfred Olsen; Marjus Dam
G Social Democratic Party (7)	4: Andrea Petersen; John Johannessen; Kristian Magnussen; Vilhelm Johannesen	3: Gerhard Lognberg; Henrik Old (substitute); Sverre Midjord
Republic (8)	7: Annita á Fríðriksmørk; Finnur Helmsdal; Heidi Petersen; Hergeir Nielsen; Høgni Hoydal; Páll á Reynatúgvu; Tórbjørn Jacobsen	1: Karsten Hansen
G People's Party (7)	1: Poul Michelsen	6: Anfinn Kallsberg; Heðin Zachariasen; Jógvan við Keldu; Jørgen Niclasen; Kjartan Joensen (substitute); Óli Breckmann (substitute)
Centre Party (2)	–	2: Jenis av Rana; Bill Justinussen
Self-Government Party (1)	–	1: Kári P. Højgaard
Total	17	15

== Living conditions ==
Prior to 2012, LGBT rights was not a high-profile issue in the Faroe Islands.

The Faroe Islands had been viewed by neighboring countries and worldwide media as a homophobic country for a long time. Generally, this was because religious observance is stronger and more widespread in the Faroe Islands than any other Nordic country, and due to the lack of LGBT rights, such as recognition of same-sex unions, particularly when compared with other Nordic countries. Both factors created a perception that Faroese people were intolerant of LGBT individuals. In the past, the demonization of LGBT people as "monsters" or "freaks" by Faroese churches or religious leaders was quite common, and until recently there was limited knowledge or discussion of LGBT people and their rights, leading many Faroese LGBT people to remain in the closet for decades out of fear of discrimination. There were also cases of Faroese LGBT people being rejected by family or friends and of LGBT people being forced to take refuge in other Nordic countries to escape discrimination or to have their rights recognized. Some living overseas even refused to return to the Faroe Islands. On top of that, there were also a number of high-profile homophobic incidents widely reported in the Scandinavian press.

=== High-profile homophobic incidents ===
- The first gay pride march in the islands in 2005 provoked much controversy and criticism.
- In 2005, the members of Great Garlic Girls, a group of Norwegian males who perform in drag, had to run for their lives when a gang of young men, intent on physically assaulting them, chased them down a street in Tórshavn during their performance. Nowhere else had the group been physically attacked.
- In 2006, Rasmus Rasmussen (fo), a popular and respected Faroese singer, songwriter, guitarist and radio host, was severely beaten by five men in Tórshavn and hospitalised, shortly after he publicly came out. He was later moved to a psychiatric hospital, suffering from severe depression, exacerbated by the beating. Following media reports of the attack, he and his family received threatening telephone calls. The Danish Prime Minister and Nordic Council expressed their concerns on the issue. Meanwhile, in an interview with Danish media in December 2006, Rasmussen said that he grew tired of condescending glances and mocking comments from Faroese society. Rasmussen never recovered from the attack and became mentally ill. He died by suicide in 2012.
- In 2010, Christian Centre Party MP Jenis av Rana declined a dinner invitation with Icelandic Prime Minister Jóhanna Sigurðardóttir, a married lesbian, explaining that he did so "because of the party's views against same-sex marriage." He provoked further controversy by claiming that the majority of Faroese people would agree with his statement. This incident was widely reported in the Scandinavian press and earned him much criticism, particularly from the Faroese, because of the potentially damaging nature of his actions to diplomatic relations between Iceland and the Faroe Islands. Some also criticized Jenis av Rana for damaging the reputation of the Faroe Islands.
- In June 2015, Løgting Speaker Jógvan á Lakjuni wrote a letter to the editor titled "Hvar eru vit á veg?" ("Where are we heading?"). Jógvan á Lakjuni wrote that "we can see how selective [national broadcasting company] Kringvarp Føroya is – i.e., how much space the LGBT and its president get – while others, who try to speak against them, are ridiculed and ignored! And then there is the Nordic House in Tórshavn, which now just before the Ólavsøka, our Christian national holiday, will have a so-called 'dragshow', where the homo-organization also plays a major role. What is this? Do these people not feel any shame at all, dragging such non-culture into the Nordic House?"

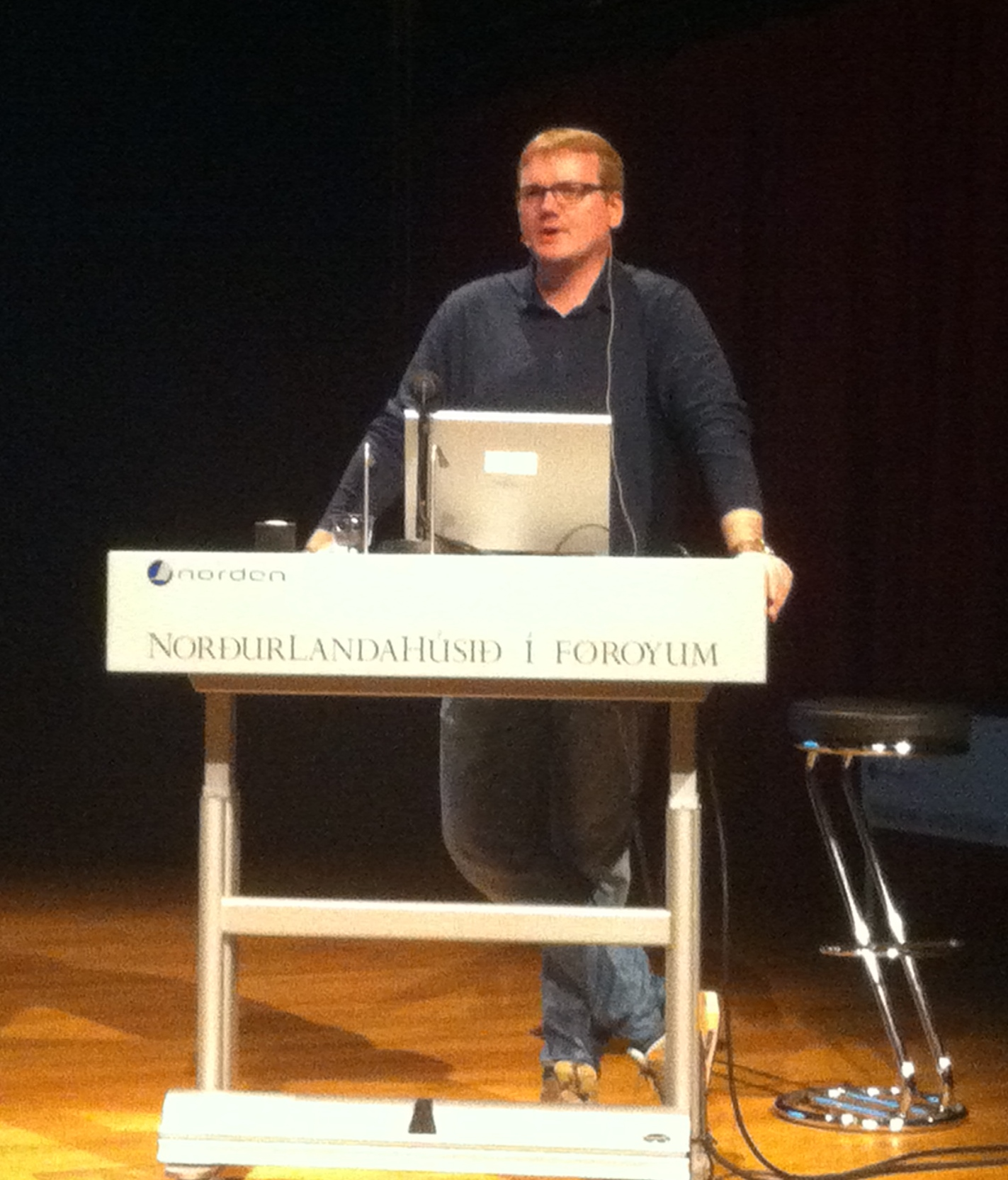
Prominent member of LGBT Føroyar, Eiler Fagraklett in 2015

- In August 2015, one of the themes that garnered a relatively high amount of attention in that year's general election campaign was same-sex marriage. The Centre Party quoted Bible on several occasions. On 29 August 2015, there was an open air prayer meeting in front of the Parliament for people to pray for the election and for marriage between one man and one woman, because organizers felt the Christian foundation of Faroese society was being threatened. Four members of different Christian congregations sent out an appeal to the public to gather on the Tinghúsvøllur in front of Parliament and pray. Centre Party Leader Jenis av Rana compared the LGBT Føroyar organization with the Sea Shepherd Conservation Society, which ran a campaign against pilot whale hunting in the Faroe Islands in 2014 and 2015. Jenis av Rana claimed that both LGBT Føroyar and Sea Shepherd were threats from abroad against Faroese society, but that he considered LGBT Føroyar to be a worse threat, because the Sea Shepherd Society was only present for the summer while LGBT Føroyar was in the Faroe Islands all year long and "represented a far bigger threat to Christian values". Jenis av Rana repeated much the same thing in July 2015, suggesting that the pride parade held in the center of Tórshavn just before the Ólavsøka national holiday should be moved to Hoyvík, outside of Tórshavn, just as had been done with whaling protesters in 2014. Eiler Fagraklett, a spokesperson for LGBT Føroyar, responded on Facebook that he was deeply hurt by the discussion about Faroese marriage law and especially by the description by many Faroese during the electoral campaign of gay people as big sinners. Fagraklett also pointed out that the Prime Minister, the Speaker of the Løgting, three priests and 800 others had participated in the prayer meeting in front of Parliament to pray for the election and against same-sex marriage.

=== Recent developments ===
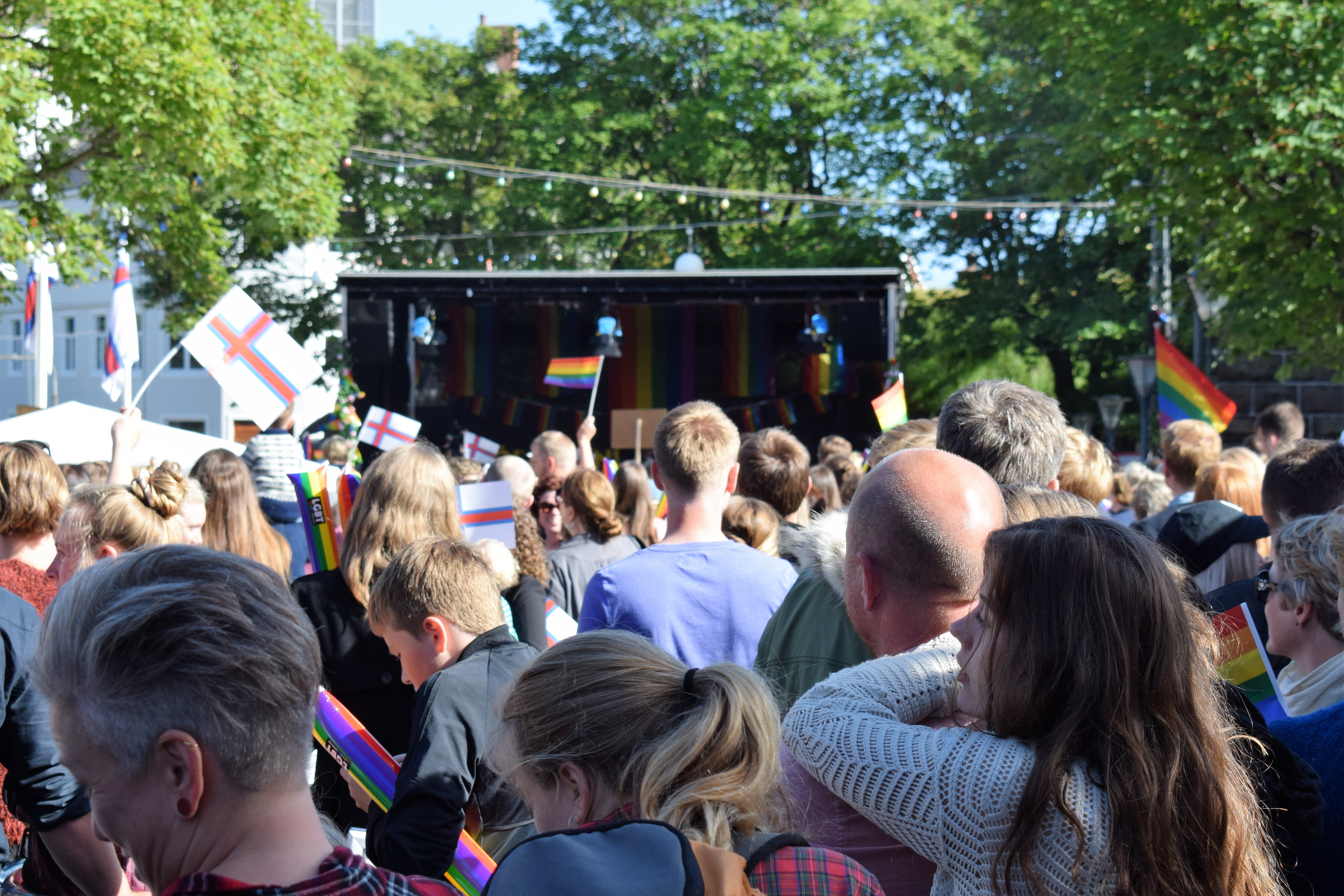
Participants at the 2017 Faroe Pride parade

Later developments suggested that the Faroe Islands were becoming more liberal, even though the laws were still relatively conservative compared to other Nordic countries. This was partly due to the outlawing of discrimination towards LGBT people, which in turn encouraged many to come out publicly and over time the previous negative attitudes towards LGBT individuals have softened. Various LGBT exhibitions on the islands such as "Hvat er natúrligt?", and "Gay Greenland" also helped increase public support for the LGBT community.

In addition, the Faroese LGBT population received support from well-known Faroese figures such as singer-songwriter Eivør Pálsdóttir, who defended gay people in an interview with Icelandic media, saying that those with narrow-minded opinions on gays and transgender people should be ignored.

Despite recent liberalization of attitudes towards LGBT people, limitations on their living conditions remain. Many MPs and government officials still hold homophobic attitudes or use religious reasoning to criticize LGBT people and block moves towards increased LGBT rights. The country scored very low in both the ranking of "Rainbow Map Europe 2013" and "Rainbow Map Europe 2015".

Sonja Jógvansdóttir became the first openly gay person to be elected to the Faroese Parliament after the September 2015 general election. She received 1,020 votes, making her the third-most popular Faroese politician. She was a prominent figure in the fight for the legalization of same-sex marriage.

In recent years, Faroe Pride (fo), held annually in Tórshavn on 27 July, has attracted around 10% of the entire Faroese population. Past guests and speakers have included former mayor of Tórshavn Heðin Mortensen, former mayor of Reykjavík Jón Gnarr, former American ambassador to Denmark Rufus Gifford, local priest Marjun Bæk and former Icelandic Prime Minister Jóhanna Sigurðardóttir.

== Summary table ==
Right	Yes/No	Notes
Same-sex sexual activity legal	Yes	Since 1933
Equal age of consent (15)	Yes	Since 1988
Anti-discrimination laws in employment	No	
Anti-discrimination laws in the provision of goods and services	No	
Anti-discrimination laws in all other areas (incl. indirect discrimination, hate speech)	Yes	Since 2007
Anti-discrimination laws concerning gender identity	No	
Hate crime laws include sexual orientation	Yes	Since 2007
Same-sex marriage(s)	Yes	Since 2017
Recognition of same-sex couples	Yes	Since 2017
Stepchild adoption by same-sex couples	Yes	Since 2017
Joint adoption by same-sex couples	Yes	Since 2017
LGBT people allowed to serve in the military	Yes	Since 1978; the Kingdom of Denmark responsible for defence
Right to change legal gender	Yes	Since 1967; another act from 2018 pending
Access to IVF for lesbians	No	
Commercial surrogacy for gay male couples	No	Banned for heterosexual couples as well
MSMs allowed to donate blood	Yes / No	(Since 2020, 6-month deferral period)

== See also ==
- LGBT rights in Denmark
- LGBT rights in Greenland
- LGBT rights in Europe
