= List of members of the Løgting, 2011–2015 =

List of the members of the Faroese Løgting in the period 2011–2015. The parliament had 33 members this period. The election for the Løgting was held on 29 October 2011. Seven political parties got representation in the parliament; People's Party and Union Party got 8 members each, Social Democratic Party and Republic got 6 members each, Centre Party and Progress got 2 members each and Self-Government Party got 1 member elected to the parliament. The Faroe Islands was one electoral district when this election took place. This was the second election with the new system with one electoral district. Before 2008 there were 7 electoral districts.

The government during this legislature was the Cabinet of Kaj Leo Johannesen II; a coalition of the Union Party, People's Party, Self-Government Party and Centre Party.

Name	Party	From area	Comments
Aksel V. Johannesen	Social Democratic Party	Norðoyar	
Alfred Olsen	Union Party	Eysturoy	
Annika Olsen	People's Party	Suðurstreymoy	Minister and Deputy Prime Minister since 2011. Rodmundur Nielsen took his seat in the Parliament.
Bill Justinussen	Centre Party	Eysturoy	
Bjarni Djurholm	People's Party	Suðurstreymoy	
Bjørn Kalsø	Union Party	Norðoyar	Minister of Culture since 2010. Reimund Langgaard took his seat in the Parliament.
Bjørt Samuelsen	Republic	Suðurstreymoy	
Bárður á Steig Nielsen	Union Party	Norðurstreymoy	
Edva Jacobsen	Union Party	Eysturoy	
Elsebeth Mercedis Gunnleygsdóttur	People's Party	Norðoyar	
Eyðgun Samuelsen	Social Democratic Party	Norðoyar	
Gerhard Lognberg	Social Democratic Party/Union Party	Sandoy	He represented the Social Democratic Party 2011–2013, he was expelled from the party on 2 November 2013 and was independent until 10 February 2014, when he became member of the Union Party.
Gunvør Balle	Republic	Suðurstreymoy	
Hanus Samró	People's Party	Suðurstreymoy	
Helgi Abrahamsen	Union Party	Eysturoy	
Henrik Old	Social Democratic Party	Suðuroy	
Høgni Hoydal	Republic	Suðurstreymoy	
Jacob Vestergaard	People's Party	Suðuroy	Minister of Fisheries 2012–
Jákup Mikkelsen	People's Party	Norðoyar	Minister of Fisheries 2011–2012. Joen Magnus Rasmussen took his seat in the Parliament.
Janus Rein	Framsókn	Suðurstreymoy	
Jenis av Rana	Centre Party	Suðurstreymoy	
Jógvan á Lakjuni	People's Party	Eysturoy	Speaker of the Løgting (Parliament)
Johan Dahl	Union Party	Suðuroy	Minister since 2011. Jóna Mortensen took his seat in the Parliament.
Jørgen Niclasen	People's Party	Vágar	Minister of Finance since 2011. Brandur Sandoy took his seat in the Parliament.
Kaj Leo Holm Johannesen	Union Party	Suðurstreymoy	Prime Minister since 2011. Eivin Jacobsen took his seat in the Parliament.
Kristin Michelsen	Social Democratic Party	Suðuroy	
Kristina Háfoss	Republic	Suðurstreymoy	
Kári P. Højgaard	Self-Government Party	Eysturoy	Minister from 2011 to 2013. Jógvan Skorheim took his seat in the Parliament during this time.
Poul Michelsen	Framsókn	Suðurstreymoy	
Páll á Reynatúgvu	Republic	Sandoy	
Rigmor Dam	Social Democratic Party	Suðurstreymoy	
Rósa Samuelsen	Union Party	Vágar	
Sirið Stenberg	Republic	Suðuroy	

== Personal votes ==
Name	National party	# of votes
Helgi Abrahamsen	Union Party	404
Gunvør Balle	Republic	358
Johan Dahl	Union Party	327
Rigmor Dam	Social Democratic Party	271
Bjarni Djurholm	People's Party	328
Elsebeth Gunnleygsdóttur	People's Party	344
Kristina Háfoss	Republic	451
Høgni Hoydal	Republic	1054
Kári Højgaard	Self-Government Party	317
Edva Jacobsen	Union Party	311
Aksel V. Johannesen	Social Democratic Party	1204
Kaj Leo Johannesen	Union Party	1979
Bill Justinussen	Centre Party	428
Bjørn Kalsø	Union Party	704
Jógvan á Lakjuni	People's Party	341
Gerhard Lognberg	Social Democratic Party	344
Kristin Michelsen	Social Democratic Party	393
Poul Michelsen	Progress	581
Jákup Mikkelsen	People's Party	455
Jørgen Niclasen	People's Party	382
Bárður á Steig Nielsen	Union Party	872
Henrik Old	Social Democratic Party	265
Alfred Olsen	Union Party	473
Annika Olsen	People's Party	1344
Jenis av Rana	Centre Party	434
Janus Rein	Progress	250
Páll á Reynatúgvu	Republic	332
Hanus Samró	People's Party	304
Bjørt Samuelsen	Republic	365
Eyðgunn Samuelsen	Social Democratic Party	261
Rósa Samuelsen	Union Party	480
Sirið Stenberg	Republic	319
Jacob Vestergaard	People's Party	1048
