= Cabinet of Kaj Leo Johannesen II =

The Second Cabinet of Kaj Leo Johannesen was the government of the Faroe Islands from 14 November 2011 until 15 September 2015 with Kaj Leo Johannesen from Union Party (Sambandsflokkurin) as Prime Minister, making a coalition between Union Party (Sambandsflokkurin), People's Party (Fólkaflokkurin), Self-Government Party (Sjálvstýrisflokkurin) and Centre Party (Miðflokkurin). It is a majority government and the first completely right winged government on the islands since 1985. In September 2013 the Self Governing Party left the coalition and the ministry was closed, after their minister Kári P. Højgaard had been sacked after much discussion about a subsea tunnel between the two largest islands: Streymoy and Eysturoy, Eysturoyartunnilin, which Mr. Højgaard planned to let a private Danish company called Copenhagen Infrastructure Partners make. The plans about making the tunnel were aborted, but in February 2014 all political parties of the Løgting including the independent excluded former member of the Social Democratic Party (Javnaðarflokkurin), Gerhard Lognberg, agreed on making two subsea tunnels: Eysturoyartunnilin and Sandoyartunnilin, both are planned to open in 2021 if everything works out as the politicians have planned, and they will be made by the Faroese government.

	Minister	Party	From	Until
Prime Minister	Kaj Leo Johannesen	SB	14 November 2011	
Deputy Prime Minister	Annika Olsen	FF	14 November 2011	
Ministry	Minister	Party	From	Until
Ministry of Finance	Jørgen Niclasen	FF	14. November 2011	
Ministry of Health	Karsten Hansen	MF	14. November 2011	
Ministry of Culture	Bjørn Kalsø	SB	14. November 2011	
Ministry of Internal Affairs	Kári P. Højgaard	SF	14 November 2011	5 September 2013
Ministry of Fisheries	Jacob Vestergaard	FF	16 February 2012	
	Jákup Mikkelsen	FF	14 November 2011	15 February 2012
Ministry of Trade and Industry	Johan Dahl	SB	14 November 2011	15 September 2015
Ministry of Social Affairs	Annika Olsen	FF	14 November 2011	

== See also ==
- Cabinet of the Faroe Islands
- List of members of the Løgting, 2011–15
