= List of members of the Løgting, 2008–2011 =

List of members of the Faroese Løgting in the period 2008 to 2011. The members were elected on 19 January 2008.

Name	Party	Area (Sýsla)	Remarks
Alfred Olsen	Union Party	Eysturoy	
Annika Olsen	People's Party	Suðurstreymoy	Minister 2008–2011. Óli Breckmann took her place in the Løgting.
Annita á Fríðriksmørk	Republic	Eysturoy	
Anfinn Kallsberg	People's Party	Norðoyar	
Bergtóra Høgnadóttir Joensen	Republic	Suðurstreymoy	
Bill Justinussen	Centre Party	Eysturoy	
Bjørn Kalsø	Union Party	Norðoyar	
Bjørt Samuelsen	Republic	Suðurstreymoy	Minister in 2008. Heidi Petersen took her place in the Løgting.
Edmund Joensen	Union Party	Eysturoy	
Gerhard Lognberg	Social Democratic Party	Sandoy	
Hans Pauli Strøm	Social Democratic Party	Norðurstreymoy	Minister 2008–2009. Mikkjal Sørensen took his place in the Løgting.
Heini O. Heinesen	Republic	Norðoyar	
Helena Dam á Neystabø	Social Democratic Party	Suðurstreymoy	Minister in 2008. Eyðgunn Samuelsen took her place in the Løgting.
Hergeir Nielsen	Republic	Suðuroy	Speaker of the Løgting from 2008.
Høgni Hoydal	Republic	Suðurstreymoy	Minister from 2008. Páll á Reynatúgvu took his place in the Løgting.
Jacob Vestergaard	People's Party	Suðuroy	Minister 2008–2011. Bjarni Djurholm took his place in the Løgting.
Jákup Mikkelsen	People's Party	Norðoyar	
Jenis av Rana	Centre Party	Suðuroy	
Jóannes Eidesgaard	Social Democratic Party	Suðuroy	Løgmaður in 2008. Minister 2008–2011. Andrias Petersen took his place in the Løgting.
Jógvan á Lakjuni	People's Party	Eysturoy	
Johan Dahl	Union Party	Suðuroy	Minister from 2008. Jaspur Vang took his place in the Løgting.
John Johannessen	Social Democratic Party	Suðurstreymoy	
Jørgen Niclasen	People's Party	Vágar	Minister from 2008-2011. Heðin Zachariasen took his place in the Løgting.
Kaj Leo Johannesen	Union Party	Suðurstreymoy	Løgmaður from 2008. Helgi Abrahamsen took his place in the Løgting.
Kári á Rógvi	Self-Government Party	Suðurstreymoy	
Kári P. Højgaard	Self-Government Party	Eysturoy	
Karsten Hansen	Centre Party	Norðoyar	Minister in 2008. Tordur Niclasen took his place in the Løgting.
Katrin Dahl Jakobsen	Social Democratic Party	Suðurstreymoy	
Magni Laksáfoss	Union Party	Suðurstreymoy	
Poul Michelsen	People's Party	Suðurstreymoy	Member of the Løgting for Fólkaflokkin until 2010. He then left the party and created a new party Progress in 2011.
Rósa Samuelsen	Union Party	Vágar	Minister from 2008. Marjus Dam took her place in the Løgting.
Sjúrður Skaale	Republic	Suðurstreymoy	
Tórbjørn Jacobsen	Republic	Eysturoy	Minister in 2008. Olga Biskopstø took his place in the Løgting.
