= List of members of the Løgting, 1994–1998 =

A list of members of the Løgting from 1994 to 1998. The Løgting had 32 members this period.

== Members of the Løgting ==
Name	Party	Area	Remarks
Álvur Zachariasen	Self-Government Party	Norðoyar	
Anfinn Kallsberg	People's Party	Norðoyar	Minister 1996–1998. Rúna Sivertsen took his seat.
Bjarni Djurholm	People's Party	Suðurstreymoy	
Bjørn á Heygum	Union Party	Suðurstreymoy	
Edmund Joensen	Union Party	Eysturoy	Prime Minister 1994–1998. Atli Hansen took his seat.
Finnbogi Arge	Union Party	Suðurstreymoy	and became member of People's Party in 1995.
Finnbogi Ísakson	Republican Party	Suðurstreymoy	
Heini O. Heinesen	Republican Party	Norðoyar	
Helena Dam á Neystabø	Self-Government Party	Suðurstreymoy	
Henrik Old	Social Democratic Party	Suðuroy	
Ingeborg Vinther	Workers' Union	Suðuroy	
Ivan Johannesen	Union Party	Vágar	Minister 1994–1998. Sune Jacobsen took his seat.
Jákup Joensen	Union Party	Suðuroy	
Jákup Olsen	Christian People's Party	Suðuroy	
Jenis av Rana	Centre Party	Suðurstreymoy	
Jóannes Eidesgaard	Social Democratic Party	Suðuroy	Minister 1994–1996.
Jógvan A. Johannessen	Social Democratic Party	Sandoy	
Jógvan Durhuus	Republican Party	Norðurstreymoy	
Jógvan I. Olsen	Union Party	Eysturoy	Speaker of the Løgting in 1994 and 1995–1998.
John Petersen	People's Party	Sandoy	Minister 1996–1998. Eyðun M. Viderø took his seat.
Jørgen Niclasen	People's Party	Vágar	
Kjartan Joensen	People's Party	Eysturoy	
Kristian Magnussen	Workers' Union	Suðurstreymoy	Minister 1996–1998.
Lasse Klein	Christian People's Party	Eysturoy	
Lisbeth L. Petersen	Union Party	Suðurstreymoy	
Maria Hansen	Union Party	Norðurstreymoy	
Marita Petersen	Social Democratic Party	Suðurstreymoy	Speaker of the Løgting 1994–1995.
Óli Breckmann	People's Party	Suðurstreymoy	
Óli Jacobsen	Workers' Union	Eysturoy	Minister 1994–1995 and in 1998. K.R. Johansen took his seat.
Signar á Brúnni	Republican Party	Eysturoy	
Tordur Niclasen	Centre Party	Eysturoy	
Vilhelm Johannesen	Social Democratic Party	Norðoyar	
