= List of members of the Løgting, 1998–2002 =

A list of members of the Løgting from 1998 to 2002. The Løgting had 32 members this period. Before 2008 there were 7 electoral districts: Streymoy island was divided in a southern and northern part, Suðurstreymoy is the part of Streymoy, where Tórshavn, the capital, is located, Norðstreymoy is the northern part of Streymoy, where Vestmanna is the largest village. Eysturoy (the second largest island), Norðoyar (the island group in the north-east part of the Faroes: Kalsoy, Kunoy, Borðoy, Viðoy, Svínoy and Fugloy), Sandoy (including Skúvoy and Stóra Dímun), Suðuroy (the southernmost island) and Vágar (including Mykines).

== Regular members ==
This list include all elected members of the Løgting. Under "Remarks" the vice members, which took seats in the Løgting instead of the ministers are listed.

| Name | Party | Area | Remarks |
|---|---|---|---|
| Signar á Brúnni | Republican Party | Eysturoy | Minister i 1998–2000. Tórbjørn Jacobsen took his seat |
| Sámal Petur í Grund | Self-Government Party | Eysturoy | Minister i 2001–2002. Kári P. Højgaard took his seat |
| Edmund Joensen | Union Party | Eysturoy | |
| Jógvan á Lakjuni | People's Party | Eysturoy | |
| Alfred Olsen | Union Party | Eysturoy | |
| Dan Reinert Petersen | Social Democratic Party | Eysturoy | |
| Vilhelm Johannesen | Social Democratic Party | Norðoyar | |
| Heini O. Heinesen | Republican Party | Norðoyar | |
| Anfinn Kallsberg | People's Party | Norðoyar | Statsminister 1998–2002. Rúna Sivertsen took his seat |
| Jógvan við Keldu | People's Party | Norðoyar | |
| Jógvan Durhuus | Republican Party | North Streymoy (Norðurstreymoy) | |
| Jákup Suni Joensen | People's Party | North Streymoy (Norðurstreymoy) | |
| Hans Pauli Strøm | Social Democratic Party | North Streymoy (Norðurstreymoy) | |
| John Petersen | People's Party | Sandoy | Minister 1999–2002. Eyðun M. Viderø took his seat |
| Páll á Reynatúgvu | Republican Party | Sandoy | |
| Jóannes Eidesgaard | Social Democratic Party | Suðuroy | |
| Flemming Mikkelsen | Union Party | Suðuroy | |
| Hergeir Nielsen | Republican Party | Suðuroy | |
| Henrik Old | Social Democratic Party | Suðuroy | |
| Óli Breckmann | People's Party | South Streymoy (Suðurstreymoy) | |
| Bjarni Djurholm | People's Party | South Streymoy (Suðurstreymoy) | Minister 2000–2002. Finnbogi Arge took his seat |
| Annita á Fríðriksmørk | Republican Party | South Streymoy (Suðurstreymoy) | |
| Høgni Hoydal | Republican Party | South Streymoy (Suðurstreymoy) | Minister 1998–2002. Finnur Helmsdal took his seat |
| Finnbogi Ísakson | Republican Party | South Streymoy (Suðurstreymoy) | Speaker of the Løgting 1998–2002 |
| Katrin Dahl Jakobsen | Social Democratic Party | South Streymoy (Suðurstreymoy) | |
| Kristian Magnussen | Social Democratic Party | South Streymoy (Suðurstreymoy) | |
| Heðin Mortensen | Union Party | South Streymoy (Suðurstreymoy) | |
| Helena Dam á Neystabø | Self-Government Party | South Streymoy (Suðurstreymoy) | Minister i 1998–2001. Jákup Sverri Kass took his seat |
| Lisbeth L. Petersen | Union Party | South Streymoy (Suðurstreymoy) | |
| Jenis av Rana | Centre Party | South Streymoy (Suðurstreymoy) | |
| Marjus Dam | Union Party | Vágar | |
| Jørgen Niclasen | People's Party | Vágar | Minister 1998–2002. Jóanis Nielsen took his seat |
