= Cabinet of Jóannes Eidesgaard I =

The first cabinet of Jóannes Eidesgaard was the government of the Faroe Islands from 3 February 2004 until 4 February 2008. It was a coalition between People's Party (Fólkaflokkurin), Union Party (Sambandsflokkurin) and the Social Democratic Party (Javnaðarflokkurin) with Jóannes Eidesgaard as Prime Minister. The letters for these political parties are A, B and C and therefore this cabinet was called the ABC cabinet or the ABC coalition (ABC landsstýrið or ABC samgongan).

	Minister	Party	From	Until
Prime Minister	Jóannes Eidesgaard	JF	3 February 2004	4 February 2008
Deputy Prime Minister	Bjarni Djurholm	FF	3 February 2004	4 February 2008
Ministry	Minister	Party	From	Until
Ministry of Social Affairs and Health	Hans Pauli Strøm	JF	3 February 2004	4 February 2008
Ministry of Fisheries and Resources	Bjørn Kalsø	SB	25 February 2004	4 February 2008
	Johan Dahl	SB	3 February 2004	23 February 2008
Ministry of Finance	Magni Laksáfoss	SB	15 May 2007	4 February 2008
	Bárður Nielsen	SB	3 February 2004	9 May 2007
Ministry of Internal Affairs	Heðin Zachariasen	FF	23 November 2007	25 January 2008
	Jacob Vestergaard	FF	1 December 2005	23 November 2007
	Jógvan við Keldu	FF	3 February 2004	1 December 2005
Ministry of Culture	Jógvan á Lakjuni	FF	3 February 2004	4 February 2008
Ministry of Trade and Industry	Bjarni Djurholm	FF	3 February 2004	4 February 2008
