= Álvur Kirke =

Faroese docker and politician

Álvur Kirke (born 29 July 1939 in Vágur) is a former Faroese docker and politician (MF). He worked on the wharf in Tórshavn from 1972 onwards. He was one of the founders of the Christian democratic party Miðflokkurin in 1992, and was a member of the board of the party until 2004. Kirke was chairman of the party from 1992 until 1994, and again from 1999 until 2001, succeeded on both occasions by Jenis av Rana. Kirke was a candidate for the Lagtinget in 1994, 1998, 2002, 2004 and 2008 representing South Streymoy. He was the first deputy representative to the Løgting from 1998 to 2002, and for shorter periods he took seat in the Løgting as suppleant for Jenis av Rana.
