= List of health ministers of the Faroe Islands =

Health Minister (Faroese: landsstýrismaðurin í heilsumálum or heilsumálaráðharrin) has been a governmental ministerial post since 1968 in the government of the Faroe Islands. Health affairs have mostly been a part of a larger ministry, often along with social affairs, but since 2008 it has been a separate ministry.

Period	Name	Party	Ministry
1968–1970	Jacob Lindenskov	Javnaðarflokkurin	Ministry of Health, Social Affairs and Industry
1975–1979	Jacob Lindenskov	Javnaðarflokkurin	Ministry of Health, Social Affairs, Industry and Justice
1979–1981	Vilhelm Johannesen	Javnaðarflokkurin	Ministry of Health, Social Affairs, Industry and Justice
1981–1985	Páll Vang	Fólkaflokkurin	Ministry of Agriculture, Health, Transport and Justice
1985–1989	Jógvan Durhuus	Tjóðveldisflokkurin	Ministry of Agriculture, School and Health
1989	Tordur Niclasen	Kristiligi Fólkaflokkurin	Social and Health Ministry
1989–1991	Olaf Olsen	Fólkaflokkurin	Ministry of Industry, Health and Agriculture
1991–1994	Jóannes Eidesgaard	Javnaðarflokkurin	Ministry of Social, Health and Labour Ministry
1994–1996	Andrias Petersen	Javnaðarflokkurin	Social and Health Ministry
1996	Axel H. Nolsøe	Verkamannafylkingin	Ministry of Social Affairs, Health, Labour, Safety and Justice
1996–1998	Kristian Magnussen	Verkamannafylkingin	Ministry of Social Affairs, Health, Labour, Safety and Justice
1998	Óli Jacobsen	Verkamannafylkingin	Ministry of Social Affairs, Health, Labour, Safety and Justice
1998–2001	Helena Dam á Neystabø	Sjálvstýrisflokkurin	Social and Health Ministry
2001–2002	Sámal Petur í Grund	Sjálvstýrisflokkurin	Social and Health Ministry
2002–2004	Bill Justinussen	Miðflokkurin	Family- and Health Ministry
2004–2009	Hans Pauli Strøm	Javnaðarflokkurin	Health Ministry
2009–2011	Aksel V. Johannesen	Javnaðarflokkurin	Health Ministry
2011	John Johannessen	Javnaðarflokkurin	Health Ministry
2011–2015	Karsten Hansen	Miðflokkurin	Health Ministry
2015–2019	Sirið Stenberg	Tjóðveldi	Health Ministry
2019-	Kaj Leo Johannesen	Sambandsflokkurin	Health Ministry
