= 2008 Faroese general election =

Danish territorial election

- 19 January 2008
Party	Leader	Vote %	Seats	+/–
Republic	Høgni Hoydal	23.3%	8	0
Union	Kaj Leo Johannesen	21.0%	7	0
People's	Jørgen Niclasen	20.1%	7	0
Social Democratic	Jóannes Eidesgaard	19.3%	6	−1
Centre	Jenis av Rana	8.4%	3	+1
Sjálvstýri	Kári P. Højgaard	7.2%	2	+1
This lists parties that won seats. See the complete results below.
Prime Minister before	Prime Minister
Jóannes Eidesgaard; Social Democratic	Jóannes Eidesgaard; Social Democratic

General elections were held in the Faroe Islands on 19 January 2008, the latest possible date. Sjálvstýri and the Centre Party gained a seat each while the Social Democratic Party lost a seat.

It had been considered to amend the election law to hold the election two weeks later to pass a number of important bills before the election, but in the end the negotiations on this failed and the election was called on 2007-12-07. Prior to this election, the electoral system was changed in 2007 from a system with seven multi-member constituencies, which had some elements of mixed member proportional voting, to a system with a single constituency for the whole country in order to reduce disproportionality.

Prior to the election, the Social Democratic Party formed a centrist unionist government with the People's Party and the Union Party. After the elections, four days of negotiations saw a centre-left separatist government emerge; while the Social Democratic Party retained the PM's post, the strongly pro-independence Republic got the majority of ministerial posts (including the newly created post of foreign minister). The Centre Party also participated in the new government. Among the coalition agreement points was a plan to draft a constitution for the Faroe Islands, which would be approved in a referendum to be held in 2010.

The coalition broke up in mid-2008, however, and a government consisting of the parties governing before the 2008 election was sworn in on 26 September 2008, with Kaj Leo Johannesen as PM instead.

== Results ==
Party	Votes	%	Seats	+/–
Republic	7,250	23.30	8	0
Union Party	6,529	20.99	7	0
People's Party	6,240	20.06	7	0
Social Democratic Party	6,018	19.34	6	–1
Centre Party	2,610	8.39	3	+1
Sjálvstýri	2,244	7.21	2	+1
Students' Party	221	0.71	0	New
Total	31,112	100.00	33	+1
Valid votes	31,112	99.79		
Invalid/blank votes	65	0.21		
Total votes	31,177	100.00		
Registered voters/turnout	34,835	89.50		
Source: Logting

== See also ==
- List of members of the Løgting, 2008–11
