= 1998 Faroese general election =

Danish territorial election

- 30 April 1998
Party	Leader	Vote %	Seats	+/–
Republic	Heini O. Heinesen	23.8%	8	+4
Social Democratic	Jóannes Eidesgaard	21.9%	7	+2
People's	Anfinn Kallsberg	21.3%	8	+2
Union	Edmund Joensen	18.0%	6	−2
Self-Government	Helena Dam á Neystabø	7.6%	2	0
Centre	Bill Justinussen	4.1%	1	−1
This lists parties that won seats. See the complete results below.
Prime Minister before	Prime Minister
Edmund Joensen; Union	Anfinn Kallsberg; People's

General elections were held in the Faroe Islands on 30 April 1998.

== Results ==
Party	Votes	%	Seats	+/–
Republican Party	6,584	23.78	8	+4
Social Democratic Party	6,063	21.90	7	+2
People's Party	5,886	21.26	8	+2
Union Party	4,995	18.04	6	–2
Self-Government Party	2,116	7.64	2	0
Centre Party	1,125	4.06	1	–1
Christian People's Party	698	2.52	0	–2
Workers' Union	215	0.78	0	–3
Total	27,682	100.00	32	0
Valid votes	27,682	99.30		
Invalid/blank votes	194	0.70		
Total votes	27,876	100.00		
Registered voters/turnout	31,609	88.19		
Source: Løgting

== See also ==
- List of members of the Løgting, 1998–2002
