= Páll Vang =

Faroese politician (1949–2023)

Minister of Agriculture, Health, Transport and Justice
- In office 5 January 1981 – 10 January 1985
- Preceded by: Vilhelm Johannesen
- Succeeded by: Jógvan Durhuus

Personal details
- Born: 8 August 1949 Tvøroyri, Faroe Islands
- Died: 3 January 2023 (aged 73)
- Party: A
- Education: Holbæk Seminarium

Páll Vang (8 August 1949 – 3 January 2023) was a Faroese politician. A member of the People's Party, he served as Minister of Agriculture, Health, Transport and Justice from 1981 to 1985.

Vang died on 3 January 2023, at the age of 73.
