= 1994 Faroese general election =

Danish territorial election

- 7 July 1994
Party	Leader	Vote %	Seats	+/–
Union	Edmund Joensen	23.42	8	+2
People's	Anfinn Kallsberg	16.01	6	−1
Social Democratic	Marita Petersen	15.32	5	−5
Republic	Heini O. Heinesen	13.72	4	0
Workers' Union	Óli Jacobsen	9.47	3	New
Christian People's	Niels Pauli Danielsen	6.28	2	0
Centre	Jenis av Rana	5.83	2	New
Self-Government	Hilmar Kass	5.62	2	−1
This lists parties that won seats. See the complete results below.
Prime Minister before	Prime Minister
Marita Petersen; Social Democratic	Edmund Joensen; Union

General elections were held in the Faroe Islands on 7 July 1994.

== Results ==
Party	Votes	%	Seats	+/–
Union Party	5,986	23.42	8	+2
People's Party	4,093	16.01	6	–1
Social Democratic Party	3,917	15.32	5	–5
Republican Party	3,507	13.72	4	0
Workers' Union	2,421	9.47	3	New
Christian People's Party	1,606	6.28	2	0
Centre Party	1,491	5.83	2	New
Self-Government Party	1,437	5.62	2	–1
Faroese Party	616	2.41	0	New
Freedom Union	487	1.91	0	New
Total	25,561	100.00	32	0
Valid votes	25,561	98.70		
Invalid/blank votes	336	1.30		
Total votes	25,897	100.00		
Registered voters/turnout	31,373	82.55		
Source: Árbók fyri Føroyar 2003

== See also ==
- List of members of the Løgting, 1994–98
