= Demmus Hentze =

Faroese politician and lawyer

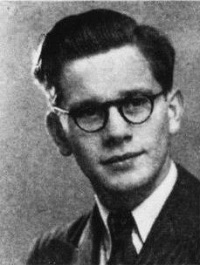
- Demmus Hentze

Finance Minister of the Faroe Islands
- In office 11 January 1975 – 5 January 1981
- Prime Minister: Atli Dam
- Preceded by: Peter F. Christiansen
- Succeeded by: Tórbjørn Poulsen

Personal details
- Born: 4 December 1923 Sandur, Faroe Islands
- Died: 3 January 2016 (aged 92) Tórshavn, Faroe Islands
- Children: 3

Demmus Hentze (4 December 1923 – 3 January 2016) was a Faroese politician and lawyer. He served as the Finance Minister of the Faroe Islands from 1975 to 1981.

A native of Sandoy, he went to Tórshavn to attend the Preliminer School and after that he continued school at the newly established High School (Føroya Studentaskeið) where he finished in 1942. During the World War 2 the Faroe Islands were occupied by the UK and Denmark was occupied by Germany and therefore it was not possible to travel between the two countries during the war. Hentze had to wait until the war was over before he could move to Denmark to study law. He graduated from University of Copenhagen with a cand jur. degree in 1952, he was a lawyer who was entitled to plead before the "landsret" (the Danish High Court). He had his own law firm, Advokatskrivstovan Hentze from 1981–2010. He established the firm together with his daughter Turið Debes Hentze.

Hentze represented his hometown in the Løgting twice, from 1966 to 1974, then 1978 to 1980. A member of the People's Party, Hentze served as Finance Minister from 1975 to 1981.

He died on 3 January 2016, in Tórshavn.

== Family ==
Demmus Hentze came from Uttastovu í Trøðum, Sandur, the son of farmer Johan Petur Hentze and Sunneva, born Clementsen, from Húsavík. He was the seventh of nine children. He was married to Helena, born Debes, she was the daughter of Sámal Debes av Bakka (in Tórshavn) and Annu Djurhuus from Kollafjørður. They had three daughters, Turið Debes Hentze, a lawyer, Bergljót Debes Hentze, an employee of the Kringvarp Føroya and Anna Debes Henze, who is psychologist.
