= West Nordic Council =

Multi-country cooperative forum

- Logo

- Map of member states
- Headquarters: Reykjavík, Iceland

Establishment
  - Established: September 24, 1985; 41 years ago in Nuuk, Greenland
- Website www.vestnordisk.is/english/

The West Nordic Council (Danish: Vestnordisk Råd, Greenlandic: Nunat Avannarliit Killiit Siunnersuisoqatigiiffiat, Faroese: Útnorðurráðið, Icelandic: Vestnorræna ráðið) is a cooperative forum for the parliaments and governments of Greenland, the Faroe Islands, and Iceland. It was initially founded in 1985 as the West Nordic Parliamentarian Council of Cooperation, but the name was changed in 1997. The council is composed of six MPs from each nation appointed by their respective parliaments. The annual general meeting of the council rotates between the members and is its highest authority. A presidium of three members, including the council's president, oversees the organization of its work and activities.

The nations of the Council share a somewhat common recent history: Greenland and the Faroes are autonomous territories of Denmark and Iceland is a former Danish possession. They also share a similar economic base, all being dependent on fisheries. The council's main objectives are:

- To promote West Nordic (North Atlantic) interests.
- To be guardians of north Atlantic resources and North Atlantic culture and to help to promote West Nordic interests through the West Nordic governments – not least with regard to the serious issues of resource management, pollution, etc.
- To follow up on the governments' West Nordic cooperation.
- To work with the Nordic Council and to be the West Nordic link in Nordic cooperation.
- To act as the parliamentary link for inter-West Nordic organizations, including Arctic parliamentary cooperation.

The West Nordic Council is separate from the Nordic Council, although all of the members of the West Nordic Council are also members of the Nordic Council and there is some cooperation between the two.

== General meetings and leadership ==
No.	Location	Year	Elected president
1st	Nuuk	1985	Jens K. Lyberth
2nd		1986	Páll Pétursson
3rd		1987	Hans Jacob Debes
4th		1988	Preben Lange
5th		1989	Friðjón Þórðarson
6th		1990	Karin Kjølbro
7th		1991	Jonathan Motzfeldt
8th		1992	Steingrímur J. Sigfússon
9th		1993	Lisbeth L. Petersen
10th		1994	Jonathan Motzfeldt
11th	Qaqortoq	1995	Árni Johnsen
12th	Vestmannaeyjar	1996	Lisbeth L. Petersen
13th	Øravík	1997	Jonathan Motzfeldt
14th	Ilulissat	1998	Ísólfur Gylfi Pálmason
15th	Skeiðahreppur	1999	Jógvan Durhuus
16th	Tórshavn	2000	Ole Lynge
17th	Nuuk	2001	Hjálmar Árnason
18th	Stykkishólmur	2002	Jógvan á Lakjuni
19th	Eiði	2003	Jonathan Motzfeldt
20th	Narsarsuaq	2004	Birgir Ármannsson
21st	Ísafjörður	2005	Henrik Old
22nd	Tórshavn	2006	Jonathan Motzfeldt
23rd	Nuuk	2007	Karl V. Matthíasson
24th	Grundarfjörður	2008	Kári P. Højgaard
25th	Runavík and Tórshavn	2009	Josef Motzfeldt
26th	Tasiilaq	2010	Ólína Þorvarðardóttir
27th	Bifröst University	2011	Kári P. Højgaard
28th		2012	Josef Motzfeldt
29th		2013	Unnur Brá Konráðsdóttir
30th	Vestmannaeyjar	2014	Bill Justinussen
31st	Runavík	2015	Lars Emil Johansen
32nd		2016	Bryndís Haraldsdóttir
33rd		2017	
34th		2018	
35th		2019	
36th		2020	
37th		2021	Kim Kielsen
38th	Nuuk	2022	Steinunn Þóra Árnadóttir
39th	Reykjavík	2023	Jenis av Rana
40th		2024	

== See also ==
- Hoyvík Agreement – an Iceland-Faroes free trade agreement that might be expanded to Greenland creating a West Nordic free trade zone
- Arctic cooperation and politics
