= Edva =

Edva or EDVA may refer to:

== People ==
- Edva Jacobsen (born 1964), a Faroese economist and politician
- Guillaume Edva, Haitian politician who stoof for election in the 2015–16 Haitian parliamentary election

== Places ==
- Edva, a tributary of the Vym River in the Komi Republic of Russia in Europe
- Edva, a station on the Northern Latitudinal Railway in Yamalia, Tuyven, Ural District, Western Siberia, Russia; in Asia
- Flugplatz Bad Gandersheim (ICAO airport code EDVA), Northeim, Lower Saxony, Germany
- United States District Court for the Eastern District of Virginia (E.D.Va., EDVA), Virginia, USA

== Other uses ==
- Elektronische Datenverarbeitung Anlage (EDVA, EDV-Anlage), an abbreviation used to name early East German computers, such as the VEB Robotron
