= Steffan Klein Poulsen =

Faroese politician (born 1996)

Member of the Løgting
- Incumbent
- Assumed office 31 August 2019

Personal details
- Born: 19 April 1996 (age 30)
- Party: Centre Party
- Spouse: Rebekka Fuglø (m. 2021)

Steffan Klein Poulsen (born 19 April 1996) is a Faroese politician serving as a member of the Løgting since 2019. He is currently the leader of the Centre Party, having taken over from longtime leader Jenis av Rana following the 2026 Faroese general election.

== Background ==
He previously served as chairman of the student council at the school in Kambsdalur. He is married to Rebekka Fuglø.
