= Gunvør Balle =

Faroese politician (born 1967)

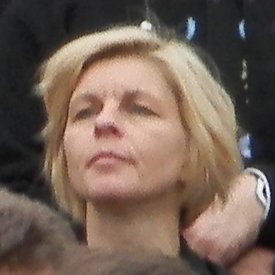
- Balle in 2012

Member of Tórshavn City Council
- Incumbent
- Assumed office 2017

Member of the Løgting
- In office 2011–2015

Envoy of the Faroe Islands to Iceland
- In office 2007–2010

Personal details
- Born: 21 March 1967 (age 59) Torshavn, Faroe Islands
- Party: Republic
- Spouse: Sigurð í Jákupsstovu
- Children: 4
- Education: Copenhagen Business School
- Occupation: Politician; diplomat

Gunvør Balle (born 31 March 1967) is a Faroese Republic politician and diplomat who served in the Løgting from 2011 until 2015 and is currently serving in Tórshavn City Council. Prior to her entry in politics, she worked in sales management and was a Ministry of Foreign Affairs diplomat who served as the Faroe Islands' envoy to Iceland from 2007 until 2010.

== Biography ==
Gunvør Balle was born on 31 March 1967 in Torshavn; her mother Margreta Mohr was Faroese and her father Sten Balle was a E. Pihl & Søn manager from Denmark. She was raised in the Sandágerði area and educated the Føroya Studentaskúli og HF-Skeið, graduating in 1985.

After spending two years with her friends traveling around the world, she then was educated at Copenhagen Business School, where she was part of their SPRØK programme and obtained her cand.merc (candidata mercaturae) degree in 1993, and she briefly worked in Danish loudspeaker manufacturer Peerless' sales department. She later spent a few years living in Qatar with her husband Sigurð í Jákupsstovu, a petrol engineer (and future rector of the University of the Faroe Islands) who worked for Maersk Oil as part of their dealings in the area. Gunvør was a sales manager at Torshavn Shipyard and a director of PAM Offshore Service until 2005, when she was hired by the Ministry of Foreign Affairs, where she served as their envoy in Iceland from 2007 until 2010. Afterwards she was one of the co-founders of P/F Atlantic Biotechnology on Oyri.

She was elected to the Løgting in the 2011 Faroese general election for Republic. She was part of the country's West Nordic Council delegation, as well as the cultural, judiciary, and welfare committees. She did not run in the 2015 Faroese general election. Later, she was later elected to Tórshavn City Council in 2016, receiving second place in the 2016 Tórshavn City Council elections, and she was elected as deputy mayor the same year. She also served within the council's education committee, having left by 2020.

She has four children with her husband and she is the daughter-in-law of marine biologist Hjalti í Jákupsstovu.
