= Uni Rasmussen =

Faroese politician (born 1968)

Uni Rasmussen (born 1968) is a Faroese politician.

In 2022, he was the Minister of Finance, as a member of the People's Party.

== Personal life ==
Rasmussen lives in Norðragøta and is married to Emma. He is blind and has a guide dog named Luna.
