= Faroese National Badminton Championships =

Badminton tournament in the Faroe Islands

The Faroese National Badminton Championships is a tournament organized to crown the best badminton players in Faroe Islands. They've been held since the season 1966.

== Past winners ==
Year	Men's singles	Women's singles	Men's doubles	Women's doubles	Mixed doubles
1966	Poul Michelsen	no competition	Jan Joensen; Gudmund Niclasen	no competition	no competition
1967	Poul Michelsen	no competition	Jan Joensen; Gudmund Niclasen	no competition	no competition
1968	Poul Michelsen	no competition	Poul Michelsen; Jóan P. Midjord	no competition	no competition
1969	Poul Michelsen	no competition	Jan Joensen; Gudmund Niclasen	no competition	no competition
1970	Poul Michelsen	no competition	Poul Michelsen; Jóan P. Midjord	no competition	no competition
1971	Poul Michelsen	no competition	Poul Michelsen; Jóan P. Midjord	no competition	no competition
1972	Poul Michelsen	no competition	Poul Michelsen; Jóan P. Midjord	no competition	no competition
1973	Poul Michelsen	Sigrid Andreasen	Poul Michelsen; Jóan P. Midjord	Sigrid Andreasen; Gudbjørg Smith	no competition
1974	Poul Michelsen	Sigrid Andreasen	Poul Michelsen; Jóan P. Midjord	Sigrid Andreasen; Gudbjørg Smith	no competition
1975	Poul Michelsen	Margit Svarrer	Eigil Lyngsoe; Svend Stensborg	Sigrid Andreasen; Gudbjørg Smith	no competition
1976	Hans J. Stenberg	Sigrid Andreasen	Kári Nielsen; Jóan P. Midjord	Sigrid Andreasen; Gudbjørg Smith	Jóan P. Midjord; Margrit Svarrer
1977	Kári Nielsen	Sigrid Andreasen	Kári Nielsen; Petur Hansen	Torgerð Nielsen; Sólrun Michelsen	Jóan P. Midjord; Margrit Svarrer
1978	Kári Nielsen	Sigrid Andreasen	Kári Nielsen; Petur Hansen	Lydia Arge; Margit Svarrer	Jóan P. Midjord; Margrit Svarrer
1979	Kári Nielsen	Sigrid Andreasen	Kári Nielsen; Petur Hansen	Lydia Arge; Margit Svarrer	Jóan P. Midjord; Sigrid Andreasen
1980	Kári Nielsen	Sigrid Andreasen	Kári Nielsen; Petur Hansen	Elna Joensen; Margit Svarrer	Jóan P. Midjord; Sigrid Andreasen
1981	Petur Hansen	Sigrid Andreasen	Kári Nielsen; Petur Hansen	Elna Joensen; Margit Svarrer	Jóan P. Midjord; Margrit Svarrer
1982	Kári Nielsen	Sigrid Andreasen	Kári Nielsen; Jóan P. Midjord	Elna Joensen; Margit Svarrer	Per Andersen; Margit Svarrer
1983	Kári Nielsen	Sigrid Andreasen	Kári Nielsen; Jóan P. Midjord	Karin Mikkelsen; Diana Hansen	Kári Nielsen; Bjørg Djurhuus
1984	Jákup Midjord	Sigrid Andreasen	Kári Nielsen; Petur Hansen	Elna Joensen; Margit Svarrer	Kári Nielsen; Bjørg Djurhuus
1985	Jákup Midjord	Bjørg Djurhuus	Heðin Joensen; Djóni Ziska	Marjun Niclasen; Bjørg Djurhuus	Petur Hansen; Bjørg Djurhuus
1986	Heðin Joensen	Marjun Niclassen	Jákup Midjord; Jóan P. Midjord	Ulla Svarrer Wang; Unn Jacobsen	Jákup Midjord; Marjun Niclasen
1987	Heðin Joensen	Anbritt Schiller	Jákup Midjord; Jóan P. Midjord	Anbritt Schiller; Harriet Rasmussen	Sven Stensborg; Vinnie Stensborg
1988	Jákup Midjord	Harriet Rasmussen	Jákup Midjord; Jóan P. Midjord	Harriet Rasmussen; Annika Berg	Jákup Midjord; Vinnie Stensborg
1989	Heðin Joensen	Harriet Rasmussen	Gunnar M. Gregoriussen; Petur Hansen	Annika Borg; Sigrid Olsen	Mortan Stensborg; Harriet Rasmussen
1990	Heðin Joensen	Harriet Rasmussen	Heðin Joensen; Gunnar M. Gregoriussen	Harriet Rasmussen; Annika Berg	Mortan Stensborg; Harriet Rasmussen
1991	Jákup Midjord	Harriet Rasmussen	Heðin Joensen; Gunnar M. Gregoriussen	Harriet Rasmussen; Annika Berg	Hans a Lag; Hariet Rasmussen
1992	Jákup Midjord	Harriet Rasmussen	Heðin Joensen; Gunnar M. Gregoriussen	Harriet Rasmussen; Annika Berg	Mortan Stensborg; Annika Berg
1993	Hans á Lag	Guðrun Jacobsen	Petur Lauritsen; Mortan Stensberg	Gudrun Jacobsen; Elin Jacobsen	Hans á Lag; Guðrun Jacobsen
1994	Hans á Lag	Harriet Rasmussen	Jákup Midjord; Hans á Lag	Harriet Rasmussen; Annika Berg	Mortan Stensborg; Annika Berg
1995	Gunnar M. Gregoriussen	Guðrun Jacobsen	Rani í Líð; Erland Poulsen	Gudrun Jacobsen; Ingun Hansen	Herman Eysturoy; Guðrun Jacobsen
1996	Erland Poulsen	Ingun Hansen	Erland Poulsen; Absalon Eysturoy	Guðrun Jacobsen; Annika Berg	Erland Poulsen; Annika Berg
1997	Erland Poulsen	Guðrun Jacobsen	Heðin Joensen; Gunnar M. Gregoriussen	Guðrun Jacobsen; Annika Berg	Jákup Midjord; Guðrun Jacobsen
1998	Erland Poulsen	Guðrun Jacobsen	Hedin Joensen; Gunnar M. Gregoriussen	Guðrun Jacobsen; Annika Berg	Jákup Midjord; Guðrun Jacobsen
1999	Erland Poulsen	Guðrun Jacobsen	Erland Poulsen; Ragnar Rasmussen	Guðrun Jacobsen; Annika Berg	Erland Poulsen; Annika Berg
2000	Ragnar Rasmussen	Ingun Hansen	Heðin Joensen; Gunnar M. Gregoriussen	Guðrun Jacobsen; Annika Berg	Erland Poulsen; Elin Jacobsen
2001	Erland Poulsen	Ingun Hansen	Rúni Orloff; Rani í Líð	Ingun Hansen; Kristianna Thorkildshøj	Erland Poulsen; Guðri Poulsen
2002	Erland Poulsen	Guðri Poulsen	Runi Orloff; Rani í Líð	Ingun Hansen; Kristianna Torkilshoj	Erland Poulsen; Guðri Poulsen
2003	Bjartur Lamhauge	Ingun Hansen	Bjartur Lamhauge; Aksel Poulsen	Ingun Hansen; Guðri Poulsen	Erland Poulsen; Guðri Poulsen
2004	Bjartur Lamhauge	Guðri Poulsen	Bjartur Lamhauge; Aksel Poulsen	Guðri Poulsen; Guðrun Jacobsen	
2005	Ragnar Rasmussen	Guðri Poulsen	Bjartur Lamhauge; Aksel Poulsen	Guðri Poulsen; Nicola Gram	Aksel Poulsen; Brynhild Djurhuus Carlsson
2006	Niclas Eysturoy	Guðri Poulsen	Bjartur Lamhauge; Aksel Poulsen	Guðri Poulsen; Brynhild Djurhuus Carlsson	Niclas Eystuoy; Guðri Poulsen
2007	Niclas Eysturoy	Guðri Poulsen	Niclas Eysturoy; Hilmar Kass Jacobsen	Guðri Poulsen; Brynhild Djurhuus Carlsson	Aksel Poulsen; Bjørg Djurhuus
2008	Niclas Eysturoy	Guðri Poulsen		Guðri Poulsen; Guðrun Jacobsen	
2009	Aksel Poulsen	Sigrun Smith	Aksel Poulsen; Absalon Eysturoy	Guðri Poulsen; Sigrun Smith	Aksel Poulsen; Rannvá Djurhuus Carlsson
2010	Aksel Poulsen	Rannvá Djurhuus Carlsson	Aksel Poulsen; Gunnar Poulsen		
2011	Aksel Poulsen	Sigrun Smith	Hilmar Kass Jacobsen; Niclas Eysturoy	Sigrun Smith; Guðri Poulsen	Niclas Eysturoy; Sigrun Smith
2012	Niclas Højgaard Eysturoy	Rannvá Djurhuus Carlsson	Aksel Poulsen; Niclas Højgaard Eysturoy	Rannvá Djurhuus Carlsson; Guðri Poulsen	Aksel Poulsen; Rannvá Djurhuus Carlsson
2013	Niclas Højgaard Eysturoy	Rannvá Djurhuus Carlsson	Benjamin Gunnarstein; Niclas Højgaard Eysturoy	Rannvá Djurhuus Carlsson; Brynhild Djurhuus Carlsson	Aksel Poulsen; Rannvá Djurhuus Carlsson
2014	Benjamin Gunnarstein	Rannvá Djurhuus Carlsson	Benjamin Gunnarstein; Nikolaj Gunnarstein	Rannvá Djurhuus Carlsson; Brynhild Djurhuus Carlsson	Aksel Poulsen; Rannvá Djurhuus Carlsson
2015	Benjamin Gunnarstein	Rannvá Djurhuus Carlsson	Benjamin Gunnarstein; Nikolaj Gunnarstein	Rannvá Djurhuus Carlsson; Brynhild Djurhuus Carlsson	Aksel Poulsen; Rannvá Djurhuus Carlsson
2016	Bartal Poulsen	Kristina Eriksen	Benjamin Gunnarstein; Magnus Dal-Christiansen	Kristina Eriksen; Gunnva Jacobsen	Niclas Højgaard Eysturoy; Brynhild Djurhuus Carlsson
2017	Benjamin Gunnarstein	Rannvá Djurhuus Carlsson	Benjamin Gunnarstein; Magnus Dal-Christiansen	Kristina Eriksen; Gunnva Jacobsen	Benjamin Gunnarstein; Rannvá Djurhuus Carlsson
2018	Bartal Poulsen	Gunnva Jacobsen	Aksel Poulsen; Magnus Dal-Christiansen	Simone Romme; Lena Maria Joensen	Magnus Dal-Christiansen; Gunnva Jacobsen
