= Hans á Lag =

Faroese sportsman (born 1974)

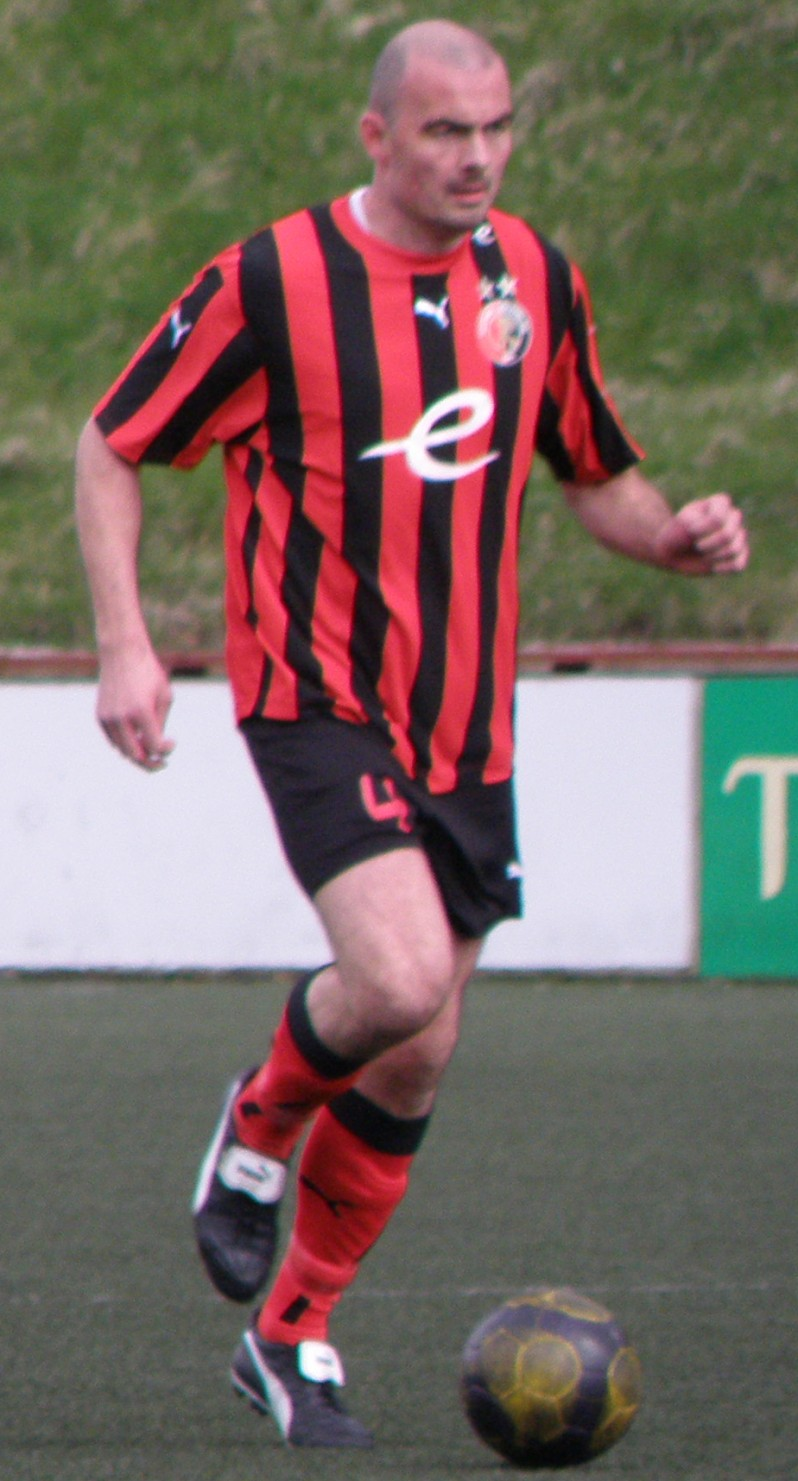
- Hans á Lag playing for HB Tórshavn vs. FC Suðuroy on 29 May 2010 in Vágur

Personal information
- Date of birth: 26 September 1974 (age 52)
- Place of birth: Tórshavn, Faroe Islands
- Height: 1.85 m (6 ft 1 in)
- Position: Defender

Youth career
- HB Tórshavn

Senior career*
Years	Team	Apps	(Gls)
1995–2011	HB Tórshavn	208	(34)
1994–2011	HB Tórshavn II	21	(3)
- * Club domestic league appearances and goals as of 19 July 2011

Hans á Lag (born 26 September 1974) is a Faroese former sportsman. He is a former football player, former badminton player and former handball player. Hon won the Faroese championship in the men's badminton two times in 1993 and 1994 and the Faroese championship in the Faroe Islands Premier League six times. He has also won the Faroese championship in handball with Kyndil as a goal keeper in 1994 and 1996. Hans á Lag used to have another lastname, which was Jacobsen.

== Football career ==
Hans á Lag played as a defender for HB Tórshavn in the best division of the Faroe Islands his entire football career as an adult from 1995 until 2011. He also played with HB Tórshavn as a child and young boy and won the Faroese championship several times; in 1983 1985 and 1992 with HB. He also won the Faroese championship with HB in the top tier six times between 1998 and 2010. Hans á Lag has not been a member of the national team in football. The newspaper Sosialurin mentioned in an article in September 1999 that it had been an issue several times that he might be selected for the national team, but it never happened. The headline of the article says "Hans á Lag brotið beinið", which means Hans á Lag has broken his leg. The article says he was one of the most important players of the HB defence together with team mate and national player Hans Fróði Hansen. The same article mentions that he also played as a goal keeper for the handball team Kyndil for many years, he played handball in the winther and football in the summer, but he would stop playing handball, as it was difficult to play both sports and find time for both sports.

=== UEFA matches ===
Hans á Lag has played some UEFA matches for HB Tórshavn. He played 10 matches in UEFA Champions League and scored two goals, one match in Europa League, two in UEFA Cup, two in Intertoto Cup and two in Cup Winners Cup. On 8 August 1996 he played against Dinamo Batumi. HB Tórshavn lost 0–6. On 13 July 2010 he played with HB Tórshavn against FC Red Bull Salzburg, which they lost 0–5. HB Tórshavn won their home match against FC Red Bull Salzburg, but Hans á Lag did not play that match, he was an unused substitute. On 13 July 2011 he played with HB Tórshavn in UEFA Champions League against Malmö FF. Malmö FF won the match 2–1.

== Badminton career ==
Hans á Lag played badminton earlier with Havnar Badmintonfelag from Tórshavn, and he won the Faroese National Badminton Championships several times.

- 1991 winner of Mixed doubles together with Harriet Rasmussen
- 1993 winner of the Men's single and Mixed doubles together with Guðrun Jacobsen
- 1994 winner of the Men's single and the Men's doubles together with Jákup Midjord

== Handball career ==
Hans á Lag has played handball for Kyndil. He played as goalkeeper. He won several medals for Kyndil when he was a child, and he also won the Faroese Championship in handball with Kyndil when he played for the best team in the Men's division. He played 133 matches and scored 27 goals for Kyndil.

== Honours ==
- Faroese champion with HB Tórshavn six times: in 1998, 2002, 2003, 2004, 2009 and 2010.
- He won the Faroe Islands Cup three times: 1995, 1998 and 2004.
- Won the Faroese championship in handball with Kyndil: 1996
- Faroese champion in badminton men's single two times: 1993 and 1994.
- Faroese champion in badminton mix double two times: 1991 and 1993.
- Faroese champion in badminton the men's double one time: 1994
