= LGBT Føroyar =

Political organization in the Faroe Islands

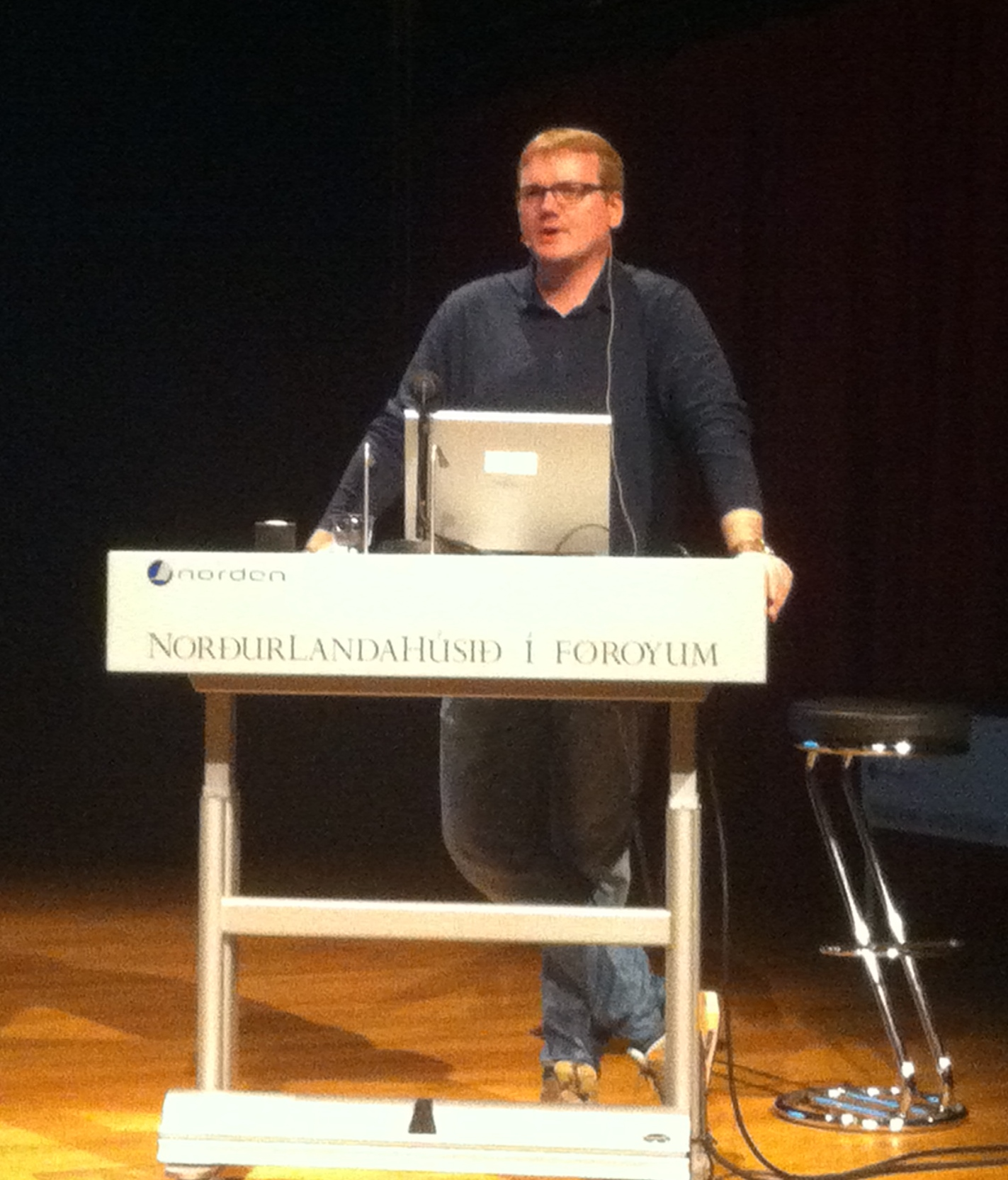
Eiler Vagraklett, chairman of LGBT Føroyar in 2015

LGBT Føroyar is a political lobbying organization for lesbian, gay, bisexual and transgender (LGBT) people in the Faroe Islands.

The organisation was founded on June 1, 2011. Its chairman is Eiller Vagraklett. The goal of the association is to work on political, social, cultural, workplace, and at every level of society for LGBT people. The association seeks to work against discrimination and pressure to influence legislators, for example in areas such as same-sex marriage, LGBT adoption, IVF treatment for lesbians and the rights of transgender people.

The group achieved a major campaign goal when same-sex marriage in the Faroe Islands was legalised by the Løgting (the Faroe Islands Parliament) on April 29, 2016, which came into force on July 1, 2017.
