= List of finance ministers of the Faroe Islands =

The finance minister of the Faroe Islands (in Faroese fíggjarmálaráðharrin or landsstýrismaðurin í fíggjarmálum) is an important part of the Faroese cabinet, (Føroya Landsstýri) and of the Faroese economy.

== Finance ministers ==
Period	Name	Party
1959–1963	Kristian Djurhuus	Union Party
1963–1967	Erlendur Patursson	Republic
1967–1970	Kristian Djurhuus	Union Party
1970–1975	Peter F. Christiansen	Union Party
1975–1981	Demmus Hentze	People's Party
1981–1985	Tórbjørn Poulsen	Sjálvstýri
1985–1989	Jóngerð Purkhús	Republic
1989	Finnbogi Ísakson	Republic
1989–1991	Ivan Johannesen	Union Party
1991–1993	Jógvan Sundstein	People's Party
1993–1994	Finnbogi Ísakson	Republic
1994–1996	Jóannes Eidesgaard	Social Democratic Party
1996–1998	Anfinn Kallsberg	People's Party
1998–2003	Karsten Hansen	Republic
2004–2007	Bárður á Steig Nielsen	Union Party
2007–2008	Magni Laksáfoss	Union Party
2008	Karsten Hansen	Centre Party
2008–2011	Jóannes Eidesgaard	Social Democratic Party
2011	Aksel V. Johannesen	Social Democratic Party
2011–2015	Jørgen Niclasen	People's Party
2015–2019	Kristina Háfoss	Republic
2019–2022	Jørgen Niclasen	People's Party
2022	Uni Rasmussen	People's Party
2022–2026	Ruth Vang	Progress
2026–present	Aksel V. Johannesen	Social Democratic Party
