= Tórbjørn Poulsen =

Danish politician (1932–2014)

Tórbjørn Poulsen (25 January 1932 – 7 November 2014) was a Faroese civil engineer, politician and member of the Self-Government Party. He served as the Finance Minister of the Faroe Islands, as well as the portfolios of Minister of Culture and Minister of Local Government (Kommunumálaráðharrar), in the government of Prime Minister Pauli Ellefsen, from 5 January 1981 until 11 January 1985. He was elected to the Løgting from Suðurstreymoy from 1988 to 1990.

Poulsen died in Tórshavn, Faroe Islands, on 7 November 2014, at the age of 82.
