= Ingeborg Vinther =

Faroese politician

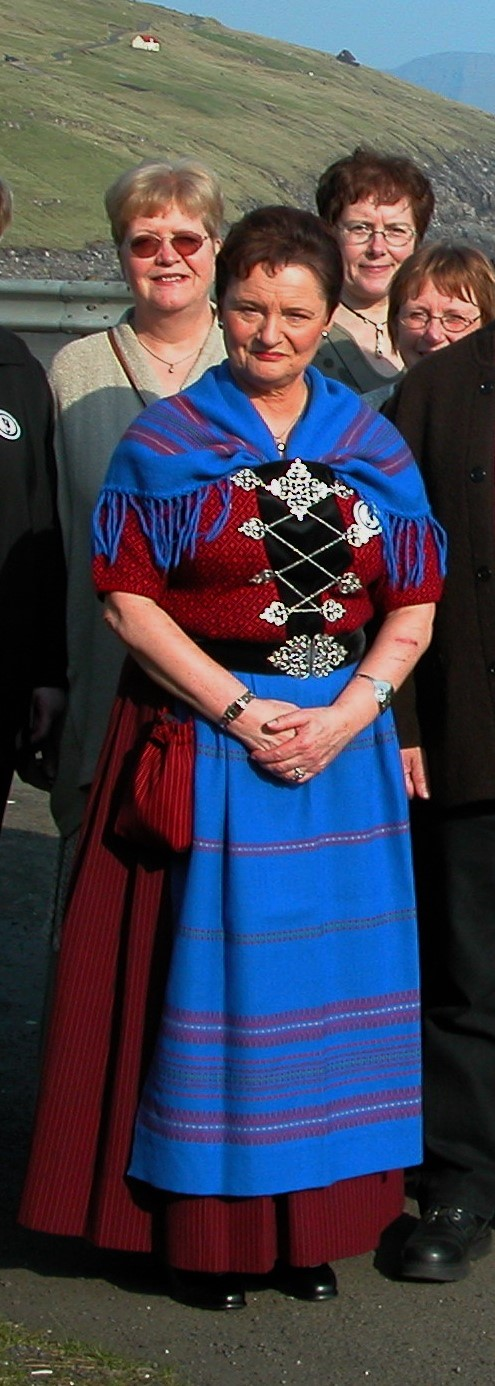
Vinther in 2004

Ingeborg Helena Vinther (born 11 May or September 1945) is a Faroese politician. She was a member of the Løgting, the parliament of the Faroe Islands, representing Suðuroy for the Workers' Union party, 1994-1998.

She was born in Vágur on 11 May or 11 September 1945.
