= Workers' Union (Faroe Islands) =

The Workers' Union (Faroese: Verkamannafylkingin, VMF) was a political party in the Faroe Islands.

== History ==
The party won three seats in the 1994 elections, taken by Óli Jacobsen, Kristian Magnussen and Ingeborg Vinther. It joined the governing coalition, with Jacobsen (1994–1995 and March–May 1998), Axel H. Nolsøe (1995–1996) and Magnussen (1996–1998) serving as Ministers. However, it lost all three seats in the 1998 elections, when it received just 215 votes. It did not contest any subsequent Løgting elections.
