= Edva Jacobsen =

Faroese politician

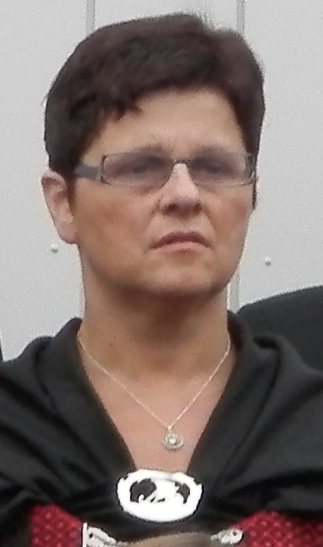
Edva Jacobsen

Edva Jacobsen (born 1964) is a Faroese economist and politician. On 29 October 2011, she was elected to serve in the Løgting (Faroese Parliament) as a member of the Union Party. She was not re-elected in 2015.

Born on 31 August 1964, Jacobsen lives in Fuglafjørður, a village on the east coast of Eysturoy. After working in banking for 25 years, she entered politics in 2010, substituting for Johan Dahl in the Løgting. She graduated in consumer economics in 2002, specializing in financial management.
