= Karsten Hansen =

Faroese politician

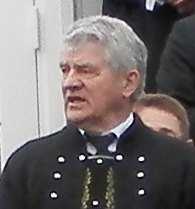
Karsten Hansen in 2012

Karsten Hansen is a Faroese politician who has served in various ministerial positions.

== Political career ==
Hansen first served as Minister of Finance from 15 May 1998 until 6 June 2002 as a member of Republic. He was reappointed and served in the position until 3 February 2004. On 4 February 2008, he was again appointed Minister of Finance. He served in the position until 26 September 2008.

In November 2011, as a member of the Centre Party, he was appointed Minister of Health Affairs.

Political offices
Preceded by Anfinn Kallsberg	Minister of Finance; 15 May 1998 – 6 June 2002	Succeeded by Karsten Hansen
Preceded by Karsten Hansen	Minister of Finance; 6 June 2002 – 3 February 2004	Succeeded by Bárður á Steig Nielsen
Preceded by Magni Laksáfoss	Minister of Finance; 4 February 2008 – 26 September 2008	Succeeded by Jóannes Eidesgaard
Preceded by John Johannessen	Minister of Health Affairs; November 2011 – 2015	Succeeded by Sirið Stenberg
