= List of ministers of internal affairs of the Faroe Islands =

The minister of internal affairs (Faroese: landsstýrismaðurin í innlendismálum or innlendismálaráðharrin) is responsible for the municipalities, the isolated and distant small islands (Útoyggjar), the infrastructure, police, the court, environment, issues regarding immigrants and the administration of Faroese political elections. For a short period in 2008 under Jóannes Eidesgaards second cabinet, this cabinet was called Ministry of Justice, but it was responsible for the same affairs.

Period	Name	Party	Ministry
2004–2005	Jógvan við Keldu	People's Party (Fólkaflokkurin)	Ministry of Internal Affairs
2005–2007	Jacob Vestergaard	People's Party (Fólkaflokkurin)	Ministry of Internal Affairs
2007–2008	Heðin Zachariasen	People's Party (Fólkaflokkurin)	Ministry of Internal Affairs
2008–2011	Annika Olsen [1st female]	People's Party (Fólkaflokkurin)	Ministry of Internal Affairs
2011	John Johannessen	Social Democratic Party (Javnaðarflokkurin)	Ministry of Internal Affairs
2011–2013	Kári P. Højgaard	Self-Government Party (Sjálvstýrisflokkurin)	Ministry of Internal Affairs
2015–2019	Henrik Old	Social Democratic Party (Javnaðarflokkurin)	Ministry of Internal Affairs

== See also ==
- Justice ministry
- Politics of the Faroe Islands
