= List of ministers of fisheries of the Faroe Islands =

The fishery minister (Faroese language: landsstýrismaðurin í fiskuvinnumálum or Fiskimálaráðharrin) is a member of the government of the Faroe Islands.

| Period | Name | Party | Ministry | | | | | | | | |
|---|---|---|---|---|---|---|---|---|---|---|---|
| 1959–1963 | Kristian Djurhuus | Sambandsflokkurin | Ministry of taxes, fisheries and justice | | | | | | | | |
| 1963–1967 | Erlendur Patursson | Tjóðveldisflokkurin | Ministry of finance, fisheries and justice | | | | | | | | |
| 1967–1968 | Kristian Djurhuus | Sambandsflokkurin | Ministry of finance, agriculture and fisheries | | | | | | | | |
| 1968–1970 | Villi Sørensen | Javnaðarflokkurin | Ministry of transport and fisheries | | | | | | | | |
| 1970 | Atli Dam | Javnaðarflokkurin | Ministry of transport and fisheries | | | | | | | | |
| 1970–1975 | Eli Nolsøe | Sambandsflokkurin | Ministry of fisheries, industry and justice | | | | | | | | |
| 1975–1979 | Petur Reinert | Tjóðveldisflokkurin | Ministry of fisheries and municipalities | | | | | | | | |
| 1979–1981 | Heðin M. Klein | Tjóðveldisflokkurin | Ministry of fisheries and municipalities | | | | | | | | |
| 1981–1983 | Olaf Olsen | Fólkaflokkurin | Ministry of fisheries and industry | | | | | | | | |
| 1983–1985 | Anfinn Kallsberg | Fólkaflokkurin | Ministry of fisheries and industry | | | | | | | | |
| 1989 | Anfinn Kallsberg | Fólkaflokkurin | Ministry of fisheries and municipalities | | | | | | | | |
| 1989–1991 | Jógvan I. Olsen | Sambandsflokkurin | Ministry of fisheries and energy | | | | | | | | |
| 1991–1993 | John Petersen | Fólkaflokkurin | Ministry of fisheries and agriculture | | | | | | | | |
| 1993–1994 | Thomas Arabo | Javnaðarflokkurin | Ministry of fisheries and industry | | | | | | | | |
| 1994–1996 | Ivan Johannesen | Sambandsflokkurin | Ministry of fisheries and oceanfarming | | | | | | | | |
| 1996–1998 | John Petersen | Fólkaflokkurin | Ministry of Fisheries | | | | | | | | |
| 1998–2003 | Jørgen Niclasen | Fólkaflokkurin | Ministry of Fisheries | | | | | | | | |
| 2003–2004 | Jacob Vestergaard | Fólkaflokkurin | Ministry of Fisheries | | | | | | | | |
| 2004 | Johan Dahl | Sambandsflokkurin | Ministry of Fisheries | | | | | | | | |
| 2004–2008 | Bjørn Kalsø | Sambandsflokkurin | Ministry of Fisheries | | | | | | | | |
| 2008 | Tórbjørn Jacobsen | Tjóðveldi | Ministry of Fisheries and resources | | | | | | | | |
| 2008–2011 | Jacob Vestergaard | Fólkaflokkurin | Ministry of Fisheries | | | | | | | | |
| 2011 | Johan Dahl | Sambandsflokkurin | Ministry of Fisheries | | | | | | | | |
| 2011–2012 | Jákup Mikkelsen | Fólkaflokkurin | Ministry of Fisheries | | | | | | | | |
| 2012–2015 | Jacob Vestergaard | Fólkaflokkurin | Ministry of Fisheries | | | | | | | | |
| 2015–2019 | Høgni Hoydal | Tjóðveldi | Ministry of Fisheries | | | | | | | | |
| 2019-2022 | Jacob Vestergaard | Fólkaflokkurin | Ministry of Fisheries | 2022-2022 | Árni Skaale | Fólkaflokkurin | Ministry of Fisheries | 2022- | Dennis Holm Jóhannesen | Tjóðveldi | Ministry of Fisheries |
