= Sirið Stenberg =

Faroese politician

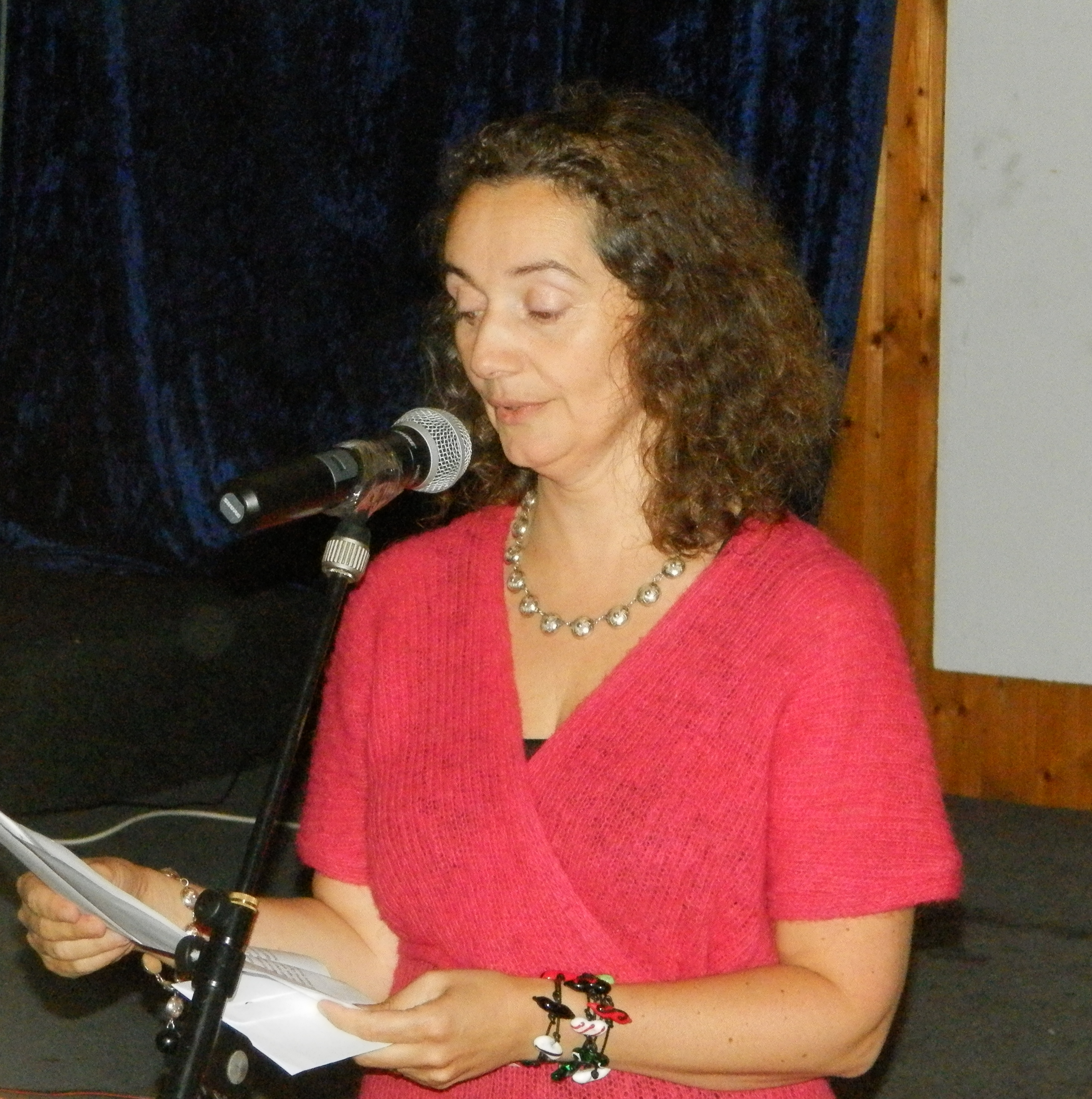
- Sirið Stenberg in 2014

Minister of Social Affairs and Culture
- Incumbent
- Assumed office 22 December 2022
- Prime Minister: Aksel V. Johannesen

Minister of Health
- In office 15 September 2015 – 16 September 2019
- Prime Minister: Aksel V. Johannesen
- Preceded by: Karsten Hansen
- Succeeded by: Kaj Leo Johannesen

Member of the Løgting
- Incumbent
- Assumed office 2011

Member of Vágur's Town Council
- In office 2009–2015

Personal details
- Born: 26 May 1968 (age 58) Vágur, Faroe Islands
- Party: Republic (Tjóðveldi)
- Spouse: Jón Pauli Olsen
- Children: 3

Sirið Stenberg (born 26 May 1968 in Vágur) is a Faroese politician. She finished her education as a nurse in 1994 and as a nurse in neonatalalogy in 1998 and as a nurse with special knowledge of children from 0-7 (Heilsufrøðingur in Faroese, Sundhedsplejerske in Danish, a health care visitor who attends to and gives advice to the mothers and their small children in their homes). Since 2001 she has worked in the children's health care in Suðuroy. She took leave from this employment shortly after assuming office as a member of the Faroese parliament, the parliament is located in Tórshavn, two hours away by ferry from Suðuroy. From 2006-08 she was head master of the Health School of the Faroe Islands, which is located in Suðuroy. She is married to Jón Pauli Olsen, who was football manager of the Faroese women's national football team and social and health assistant, together they have three children.

== Political career ==
She was elected to the Løgting representing Republic (Tjóðveldi) at the 2011 general election with 320 votes. She was a member of the town council of Vágur from 2009 - 2015. At the general elections of 2015 she was reelected to the Løgting. Her party formed government together with the Social Democratic Party and Progress and they chose Sirið Stenberg as the minister of health of the Faroe Islands.

=== Member of standing committees of the Løgting ===
- 2011: Chairman of the Committee on Governmental Affairs
- 2011: Member of the Welfare Committee
