= Henrik Old =

Faroese politician

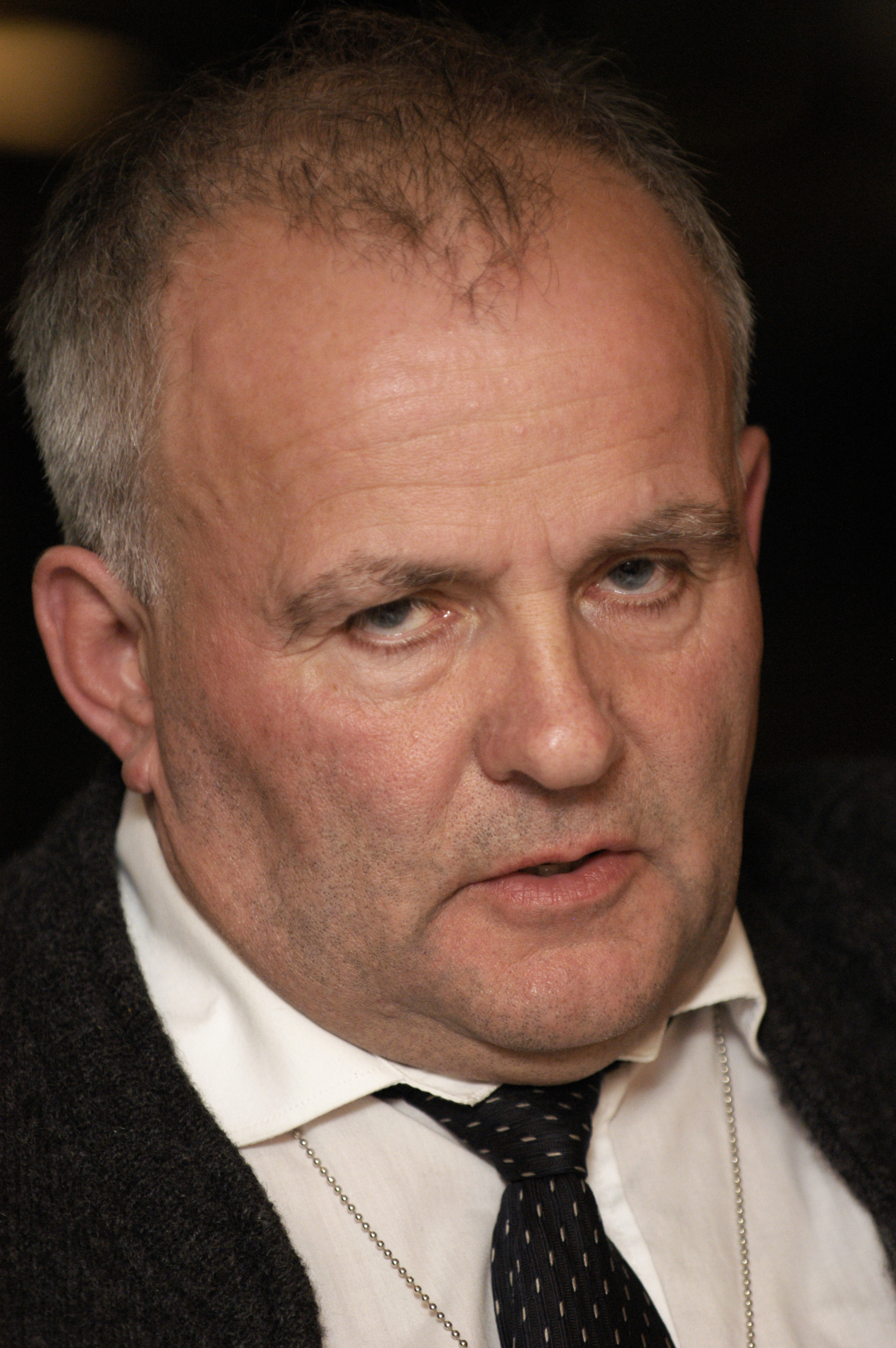

Minister of Transport, Infrastructure and Labor of the Faroe Islands
- Incumbent
- Assumed office 15 September 2015

Member of Løgting
- In office 1984–2008
- Incumbent
- Assumed office 2011

Personal details
- Born: 20 June 1947 (age 78) Vágur, Faroe Islands

Henrik James Frits Old (born 20 June 1947 in Vágur, Faroe Islands) is a Faroese politician. He is a current (2011–2015) member of the Faroese parliament. He was elected for the Løgting for the first time in 1984. He was re-elected several times and represented the island of Suðuroy. He was elected for the Social Democratic Party (Faroe Islands). He was an MP from 1984 to 2008 and again from 2011.

== Political career ==
=== Member of the Faroese Parliament ===
- 1984 - 2008 - Member of the Løgting representing the Social Democratic Party
- 2011–present - Member of the Løgting representing the Social Democratic Party

=== Chair of Standing Committees of the Løgting ===
- 1991 - 1992 Chair of the Standing Committee on Business
- 1994 - 1995 Chair of the Standing Committee on Fisheries
- 1995 - ? Chair of the Standing Committee on Business

=== President or member of other committees ===
- 2012 - Member of the West Nordic Council
- 2010 - 2011 President of the West Nordic Council
- 2005 - 2006 President of the West Nordic Council
- 1987 - 1995 President of the Lønjavningargrunnur Skipsfiskimanna

== Family ==
Henrik Old is married to Elsebeth Old (born í Gong, daughter of Petur í Gong who was a member of the City Council of Tórshavn from 1957 - 1996), together they have four children. His parents were Henrikka and Dennis William Connor Old, his father was British. His mother died at a young age, and after that he was raised by his fosterparents Inger and Johannes Joensen.
