= Poul Michelsen =

Faroese businessman and former politician

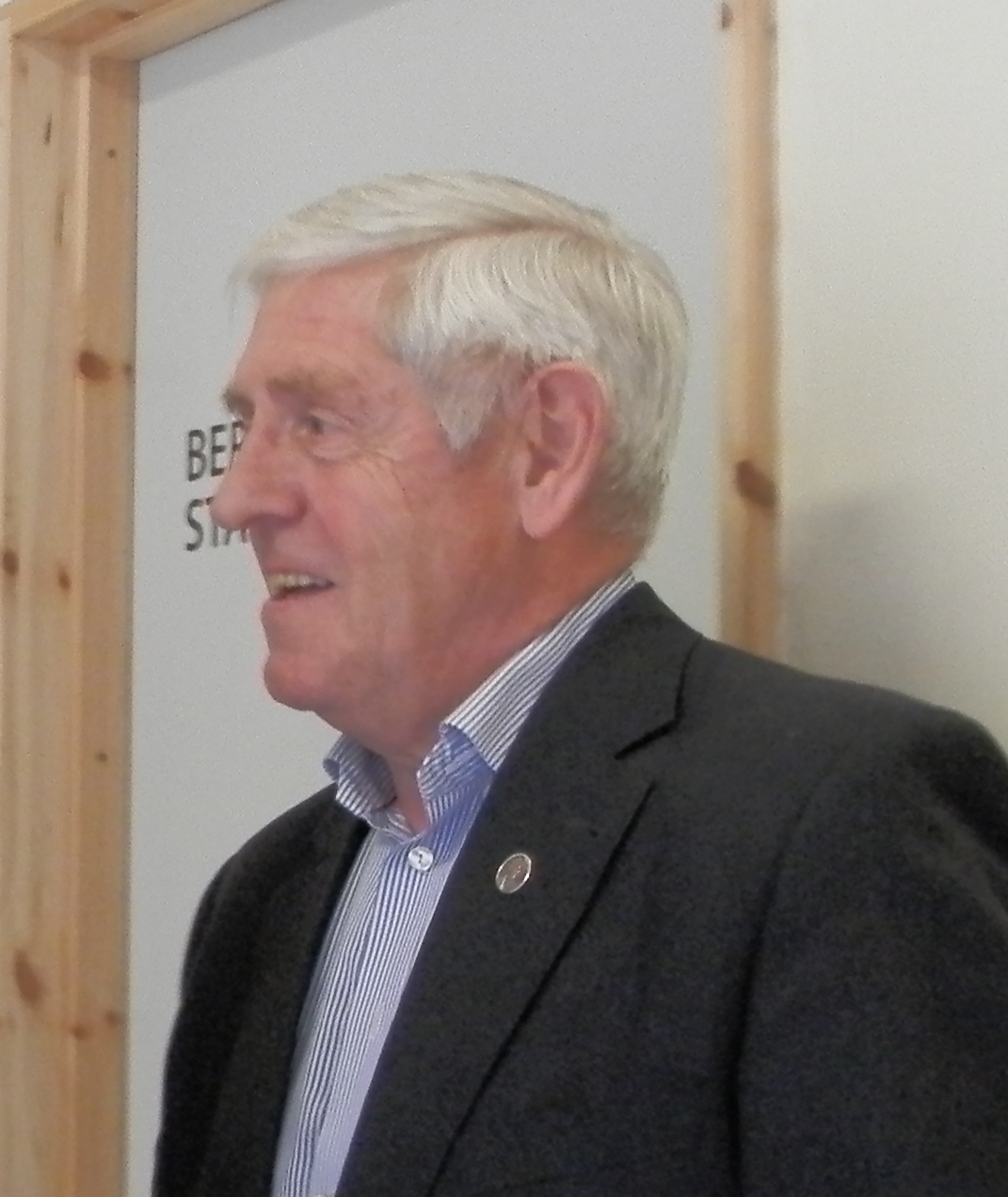

Member of Parliament
- In office 30 April 2002 – March 2020
- Constituency: Suðurstreymoy

Minister of Trade and Foreign Affairs
- In office 15 September 2015 – September 2019
- Prime Minister: Aksel V. Johannesen
- Preceded by: Johan Dahl
- Succeeded by: Jenis av Rana (Foreign Affairs) / Helgi Abrahamsen (Trade)

Member of Parliament
- In office 1984–1990

Mayor of Tórshavn
- In office 1981–1992
- Preceded by: Petur Christiansen
- Succeeded by: Lisbeth L. Petersen

Member of Parliament
- In office 2002–2020

Personal details
- Born: 22 July 1944 (age 81) Tórshavn, Faroe Islands
- Party: Progress (Framsókn)
- Spouse: Sólrún Michelsen (née Midjord)

Poul Johan Sundberg Michelsen (born 22 July 1944 in Tórshavn) is a Faroese business man and former politician. He was the leader of Progress (Framsókn), which he and others established in 2011. Before the establishment of Progress, he was a member of People's Party (Fólkaflokkurin). In March 2020 he chose to leave the Parliament and ending his political career after struggling with sequelae of a stroke for some months.

== Background ==
Michelsen grew up in Tórshavn and was active in sports. He was apprenticed as a commercial trainee at the Balslev company, which today is called Bygma-Balslev. Later, Kartni Winther and Torbjørn Sørensen bought the wholesale from Balslev and named it Kartni Winther. It was run by Kartni Winther, Torbjørn Sørensen and Poul Michelsen until Michelsen started his own wholesale business in 1974. Michelsen has been Finnish Consul General in the Faroe Islands since 2001. In November 2014 he was appointed the Commander of the Order of the Lion of Finland.

=== Family ===
His parents are Paula, born Sundberg, from Nes, Vágur in Suðuroy and Johan Michelsen from Tórshavn. He is married to the writer Sólrún Michelsen, they have three children. Poul also has a son named Victor Palsson who lives in Iceland and has a different birth mother.

=== The Poul Michelsen company ===
Michelsen established a grocery shop in the basement of his home in 1974. The shop was a success and in 1977 it was established as a joint-stock company (Faroese: Partafelag, short form P/F), named Poul Michelsen after him. In 2014 the company had 180 FTEs. In 1979 he opened the Poul Michelsen wholesales which now (2015) includes refrigeration, freezing and catering, the company PM-pluss, which has 80 employees, offers cleaning and catering. Poul Michelsen P/F owns the company Atlantic Flutningur, which has 14 vans and trucks from 3,5 tons up to 32 tons, whose primary goal is to deliver milk and other refrigerated or frozen goods as fresh as possible around the Faroe Islands.

== Sports career ==
Michelsen was the Faroese champion in badminton in the men's single from 1966 to 1975 and Faroese champion in the men's double in 1968 and 1970–1974 together with Joan P. Midjord.

Michelsen is also a former football player and has won the Faroese championship in football for HB Tórshavn in 1971 (he scored both goals in the title decisive game away to KÍ Klaksvík, which ended 2–1) and the Faroe Islands Cup for HB Tórshavn in 1964, 1969, 1971 and 1972.

He also won the Faroese championship in table tennis.

He has represented the Faroe Islands national teams in football, badminton and table tennis.

In November 2014 he was appointed honorary member of HB Tórshavn.

== Political career ==
Michelsen was elected mayor of Tórshavn in 1981. In 1984 he was elected member of the Løgting (the Faroese parliament) representing People's Party (Fólkaflokkurin). He remained MP until 1990 and mayor until 1992. He was elected for the parliament again in 2002 and remained a member until 2020.

Michelsen was a member of Fólkaflokkurin for around 40 years until 2010, when he left the party as a protest against the political course, which in his opinion was pointing in the opposite direction of the parties values. He was known as much more liberal regarding social and economic affairs, and radical in the matter of independence from Denmark than his fellow party before his exit. In an interview with the Faroese newspaper Sosialurin he criticized what he saw as the parties resistance to reform Michelsen even criticized named politicians in the People's Party, especially a group of politicians with close relations to Anfinn Kallsberg; which he considered as a prevention for reforms which a majority of the parti wanted to perform earlier.

On 9 March 2011 he formed together with Hanna Jensen a new political party named Framsókn (Progress), which he describes as a liberal national party. Michelsen is the leader of Progress and parliamentary leader. In 2011 the party had two members elected, Poul Michelsen and Janus Rein. Rein left the party one year later and joined Fólkaflokkurin in September 2013.

=== Member of parliamentary standing committees ===
- 2011–2015 member of the Culture Committee
- 2008–2011 member of the Justice Committee
- 2004–2008 member of the Justice Committee
- 2002–2004 member of the Justice Committee
- 1988–1990 member of the Trade Committee
- 1988–1990 member of the Justice Committee
- 1986–1988 member of the Finance Committee
- 1984–1986 member of the Environment Committee

== See also ==
- List of foreign ministers in 2017
- List of current foreign ministers
