= Bill Justinussen =

Kristian Bill Justinussen
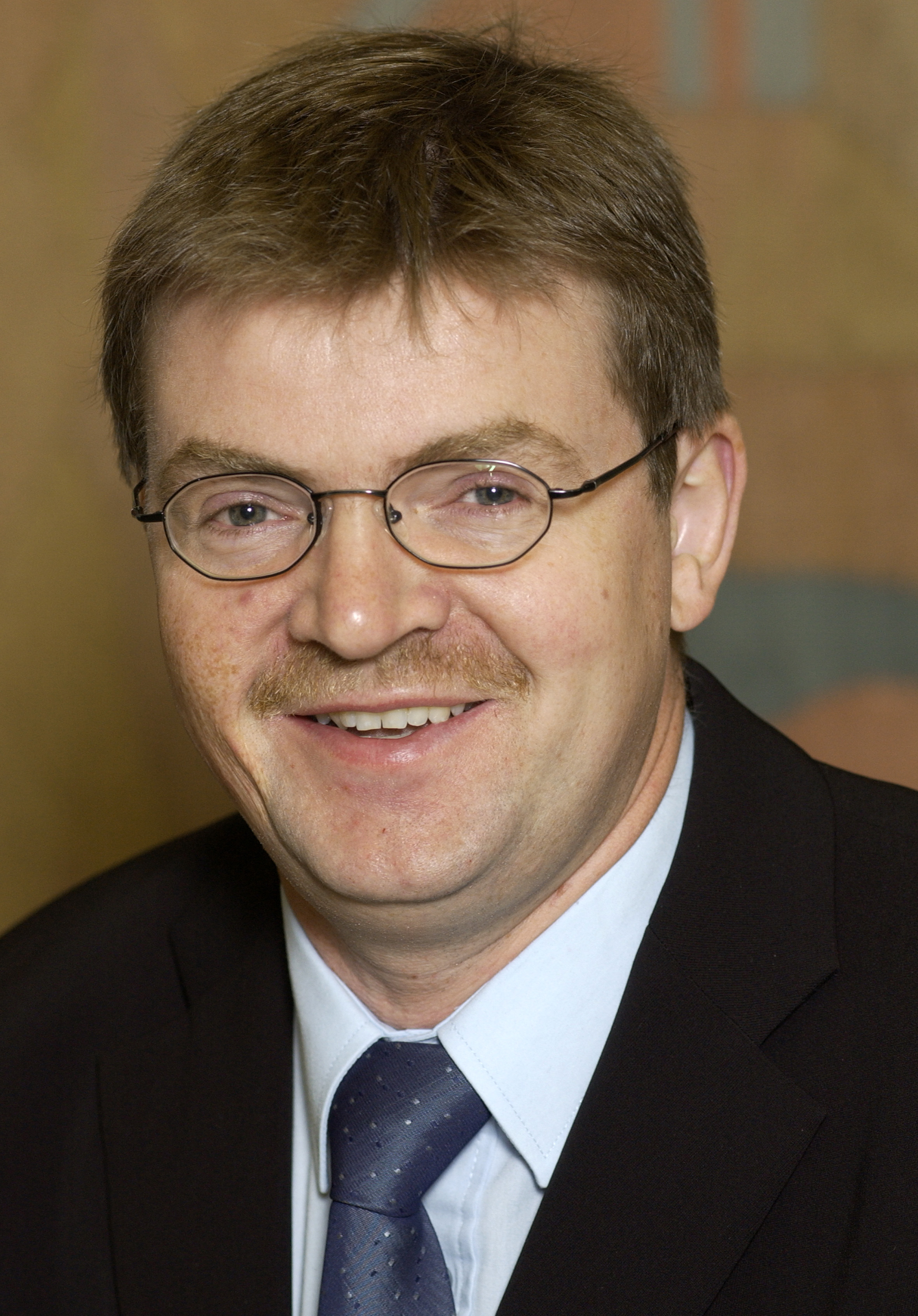

23rd President of the West Nordic Council
- In office 2014–2015
- Preceded by: Unnur Brá Konráðsdóttir
- Succeeded by: Lars-Emil Johansen

Health Minister of the Faroe Islands
- In office 2002–2004
- Preceded by: Sámal Petur í Grund
- Succeeded by: Hans Pauli Strøm

Member of Parliament
- Incumbent
- Assumed office 2003

Personal details
- Born: 29 August 1963 (age 61); Klaksvík, Faroe Islands
- Political party: Centre
- Spouse: Malena Justinussen

Bill Justinussen (born 1963) is a Faroese politician who served as Minister of Health from 2002 to 2004. He also was the President of the West Nordic Council from 2014 to 2015, and the chairman of the Centre Party from 1997 to 1999. He has also been a Member of the Løgting (the Faroese Parliament) since 2003.
