= Páll á Reynatúgvu =

Faroese politician and footballer

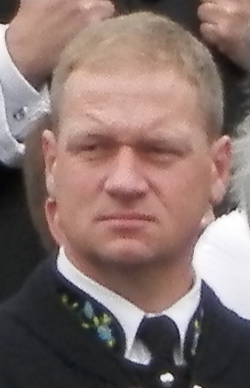
- Páll á Reynatúgvu in 2012.

Member of the Løgting
- Incumbent
- Assumed office 1998

Minister of Health and Social Affairs
- In office 2002–2004

Speaker of the Løgting
- In office 2015–2019

Personal details
- Born: 26 July 1967 (age 59) Tórshavn
- Party: Republic
Association football career
- Position: Midfielder
Senior career*
Years	Team	Apps	(Gls)
1987–2003	B71 Sandur	224	(55)
International career
1993	Faroe Islands	5	(0)
- * Club domestic league appearances and goals

Páll á Reynatúgvu (born 26 July 1967 in Tórshavn) is a Faroese politician, and former football player, currently serving as speaker of the Faroese Parliament. He was first elected in 1998, and again in 2002, when he assumed the position of Minister of Health and Social Affairs. After being re-elected in 2004, he became a member of the "Fíggjarnevndin" (Financial Committee of the Løgting).

At the 2008 parliamentary elections á Reynatúgvu was not re-elected, but sat in parliament when Anita á Fríðriksmørk took maternity leave, and as his party was a part of the Landsstýri, he was next on the list to get a seat in the parliament. Before Páll á Reynatúgvu was elected for the Løgting in 2011, he was president of the SEV, which provides the Faroe Islands with electricity. He had to quit this job, because the Faroese law does not allow a person to be a member of the Løgting and at the same time to be a member of a governmental owned institution or company.

== Football career ==
Páll á Reynatúgvu played for many years as a midfielder for his local football club, B71 Sandur. For a few seasons, he also served as the team's captain. With his club, he won the Faroese League in 1989 and Faroese Cup 1993.

In 1993 Páll á Reynatúgvu played 5 matches for the Faroe Islands national football team, four of which were 1994 FIFA World Cup qualifiers with one friendly match. In 1996/97 Páll á Reynatúgvu played two matches with B71 Sandur against APOEL Nicosia from Cyprus in the Champions League. Apoel Nicosia won both matches, but in the away match B71 took a 2-1 lead with goals from Eli Hentze and Páll á Reynatúgvu. APOEL F.C. won the match 4-2.
