= Jacob Vestergaard =

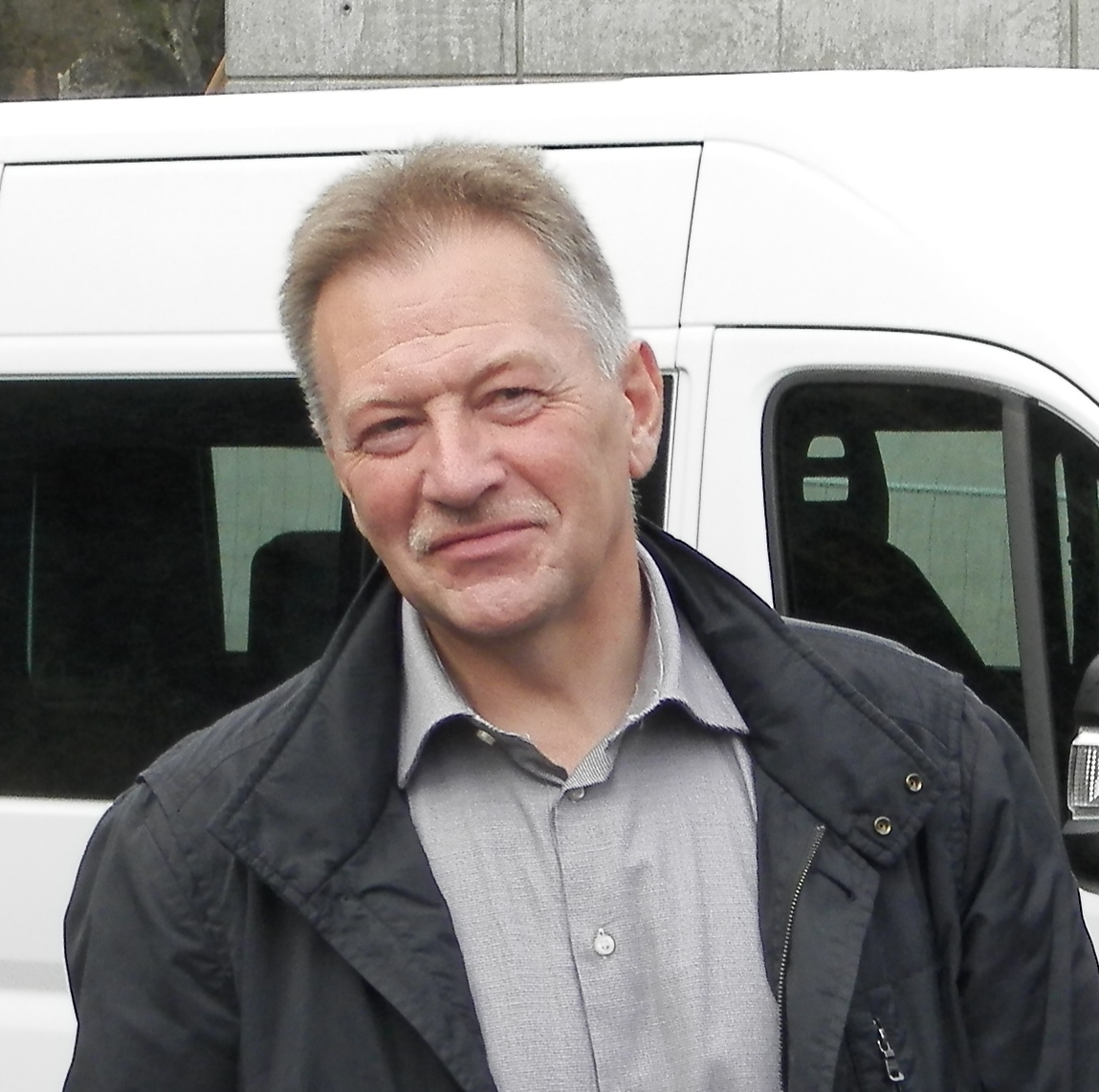

Minister of Fisheries
- In office 6 February 2012 – 15 September 2015
- Preceded by: Jákup Mikkelsen
- Succeeded by: Høgni Hoydal

Minister of Fisheries
- In office 26 September 2008 – 6 April 2011
- Preceded by: Torbjørn Jacobsen
- Succeeded by: Johan Dahl

Minister of Internal Affairs
- In office 1 December 2005 – 23 November 2007
- Preceded by: Jógvan við Keldu
- Succeeded by: Heðin Zachariasen

Minister of Fisheries
- In office 17 February 2003 – 3 February 2004
- Preceded by: Jørgen Niclasen
- Succeeded by: Johan Dahl

Member of Parliament
- Incumbent
- Assumed office 19 January 2008

Mayor of Sumba
- In office 1993–2004

Personal details
- Born: 7 April 1961 (age 65) Tvøroyri, Faroe Islands
- Party: People's Party (Fólkaflokkurin)
- Spouse: Sólfríð Vestergaard

Jacob Vestergaard (born 7 April 1961 in Tvøroyri, Faroe Islands, grew up in and lives in Akrar) is a Faroese politician. He has been Minister of Fisheries of the Faroe Islands three times, last time was from 2012 to 2015. Before he became a politician he worked as a policeman. He is married to Sólfríð Vestergaard, together they have four children.

== Political career ==
Vestergaard's political career started the 1990s in the Town Council of Sumba, where he was elected mayor from 1 January 1993 until February 2003 and again from 1 January 2004 until 31 December 2004. He was president of Føroya Kommunufelag from 2001 to 2003. He was elected for the Faroese parliament in January 2008 for the first time representing the People's Party (Fólkaflokkurin). He was elected with 870 votes and was number four of all elected members and number one of his party. In 2011 he was reelected with 1048 votes, which was second most votes of the candidates of the People's Party. Vestergaard was Minister of Internal Affairs from 1 December 2005 until 23 November 2007 and Minister of Fisheries three times, from 2003 to 2004 and 2008 to 2011 and again from 16 February 2012 until present.
