= Jógvan Durhuus =

Faroese politician (1938–2026)

Member of the Løgting
- In office 1994–2002
- In office 1984–1990
- In office 1970–1980

Personal details
- Born: Jógvan Anfinnur Olafsson Durhuus; 19 February 1938 Vestmanna, Faroe Islands, Denmark
- Died: 16 January 2026 (aged 87)
- Party: TF
- Occupation: Postal clerk

Jógvan Anfinnur Olafsson Durhuus (19 February 1938 – 16 January 2026) was a Faroese politician. A member of the Republican Party, he served in the Løgting from 1970 to 1980, from 1984 to 1990, and from 1994 to 2002.

Durhuus died on 16 January 2026, at the age of 87.
