= Kári P. Højgaard =

Faroese politician

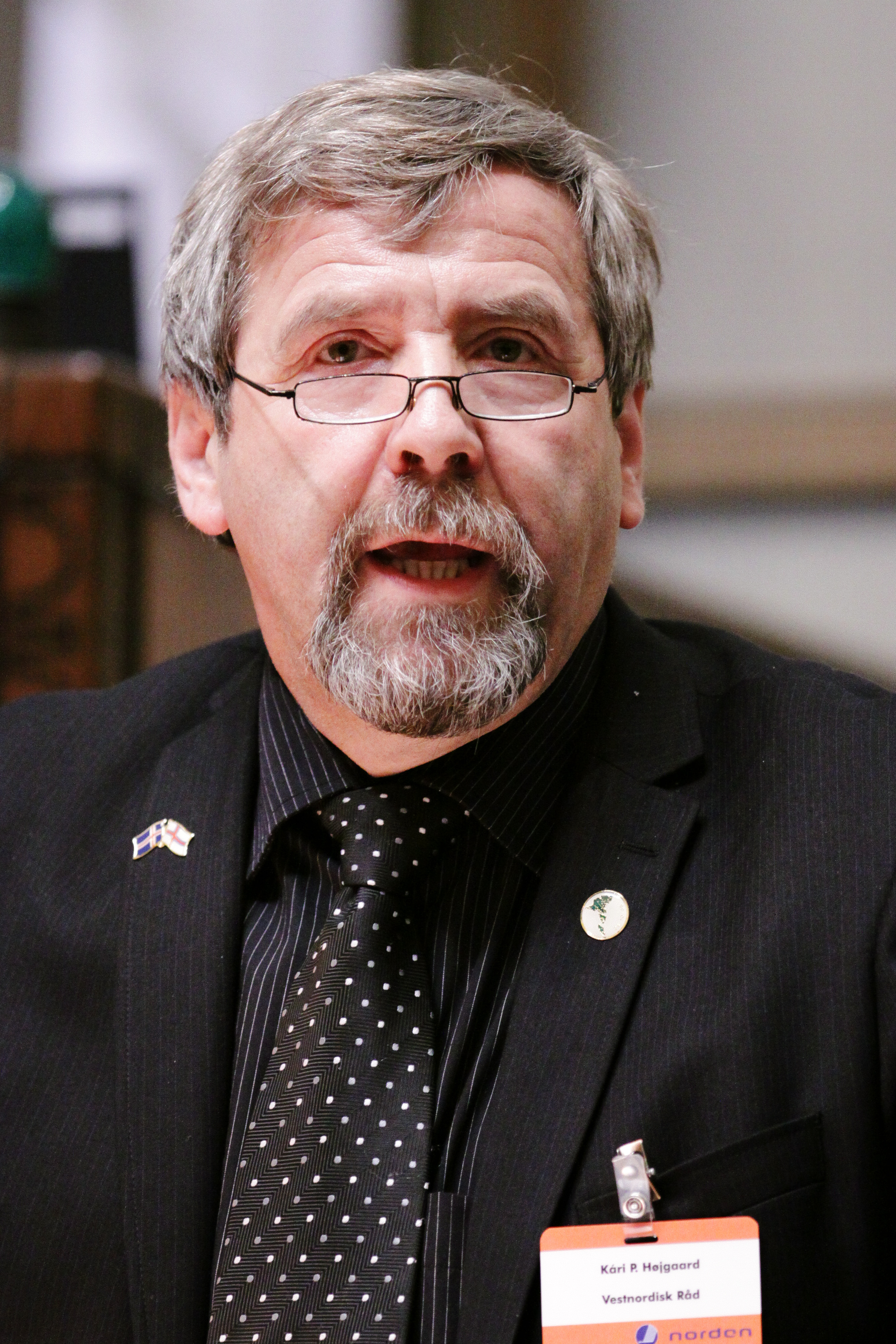
Kári P. Højgaard

Kári Páll Højgaard (born 21 July 1951 in Strendur, Faroe Islands) is a Faroese politician. He was chairman of the Self-Government Party (Sjálvstýrisflokkurin) until April 2015 and is a former president of the West Nordic Council (2008–09) (2011–2012) (2017–2018).

Højgaard was elected as member of the Faroese Parliament on 27 February 2001. He was leader of his party's parliamentary group 2001–11 as well as party chairman 2003–10 and again 2011–2015.

He has been member of the municipal council in Runavík from 1988 to the end of 2008, and is currently living in Saltangará.

Højgaard was member of The Environment and Natural Resources Committee of the Nordic Council in the period 2004–2008.

In November 2011 Højgaard became Minister of Internal Affairs, in the centre-right ABDH government. He was minister from 14 November 2011 until 5 September 2013 when prime minister sacked him because of the case of the Eysturoy tunnel, which was planned to be made by a private Danish company, Copenhagen Infrastructure Partners. The plan with the private company was skipped, instead the plan is that the tunnel shall be made by and owned by the government.
