= Jenis av Rana =

Faroese medical practitioner and politician

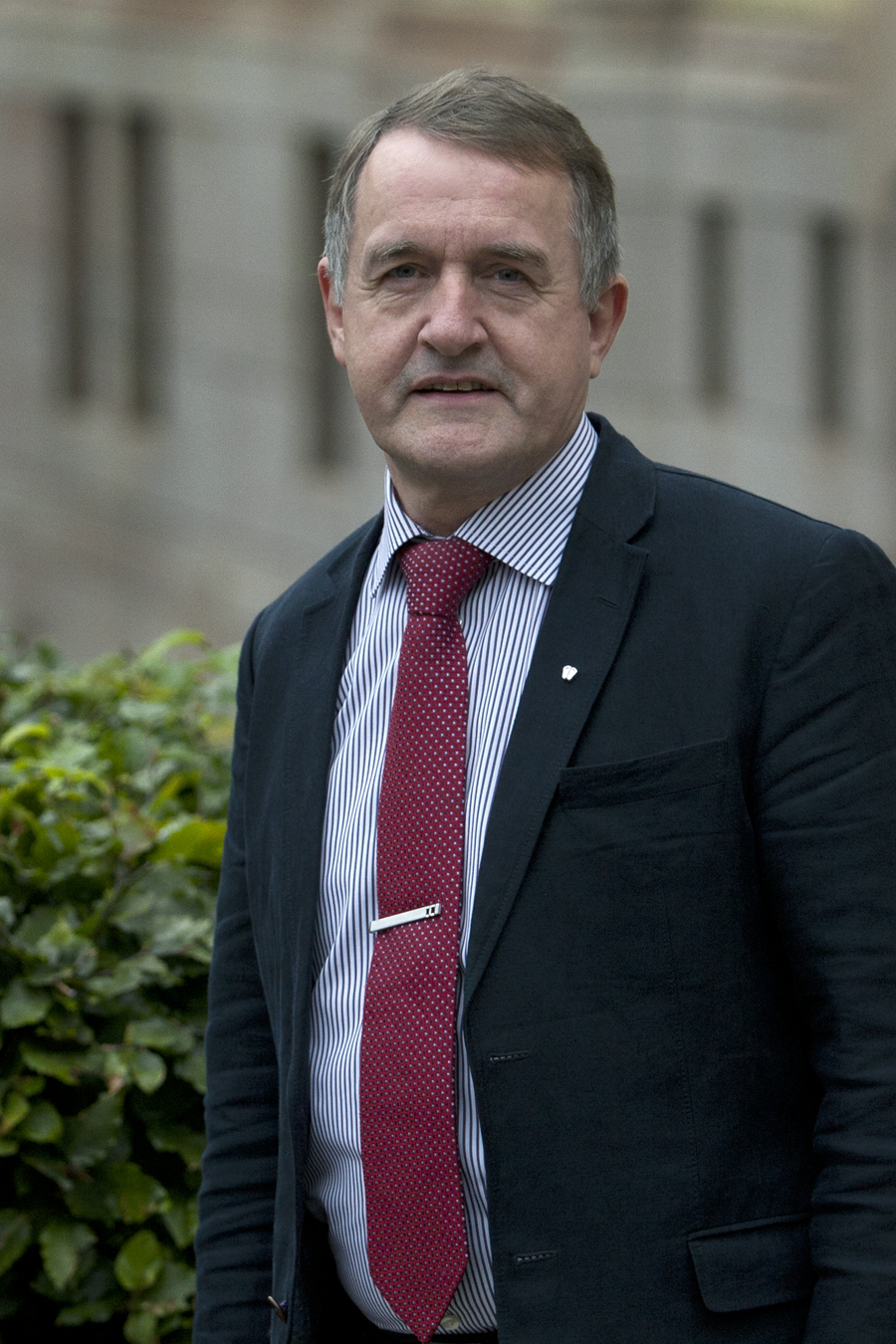
- Jenis av Rana

Leader of Centre Party
- Incumbent
- Assumed office 2001
- Preceded by: Álvur Kirke

Minister of Foreign Affairs and Culture
- In office 16 September 2019 – 8 November 2022
- Prime Minister: Bárður á Steig Nielsen
- Preceded by: Poul Michelsen (Foreign Affairs) / Høgni Hoydal (Culture)
- Succeeded by: Høgni Hoydal (Foreign Affairs) / Sirið Stenberg (Culture)

Member of the Løgting
- Incumbent
- Assumed office 1994

Personal details
- Born: 7 January 1953 (age 73) Trongisvágur, Faroe Islands
- Party: Centre Party (Miðflokkurin)

Jenis Kristian av Rana (born 7 January 1953 in Trongisvágur) is a Faroese medical practitioner and politician, serving as leader of the Centre Party since 2001. He served as minister of Foreign Affairs and Culture of the Faroe Islands from 2019 until his party's withdrawal from government in November 2022.

Jenis av Rana has been elected to the Løgting (the Faroese parliament) since 1994 and has been parliamentary leader for his party since then. His strong social conservative beliefs, particularly towards LGBT rights, have made him a controversial figure in Faroese politics, especially when he refused a dinner invitation from the then-Icelandic prime minister Jóhanna Sigurðardóttir due to her sexuality.

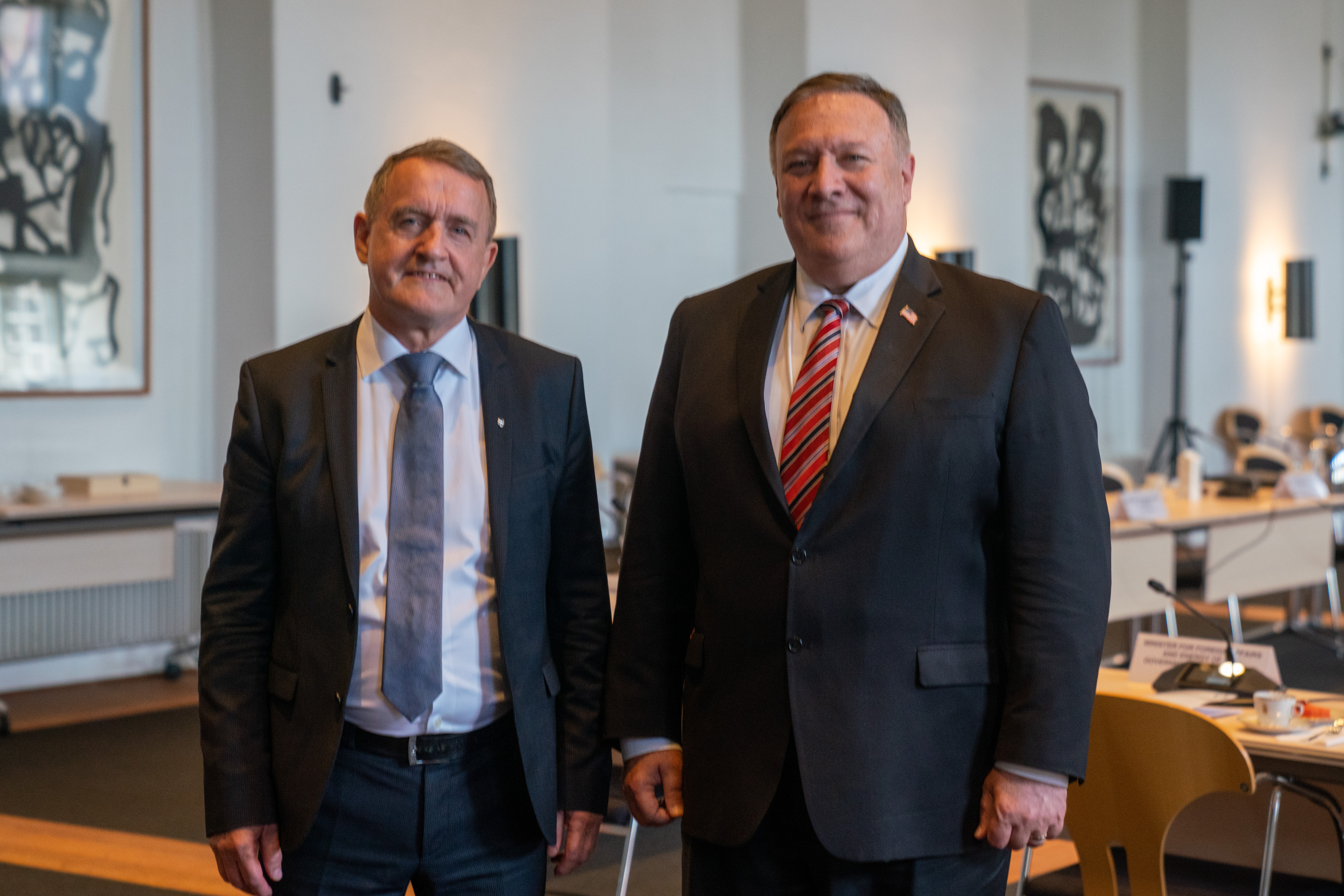
Av Rana meets with U.S. Secretary of State Michael R. Pompeo in Copenhagen, Denmark on 22 July 2020.

== Early life and career ==
Jenis av Rana is the son of Aslaug and Dánjal av Rana, former mayor of Tvøroyri. He is married and has three children. After finishing high school, he worked as a teacher in Tvøroyri and Froðba 1972–1974. He studied in Aarhus University and graduated in medicine in 1983. Jenis av Rana has been working as a medical practitioner in Tórshavn since 1995. He is a preacher and radio host and board member of the Christian radio station Lindin, which started to broadcast on 21 January 2001.

On 16 September 2019 he was appointed as minister of foreign affairs and culture of the Faroe Islands in the government of Bárður á Steig Nielsen.

On 8 November 2022 he was dismissed from his position as minister of foreign affairs and culture after stating that he could not support Conservative People's Party leader Søren Pape Poulsen, who is openly gay, as Prime Minister of Denmark due to his sexuality. Av Rana subsequently pulled Centre's support of á Steig Nielsen's government, triggering a snap election.
