= Centre Party (Faroe Islands) =

Faroese political party

Centre Party Miðflokkurin
- Leader: Steffan Klein Poulsen
- Founded: 30 May 1992
- Split from: Christian People's Party
- Youth wing: Ung fyri Miðflokkin
- Ideology: Christian democracy; Social conservatism; Christian right; Anti-LGBT; Regionalism
- Political position: Right-wing
- Nordic affiliation: Centre Group
- Colours: Blue
- Løgting: 2 / 33
- Folketing (Faroe seats): 0 / 2

Election symbol
- H

Website
- midflokkurin.fo

The Centre Party (Faroese: Miðflokkurin) is a Christian democratic, conservative political party on the Faroe Islands, led by Steffan Klein Poulsen. The party is known for its social conservatism, particularly its stances against LGBT rights.

== Leaders ==
Party leaders

- Steffan Klein Poulsen 2026–present
- Jenis av Rana 2001–2026
- Álvur Kirke 1999–2001
- Bill Justinussen 1997–1999
- Jenis av Rana 1994–1997
- Álvur Kirke 1992–1994

Parliamentary leaders

- Jenis av Rana 1998–present
- Tordur Niclasen 1992–1998

== Current members of the Løgting ==
As of the 2026 general election:

Name	Elected (E), Re-elected (R), or Appointed (A)	Votes obtained in the general election	Title
Steffan Klein Poulsen	R	701	Member of the Løgting
Jenis av Rana	R	364	Member of the Løgting

== Election results ==
Faroese general election

Year	Votes		Seats		Position
Year	#	%	#	±	Position
1994	1,491	5.8	2 / 32	New	▲7th
1998	1,125	4.1	1 / 32	▼1	▲6th
2002	1,292	4.2	1 / 32	0	6th
2004	1,661	5.2	2 / 32	▲1	▲5th
2008	2,610	8.4	3 / 33	▲1	5th
2011	1,883	6.2	2 / 33	▼1	▼6th
2015	1,779	5.5	2 / 33	0	6th
2019	1,815	5.4	2 / 33	0	▲5th
2022	2,242	6.6	2 / 33	0	▼6th
2026	1,866	5.3	2 / 33	0	6th

Danish general election

Year	Votes		Members
Year	#	%	Members
2001	569	2.2	0 / 2
2005	829	3.3	0 / 2
2007	1,573	6.8	0 / 2
2011	875	4.2	0 / 2
2015	605	2.6	0 / 2
2019	Did not contest		
2022	1,217	4.5	0 / 2
2026	437	1.5	0 / 2
