= List of members of the Løgting, 2015–2019 =

List of the members of the Faroese Løgting in the period 2015–2019, they were elected at the general election on 1 September 2015. The parliament has 33 members this period. Two persons left their parties a few days after the election. Sonja Jógvansdóttir left the Social Democratic Party on 15 September 2015. According to her it was because she couldn't live with the fact that her own party was the one who blocked the possibility of mentioning the possibility of Civil marriage between same-sex couples in the coalition-agreement between the three government parties. Jógvansdóttir was the first Faroese person who is openly homosexual, who has been elected to the Løgting. The second person who left her party was Annika Olsen, who left People's Party on 9 September 2015 because of disagreements and joined Progress on 17 September 2015 and became chairperson of the Standing Committee of Finance of the Løgting.

The government during this legislature was the first cabinet of Aksel V. Johannesen; a coalition of the Social Democratic Party, Republic and Progress, supported by Jógvansdóttir.

Name	Party	From area	Comments
Aksel V. Johannesen	Social Democratic Party	Norðoyar	Prime Minister since 15 September 2015. Substituted by Helena Dam á Neystabø.
Annika Olsen	People's Party	Suðurstreymoy	Left Peoples Party 8 days after the election, joined Progress on 17 September 2015. Left Progress three days later on 20 September 2015 and took leave from the Løgting until the end of October 2015. Joen Magnus Rasmussen replaced her.
Annita á Fríðriksmørk	Republic	Suðurstreymoy	
Bill Justinussen	Centre Party	Eysturoy	
Bjarni Hammer	Social Democratic Party	Suðuroy	
Bjørn Kalsø	Union Party	Norðoyar	
Bárður á Steig Nielsen	Union Party	Norðurstreymoy	
Edmund Joensen	Union Party	Eysturoy	
Elsebeth Mercedis Gunnleygsdóttur	People's Party	Norðoyar	
Eyðgun Samuelsen	Social Democratic Party	Norðoyar	Minister since 15 September 2015. Substituted by Jónleif Johannesen
Hanna Jensen	Progress	Suðurstreymoy	
Heðin Mortensen	Social Democratic Party	Suðurstreymoy	
Henrik Old	Social Democratic Party	Suðuroy	Minister of Internal Affairs since 15 September 2015. Substituted by Djóni Nolsøe Joensen
Høgni Hoydal	Republic	Suðurstreymoy	Minister of Fisheries since 15 September 2015. Substituted by Bjørt Samuelsen
Jacob Vestergaard	People's Party	Suðuroy	
Jákup Mikkelsen	People's Party	Norðoyar	
Jenis av Rana	Centre Party	Suðurstreymoy	
Jógvan á Lakjuni	People's Party	Eysturoy	
Jógvan Skorheim	Self-Government Party	Norðoyar	Skorheim decided to stay on as Mayor of Klaksvík, he was substituted by Bárður Kass Nielsen.
Jørgen Niclasen	People's Party	Vágar	
Kaj Leo Holm Johannesen	Union Party	Suðurstreymoy	
Katrin Kallsberg	Republic	Suðurstreymoy	
Kristin Michelsen	Social Democratic Party	Suðuroy	
Kristina Háfoss	Republic	Suðurstreymoy	Minister of Finance since 15 September 2015. Substituted by Pauli Trond Petersen
Kári P. Højgaard	Self-Government Party	Eysturoy	
Magni Laksáfoss	Union Party	Suðurstreymoy	
Magni Arge	Republic	Suðurstreymoy	Member of the Folketing (Hoydal was elected), substituted in the Løgting by Ingolf S. Olsen from 21 September 2015.
Magnus Rasmussen	Union Party	Eysturoy	
Poul Michelsen	Progress	Suðurstreymoy	Minister of Foreign Affairs and Trade since 15 September 2015. Substituted by Ruth Vang
Páll á Reynatúgvu	Republic	Sandoy	Speaker of the Løgting
Rigmor Dam	Social Democratic Party	Suðurstreymoy	Minister of Culture since 15 September 2015. Should have been substituted by Sjúrður Skaale who was next on the list, but he took leave from the Løgting because he is in the Folketing also and his party policy is now to be in one seat at the time. Instead Kristianna Winther Poulsen took seat in the Løgting.
Sirið Stenberg	Republic	Suðuroy	Minister of Health since 15 September 2015. Substituted by Óluva Klettskarð.
Sonja Jógvansdóttir	Social Democratic Party	Suðurstreymoy	Left the Social Democratic Party on 15 September and became Independent.
