= Same-sex marriage in the Faroe Islands =

Same-sex marriage has been legal in the Faroe Islands since 1 July 2017. Legislation allowing same-sex marriage and adoption by same-sex couples was introduced to the Løgting by members of the Social Democratic, Republic and Progress parties following the September 2015 elections. It was approved 19–14 by the Løgting on 29 April 2016, and 108–0 by the Folketing on 25 April 2017. The law received royal assent on 3 May and went into effect on 1 July 2017.

The Faroe Islands, an autonomous territory within the Kingdom of Denmark, was the last Nordic region to allow same-sex marriage.

== Registered partnerships ==
Unlike Denmark and Greenland, the Faroe Islands never adopted registered partnerships (Faroese: skrásett parlag, pronounced [ˈskɹɔaːsɛtː ˈpʰaɻɭɛaː]; Danish: registreret partnerskab, pronounced [ʁekiˈstʁeˀð̩ ˈpʰɑːtnɐˌskɛˀp]) which would have offered same-sex couples some of the rights, benefits and responsibilities of marriage.

In 1989, Denmark became the first country in the world to enact registered partnerships. However, the law did not apply to the Faroe Islands. In 2011, the Danish Ministry of Justice stated that it could not determine whether partnerships performed in Denmark or Greenland would be legally recognized in the Faroe Islands, noting that the issue was "ultimately a matter for the courts".

== Same-sex marriage ==
Laws regarding same-sex partnerships in Europe¹ Marriage Civil union Limited domestic recognition (cohabitation) Unrecognized Constitution limits marriage to opposite-sex couples ¹ May include recent laws or court decisions that have not yet entered into effect.

=== Failed attempts in 2013–2014 ===
Same-sex marriage legislation first appeared in the Løgting after the Tórshavn gay pride parade in 2012. A set of bills to extend Denmark's same-sex marriage law to the Faroe Islands was submitted to the Løgting on 20 November 2013. If approved, they would have entered into force on 1 April 2014. Opposition to the bills from parties in the governing coalition crippled their progress, and the bills were rejected at the second reading on 13 March 2014, despite strong public support. Same-sex marriage became a significant issue in the September 2015 elections.

=== Introduction of legislation in 2016 ===
Following the September 2015 election, MPs Sonja Jógvansdóttir, Bjørt Samuelsen, Kristianna Winther Poulsen and Hanna Jensen submitted a same-sex marriage bill to the Parliament Secretariat. The proposal, along with a bill permitting same-sex divorce, entered the Løgting on 17 November 2015. If approved, the law would be scheduled to go into effect on 1 July 2016. A first reading took place on 24 November 2015. Though a majority of the committee scrutinising the bill were in favour of same-sex marriage, the second reading was postponed to the third week of March 2016. On 14 March 2016, the Welfare Committee presented their recommendation to the Løgting. Despite divisions, a majority of committee members, including Katrin Kallsberg, Sonja Jógvansdóttir, Óluva Klettskarð and Djóni N. Joensen, recommended that the Parliament pass the bill. The minority members of the committee, Kaj Leo Johannesen, Jenis av Rana and Jógvan á Lakjuni, recommended that the bill be rejected.

The second reading was held on 16 March 2016. There was no majority in favor of the proposal, as two members of the governing coalition, Kristin Michelsen and Heðin Mortensen of the Social Democratic Party, stated they would not support it at that stage and suggested that the bill be sent back to the Welfare Committee for amendments. They, along with several other members of the Løgting, expressed concerns that the legislation would mandate a right to same-sex marriage in the Church of the Faroe Islands. Following a short break, the Løgting voted to return the bill to the committee by a vote of 26–2 with 5 abstentions. During the debate, several conservative members who had previously voiced opposition to same-sex partnerships stated they would now support legalizing registered partnerships for same-sex couples. Some members of the Løgting raised concerns about section 14.2 of the Danish Marriage Act (Faroese: Hjúnabandslóg, pronounced [ˈtʃʰʉuːnapantsˌlɔuːw]; Danish: Ægteskabsloven, pronounced [ˈektəskɛpsˌlɒwˀn̩]) which stated that couples who had entered into a civil marriage could have their marriage blessed by the state church. In response to these concerns, the Welfare Committee proposed an amendment stipulating that the new marriage law in the Faroe Islands would not be implemented by the Løgting until section 14.2 had been either deleted or rephrased.

=== Passage in the Løgting in 2016 ===
The bill returned to the Løgting in its amended form for a second reading on 26 April 2016. Debate began at 11 a.m. and continued well past midnight on 27 April. During the debate, Mortensen introduced a proposal to hold a referendum on the issue, which precipitated a crisis within the coalition government. During a 90-minute recess, Mortensen held high-level talks with Prime Minister Aksel V. Johannesen and other members of the Løgting. He eventually withdrew his proposal, telling Kringvarp Føroya that he would not risk dividing, or even possibly dissolving, the coalition government. A few minutes later, a vote was held on the second reading, resulting in 19 votes in favour and 14 against. Every Government MP, Independent MP Sonja Jógvansdóttir and two Opposition MPs (Magni Laksáfoss and Edmund Joensen of the Union Party) voted in favour. The bill was approved in its third and final reading on 29 April, again by a 19–14 vote. At that point, a separate vote was held on a proposal to hold a referendum, but it was defeated in a 16–17 vote.

29 April 2016 vote in the Løgting
Party	Voted for	Voted against	Abstained
G Social Democratic Party	7: Helena Dam á Neystabø; Bjarni Hammer; Djóni Nolsøe Joensen; Jónleif Johannesen; Heðin Mortensen; Kristin Michelsen; Kristianna Winther Poulsen	–	–
G Republic	7: Annita á Fríðriksmørk; Páll á Reynatúgvu; Pauli Trond Háfoss; Katrin Kallsberg; Óluva Klettskarð; Ingolf Sólheim Olsen; Bjørt Samuelsen	–	–
People's Party	–	6: Jógvan á Lakjuni; Elsebeth Mercedis Gunnleygsdóttur; Jákup Mikkelsen; Jørgen Niclasen; Annika Olsen; Jacob Vestergaard	–
Union Party	2: Edmund Joensen; Magni Laksáfoss	4: Kaj Leo Holm Johannesen; Bjørn Kalsø; Bárður Nielsen; Magnus Rasmussen	–
G Progress	2: Hanna Jensen; Ruth Vang	–	–
Centre Party	–	2: Jenis av Rana; Bill Justinussen	–
Self-Government Party	–	2: Kári P. Højgaard; Bárður Kass Nielsen	–
Independent	1: Sonja Jógvansdóttir	–	–
Total	19	14	0
Total	57.6%	42.4%	0.0%

Article 1 of the Marriage Act was amended to read as follows:

- in Danish: Loven finder anvendelse på ægteskab mellem to personer af forskelligt køn og mellem to personer af samme køn.
- in Faroese: Lógin er galdandi fyri hjúnalag millum tvey persónar av ymiskum kyni og millum tvey persónar av sama kyni.

(The law applies to marriages between two persons of different sex and between two persons of the same sex.)

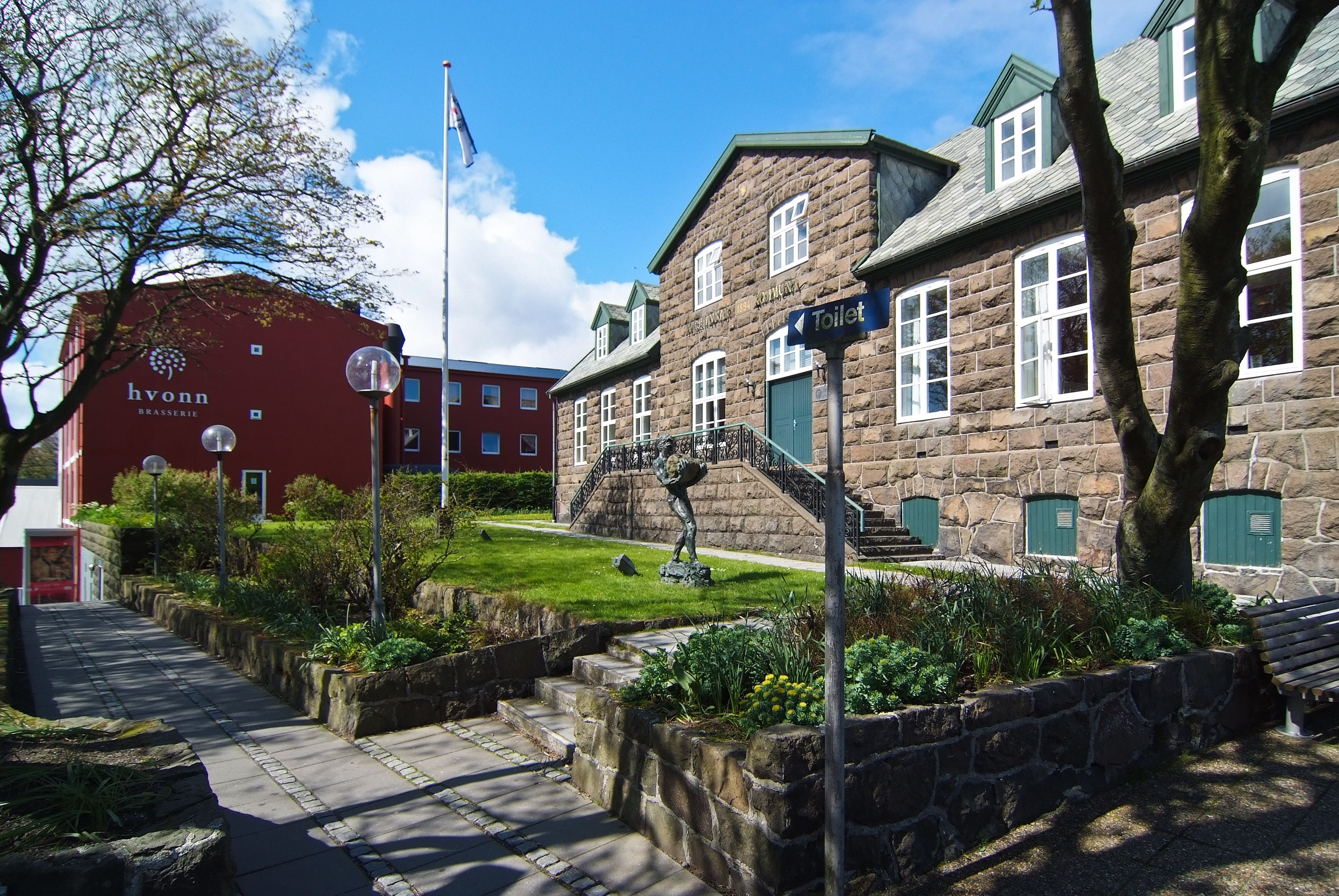
Tórshavn City Hall, where the first same-sex marriage in the Faroe Islands was performed on 6 September 2017.

The Faroese bill required amendments to Danish marriage law to be enacted by the Danish Parliament. A bill to this effect was introduced to the Danish Parliament on 8 February 2017, and had its first reading on 28 February. The relevant parliamentary committee approved the bill on 4 April, and the second reading was held on 20 April. The bill passed its third and final reading on 25 April by a vote of 108–0 with 71 abstentions. It received royal assent by Queen Margrethe II on 3 May. On 30 May 2017, the Løgting passed legislation exempting the Church of the Faroe Islands from the obligation to bless same-sex marriages by a vote of 18–14 with no abstentions. Subsequently, a Danish royal decree, formally required for the law's entry into force, was issued on 12 June 2017 and published on 16 June. Same-sex marriages have been available since 1 July 2017, the date the law came into effect.

The first same-sex wedding in the Faroe Islands was performed on 6 September 2017 at Tórshavn City Hall between British couple Leslie Travers and Richard McBride.

=== Subsequent changes ===
In December 2021, the Løgting passed two bills by an 18–13 vote guaranteeing equal parentage rights to married same-sex couples, including on matters relating to parental leave. Prime Minister Bárður á Steig Nielsen supported the bills, stating that "all parents should have the right to financial support". The laws went into effect on 1 January 2022.

=== Religious performance ===
Opposition from several members of the Løgting resulted in the Church of the Faroe Islands, the state church, being exempt from blessing or officiating at same-sex marriage ceremonies.

== Public opinion ==
A May 2013 Gallup survey found that 68% of Faroese people supported same-sex marriage, 27% were against and 5% were undecided. Another poll conducted in May 2014 found that regional divisions significantly influenced attitudes towards same-sex marriage, despite overall results being consistent with previous surveys: 62% support, 28% opposition and 10% undecided. Support was lowest in Norðoyar and Eysturoy, at 42% and 48% respectively, and highest in Suðurstreymoy—which contains the capital Tórshavn—at 76%. According to a poll conducted in August 2014, 61% of respondents supported same-sex marriage, 32% were opposed and the remainder were undecided.

A poll conducted by Gallup Føroyar in April 2016—commissioned Kringvarp Føroya and Miðlahúsið—showed that 64% of respondents supported legalizing same-sex marriage. Support varied by age, with 79% of 18–24-year-olds in favour, compared to just 53% of those aged 60 and above. The capital area, Suðurstreymoy, showed the highest level of support at 79%, while opposition was strongest in Norðoyar and Eysturoy, at 45% and 42% respectively. A majority of voters from most political parties supported same-sex marriage: 89% of Progress voters, 83% of Republic voters, 75% of Social Democratic voters and 62% of Self-Government Party voters. Half of Union Party and People's Party voters also expressed support. Centre Party voters were the only notable exception, with just 16% in favour and 84% opposed.

A poll conducted in September 2019 found that 71% of Faroese people were against repealing the same-sex marriage law, 16% were in favour and 13% were undecided. Support for same-sex marriage varied significantly by political party: Republic voters (96% support and 3% opposition), Social Democrats (91% support and 3% opposition), Progress voters (77% support and 19% opposition), Union Party voters (67% support and 17% opposition), People's Party voters (46% support and 32% opposition), Self-Government voters (38% support and 36% opposition), and Centre Party voters (27% support and 52% opposition).

== See also ==
- LGBT rights in the Faroe Islands
- Same-sex marriage in Denmark
- Recognition of same-sex unions in Europe
