= Cabinet of Jóannes Eidesgaard II =

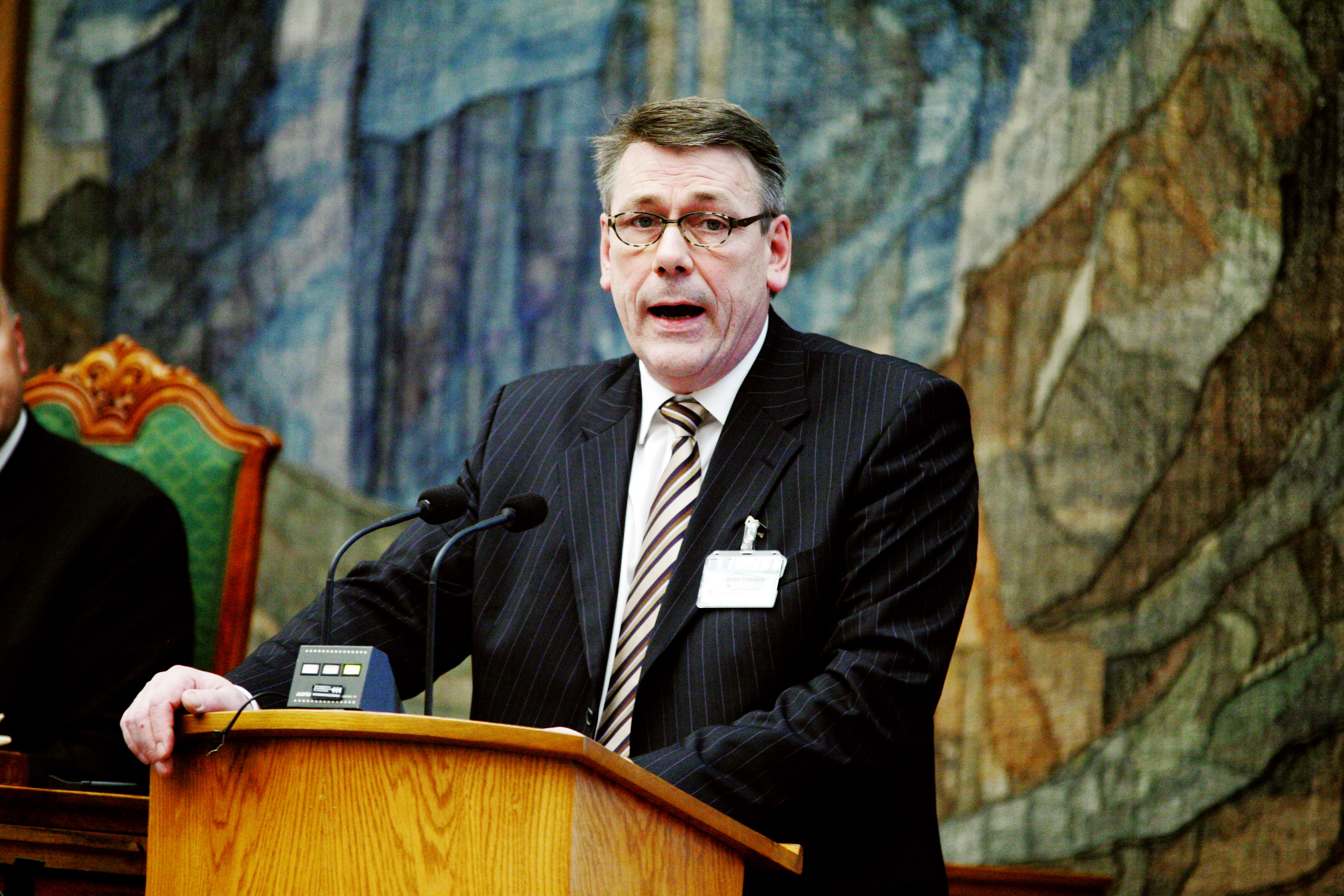
Jóannes Eidesgaard speaking in the Nordic Council

The second cabinet of Jóannes Eidesgaard was the government of the Faroe Islands from 4 February until 26 September 2008. It was a coalition between Social Democratic Party (SDP) (with Jóannes Eidesgaard as Prime Minister), Republic (R), Centre Party (CP).

There were internal disagreements after a few months, especially about some offices in Tinganes (later referred to as Lásagølan which means The lock scandal, something about changing of the lock of an office in the governmental administration), which resulted in Republic leaving the coalition on 15 September 2008, which created a government crisis. This made space for Kaj Leo Johannesen's First Cabinet on 26 September.

	Minister	Party	From	Until
Prime Minister	Jóannes Eidesgaard	JF	4 February 2008	26 September 2008
Deputy Prime Minister	Høgni Hoydal	T	4 February 2008	15 September 2008
Ministry	Minister	Party	From	Until
Foreign Ministry	Høgni Hoydal	T	4 February 2008	15 September 2008
Ministry of Social Affairs and Health	Hans Pauli Strøm	JF	4 February 2008	26 September 2008
Ministry of Internal Affairs	Helena Dam á Neystabø	JF	4 February 2008	26 September 2008
Ministry of Fisheries and Resources	Tórbjørn Jacobsen	T	4 February 2008	15 September 2008
Ministry of Culture	Óluva Klettskarð	T	30 August 2008	15 September 2008
	Kristina Háfoss	T	4 February 2008	30 August 2008
Ministry of Trade and Industry	Bjørt Samuelsen	T	4 February 2008	15 September 2008
Ministry of Finance	Karsten Hansen	MF	4 February 2008	26 September 2008

== See also ==
- Cabinet of the Faroe Islands
