= Klettskarð =

Klettskarð is a Faroese surname. Notable people with the surname include:

- Óluva Klettskarð (born 1965), Faroese politician
- Páll Klettskarð (born 1990), Faroese footballer
