= Ruth Vang =

Faroese politician

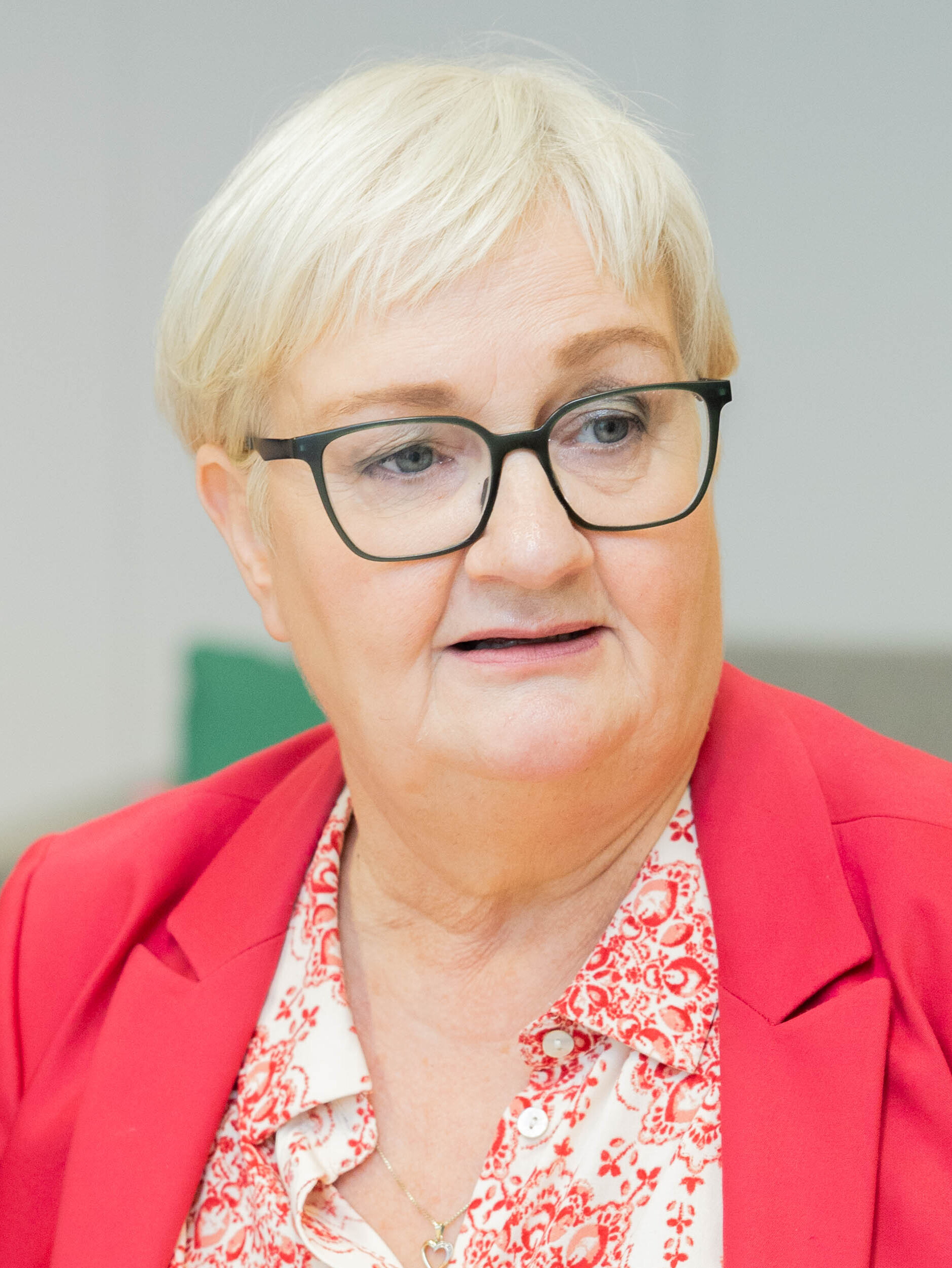
- Vang in 2025

Minister of Finance
- In office 2022–2026

Member of the Faroese Parliament
- In office 2015–2019

Personal details
- Born: 5 April 1966 (age 60)
- Party: Progress
- Education: Aarhus University School of Business and Social Sciences

Ruth Vang (born 5 April 1966) is a Faroese politician (FS). She is also a midwife and banker.

== Biography ==
Vang lives in Tórshavn. She graduated as a midwife at the Danish School of Midwifery in Copenhagen in 1992 and worked as a midwife at the National Hospital (Landssjúkrahúsið) in Tórshavn from 1992 to 1999, and then as a senior midwife from 1999 to 2005. She also studied accounting and financial management at Aarhus University School of Business and Social Sciences from 2001 to 2005 and made a career change to the financial sector. From 2005 to 2011 she was a credit advisor at Eik Bank. Since 1 January 2013 she has been employed as a department manager at Tórshavn Municipality.

== Political career ==
Vang ran for the 2015 Faroese general election without being elected, but subsequently entered parliament as a substitute for Framsókn chairman Poul Michelsen, when the latter was appointed Minister of Trade and Industry and Foreign Affairs in Aksel V. Johannesen's government.

Ruth Vang is leading her party into the 2026 Faroese general election.

=== Parliamentary committee ===
- 2015 - Chairman of the Finance Committee of the Parliament

== Personal life ==
She is the daughter of Ester and Petur Danielsen and is married to Dánjal Vang. They have three children: Ester, Petur Kristinn and Hanna.

== See also ==
- List of members of the Løgting, 2015–2019
- List of members of the Løgting, 2022–current
