= Annlis Bjarkhamar =

Faroese politician

Minister of Culture
- In office 6 June 2002 – 4 March 2003
- Preceded by: Óli Holm
- Succeeded by: Annita á Fríðriksmørk

Personal details
- Born: 20 January 1974 (age 52) Vágur, Faroe Islands
- Party: Republic (Tjóðveldi)

Annlis Bjarkhamar (born 20 January 1974) is a Faroese schoolteacher and politician.

== Career ==
Bjarkhamar worked as a substitute teacher at Porkeri from 1996 to 1997, employed at Útvarp Føroya from 1997 to 2000 and was also a substitute teacher at Eysturskúlin in Tórshavn from 2001 to 2002. She later trained as a teacher, and since 2008 she has been employed as a consultant at the Faroe Islands' cooperation between the school system, social authorities and the police (SSP). In 1998, Bjarkhamar was chairman of the Tjóðveldisflokkur's restored youth organization, Unga Tjóðveldið. She was Minister of Culture in the Cabinet of Anfinn Kallsberg II.

== Christmas aid campaign ==
Bjarkhamar was the initiator of Í menniskjum gott tokki (In people's well-being), which is a Faroese campaign that raises money for poor Faroese families and distributes gifts to them once a year, shortly before Christmas. The gifts are given on application and processed in collaboration with Faroese authorities. The work started in 2010, while the Faroe Islands had a bourgeois government, which provided tax relief to people with the highest wages, while the low-wage earners received no tax relief. The focus was on the fact that the gap between the affluent and the low-paid and poor was just growing, and that there were many families, especially single parents, who had difficulty coping without the help of family and friends. On Christmas Eve 2014, Bjarkhamar said that 2014 was her last year as coordinator for In People Welfare. The reason she stopped was, according to herself, that she had chronic pain. She told the media that in the five years from 2010 to 2014, the campaign had provided Christmas aid to 1984 families in dire financial straits, and that 3,924 children had benefited from the aid. The aid had a total value of DKK 4.8 million.

== Personal life ==
Bjarkhamar lives in a lesbian relationship with Sonja Jógvansdóttir, who is a member of the Løgting since 2015. She is the daughter of Irdi and Danjal Bjarkhamar from Vágur. Her father has been a city councilor in Vág municipality since 1981.
