= Cabinet of Anfinn Kallsberg II =

The second cabinet of Anfinn Kallsberg was the government of the Faroe Islands from 6 June 2002 until 3 February 2004, with Anfinn Kallsberg from People's Party (Fólkaflokkurin) as Prime Minister. It was a coalition between People's Party (Fólkaflokkurin), Republic (Tjóðveldi), Centre Party (Miðflokkurin) and the Self-Government Party (Sjálvstýrisflokkurin).

	Minister	Party	From	Until
Prime Minister	Anfinn Kallsberg	People's Party	6 June 2002	3 February 2004
Deputy Prime Minister	Høgni Hoydal	Republic	6 June 2002	5 December 2003
Ministry	Minister	Party	From	Until
Ministry of Selfgoverning- and Justice	Høgni Hoydal	Republic	6 June 2002	5 December 2003
Ministry of Fisheries	Jacob Vestergaard	People's Party	17 February 2003	3 February 2004
	Jørgen Niclasen	People's Party	6 June 2002	4 January 2003
Ministry of Culture	Annita á Fríðriksmørk	Republic	17 September 2003	5 December 2003
	Høgni Hoydal	Republic	6 March 2003	17 September 2003
	Annlis Bjarkhamar	Republic	6 June 2002	4 March 2003
Ministry of Finance	Karsten Hansen	Centre Party	6 June 2002	5 December 2003
Ministry of Trade and Industry	Bjarni Djurholm	People's Party	6 June 2002	3 February 2004
Ministry of Oil- and Environment	Eyðun Elttør	Self-Governing Party	6 June 2002	3 February 2004
Ministry of Health	Bill Justinussen	Centre Party	6 June 2002	3 February 2004
Ministry of Social Affairs	Páll á Reynatúgvu	Republic	6 June 2002	5 December 2003
