= Fríðriksmørk =

Fríðriksmørk is a surname. Notable people with the surname include:

- Annita á Fríðriksmørk (born 1968), Faroese politician and teacher
- Marita á Fríðriksmørk (born 1996), Faroese football midfielder
