= Kallsberg =

Kallsberg is a surname of Faroe Islands origin.

== People with the surname ==
- Anfinn Kallsberg (1947–2024), Faroese prime minister
- Katrin Kallsberg (born 1967), Faroese politician
- Poul Kallsberg (born 4 February 2003) is a Faroese professional footballer

== See also ==
- Kallberg
