= Trade unions in the Faroe Islands =

- National organization(s): Samtak, Starvmannafelagið
- Total union membership: ≈15,000 (national)
- Density: 50%

Global Rights Index
- 1 Sporadic violations of rights

International Labour Organization
- The Faroe Islands has separate territorial status but is an ILO member via Denmark

Convention declaration
- Freedom of Association: 28 September 1960
- Right to Organise: 28 September 1960

Trade unions in the Faroe Islands represent most workers in the country. The largest unions are:

- Samtak is a federation of blue collar workers with 5,600 members. The member unions are the Faroe Islands Workers' Association (Føroya Arbeiðarafelag), the Faroe Islands Fishers’ Association (Føroya Fiskimannafelag), the Klaksvik Workers’ Association (Klaksvíkar Arbeiðsmannafelag) and the Klaksvik Working Women's Association (Klaksvíkar Arbeiðskvinnufelag).
- Starvmannafelagið is the union for white collar workers covering office employees, national and local government and public enterprises. It has around 2,400 members.
