= Kallberg =

Surname list

Kallberg is a surname. Notable people with the surname include:

- Aarne Kallberg (1891–1945), Finnish long-distance runner
- Anton Källberg (born 1997), Swedish table tennis player
- Christina Källberg (born 2000), Swedish table tennis player
- Per Källberg (1947–2014), Swedish cinematographer

== See also ==
- Kallsberg
- Kalkberg
