= Kristin Michelsen =

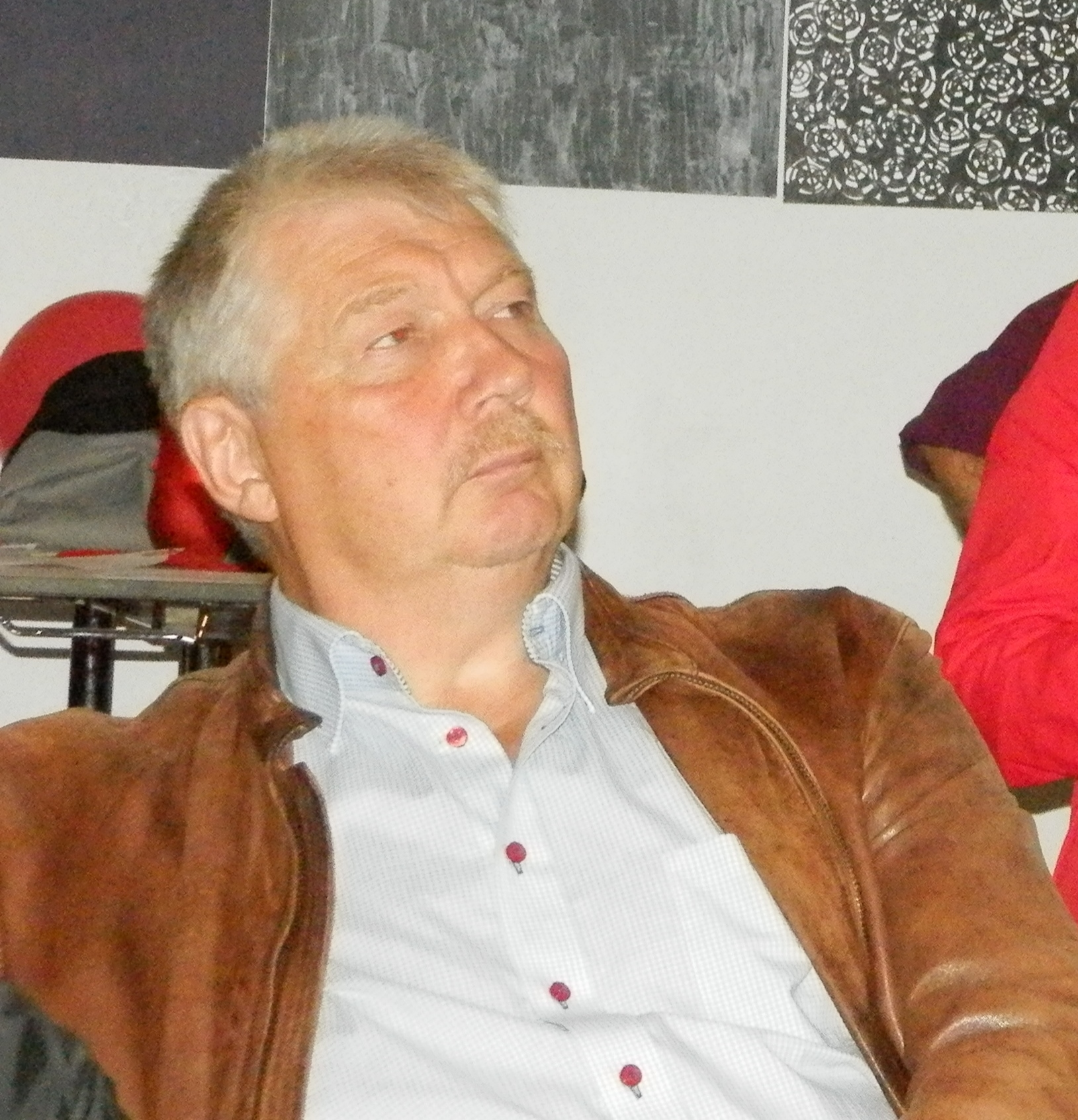
- Kristin Michelsen in 2015

Member of Parliament
- In office 29 October 2011 – 8 December 2022

Mayor of Tvøroyri
- Incumbent
- Assumed office 1 January 2001

Personal details
- Born: 30 July 1956 (age 69) Froðba, Faroe Islands
- Party: Self-Government

Kristin Michelsen (born 30 July 1956 in Froðba) is a Faroese politician (Self-Government).

== Background ==
Michelsen is the son of Vilborg and Mikkjal Michelsen and grandson of the poet Poul F. Joensen. He is married to Joan N. Michelsen from Hvalba, with whom he has a daughter. He was employed in Sjóvinnubankin 1973–1978 and worked as a carpenter 1978–1984. From 1981–2003 he worked as an assistant policeman and principal at the police station and the sysselmann office in Suðuroy 1984–2003.

== Political career ==
Michelsen has been mayor of Tvøroyri since 3 February 2003. In 2008 he wished be a candidate for the parliamentary elections, but was rejected due to the parties quota system based on sex. Associate professor in political science Gestur Hovgaard said that it was a part of the reason why the Social Democratic Party got such bad results in Suðuroy which is the parties stronghold. He was elected for the Løgting at the 2011 Faroese general election. From 2011 to 2015 he was vice chairman of the Rules Committee of the Løgting. At the 2015 Faroese general election he was reelected with 302 votes. He was elected chairman of the Rules Committee of the Løgting.

=== Controversies ===
Since the 2011 parliamentary elections Michelsen has been a controversial politician on several occasions. The coalition parties had the smallest possible majority with only 17 of 33 members of the Løgting. But after only a few days Sonja Jógvansdóttir who was the first openly homosexual person who was elected to the Løgting chose to leave the Social Democratic Party, because she did not wish to be a part of a party which she deemed was ruled by a few homophobic men.

In March 2016 the proposal from four female members of the Løgting which was a proposal to implement the Danish law which allows same-sex marriage in the Faroe Islands got the second reading. But after eight hours of discussions Michelsen and Heðin Mortensen—both from the Social Democratic Party—said that they would not vote for the bill, they recommended instead that the bill be sent back to the Welfare Committee for more thorough reading. Their concern was that the same-sex married couples might enter the Faroese church in order to get their marriage blessed and they were against that.

Another case where Michelsen was against his own party was regarding the fishery politics which was one of the main themes during the electoral campaign of the Social Democratic Party. The party wished to sell the quotas by auction, but Michelsen and Bjarni Hammer, who are mayor and vice mayor of Tvøroyri, were against and therefore the case has not yet been solved. In a debate after the news of Kringvarp Føroya three former politicians discussed the political situation of the Faroe Islands 100 days after the election. Óli Breckmann (People's Party) claimed that Varðin in Gøta who owns the fish factory Varðin Pelagic in Tvøroyri owns the vote of Michelsen and Hammer. He said that the owners of Varðin Pelagic had said to the mayor and vice mayor, that if they voted for the auction, then they would not build a new factory as they had planned, and they would not get 70 new jobs. Michelsen said that it was nonsense, he did not get any vote from Gøta at the 2015 elections, and he was not under the influence of Varðin from Gøta.

Further controversies escalated when disagreements arose between Kristin Michelsen and his local party association Suðuroyar Norðara Javnaðarfelag (Local District Labour Association), concerning the election for the municipality, where the candidate with the most votes usually becomes mayor. Kristin Michelsen wanted all the candidates for Suðuroyar Norðara Javnaðarfelag to sign a written agreement on the matter, with the ultimatum that he would withdraw as candidate, if not signed. Both the committee and the other candidates for Suðuroyar Norðara Javnaðarfelag refused. Following this, Kristin Michelsen refused to communicate with the committee and tried, unsuccessfully, to join a different electoral register slate. The committee for Suðuroyar Norðara Javnaðarfelag had to submit their list to electoral committee and without an answer from Kristin Michelsen, met his ultimatum by removing him from the list. In the meantime Kristin Michelsen had himself hurriedly made for himself a new electoral list, the Kommunulistin, or "Municipality List".

=== Expulsion from the Labour Party ===
Kristin Michelsen's relationship with the Labour Party escalated further, as Kristin Michelsen as an elected representative of the Labour Party, refused to work with other parliament members for the party. Kristin also refused to commit himself to the coalition agreement his party had agreed on and on 3 January 2019, Kristin Michelsen was kicked out of the parliamentary group for the Labour Party. On 8 March 2019, the Labour Party's committee unilaterally withdrew Kristin Michelsen's membership from the party. Citing differences of opinion, working against the party, breaking party rules and making an electoral list in opposition to his own party.

=== Standing committees of the Løgting ===
- 2015– Chairman of the Rules Committee
- 2015– Member of the Finance Committee
- 2011–2015 Vice chairman of the Rules Committee
