= Cabinet of Aksel V. Johannesen I =

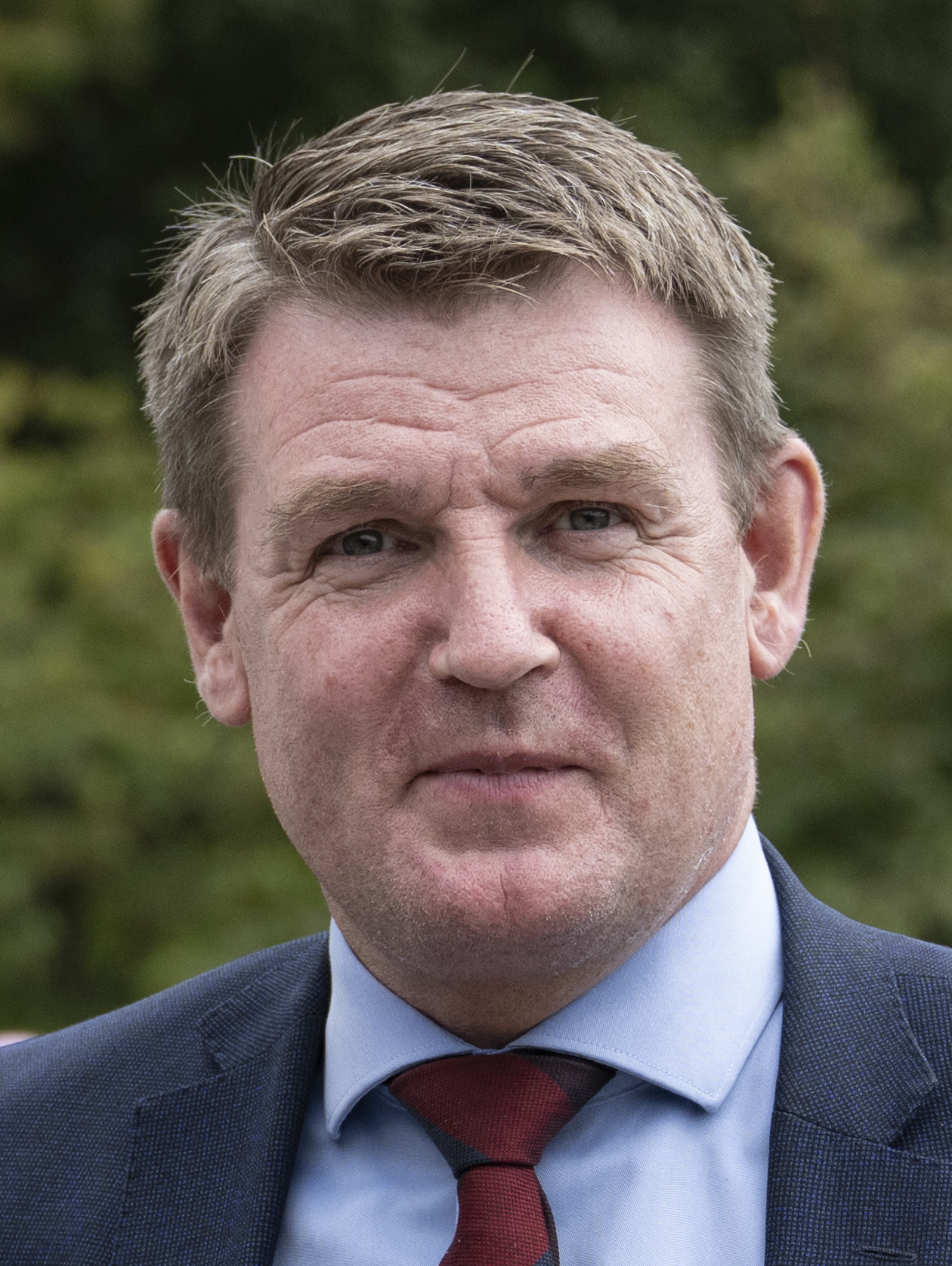
Aksel V Johannesen in 2025

The first cabinet of Aksel V. Johannesen was the government of the Faroe Islands from 15 September 2015 until 16 September 2019, with Aksel V. Johannesen from Social Democratic Party (Javnaðarflokkurin) as Prime Minister, making a coalition between Social Democratic Party, Republic and Progress. The cabinet consists of four men and four women; this is the first time ever, there has been sex equality in the Faroese government.

	Minister	Party	From	Until
Prime Minister	Aksel V. Johannesen	SDP	15 September 2015	16 September 2019
Deputy Prime Minister	Høgni Hoydal	T	15 September 2015	16 September 2019
Ministry	Minister	Party	From	Until
Ministry of Finance	Kristina Háfoss	T	15 September 2015	16 September 2019
Ministry of Health	Sirið Stenberg	T	15 September 2015	16 September 2019
Ministry of Culture	Rigmor Dam	SDP	15 September 2015	16 September 2019
Ministry of Internal Affairs	Henrik Old	SDP	15 September 2015	16 September 2019
Ministry of Fisheries	Høgni Hoydal	T	15 September 2015	16 September 2019
Ministry of Social Affairs	Eyðgunn Samuelsen	SDP	15 September 2015	16 September 2019
Ministry of Foreign Affairs, Trade and Industry	Poul Michelsen	P	15 September 2015	16 September 2019

== See also ==
- Cabinet of the Faroe Islands
- List of members of the Løgting, 2015–19
