= Quarry Hill =

Quarry Hill is the name of several places in the world:

- Quarry Hill, Leeds, England
- Quarry Hill (Hong Kong)
- Quarry Hill, Victoria, in Bendigo, Australia
- Quarry Hill (Greene County, New York), US
- Quarry Hill (Riverside, California), in Riverside, California, US
- Quarry Hill Creative Center, Rochester, Vermont, US
- Quarry Hill Nature Center, Rochester, Minnesota, US
