= Kykuit (Greene County, New York) =

Mountain in New York, United States

- Location within New York Adirondack Park Location within the United States

Highest point
- Elevation: 194 feet (59 m)
- Coordinates: 42°12′13″N 73°52′29″W, 42.2039771°N 73.8740184°W

Geography
- Location: S of Catskill, New York, U.S.
- Topo map(s): USGS Cementon, Hudson South

Kykuit is a mountain in Greene County, New York. It is located in the Catskill Mountains south of Catskill. Kalkberg is located west-southwest of Kykuit.
