= Council of Nordic Trade Unions =

Regional trade union federation

NFS
- Council of Nordic Trade Unions
- Nordens Fackliga Samorganisation (Swedish); Pohjolan Ammatillinen Yhteisjärjestö (Finnish); Nordens Faglige Samorganisasjon (Norwegian); Nordens Faglige Samorganisation (Danish); Norræna verkalýðssambandið (Icelandic)
- Founded: 1972
- Headquarters: Stockholm, Sweden
- Location: Nordic countries
- Members: 9 million
- Key people: Magnus Gissler, general secretary
- Affiliations: Independent
- Website: www.nfs.net

The Council of Nordic Trade Unions (NFS) is a regional trade union federation. It represents 9 million members from 16 national trade unions in the Nordic countries of Europe. It was founded in 1972, and has close ties with the Baltic Sea Trade Union Network (BASTUN). The main task of NFS is to co-ordinate trade union activities in the Nordic countries, particularly with regard to employment, economic policy and different social issues. General Secretary, since 2014, is Magnus Gissler.

== Affiliates ==
Affiliate	Abbreviation	Country
Central Organisation of Finnish Trade Unions	SAK	Finland
Confederation of State and Municipal Employees of Iceland	BSRB	Iceland
Confederation of Unions for Professionals	UNIO	Norway
Confederation of Vocational Unions	YS	Norway
Danish Confederation of Professional Associations	AC	Denmark
Danish Trade Union Confederation	FH	Denmark
Finnish Confederation of Professionals	STTK	Finland
Icelandic Confederation of Labour	ASÍ	Iceland
Icelandic Confederation of University Graduates	BHM	Iceland
Norwegian Confederation of Trade Unions	LO	Norway
Samtak	Samtak	Faroe Islands
National Confederation of Trade Unions of Greenland	SIK	Greenland
Swedish Confederation of Professional Associations	SACO	Sweden
Swedish Confederation of Professional Employees	TCO	Sweden
Swedish Trade Union Confederation	LO	Sweden

== General Secretaries ==
1981: John Svenningsen
1989: Sune Ahlen
2000: Tom Saxén
2011: Loa Brynjulfsdottir
2013: Christina Colclough
2014: Magnus Gissler
