= Confederation of State and Municipal Employees of Iceland =

Federation of trade union in Iceland

BSRB
- BSRB (formerly: Confederation of State and Municipal Employees of Iceland)
- BSR (formerly: Bandalag starfsmanna ríkis og bæja)
- Founded: February 14, 1942
- Headquarters: Reykjavík, Iceland
- Location: Iceland
- Members: 22,000
- Key people: Magnús Már Guðmundsson, manager Sonja Ýr Þorbergsdóttir, chairman
- Affiliations: ITUC, PSI, ETUC, TUAC, NFS
- Website: www.bsrb.is

The BSRB (formerly Bandalag starfsmanna ríkis og bæja) or Confederation of State and Municipal Employees of Iceland is a federation of trade union in Iceland. It was formed in 1942 and is the largest federation of employees in the public sector in Iceland with 25 member unions with over 21,000 members in total. About two in every three members are women.

The BSRB is affiliated with the International Trade Union Confederation, the European Trade Union Confederation, the Council of Nordic Trade Unions and Public Services International.
