= Secretary-General of the Nordic Council =

- Flag of the Nordic Council

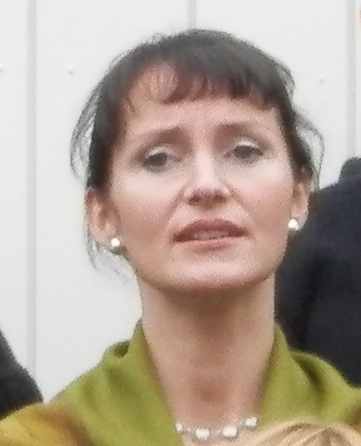
- Incumbent; Kristina Háfoss since 1 February 2021
- Nordic Council Secretariat
- Seat: Nordic Council Headquarters; Copenhagen, Denmark
- Nominator: Nordic Council
- Formation: July 1971
- First holder: Emil Vindsetmoe
- Website: Official website

The secretary-general of the Nordic Council is the head of the Nordic Council Secretariat, one of the principal organs of the Nordic Council. The Nordic parliamentary co-operation, the Nordic Council, is led by the secretary-general in Copenhagen.

The secretary-general together with the Council Secretariat prepares the business procedures which are then processed by the Nordic Council. Preparations are made in consultation and collaboration with the Secretariat for the Nordic Council's national delegations and the party groups. The secretary-general submits reports to the Nordic Council's executive body, the Presidium, which is led by the President of the Nordic Council. The agenda for the Presidium's meetings is drawn up together with the Nordic Council's president.

On 1 February 2021 Kristina Háfoss of the Faroe Islands became the new secretary-general.

== List of secretaries-general ==
Portrait	Name (Born-Died)	Term of office			Country	Ref.
Portrait	Name (Born-Died)	Took office	Left office	Time in office	Country	Ref.
	Emil Vindsetmoe	1971	1973	1–2 years	Norway	
	Helge Seip	1973	1977	3–4 years	Norway	
	Gudmund Saxrud	1977	1982	4–5 years	Norway	
	Ilkka-Christian Björklund	1982	1987	4–5 years	Finland	
	Gerhard af Schultén	1987	1989	1–2 years	Finland	
	Jostein Osnes	1990	1994	3–4 years	Norway	
	Anders Wenström	1994	1996	1–2 years	Sweden	
	Berglind Ásgeirsdóttir	1996	1999	2–3 years	Iceland	
	Frida Nokken	1999	2007	7–8 years	Norway	
	Jan-Erik Enestam	2007	2013	5–6 years	Finland	
	Britt Bohlin Olsson	2014	2021	6–7 years	Sweden	
	Kristina Háfoss	1 February 2021	Incumbent	5 years, 274 days	Faroe Islands	

== See also ==
- Nordic Council
- Nordic countries
