= Páll Klettskarð =

Faroese footballer

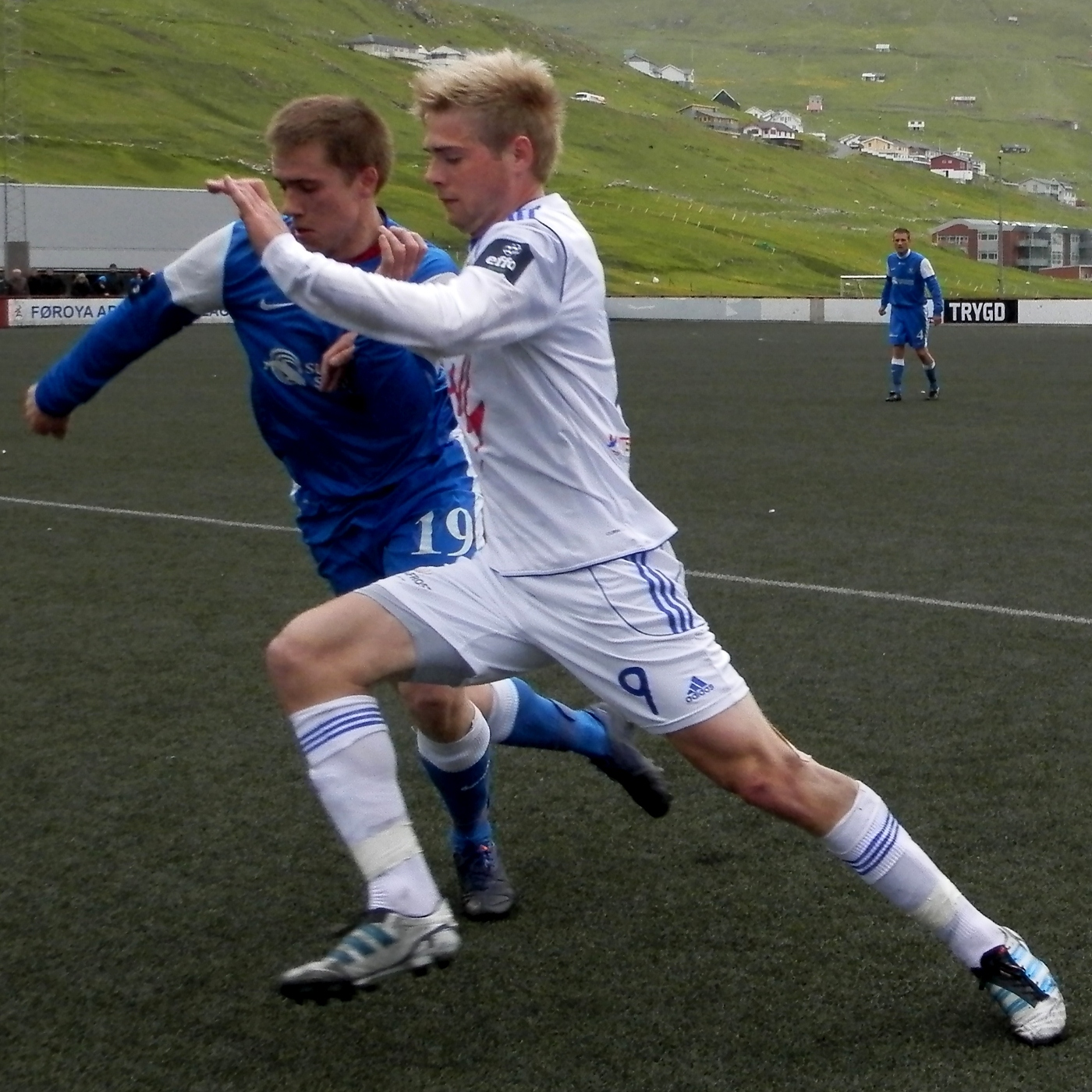

Personal information
- Full name: Páll Andrasson Klettskarð
- Date of birth: 17 May 1990 (age 36)
- Place of birth: Faroe Islands
- Position: Forward

Team information
- Current team: KÍ
- Number: 9

Senior career*
Years	Team	Apps	(Gls)
2007–2009	KÍ	10	(2)
2010–2011	Víkingur	30	(7)
2012–2018	KÍ	177	(103)
2018–2019	Breno	15	(2)
2019–	KÍ	185	(123)

International career^{‡}
2005–2006	Faroe Islands U17	10	(2)
2007–2008	Faroe Islands U19	6	(0)
2009–2012	Faroe Islands U21	14	(0)
2013–	Faroe Islands	22	(0)
- * Club domestic league appearances and goals as of 1 November 2026 ‡ National team caps and goals as of 8 September 2025

Páll Klettskarð (born 17 May 1990) is Faroese footballer who plays as a striker for KÍ and the Faroe Islands national team.

== International career ==
He was called up to the Faroe Islands squad in February 2013 for a training camp held in Thailand and came on as a substitute in a friendly match against the Thailand U23 team. He made his official debut for the Faroe Islands in a World Cup qualifier against Ireland on 7 June 2013. In March 2023, Klettskarð was called up to the national team for the UEFA Euro 2024 qualifying match against Moldova and the friendly against North Macedonia, his first national team call up since 2018.

== Honours ==
Individual

- Effodeildin Best Young Player: 2012
- Effodeildin Topscorer: 2012 (along with Clayton Soares), 2024
- Effodeildin Best Forward: 2013

== Family ==
His mother is Óluva Klettskarð, who was a member of the Faroese parliament from 2011 to 2019 representing Tjóðveldi.

== Controversy ==
Páll Klettskarð sometimes participates in activities which are normal in the Faroe Islands, i.e. sheep herding and pilot whaling. In July 2016 the Faroese news portal Norðlýsið added photos showing Klettskarð and another football player of KÍ Klaksvík participating in the harvesting of a pod of pilot whales in the bay of Hvannasund. The organisation Sea Shepherd Conservation Society used the information and photos in their campaign in order to end the around 1000 year old whaling tradition in the Faroe Islands, Klettskarð received a lot of Facebook-messages after the incident from people who were upset about the news.
