= Samtak =

- Established: 2006; 20 years ago
- Founder: Sonja Jógvansdóttir
- Type: National trade union centre
- Headquarters: Stoffalág 17; FO-100 Tórshavn
- Location: Faroe Islands
- Coordinates: 62.0154368°N 6.7668002°W
- Members: 5,400 (2020)
- Official language: Faroese
- Subsidiaries: 4
- Affiliations: Council of Nordic Trade Unions
- Website: www.samtak.fo

Samtak is a national trade union centre for the Faroe Islands.

The federation was established in 2006 by Sonja Jógvansdóttir, who remains its co-ordinator. The federation has four affiliates, with a total of about 5,600 members, and it is affiliated to the Council of Nordic Trade Unions.

The affiliates of Samtak are:

- Faroe Islands Workers' Association
- Faroe Islands Fishers' Association
- Klaksvik Workers' Association
- Klaksvik Working Women's Association

The Torshavn Workers' Association was formerly affiliated to the federation.
