= Rigmor Dam =

Faroese politician and teacher

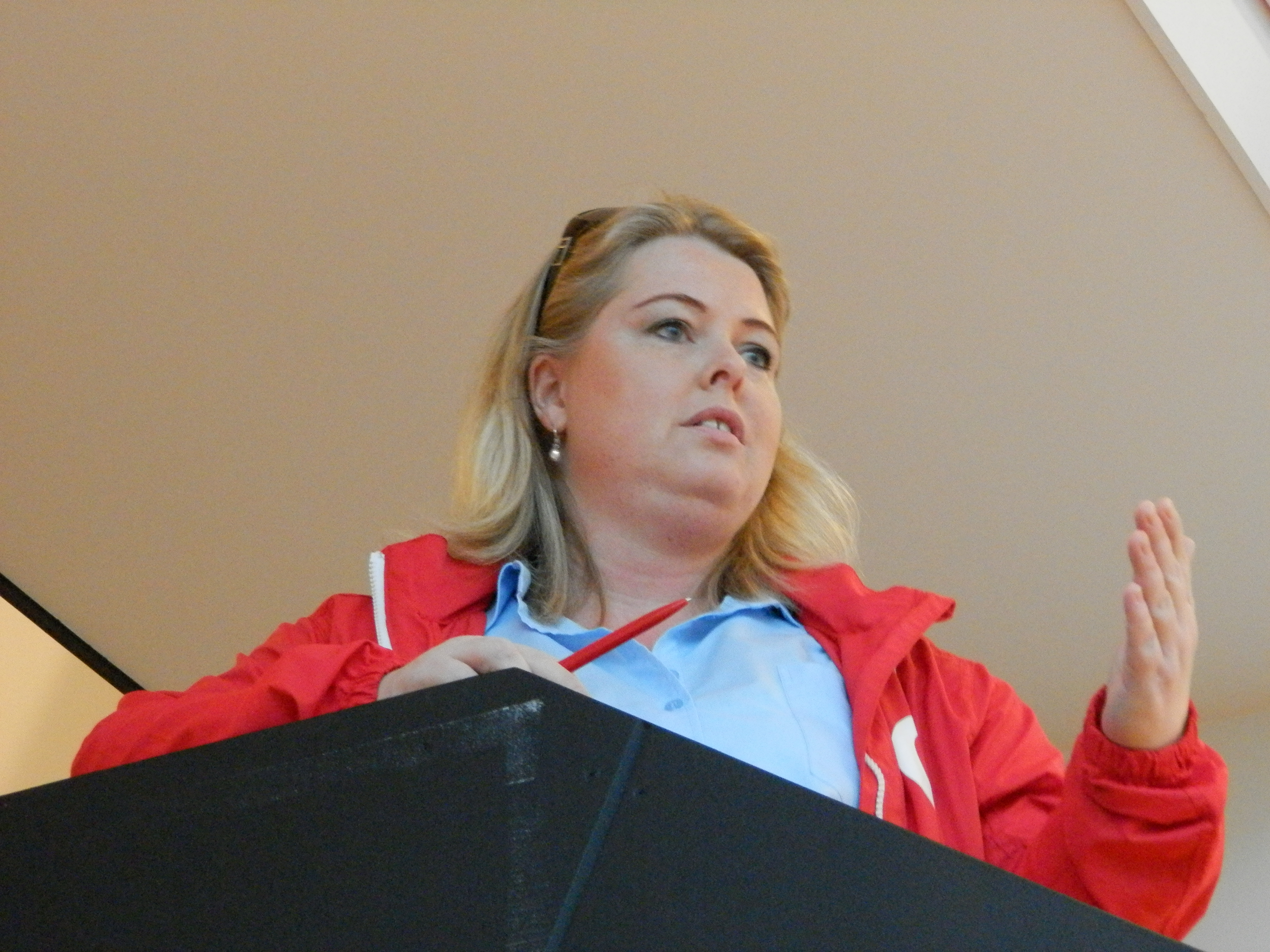
- Rigmor Dam, 2015

Minister of Culture
- In office 15 September 2015 – 21 January 2019
- Preceded by: Bjørn Kalsø

Member of Parliament
- In office 29 October 2011 – 21 January 2019

Personal details
- Born: 18 December 1971 (age 54) Tórshavn, Faroe Islands
- Party: Social Democratic Party (Javnaðarflokkurin)

Rigmor Dam (born 18 December 1971) is a Faroese politician and teacher, she has also been working as a journalist for the Faroese paper Sosialurin before she was elected to the Faroese parliament, the Løgting. She is the current Minister of Education, Research and Culture of the Faroe Islands.

== Political career ==
Dam was elected member of the Faroese parliament for Social Democratic Party (Javnaðarflokkurin) in 2011. At the 2015 elections she was re-elected. On 15 September 2015 she was elected Minister of Culture in the Cabinet of Aksel V. Johannesen.

=== Member of standing committees of the Løgting 2011-15 ===
- Vice chairman for the Welfare Committee (Trivnaðarnevndin)
- Member of the Committee of Culture affairs (Mentanarnevndin)
- Vice member of the Committee of Justice (Rættarnevndin)

== Family ==
Rigmor Dam is the daughter of Durita og Bergur P. Dam, her grandfather on her father's side, was former prime minister Peter Mohr Dam, former prime minister Atli Dam was her uncle and the politician Helena Dam á Neystabø is her cousin. Rigmor Dam is married to Arnbjørn Ó. Dalsgarð, a librarian, writer and one of two editors of the Faroese magazine Vencil. They have three children: Bergur, Sára Maria and Rói.
