= Quarry Hill (Greene County, New York) =

Mountain in New York, United States

- Location within New York Adirondack Park Location within the United States

Highest point
- Elevation: 312 feet (95 m)
- Coordinates: 42°12′40″N 73°54′06″W range_coordinates =

Geography
- Location: W of Catskill, New York, U.S.
- Topo map: USGS Cementon

Quarry Hill is a mountain in Greene County, New York. It is located in the Catskill Mountains west of Catskill. Kalkberg is located south of Quarry Hill.
