= Kalkberg =

Mountain in New York, United States

- Location within New York Adirondack Park Location within the United States

Highest point
- Elevation: 331 feet (101 m)
- Coordinates: 42°11′56″N 73°54′10″W

Geography
- Location: SE of Catskill, New York, U.S.
- Topo map: USGS Cementon

Kalkberg also known as "Collar Back" is a ridge in Greene County, New York, United States. It is located in the Catskill Mountains southeast of Catskill. Kykuit is located east-northeast and Quarry Hill is located north of Kalkberg.
