= Marita á Fríðriksmørk =

Faroese footballer (born 1996)

Personal information
- Date of birth: 12 August 1996 (age 30)
- Position: Midfielder

Team information
- Current team: Víkingur
- Number: 14

Senior career*
Years	Team	Apps	(Gls)
2011–2012	Skála	25	(2)
2013–2014	EBS/Skála	21	(0)
2015–2016	ÍF/Víkingur	45	(3)
2017–2018	EBS/Skála	25	(1)
2019–2020	ÍVB	41	(1)
2021–	Víkingur	5	(0)

International career^{‡}
2013–2014	Faroe Islands U19	6	(0)
2019–	Faroe Islands	5	(0)
- * Club domestic league appearances and goals as of 25 April 2021. ‡ National team caps and goals as of 1 December 2020.

Marita á Fríðriksmørk (born 12 August 1996) is a Faroese footballer who plays as a midfielder for Víkingur and the Faroe Islands women's national team.

== Club career ==
Fríðriksmørk has played for Skála, EBS/Skála, ÍF/Víkingur, ÍVB and Víkingur in the Faroe Islands.

== International career ==
Fríðriksmørk capped for Faroe Islands at senior level during the UEFA Women's Euro 2022 qualifying.
