= List of cultural ministers of the Faroe Islands =

The minister of culture (Faroese: landsstýrismaðurin í mentamálum or mentamálaráðharrin) is a member of the government of the Faroe Islands and head of the Ministry of Education, Research and Culture (Faroese: Mentamálaráðið). The ministry changed its name in 2002 from Ministry of Education and Culture and before 1998 cultural affairs did not have its own ministry but were together with other affairs a part of a ministry. The current Ministry of Culture is responsible for education, science, church, media, sports and other leisure activities.

Period	Name	Party	Ministry
1963–1967	Niels Winther Poulsen	Sjálvstýrisflokkurin	Ministry of Municipalities, Culture and Schools
1967–1972	Sámal Petersen	Sjálvstýrisflokkurin	Ministry of Municipalities, Culture and Schools
1972–1975	Asbjørn Joensen	Sjálvstýrisflokkurin	Ministry of Municipalities, Culture and Schools
1975–1979	Dánjal Pauli Danielsen	Fólkaflokkurin	Ministry of Industry, Agriculture and Cultural Affairs
1981–1985	Tórbjørn Poulsen	Sjálvstýrisflokkurin	Ministry of Finance, Municipalities and Cultural Affairs
1985–1989	Lasse Klein	Sjálvstýrisflokkurin	Ministry of Culture, Communication and Transport
1989	Karl Heri Joensen	Sjálvstýrisflokkurin	Ministry of Culture and Transport
1989–1991	Signar Hansen	Tjóðveldisflokkurin	Ministry of School, Culture and Environment
1991–1993	Marita Petersen	Javnaðarflokkurin	Ministry of Culture, School and Justice
1993	Jóannes Eidesgaard	Javnaðarflokkurin	Ministry of Social-, Health-, Labour- and Cultural Affairs
1993–1994	Bergur Jacobsen	Sjálvstýrisflokkurin	Ministry of Culture and School
1994–1997	Sámal Petur í Grund	Sjálvstýrisflokkurin	Kommunikasjons-, kultur-, turisme- og havbruksdepartementet
1998–2000	Signar á Brúnni	Tjóðveldisflokkurin	Ministry of Education and Culture
2000–2001	Tórbjørn Jacobsen	Tjóðveldisflokkurin	Ministry of Education and Culture
2001–2002	Óli Holm	Tjóðveldisflokkurin	Ministry of Education and Culture
2002–2003	Annlis Bjarkhamar	Tjóðveldisflokkurin	Ministry of Culture
2003	Annita á Fríðriksmørk	Tjóðveldisflokkurin	Ministry of Culture
2004–2008	Jógvan á Lakjuni	Fólkaflokkurin	Ministry of Culture
2008	Kristina Háfoss	Tjóðveldi	Ministry of Culture
2008	Óluva Klettskarð	Tjóðveldi	Ministry of Culture
2008–2011	Helena Dam á Neystabø	Javnaðarflokkurin	Ministry of Culture
2011–2015	Bjørn Kalsø	Sambandsflokkurin	Ministry of Culture
2015–2019	Rigmor Dam	Javnaðarflokkurin	Ministry of Culture
