= Hanna Jensen =

Faroese high school teacher and liberal politician

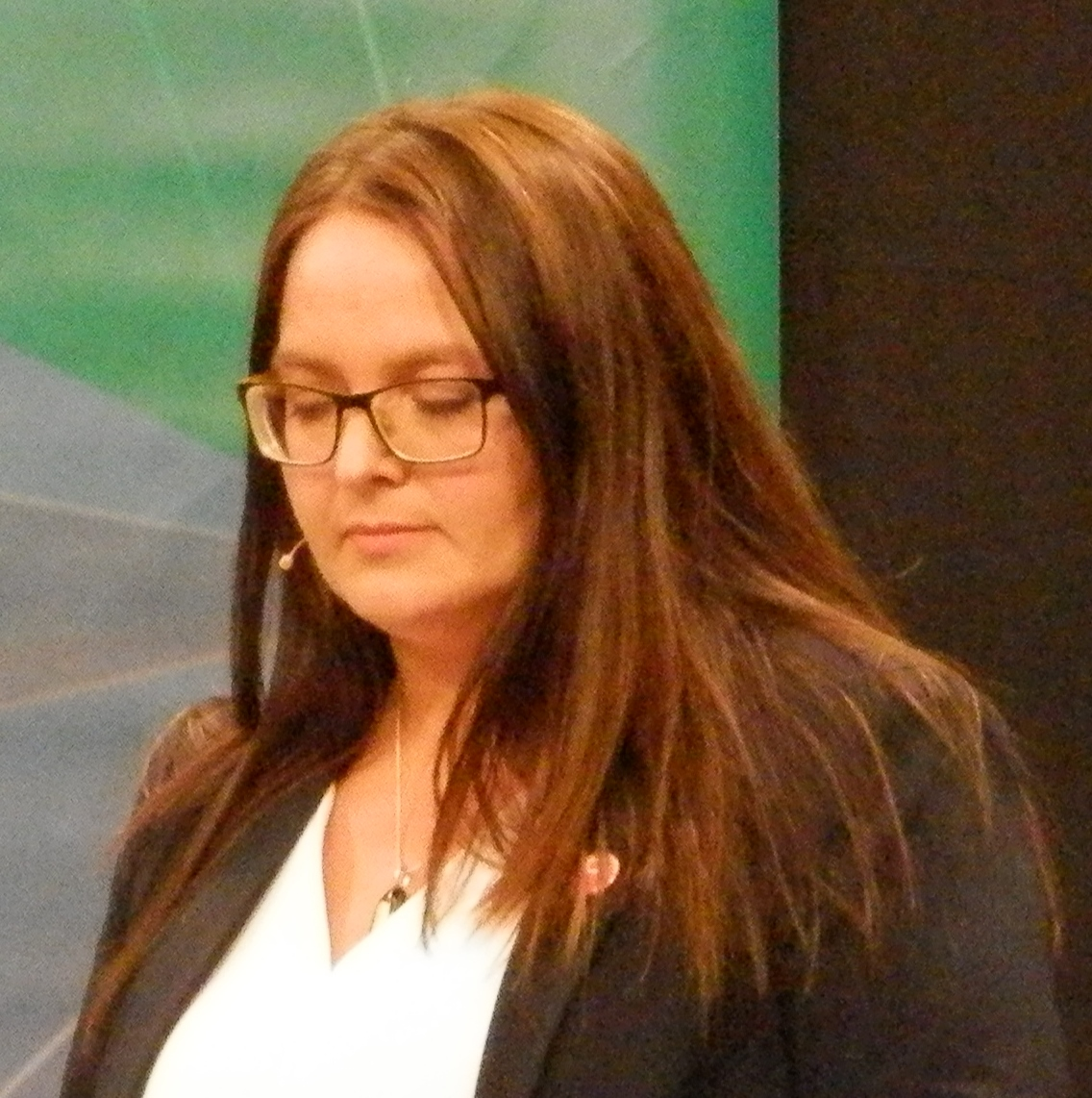

Member of Parliament
- Incumbent
- Assumed office 2015

Personal details
- Born: 19 February 1973 (age 53) Leirvík, Faroe Islands
- Party: Progress (Framsókn)

Hanna Jensen (born 19 February 1973 in Leirvík) is a Faroese high school teacher and a liberal - conservative politician (Progress).

== Biography ==
After finishing high school, Hanna Jensen studied Faroese language and literature at the University of the Faroe Islands. She also took French language and literature at the University of Copenhagen, along with Jurisprudence and Pedagogy. Eventually, she finished with a Cand.mag. degree.

Jensen has been teaching and working as a school counsellor at the high school (gymnasium) in Kambsdalur, Fuglafjørður since 2005. Before that, she was teaching at The Technical college in Klaksvík. She has also been teaching Faroese literature at the Faroese Teachers School (Føroya Læraraskúli) in Tórshavn . Currently, she lives in Norðragøta.

Additionally, Jensen has been the French Consul General of the Faroe Islands since 2010.

== Political career ==
Jensen's political career started in 2007 when she was elected to the local council of Gøta Municipality, where she was a member for one year from 1 January 2008 until 31 December 2008. She continued to be a member of the new merged council of Eystur Municipality, which was a merger between Leirvík and Gøta. Since 2009, she has been a member of Eystur Municipality. She was the chairperson of the Culture and Social Committee from 2009-2012 and the chairperson of the Culture Committee since 2013.

Jensen represented the People's Party until 2011, when she, together with Poul Michelsen, established the political party Progress (Framsókn). Since then, Jensen has been the deputy leader of Progress and was the party's vice member to the parliament from 2011 until 2015, where she took a seat in parliament on several occasions for Michelsen and Janus Rein.

Jensen was elected for the Løgting at the general election in 2015.

=== Bill on same sex marriage ===
On 24 September 2015, Hanna Jensen along with the independent member of the Løgting Sonja Jógvansdóttir, Social Democratic member Kristianna Winther Poulsen and Republic member Bjørt Samuelsen, submitted a same-sex marriage bill to the Parliament Secretariat. The bill entered Parliament on 17 November 2015. If approved, the law would be scheduled to go into effect on 1 July 2016. The first reading took place on 24 November 2015. The second reading is expected to take place in the week that starts on 7 March 2016.
