= Kristina Háfoss =

Secretary General of the Nordic Council

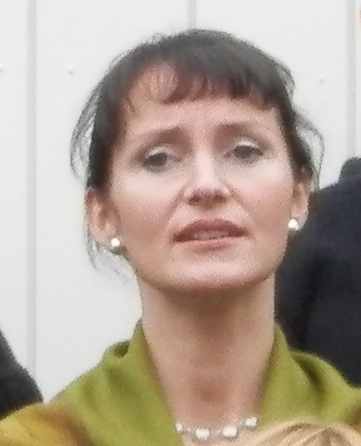
- Kristina Háfoss in 2012

Secretary-General of the Nordic Council
- Incumbent
- Assumed office 1 February 2021
- Preceded by: Britt Bohlin Olsson

Minister of Finance
- In office 15 September 2015 – 16 September 2019
- Prime Minister: Aksel V. Johannesen
- Preceded by: Jørgen Niclasen
- Succeeded by: Jørgen Niclasen

Member of Parliament
- In office 29 October 2011 – 31 January 2021
- Constituency: Faroe Islands

Minister of Culture
- In office 4 February 2008 – 30 August 2008
- Prime Minister: Jóannes Eidesgaard
- Preceded by: Jógvan á Lakjuni
- Succeeded by: Óluva Klettskarð

Member of Parliament
- In office 30 April 2002 – 20 January 2004
- Constituency: Suðurstreymoy

Personal details
- Born: Kristina Danielsen; 26 June 1975 (age 51) Copenhagen, Denmark
- Party: Republic
- Spouse: Ronnie Háfoss
- Children: 4

Kristina Háfoss (born Danielsen; 26 June 1975) is a Faroese economist, lawyer, politician (Tjóðveldi) and former national swimmer for the Faroe Islands. She was Minister of Finance of the Faroe Islands from 2015 to 2019. She was elected for the Løgting again in 2019, but took leave from 1 February 2021 when she started in her new job as the Secretary-General of the Nordic Council.

== Background ==
She lived in Copenhagen for the first four years of her life, while her father was studying and her mother was working. After that she grew up in the Faroe Islands, mostly in Argir, which today has grown together with Tórshavn. She is the daughter of John P. Danielsen from Klaksvík and Anna Helena Danielsen (born Zachariasen) from Tórshavn. Her grandfather on her mother's side was Louis Zachariasen from Kirkja on the small island Fugloy. He was a teacher but stopped teaching when he could not teach the children in the Faroese language. He was a politician for the Home Rule Party.

Háfoss was a competition swimmer when she was a child and teenager, she swam for the local club in Tórshavn, Havnar Svimjifelag and for the Faroe Islands. The swimming brought her together with another Faroese swimmer, Annika Olsen, who also became a politician later, they became friends at a young age and both were swimming for the Faroe Islands national team. After stopping her swimming career while attending high school in Hoydalar, she began playing volleyball on club level.

Háfoss has degrees as Candidate of Law (Cand.jur.) from 2002 and economics (Cand.polit.) from 2003, both degrees taken from the University of Copenhagen. Háfoss was employed by the Danish Ministry of Foreign Affairs 1998–1999, by the Ministry of Finance 1999–2000 and by the Prime Ministers Office in the Faroe Islands in the summer periods of 1999 and 2000. She was economical advisor under the work of Action Plan for the outlying islands of the Faroes (in Faroese called Útoyggjar, the small islands which have very small populations and are not connected to the main area of the Faroes) 2000–2001, she worked as an economist in the Landsbanki Føroya 2004–2005 and Project Manager and investment advisor in Føroya Banki in 2006. From 2007 until 2011 she was the Head of Department at The Faroe Insurance Company.

== Political career ==
Háfoss was deputy president of the næstformand i the Voters Union (Valfelag) of Suðurstreymoyar Tjóðveldisfelag 2001–2002. She was elected to the Løgting from South Streymoy 2002–2004, she was member of Republic's Tjóðveldisflokkurins working committee 2004–2005. In February 2008 she became Minister of Culture in the second cabinet of Jóannes Eidesgaard, but withdraw from the position for personal reasons a half year later. On 29 October 2011 she was again elected to the Faroese parliament with 451 personal votes which was second most on the Tjóðveldi list, next after Høgni Hoydal.

=== Member of standing committees of the Løgting ===
- 2002–2004 member of the Finance Committee
- 2011–2015 deputy chairperson of the Finance Committee
- 2019–2021 member of the Finance Committee
