= Bjørt Samuelsen =

Faroese journalist, master in food science and politician

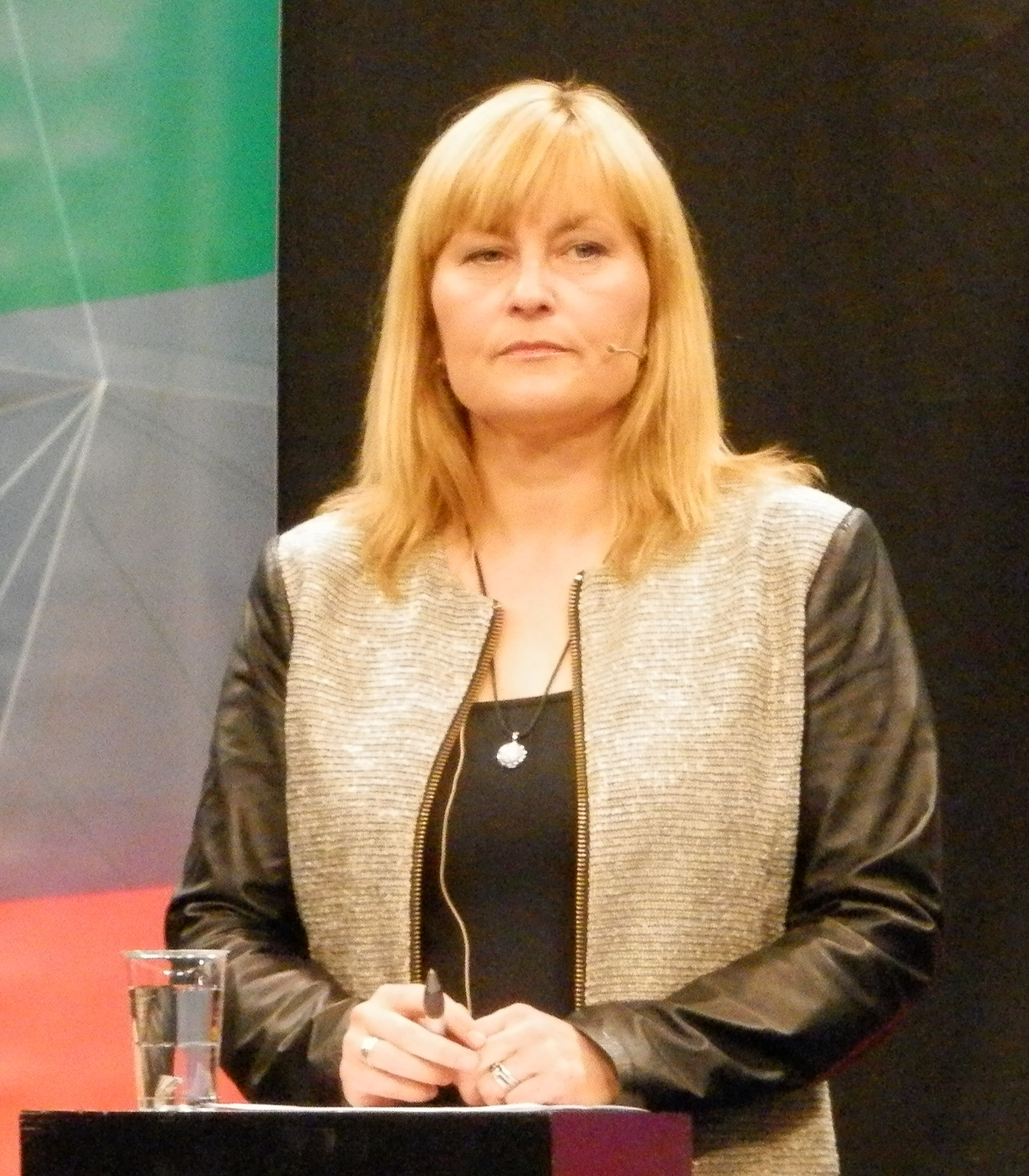
- Samuelsen in 2015

Speaker of the Løgting
- In office 22 December 2022 – 13 April 2026
- Preceded by: Jógvan á Lakjuni
- Succeeded by: Johan Dahl

Member of Parliament
- Incumbent
- Assumed office 2008

Ministers of Trade and Industry
- In office February 2008 – September 2008

Personal details
- Born: 2 March 1965 (age 61) Tórshavn, Faroe Islands
- Party: Republic (Tjóðveldi)

Bjørt Samuelsen (2 March 1965) is a Faroese journalist and politician who has been the Speaker of the Løgting since 2022. She is a member of the Republic party.

== Early life ==
Samuelsen was born on 2 March 1965, in Tórshavn. She obtained a master's degree in food science (Danish: bromatolog, cand.brom.).

== Political career ==
She was elected for the Løgting at the 2008 Faroese general election and again in 2011. She was not elected at the 2015 elections, but kept her seat in the parliament because Høgni Hoydal was appointed minister of fisheries. Samuelsen was Ministers of Trade and Industry from 4 February until 15 September 2008. She was the first female minister of trade and industry of the Faroe Islands and as of 2019 the only one. Bjørt Samuelsen was named Speaker of the Løgting in December 2022.

=== Bill on same sex marriage ===
On 24 September 2015 Bjørt Samuelsen along with the independent member of the Løgting Sonja Jógvansdóttir, Social Democratic member Kristianna Winther Poulsen and Progress member Hanna Jensen, submitted a same-sex marriage bill to the Parliament Secretariat. The bill entered Parliament on 17 November 2015. If approved, the law would be scheduled to go into effect on 1 July 2016. The first reading took place 24 November 2015. The second reading is expected to take place in the week that starts on 7 March 2016.

=== Standing Committees of the Løgting, Nordic Council and Westnordic Council ===
- 2008–2011 member of Standing Committee on Business
- 2008–2011 member of Standing Committee on Justice
- 2011–2015 vice chairperson for the Standing Committee on Business
- 2011–2015 member of the Standing Committee on Welfare
- 2011–2015 vice member of Standing Committee on Foreign affairs
- 2011–2015 vice member of Nordic Council
- 2015–2019 member of the Committee of Foreign Affairs
- 2015–2019 member of West Nordic Council
- 2015–2019 member of the Committee of Industry, Fisheries, Aqua- and Agriculture
- 2015–2019 vice member of the Committee of Finance
- 2015–2019 vice member of the Social - and Health Committee
- 2017–2019 Chairman of the Committee of Industry, Fisheries, Aqua- and Agriculture
