= Katrin Kallsberg =

Faroese politician and gynaecologist

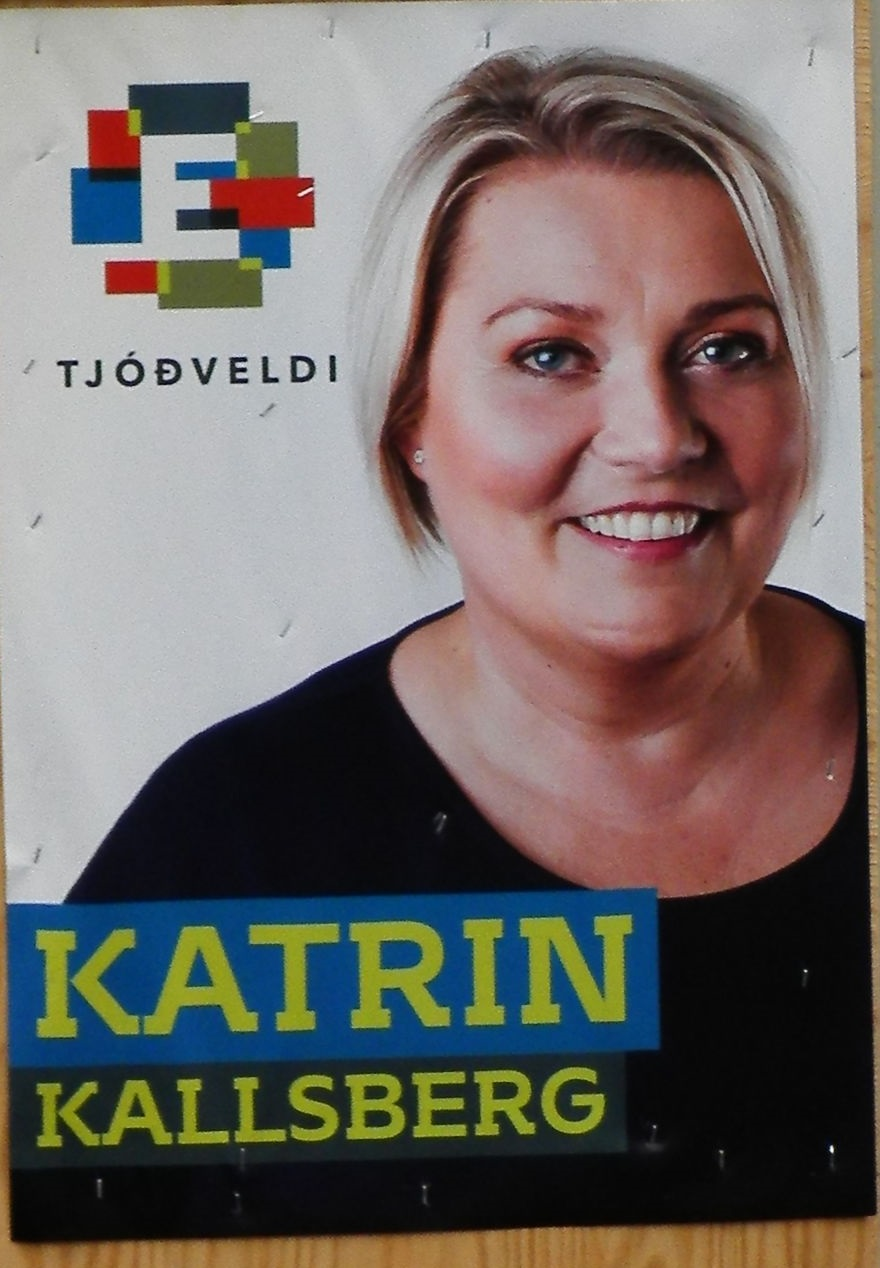
- Kallsberg is on the poster from the parliamentary election 2015

Member of Parliament
- In office 2015–2019

Personal details
- Born: 30 July 1967 (age 58) Denmark
- Party: Republic (Tjóðveldi)

Katrin Kallsberg (born 30 July 1967 in Denmark) is a Faroese gynaecologist and politician Republic (Tjóðveldi).

== Early life and education ==
Katrin Kallsberg was born, 30 July 1967, in Denmark. Her parents, Olga and Kaj Kallsberg, are Faroese. She lived in Denmark the first six years of her life, until the family moved back to the Faroe Islands. The rest of her childhood she lived in Eiði (1975-1979) and Tórshavn where her father Kaj Kallsberg was working as a physician. At the age of 16 she spent one year in the U.S. as an exchange student. After that she went to the high school of Tórshavn in Hoydalar. She studied medicine in Denmark and specialized to become a gynaecologist.

== Career ==
=== Medical career ===
In 1995, she worked as a physician in Srebrenica with Doctors Without Borders for a short period. After Screbrenica, she moved back to the Faroe Islands to work as a gynaecologist and consultant surgeon at the hospital in Tórshavn, Landssjúkrahúsið.

Kallsberg was chairwomen of the Faroese Equal Status Council (Javnstøðunevndin) from March 2012 until February 2016. She participated in the Faroese TV-documentary Fólksins Rødd and participates in the Faroese radio debate programme Also.

=== Political career ===
She was elected to the Løgting representing Republic (Tjóðveldi) at the 2015 general election with 396 personal votes.

- 2015-2019 Chairwoman of the Welfare Committee
- 2015-2019 Member of the Culture Committee

== Personal life ==
Kallsberg's husband, Poul Henrik Poulsen, died from cancer, in 2005. They have two children.
