= Jógvan Skorheim =

Faroese politician and businessperson

- Skorheim in 2012

Member of Parliament
- In office 14 November 2011 – 31 December 2012

Leader of Self-Government Party
- Incumbent
- Assumed office 9 April 2015
- Preceded by: Kári P. Højgaard

Mayor of Klaksvík
- Incumbent
- Assumed office 1 January 2013
- Preceded by: Gunvá við Keldu

Personal details
- Born: 16 June 1982 (age 44) Klaksvík, Faroe Islands
- Party: Self-Government (Sjálvstýri)

Jógvan Skorheim (born 16 June 1982 in Klaksvík) is a Faroese businessman and politician, serving as the leader of the Self-Government (Sjálvstýri) political party since 9 April 2015.

Skorheim has been working as a salesman for Idé Møblar in Tórshavn and Vøruhúsið in Klaksvík and as a marketing manager at the EL-IN in Klaksvík.

== Political career ==
Skorheim was leader of Unga Sjálvstýri until 2011. He has been a member of the town council of Klaksvík since 1 January 2009, and deputy mayor, chairman of Culture Affairs, deputy chairman of Finance Committee and member of Technical Committee from 1 January 2009 until 31 December 2012. Since 1 January 2013 he is the mayor of Klaksvík representing Self-Government Party (Sjálvstýrisflokkurin), together with Tjóðveldi and Javnaðarflokkurin.

At the parliamentary election in 2011, the Self-Government Party got one member elected, Kári P. Højgaard was elected with 317 votes and Skorheim became his deputy member with 245 votes. Højgaard was minister of internal affairs, and Skorheim took seat in the parliament from 14 November 2011 until 31 December 2012, this period he was member of the Commerce Committee. Three weeks after Skorheim was elected as mayor of Klaksvík on 1 January 2013, he took leave from the parliament from 22 January 2013, instead Kristianna Winther Poulsen took seat in the Løgting for six months, after that Skorheim took seat again in the Løgting. Skorheim left the parliament again in September 2013 when the prime minister sacked Højgaard on 5 September 2013 because of the Eysturoy-tunnel-case and took seat again in the parliament.

On 9 April 2015 Højgaard withdrew as the leader of the party because he was concerned about the judge examination of the Eysturoy-tunnel-case, and Skorheim became new leader.
