= Sonja Jógvansdóttir =

Faroese journalist and politician

Member of Parliament
- In office 15 September 2015 – August 2019

Personal details
- Born: 9 November 1977 (age 48) Tórshavn, Faroe Islands
- Party: None, earlier Social Democratic Party (Javnaðarflokkurin)

Sonja J. Jógvansdóttir (born 9 November 1977 in Tórshavn) is a Faroese journalist, politician, and establisher and coordinator of Samtak, the Faroese trade union center. Until 2015, she was a member of Social Democratic Party (Javnaðarflokkurin). She is a spokesperson for the rights of homosexual people and their rights in the Faroe Islands and was one of the establishers of LGBT Faroe Islands in 2011.

== Political career ==
On 1 September 2015, Jógvansdóttir became the first Faroese person, who lives openly as a homosexual, who was elected to the Faroese parliament. She received second most votes of the Social Democratic Party. A few days after the election and just after the government of Aksel V. Johannesen was appointed, she left the Social Democratic Party. The reason she left according to herself was that she did not wish to be a part of a homophobic party, as she felt that it was. At the same time she promised that she would support the government of Aksel V. Johannesen. As of March 2016, she is still an independent politician in the Løgting. The government coalition parties of the Løgting have only 16 members of 33, after the exit of Jógvansdóttir.

=== Bill on same sex marriage ===
On 24 September 2015, Jógvansdóttir along with Republic member of the Løgting Bjørt Samuelsen, Social Democratic member Kristianna Winther Poulsen and Progress member Hanna Jensen, submitted a same-sex marriage bill to the Parliament Secretariat. The bill entered Parliament on 17 November 2015. If approved, the law would be scheduled to go into effect on 1 July 2016. The first reading took place 24 November 2015. The second reading of the bill was held on 16 March 2016, after which modifications were made. The bill was passed by the Løgting on 29 April 2016, ratified by the Folketing in April 2017, and went into effect on 1 July 2017.
