= Jógvan á Lakjuni =

Faroese politician, composer and teacher

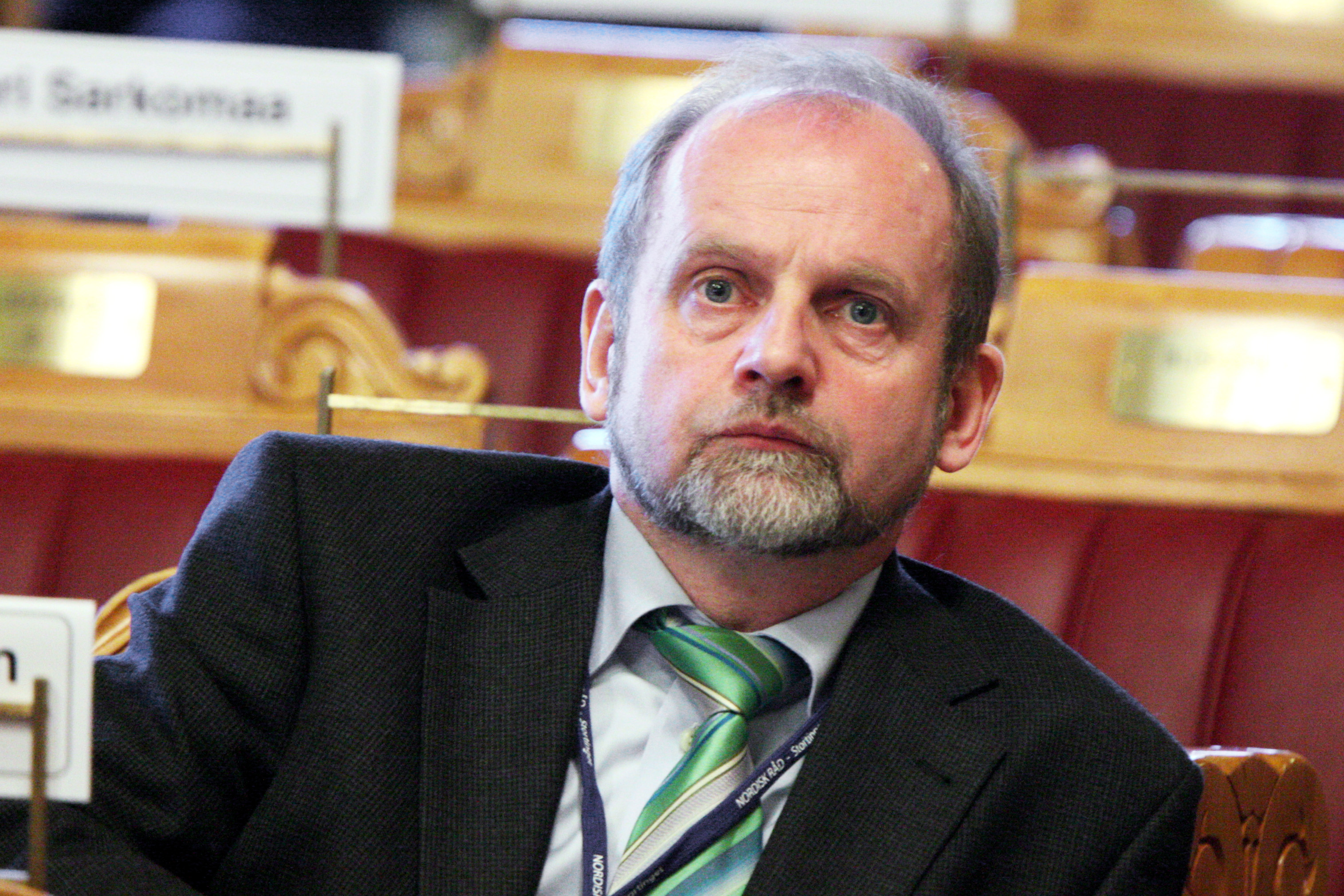
- Jógvan á Lakjuni, 2007

Speaker of the Løgting
- In office 2019 – 21 December 2022
- Preceded by: Páll á Reynatúgvu
- Succeeded by: Bjørt Samuelsen
- In office 2011–2015
- Preceded by: Hergeir Nielsen
- Succeeded by: Páll á Reynatúgvu

Member of Parliament
- In office 1998–2022

Minister of Culture
- In office 3 February 2004 – 4 February 2008
- Preceded by: Annita á Fríðriksmørk
- Succeeded by: Kristina Háfoss

Personal details
- Born: 13 November 1952 (age 73) Fuglafjørður, Faroe Islands
- Party: People's Party (Fólkaflokkurin)
- Spouse: Odvør Gunnarsson
- Children: 5, including Bárður
- Relatives: Victor Danielsen (grandfather)

Jógvan á Lakjuni (born 13 November 1952) is a Faroese politician, composer and teacher. He was speaker of the Faroese parliament, the Løgting, from 2011 to 2015 and from 2019 to 2022.

He was born in Fuglafjørður. He worked as a fisherman from 1969 to 1972. He was educated as a school teacher in 1977, and worked as a school teacher in Fuglafjørður from 1977 to 1989. During this period he also studied at the University of the Faroe Islands and since 1989 has worked as a high school teacher at Føroya Handilsskúli in Kambsdalur.

== Political career ==
Jógvan á Lakjuni was elected member of the Faroese Løgting in 1998, but before that he had been substitute member several times in the period 1989 to 1996. He was minister of culture in the first cabinet of Jóannes Eidesgaard. He was the speaker of the Faroese parliament, the Løgting from 2011 to 2015 and from 2019 to 2022. He was president of the West Nordic Council from 2002 to 2003. He was reelected to the parliament on 1 September 2015 and in 2019. In 2022 he decided to stop in politics.

=== Member of Committees of the Løgting ===
- 2008–2012 vice chairman of the Culture Committee
- 2002–2004 member of the Foreign Affairs Committee
- 2000–2002 chairman of the Culture Committee
- 1998–2002 member of the Næringskomiteen
- 1998–2000 member of the Culture Committee

== Musical career ==
He has been active musician since he was young. He plays the piano and has been the leader of local choirs of his hometown Fuglafjørður. In the 1980s he was one of the members of the choir called Bros. He has composed melodies for psalms and other religious and traditional Faroese songs i.e. to poems from the Faroese poet Hans Andrias Djurhuus, he also composed a new melody for the psalm Gakk tú tryggur, which is a popular psalm in the Faroes. Á Lakjuni is a member of the Plymouth Brethren (called Brøðrasamkoman in the Faroes), but his melody is also used in the Church of the Faroes (Fólkakirkjan). Together with his son Bárður á Lakjuni, he released an album in 2012, Gakk tú tryggur. Jógvan á Lakjuni composed melodies for seven of the songs, and his son composed five of the songs on the album.
