= List of ministers of trade and industry of the Faroe Islands =

The minister of trade and industry (Faroese: landsstýrismaðurin í vinnumálum, also called vinnumálaráðharrin), earlier the minister of industry (landsstýrismaðurin í ídnaðarmálum, also called ídnaðarmálaráðharrin), is a member of the Faroese government and is responsible for trade, including natural resources except for fisheries, which mostly has its own ministry, labour environment, business, aquaculture etc.

| Period | Name | Party | Ministry |
|---|---|---|---|
| 1963–1967 | Karsten Hoydal | Tjóðveldisflokkurin | Ministry of Industry and Agriculture |
| 1968–1979 | Jacob Lindenskov | Javnaðarflokkurin | Ministry of Health, Social Affairs, Industry and Justice |
| 1979–1981 | Vilhelm Johannesen | Javnaðarflokkurin | Ministry of Health, Social Affairs, Industry and Justice |
| 1985–1989 | Vilhelm Johannesen | Javnaðarflokkurin | Ministry of Industry and Labour |
| 1989–1991 | Olaf Olsen | Fólkaflokkurin | Ministry of Industry, Health and Agriculture |
| 1991–1994 | Thomas Arabo | Javnaðarflokkurin | Ministry of Fishery and Industry |
| 1994–1995 | Óli Jacobsen | Verkamannafylkingin | Ministry of Industry, Trade, Labour, Agriculture, Safety and Justice |
| 1995–1996 | Axel H. Nolsøe | Verkamannafylkingin | Ministry of Industry, Trade, Labour, Agriculture, Safety and Justice |
| 1996–1998 | Ivan Johannesen | Sambandsflokkurin | Ministry of Trade, Aquaculture and Agriculture |
| 1998–2000 | Finnbogi Arge | Fólkaflokkurin | Ministry of Trade and Industry |
| 2000–2008 | Bjarni Djurholm | Fólkaflokkurin | Ministry of Trade and Industry |
| 2008 | Bjørt Samuelsen | Tjóðveldi | Ministry of Trade and Industry |
| 2008–2015 | Johan Dahl | Sambandsflokkurin | Ministry of Trade and Industry |
| 2015–2019 | Poul Michelsen | Progress | Ministry of Trade, Industry and Foreign affairs |
| 2019–2021 | Helgi Abrahamsen | Union | Ministry of Trade and Industry |
| 2021–2022 | Magnus Rasmussen | Union | Ministry of Trade and Industry |
| 2022– | Høgni Hoydal | Republic | Ministry of Trade, Industry and Foreign affairs |
