= Helena Dam á Neystabø =

Faroese politician

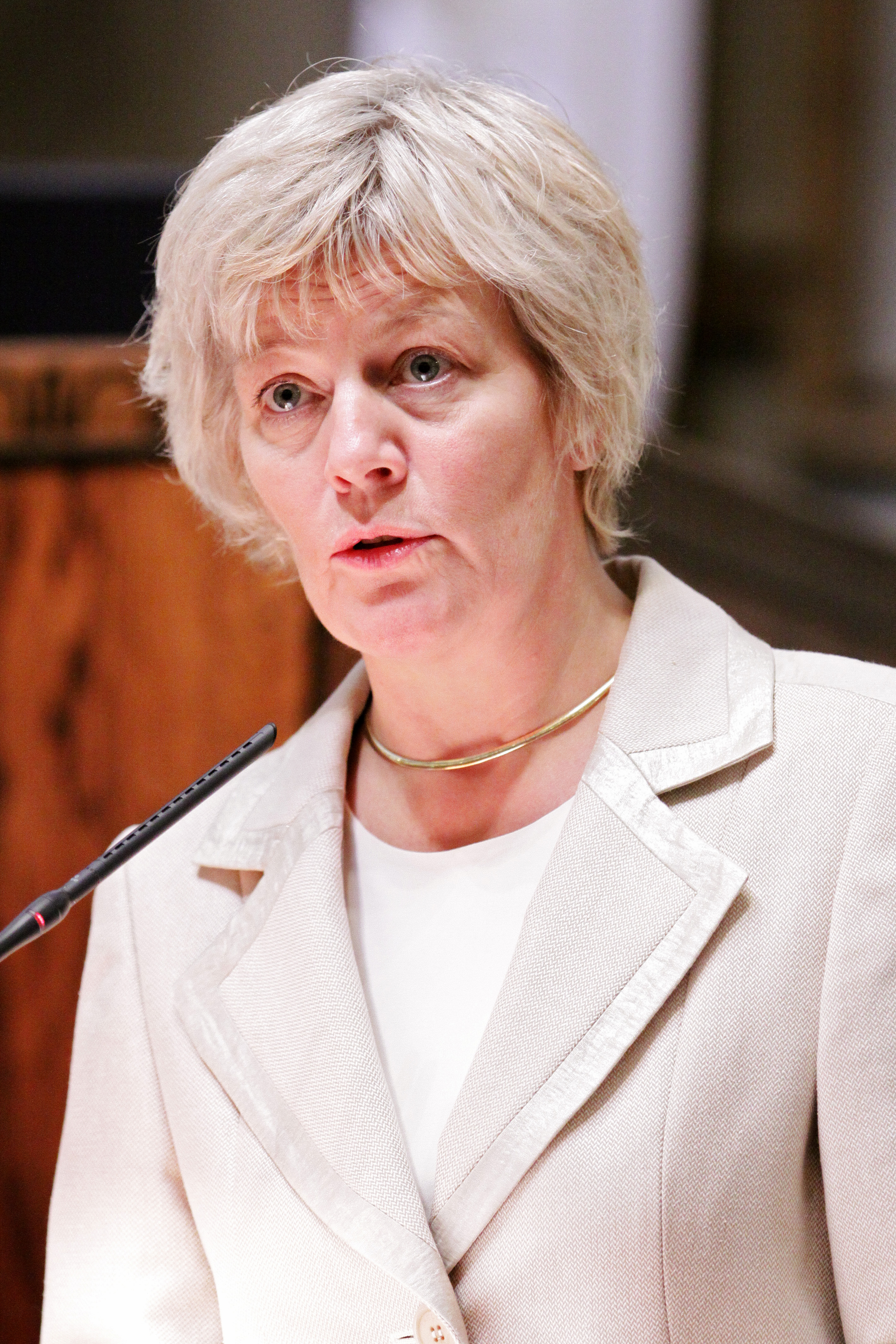
- Neystabø as Minister of Culture

Minister of Culture
- In office 26 September 2008 – 14 November 2011
- Prime Minister: Kaj Leo Johannesen
- Preceded by: Óluva Klettskarð
- Succeeded by: Bjørn Kalsø

Minister of Justice
- In office 4 February 2008 – 26 September 2008
- Prime Minister: Jóannes Eidesgaard
- Preceded by: Heðin Zachariasen
- Succeeded by: Annika Olsen

Minister of Social Affairs and Health
- In office 15 May 1998 – 26 February 2001
- Prime Minister: Anfinn Kallsberg
- Preceded by: Axel Nolsøe
- Succeeded by: Sámal Petur í Grund

Personal details
- Born: Helena Dam; 10 December 1955 (age 70) Copenhagen, Denmark
- Party: JF
- Spouse: Kristian á Neystabø
- Education: University of Copenhagen

Helena Dam á Neystabø (born 10 December 1955) is a Faroese Social Democratic politician. She has been served in the Lagting from 1990 to 2002, 2008 to 2011 and 2015 to 2019, has been a minister in three governments, and has been a member of the Tórshavn municipal council.

== Biography ==
Neystabø grew up in Copenhagen as the daughter of seminar teacher Ása Hátún and Atli Dam, the Faroese Social Democratic Prime Minister. Her grandfather Peter Mohr Dam was also Prime Minister. Her parents divorced when she was nine years old, and she moved to the Faroe Islands with her mother when she was 13 years of age. In 1981, she married director Kristian á Neystabø from Haldórsvík; one of their children is musician Dánjal á Neystabø.

Neystabø has a master's degree in German and Danish language and literature from the University of Copenhagen in 1983 and Master of Public Administration. After graduating, she has lived in the Faroe Islands, where she was first a high school teacher at Eysturoy, then a clerk in the Directorate of Education with responsibility for vocational training. In 1988, she was a consultant at Færøyenes skolebokforlag and in 1990, was general manager. In 2012, she became principal at Føroya Handilsskúli.
