= Óluva Klettskarð =

Faroese politician

Óluvá Klettskarð

Minister of Culture
- In office 30 August 2008 – 15 September 2008
- Preceded by: Kristina Háfoss
- Succeeded by: Helena Dam á Neystabø

Member of the Løgting
- In office 15 September 2015 – 16 September 2019

Personal details
- Born: 24 June 1965 (age 61) Klaksvík, Faroe Islands
- Party: Republic (Tjóðveldi)
- Spouse: Andras Sólstein
- Children: 2

Óluva Elin Klettskarð (born 24 June 1965) is a Faroese schoolteacher and politician. She was a member of the Løgting from 2015 to 2019.

== Early life and career ==
Klettskarð was in Klaksvík on 24 June 1965, the daughter of Páll Klettskarð from Haraldssund and his wife Edith (born Stenberg) from Porkeri. The parents ran their own business in Klaksvík, and the father later became a fishing boat owner. From 1991 to 1996, she attended the University of the Faroe Islands, obtaining a degree in history and Nordic philology. Since 1997, she has been a teacher at Føroya Studentaskúli og HF-Skeið in Tórshavn.

== Political career ==
Klettskarð has been chairman of the main board of Republic (Tjóðveldi) and a member of the party's working committee. She has been a member of the municipal council in Klaksvík from 2009 to 2016 and was a member of the Lagting for several election periods. For two weeks in the autumn of 2008, she was Minister of Culture before Tjóðveldi left the government. From 2015 to 2019, she was a member of the Lagting, whereas her cousin Sirið Stenberg served as Minister of Health.

== Personal life ==
Óluva is married to Andras Sólstein, and they have two sons: Páll Andrasson Klettskarð (b. 1990) who is a footballer, and Ári Andrasson Klettskarð (b. 2001).
