= 2015 Faroese general election =

Danish territorial election

- 1 September 2015
- Turnout: 88.8%
Party	Leader	Vote %	Seats	+/–
Social Democratic	Aksel V. Johannesen	25.1%	8	+2
Republic	Høgni Hoydal	20.7%	7	+1
People's	Jørgen Niclasen	18.9%	6	−2
Union	Kaj Leo Johannesen	18.7%	6	−2
Progress	Poul Michelsen	7.0%	2	0
Centre	Jenis av Rana	5.5%	2	0
New Self-Government	Jógvan Skorheim	4.1%	2	+1
This lists parties that won seats. See the complete results below.
Prime Minister before	Prime Minister
Kaj Leo Johannesen; Union	Aksel V. Johannesen; Social Democratic

General elections were held in the Faroe Islands on 1 September 2015. Elections for the Danish Folketing were held beforehand on 18 June.

== Background ==
On 4 August 2015 the Løgting passed a motion that criticized Prime Minister Kaj Leo Johannesen and former Minister of the Interior Kári P. Højgaard, accusing Johannesen of lying to the Løgting in connection with a 1 million kroner break fee clause in the contract led by the Copenhagen Infrastructure Partners to build a sub-sea tunnel between Eysturoy and Streymoy.

Although Kaj Leo Johannesen had previously told the Løgting that he had no part of the break fee, a judicial inquiry led by Hans Gammeltoft-Hansen (the Danish ombudsman from 1987 until 2012) confirmed in June 2015 that Kaj Leo Johannesen had knowingly misled the Løgting on several occasions, thereby breaking the law. For some time not much happened, the Prime Minister refused to take any action but went on holiday for a month. The speaker of the Løgting refused to assemble parliament, which had no scheduled meeting before 29 July 2015.

On 29 July Kaj Leo Johannesen gave his annual Ólavsøka speech to the Løgting, ending it by calling general elections. A week later on 4 August, the Løgting assembled to discuss the Johannesen's speech, as the law requires. All 33 members of the Løgting voted yes, including Højgaard. Republic and Progress then demanded a vote of no confidence in Kaj Leo Johannesen, in which 14 MPs voted for the motion, 9 against it and 10 cast blank votes, short of the majority of 17 required to pass the motion. Only 9 of 20 MPs from Kaj Leo Johannesen's coalition chose to back him and voted against the motion, including six from his own party, the Speaker Jógvan á Lakjuni from the People's Party and the two MPs from the Centre Party. However, three Union Party MPs cast blank votes, including Deputy Chairman Bárður Nielsen, whilst People's Party chairman Jákup Mikkelsen voted for the motion.

Kaj Leo Johannesen maintains that he did not lie, but only gave incorrect information to the Løgting.

== Electoral system ==
The 33 members of the Løgting were elected by open list proportional representation in a single nationwide constituency with an electoral threshold of 1/33 of votes (~3.03%). Seats were allocated using the d'Hondt method.

== Opinion polls ==
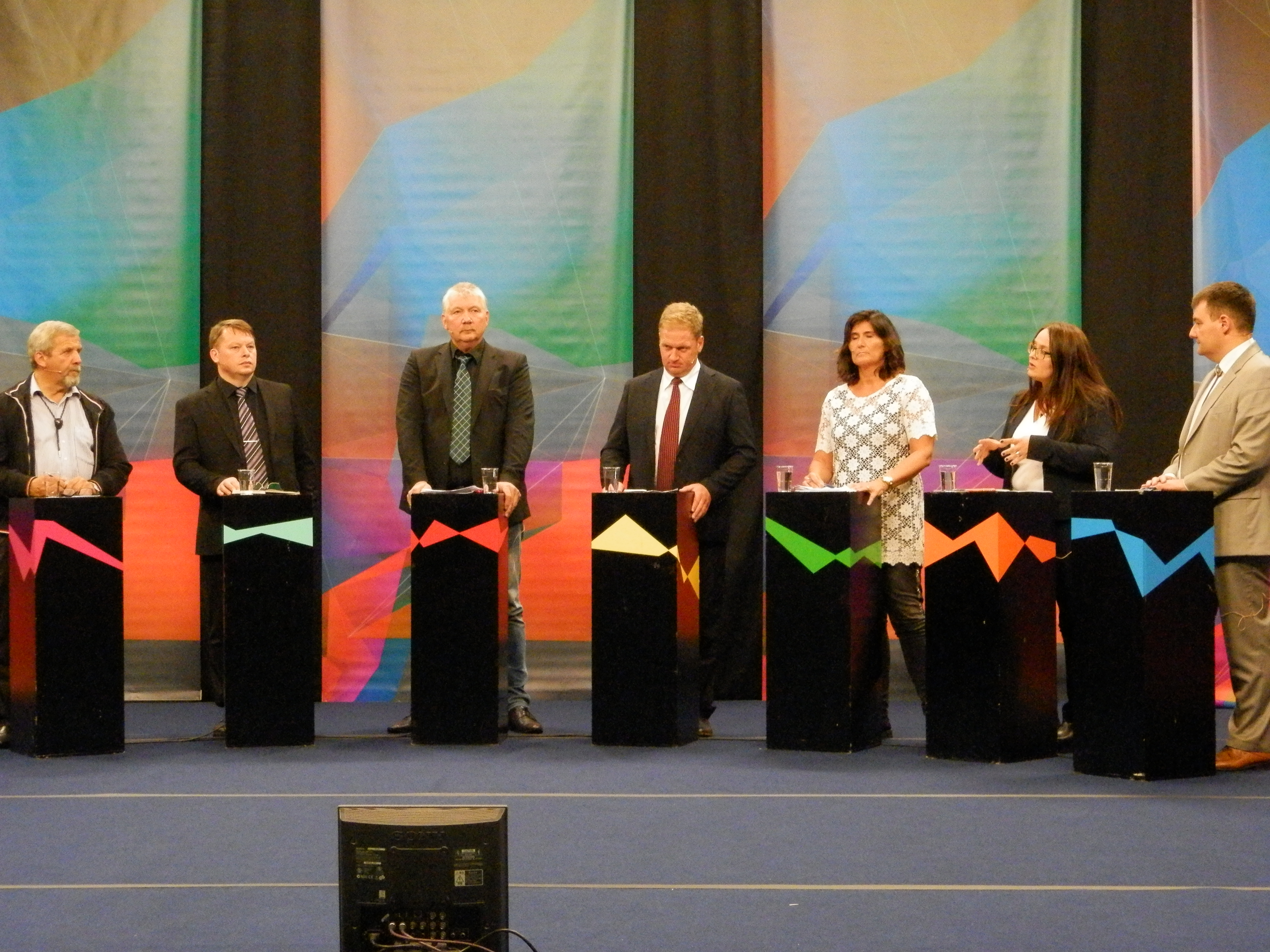
Hustings in Trongisvágur on 25 August 2015; from left to right: Kári P. Højgaard (D), Jákup Suni Lauritsen (H), Kristin Michelsen (C), Páll á Reynatúgvu (E), Elsebeth Mercedis Gunnleygsdóttur (A), Hanna Jensen (F) and Magni Laksáfoss (B).

The ruling centre-right coalition led by Johannesen was consistently behind in the polls, while the Social Democrats led by Aksel Johannesen were well ahead. However, polls closer to election day showed a tightening race.

=== Vote ===
Date	Source	PP	UP	SP	NS	R	P	CP
31 August 2015	Gallup	18.2%	19.0%	22.9%	3.1%	19.4%	10.6%	6.8%
31 August 2015	Fynd	20.4%	19.2%	19.3%	5.9%	16.5%	11.2%	7.4%
28 August 2015	Fynd	20.8%	19.6%	21.3%	4.9%	18.0%	8.7%	6.7%
20 August 2015	Fynd	18.3%	21.1%	21.3%	4.2%	17.6%	11.7%	5.9%
6 August 2015	Fynd	18.6%	19.0%	23.0%	2.9%	20.2%	11.6%	4.7%
22 April 2015	Fynd	16.2%	19.7%	25.8%	4.3%	18.2%	11.0%	4.8%
6 March 2015	Fynd	18.9%	18.1%	26.5%	3.1%	21.3%	6.1%	5.8%
5 December 2014	Gallup	18.9%	17.4%	28.3%	3.2%	21.3%	5.4%	5.5%
6 November 2014	Fynd	20.1%	22.4%	25.8%	2.4%	21.1%	3.3%	4.8%
5–11 September 2013	Gallup	17.2%	22.1%	21.7%	4.5%	23.6%	5.7%	5.2%
2011 election results		22.5%	24.7%	17.7%	4.2%	18.3%	6.3%	6.2%

=== Seats ===
Date	Source	PP	UP	SP	NS	R	P	CP
31 August 2015	Gallup	6	6	8	1	6	4	2
31 August 2015	Fynd	7	6	6	2	5	4	3
28 August 2015	Fynd	7	6	7	2	6	3	2
20 August 2015	Fynd	6	7	7	1	6	4	2
6 August 2015	Fynd	6	6	8	0	7	4	2
20–21 April 2015	Fynd	5	6	9	1	6	4	2
6 March 2015	Fynd	6	6	9	1	7	2	2
5 December 2014	Gallup	6	6	9	1	7	2	2
6 November 2014	Fynd	7	7	9	0	7	1	2
5–11 September 2013	Gallup	6	7	7	1	8	2	2
2011 election results		8	8	6	1	6	2	2

== Results ==
The opposition parties made a major comeback from the 2011 elections, with the Social Democratic Party and Republic gaining two and one seats respectively. Progress regained its second seat, which it lost in 2011 when Janus Rein left the party. Despite a small reduction in their vote share, New Self-Government gained one seat.

Party	Votes	%	Seats	+/–
Social Democratic Party	8,093	25.09	8	+2
Republic	6,691	20.74	7	+1
People's Party	6,102	18.92	6	–2
Union Party	6,046	18.74	6	–2
Progress	2,241	6.95	2	0
Centre Party	1,779	5.52	2	0
Self-Government	1,305	4.05	2	+1
Total	32,257	100.00	33	0
Valid votes	32,257	99.64		
Invalid/blank votes	117	0.36		
Total votes	32,374	100.00		
Registered voters/turnout	36,458	88.80		
Source: KVF

Of the 117 void votes, 76 were blank and 41 invalid.

=== By region and polling district ===
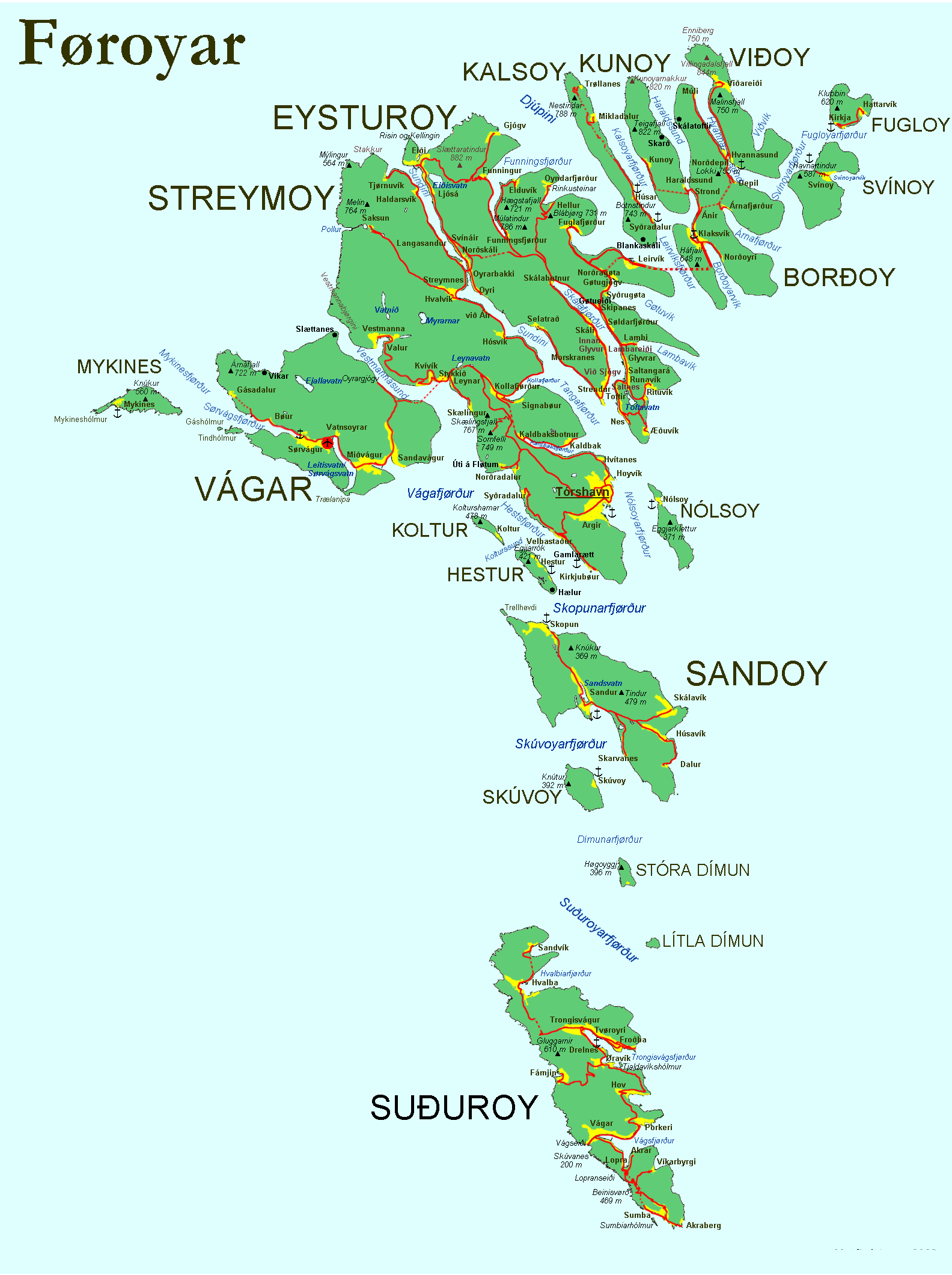
Towns and settlements on the Faroes, the polling places Fossanes and Giljanes are schools and therefore not on the map.

There were 58 polling districts (down from 60 in 2011), of which 56 were towns and two (Giljanes and Fossanes) were schools. Giljanes was one of the two polling places on the western island of Vágar, while Fossanes is located on the Norðoyar. There were two polling places in the capital area; Tórshavn, which includes the suburbs of Hvítanes and Hoyvík, and the southern suburb Argir. The Vágar region includes the neighbouring island Mykines and the Sandoy region includes Skúvoy, while the rest of Streymoy includes the polling places on the islets Nólsoy and Hestur.

Area	People's Party		Union Party		Social Democratic Party		New Self-Government		Republic		Progress		Centre Party	
Area	Votes	%	Votes	%	Votes	%	Votes	%	Votes	%	Votes	%	Votes	%
National	6,102	18.9	6,046	18.7	8,093	25.1	1,305	4.1	6,691	20.7	2,241	7.0	1,779	5.5
Capital Area	1,655	13.5	1,769	14.4	3,322	27.0	248	2.0	3,179	25.8	1,451	11.8	678	5.5
Rest of Streymoy	338	15.8	372	17.3	591	27.6	65	3.0	490	22.8	192	9.0	97	4.5
Eysturoy	1,462	18.5	2,147	27.2	1,461	18.5	581	7.4	1,305	16.5	403	5.1	537	6.8
Klaksvík	1,040	32.4	499	15.6	705	22.0	276	8.6	456	14.2	66	2.1	166	5.2
Rest of Norðoyar	285	38.2	93	12.4	135	18.1	43	5.8	114	15.3	22	2.9	55	7.4
Suðuroy	566	18.1	480	15.4	1,335	42.7	29	0.9	574	18.4	26	0.8	116	3.7
Vágar	521	26.6	460	23.5	440	22.5	56	2.9	317	16.2	63	3.2	102	5.2
Sandoy	235	26.9	226	25.9	104	11.9	7	0.8	256	29.3	18	2.1	28	3.2
Argir	195	14.6	207	15.5	366	27.5	26	2.0	306	23.0	153	11.5	80	6.0
Árnafjørður	15	41.7	4	11.1	2	5.6	1	2.8	10	27.8	0	0.0	4	11.1
Dalur	3	11.1	2	7.4	20	74.1	0	0.0	2	7.4	0	0.0	0	0.0
Eiði	73	16.2	86	19.1	80	17.8	22	4.9	129	28.7	25	5.6	35	7.8
Elduvík	3	23.1	3	23.1	6	46.2	0	0.0	1	7.7	0	0.0	0	0.0
Fámjin	8	10.7	19	25.3	29	38.7	0	0.0	19	25.3	0	0.0	0	0.0
Fossanes	91	35.4	37	14.4	48	18.7	10	3.9	38	14.8	3	1.2	30	11.7
Fuglafjørður	211	21.4	220	22.3	260	26.3	18	1.8	204	20.7	45	4.6	29	2.9
Funningsfjørður	9	20.5	2	4.5	9	20.5	2	4.5	12	27.3	5	11.4	5	11.4
Funningur	7	16.7	6	14.3	10	23.8	7	16.7	7	16.7	3	7.1	2	4.8
Giljanes	328	25.9	291	23.0	280	22.2	42	3.3	220	17.4	42	3.3	61	4.8
Gjógv	8	29.6	6	22.2	2	7.4	0	0.0	8	29.6	0	0.0	3	11.1
Gøta	213	28.9	124	16.8	136	18.5	43	5.8	117	15.9	63	8.5	41	5.6
Haldórsvík	7	5.6	19	15.2	56	44.8	12	9.6	13	10.4	15	12.0	3	2.4
Haraldssund	7	15.9	5	11.4	7	15.9	2	4.5	18	40.9	5	11.4	0	0.0
Hattarvík	6	50.0	0	0.0	2	16.7	1	8.3	3	25.0	0	0.0	0	0.0
Hellurnar	0	0.0	4	30.8	5	38.5	1	7.7	3	23.1	0	0.0	0	0.0
Hestur	1	6.7	3	20.0	6	40.0	0	0.0	4	26.7	0	0.0	1	6.7
Hósvík	21	10.1	38	18.4	67	32.4	8	3.9	39	18.8	21	10.1	13	6.3
Hov	8	11.3	14	19.7	38	53.5	2	2.8	7	9.9	1	1.4	1	1.4
Húsar	1	2.9	10	29.4	14	41.2	1	2.9	4	11.8	4	11.8	0	0.0
Húsavík	33	55.0	13	21.7	5	8.3	0	0.0	7	11.7	2	3.3	0	0.0
Hvalba	145	34.4	76	18.1	122	29.0	3	0.7	53	12.6	4	1.0	18	4.3
Hvalvík	65	21.2	72	23.5	75	24.5	9	2.9	48	15.7	20	6.5	17	5.6
Kaldbak	42	27.1	13	8.4	21	13.5	9	5.8	41	26.5	11	7.1	18	11.6
Kirkja	4	17.4	6	26.1	1	4.3	10	43.5	1	4.3	0	0.0	1	4.3
Kollafjørður	132	21.7	111	18.2	168	27.6	11	1.8	122	20.0	41	6.7	24	3.9
Kunoy	3	6.4	4	8.5	17	36.2	5	10.6	15	31.9	1	2.1	2	4.3
Kvívík	31	8.9	76	21.8	103	29.5	10	2.9	87	24.9	34	9.7	8	2.3
Leirvík	125	22.4	110	19.7	120	21.5	19	3.4	110	19.7	37	6.6	37	6.6
Lopra	21	29.6	7	9.9	19	26.8	0	0.0	15	21.1	1	1.4	8	11.3
Mikladalur	11	34.4	0	0.0	4	12.5	2	6.3	12	37.5	1	3.1	2	6.3
Mykines	2	18.2	4	36.4	1	9.1	1	9.1	3	27.3	0	0.0	0	0.0
Nólsoy	19	13.6	14	10.0	39	27.9	1	0.7	38	27.1	23	16.4	6	4.3
Oyndarfjørður	12	11.4	28	26.7	23	21.9	8	7.6	21	20.0	8	7.6	5	4.8
Oyrarbakki	42	11.5	126	34.6	91	25.0	16	4.4	56	15.4	29	8.0	4	1.1
Porkeri	43	19.6	28	12.8	101	46.1	2	0.9	22	10.0	1	0.5	22	10.0
Runavík	355	19.5	528	29.1	215	11.8	306	16.9	159	8.8	58	3.2	195	10.7
Sandur	146	40.1	29	8.0	33	9.1	2	0.5	143	39.3	6	1.6	5	1.4
Sandvík	12	18.2	8	12.1	26	39.4	1	1.5	17	25.8	2	3.0	0	0.0
Skálabotnur	3	4.6	7	10.8	14	21.5	1	1.5	29	44.6	1	1.5	10	15.4
Skálavík	21	22.3	22	23.4	20	21.3	1	1.1	27	28.7	2	2.1	1	1.1
Skáli	58	13.5	119	27.7	104	24.2	36	8.4	64	14.9	15	3.5	34	7.9
Skopun	28	9.5	146	49.3	24	8.1	3	1.0	67	22.6	6	2.0	22	7.4
Skúvoy	4	12.1	14	42.4	2	6.1	1	3.0	10	30.3	2	6.1	0	0.0
Strendur	74	12.1	224	36.5	110	17.9	43	7.0	73	11.9	22	3.6	68	11.1
Sumba	17	10.0	20	11.8	70	41.2	5	2.9	56	32.9	0	0.0	2	1.2
Svínoy	8	38.1	3	14.3	2	9.5	1	4.8	6	28.6	0	0.0	1	4.8
Sørvágur	191	27.9	165	24.1	159	23.2	13	1.9	94	13.7	21	3.1	41	6.0
Tjørnuvík	2	3.9	6	11.8	23	45.1	4	7.8	11	21.6	3	5.9	2	3.9
Toftir	123	15.5	352	44.5	95	12.0	53	6.7	89	11.3	31	3.9	48	6.1
Tórshavn	1,460	13.3	1,562	14.2	2,956	26.9	222	2.0	2,873	26.2	1,298	11.8	598	5.5
Tvøroyri	168	14.5	111	9.6	669	57.6	12	1.0	150	12.9	12	1.0	39	3.4
Vágur	144	16.5	197	22.6	261	29.9	4	0.5	235	26.9	5	0.6	25	3.0
Velbastaður	18	9.6	20	10.6	33	17.6	1	0.5	87	46.3	24	12.8	5	2.7
Vestmanna	146	17.4	202	24.0	181	21.5	6	0.7	223	26.5	61	7.3	21	2.5
Viðareiði	139	57.7	24	10.0	38	15.8	10	4.1	7	2.9	8	3.3	15	6.2
Source: KVF

== See also ==
- List of members of the Løgting, 2015–19
