= Annita á Fríðriksmørk =

Faroese politician and teacher

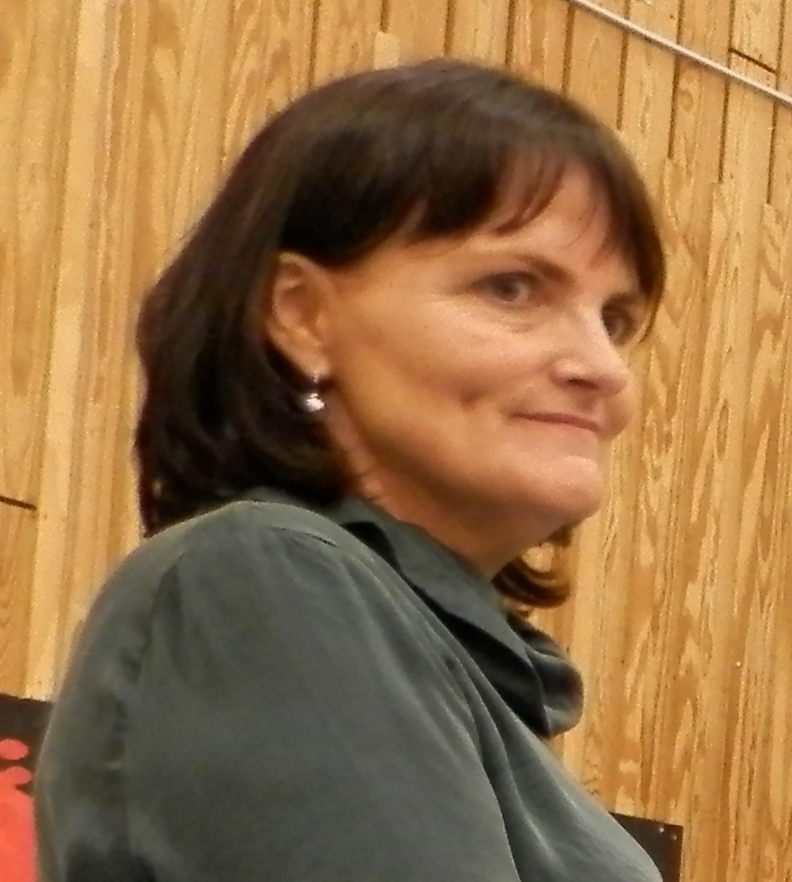
- Annita á Fríðriksmørk in 2015

Member of Parliament
- In office 1998–2011
- Incumbent
- Assumed office 2015

Personal details
- Born: 27 July 1968 (age 58) Tórshavn, Faroe Islands
- Party: Republic (Tjóðveldi)

Annita á Fríðriksmørk (born 27 July 1968 in Tórshavn) is a Faroese politician and teacher. She is a member of Republic (Tjóðveldi).

== Background ==
Annita á Fríðriksmørk grew up in Strendur on the island Eysturoy. She became a school teacher from Føroya Læraraskúli in 1992. She has worked as a teacher since 1992 in the Faroe Islands and in Denmark.

== Political career ==
Annita á Fríðriksmørk was elected for the Faroese parliament for the first time in 1998. She was minister of culture in the second government of Anfinn Kallsberg from 17 September to 5 December 2003.

In 2008 she was a temporary member of the Danish Folketing from 9 September to 24 October as a substitute for Høgni Hoydal, who was minister at that time and therefore took leave from the Folketing.

At the general elections of the Faroe Islands in 2015 she was elected again. She became chairperson for the standing committee of foreign affairs.
