= List of International Union of Socialist Youth member organisations =

This is a list of member organisations of the International Union of Socialist Youth, listed by region.

== Africa ==
- Angola — Juventude do Partido - MPLA (MPLA Youth)
- Benin — Jeunesse Parti Social Democrate (Youth of Social Democratic Party)
- Burkina Faso — Jeunesse du Parti pour la Democratie et le Progresse/Parti Socialiste (Youth of the Party for Democracy and Progress/Socialist Party)
- Cameroon — Jeunesse du Front Social Democratique (Social Democratic Front Youth)
- Cape Verde — Juventude do Partido Africano da Independencia de Cabo Verde (Youth of PAICV)
- Equatorial Guinea — Convergencia para la Democracia Social (Youth of the Convergence for Social Democracy)
- Gabon — Union des Jeunesses Joseph Rendjambe (Joseph Rendjambe Youth League)
- Mali — Jeunesse ADEMA/Parti Africaine pour la Solidarité et la Justice (Youth of ADEMA/African Party for Solidarity and Justice)
- Mali — Union de la Jeunesse Rassemblement Pour le Mali (Rally for Mali Youth League)
- Morocco — Chabiba Ittihadia (Ittihadia Youth)
- Mozambique — Organizaçao da Juventude Moçambicana (Mozambican Youth Organization/FRELIMO Youth)
- Niger — Organisation de Jeunesse du Taraya (Youth Organization of Taraya)
- Sahrawi Republic - Sahrawi Youth Union (UJSARIO)
- Senegal — Mouvement National des Jeunesses Socialistes (National Movement of Socialist Youth)
- South Africa — African National Congress Youth League
- Swaziland — Swaziland Youth Congress
- Tanzania — Umoja wa Vijana wa Chama Cha Mapinduzi (CCM Youth League)
- Uganda — Uganda Young Democrats (UYD)

== Americas ==
- Argentina — Argentine Socialist Youth
- Argentina — Franja Morada
- Barbados — League of Young Socialists of the Barbados Labour Party
- Bolivia — Juventud del Movimiento Sin Miedo (Youth of the Without Fear Movement)
- Brazil — Juventude Socialista-PDT (Socialist Youth-PDT)
- Canada — New Democratic Youth of Canada
- Chile — Juventud del Partido por la Democracia (Youth of the Party for Democracy)
- Chile — Juventud Radical de Chile (Radical Youth of Chile)
- Chile — Juventud Socialista de Chile (Socialist Youth of Chile)
- Colombia — Juventudes Liberales de Colombia (Liberal Youth of Colombia)
- Costa Rica — Juventud Liberacionista (Liberationist Youth)
- Dominican Republic — Juventud Revolucionaria Dominicana (Dominican Revolutionary Youth)
- Ecuador — Juventud de Izquierda Democrática (Democratic Left Youth)
- Honduras — Juventud Pinuista (Pinuist Youth)
- Jamaica — People's National Party Youth Organisation
- Mexico — Juventud Demócrata, PRD (Democratic Youth, PRD)
- Panama — Frente de la Juventud del PRD (PRD Youth Front)
- Paraguay — Juventud Revolucionaria Febrerista (Febrerist Revolutionary Youth)
- Paraguay - Juventud País Solidario (Solidarity Country Youth)
- Peru — Juventud Aprista Peruana (Peruvian Aprista Youth)
- Puerto Rico — Juventud del PIP (PIP Youth)
- United States - Young Democratic Socialists of America
- Uruguay — Juventud Nuevo Espacio (New Space Youth)
- Uruguay — Juventud Socialista del Uruguay (Socialist Youth of Uruguay)
- Venezuela — Juventud de Acción Democrática (Youth of Democratic Action)
- Venezuela — Juventud del Movimiento al Socialismo (Youth of the Movement for Socialism)

== Asia-Pacific ==
- Bhutan — Youth Organisation of Bhutan
- Burma — Youth for a New Society
- Indonesia — Pergerakan Indonesia
- Japan — Social Democratic Party of Japan - Youth Bureau
- Malaysia — Democratic Action Party Socialist Youth
- Mongolia — Mongolian Democratic Socialist Youth Union
- Nepal — Nepal Students Union
- Nepal — Nepal Tarun Dal
- New Zealand — New Zealand Young Labour
- Philippines — Akbayan Youth
- Thailand — Young Progressives for Social Democracy Movement, Thailand-YPD

== Europe ==
- Albania — Forumi i Rinisë Eurosocialiste të Shqipërisë (Eurosocialist Youth Forum of Albania)
- Albania — Rinisë Socialdemokrate (Social Democratic Youth of Albania)
- Armenia — Armenian Youth Federation
- Austria — Sozialistische Jugend Österreich (Socialist Youth Austria)
- Austria — Verband Sozialistischer StudentInnen Österreichs (Socialist Students of Austria)
- Azerbaijan — Social Democratic Youth Organisation of Azerbaijan
- Belarus — MSD - Maladaja Hramada (Youth Social Democrats)
- Belgium — Jongsocialisten (Young Socialists)
- Belgium — Young Socialists Movement (Youth Socialists Movement)
- Bosnia and Herzegovina — Forum mladih SDP BiH (SDP Youth Forum)
- Bulgaria — Mladezhko Obedinenie v BSP (Bulgarian Socialist Party's Youth Union)
- Bulgaria — Evropejska Ljava Mladezhka Alternativa (European Left Youth Alternative)
- Croatia — Forum mladih SDP (SDP Youth Forum)
- Croatia — Socijaldemokratska studentska unija Hrvatske (SSU) (Social Democratic Student Union)
- Cyprus — Neolea Sosialdimokraton (Social Democratic Youth)
- Czech Republic — Mladí sociální demokraté (Youth Social Democrats)
- Denmark — Danmarks Socialdemokratiske Ungdom (Social Democratic Youth of Denmark)
- Estonia — Estonian Social Democratic Youth
- Faroe Islands — Sosialistisk Ung (Social Democratic Youth of the Faroe Islands)
- Finland — Sosialdemokraattiset Opiskelijat (Social Democratic Students)
- Finland — Sosialdemokraattiset Nuoret (Social Democratic Youth)
- France — Mouvement des jeunes socialistes (France) (Young Socialists Movement)
- Georgia — Young Socialists of Georgia
- Germany — Jusos in der SPD (Young Socialists in the SPD)
- Germany — Sozialistische Jugend Deutschlands – Die Falken (Socialist Youth of Germany – Falcons)
- Greece — Neolaia PASOK (PASOK Youth)
- Greenland — Siumut Youth
- Hungary — Societas - Új Mozgalom (Societas - New Movement)
- Iceland — Ungt jafnaðarfólk
- Ireland — Labour Youth
- Italy — Federazione dei Giovani Socialisti (Federation of Young Socialists)
- Italy — Giovani Democratici (Young Democrats)
- Latvia — Restart.lv
- Lithuania — Lietuvos socialdemokratinio jaunimo sąjunga (Lithuanian Social Democratic Youth Union)
- Luxembourg — Jeunesses Socialistes Luxembourgeoises (Luxembourg Socialist Youths)
- Macedonia — Socijaldemokratskata mladina na Makedonija (Social Democratic Youth of Macedonia)
- Malta — Labour Youths
- Montenegro — Socijaldemokratska omladina Crne Gore (Social Democratic Youth of Montenegro)
- Moldova — Democratic Youth
- Netherlands — Jonge Socialisten (Young Socialists in the PvdA)
- Norway — Arbeidernes Ungdoms Fylking (Worker's Youth League)
- Poland — Federacja Młodych Socjaldemokratów (Social Democratic Youth Federation)
- Poland — Federacja Młodych Unii Pracy (Union of Labour Youth Federation)
- Portugal — Juventude Socialista (Socialist Youth)
- Romania — Tineretul Social Democrat (Social Democratic Youth)
- Russia — Российский социал-демократический союз молодёжи (Russian Social Democratic Union of Youth)
- San Marino — Area Giovani Socialisti Sammarinesi (Area Socialist Youth of San Marino)
- Serbia — Demokratska omladina (Democratic Youth)
- Serbia — Socijaldemokratska omladina (Social Democratic Youth)
- Slovakia — Mladí sociálni demokrati (Youth Social Democrats)
- Slovenia — Mladi forum Socialnih Demokratov (Young Forum of Social Democrats)
- Spain — Juventudes Socialistas de España (Socialist Youth of Spain)
- Spain — Joventut Socialista de Catalunya (Socialist Youth of Catalonia)
- Sweden — Socialdemokratiska Studentförbundet (Social Democratic Students of Sweden)
- Sweden — Sveriges Socialdemokratiska Ungdomsförbund (Social Democratic Youth League of Sweden)
- Switzerland — JungsozialistInnen Schweiz / Jeunesse socialiste suisse / Gioventù Socialista Svizzera (Young Socialists Switzerland)
- Ukraine — Socialist Youth Union (Ukraine)
- Turkey — CHP Gençlik Kolları (CHP Youth)
- United Kingdom — Labour Students
- United Kingdom — Young Labour

== Middle East ==
- Palestinian Authority — Shabibet Fateh (Fatah Youth)
- Israel — Mishmeret Tse'irah shel Mifleget Ha'Avoda (Young Guard of the Labour Party)
- Israel — Young Meretz, Meretz Youth
- Iran — Lawan (Democratic Youth Union of Iranian Kurdistan)
- Iraq — Kurdish Youth and Freedom Organisation
- Iraq — Kurdistan Students Association
- Lebanon — Progressive Youth Organization (Lebanon)

== Observers ==
- Albania — Youth Movement for Integration
- Bolivia — Juventud Movimiento Al Socialismo (Youth of the Movement for Socialism)
- Botswana — Botswana National Front Youth League
- Burma — All Burma Students League
- Cyprus — AGONAS (Democratic Movement of Cypriot Students)
- Gambia — Youth of the United Democratic Party
- Guinea-Bissau — Juventude Africana Amilcar Cabral (African Youth Amilcar Cabral)
- Iran — Democratic Students Union of Iranian Kurdistan
- Iran — DYUEK (Democratic Youth Union of East Kurdistan)
- United Kingdom — Northern Ireland — SDLP Youth
- Palestinian Authority — General Union of Palestine Students
- Philippines — Student Council Alliance of Philippines
- Russia — Молодые социалисты России (Young Socialists of Russia)
- Serbia — Lige Socijaldemokratske Vojvođanske Omladine (League of Social Democratic Youth of Vojvodina)
- South Korea - Youth Justice Party of Korea
- Taiwan — Taiwan Labour Front
- Tibet — Tibetan Youth Congress
- Timor-Leste — Youth and Students' Organization of Timor-Leste
- Togo — Convention Démocratique des Peuples Africains (Democratic Convention of African Peoples)
- Ukraine — Social Democratic Perspective
