= Socialist Youth =

Socialist Youth or Socialist Youth League may refer to:

- Communist Youth League of China, known as the Socialist Youth League 1922–1925
- International Union of Socialist Youth
- Scottish Socialist Youth
- Socialist German Workers Youth
- Socialist Workers Youth of Saarland
- Socialist Youth (Brazil), an organization of the Brazilian Communist Party
- Socialist Youth (Chile)
- Socialist Youth (Croatia)
- Socialist Youth (Faroe Islands)
- Socialist Youth (Ireland)
- Socialist Youth (Norway)
- Socialist Youth (Portugal)
- Socialist Youth Austria
- Socialist Youth League (Denmark, 1935)
- Socialist Youth League (Sweden)
- Socialist Youth League (United States)
- Socialist Youth League of Germany
- Socialist Youth of Spain
- Socialist Youth Union (Bulgaria)
- Unified Socialist Youth
- Workers' Youth League (Norway)
- Young European Socialists, an association of organizations in the European Union
- Socialist Youth, the newspaper of the British Labour Party Young Socialists

== See also ==
- Social Democratic Youth (disambiguation)
- Young People's Socialist League (1907)
- Young People's Socialist League (Socialist Party USA)
- Young Socialists (disambiguation)
- Youth League (disambiguation)
