= Young Social Democrats =

Young Social Democrats may refer to:

- Young Social Democrats (Czech Republic), a social democratic youth organization in the Czech Republic
- Young Social Democrats (Estonia), the youth wing of the Social Democratic Party in Estonia
- Young Social Democrats (Slovakia), a social democratic youth organization in Slovakia
- Young Social Democrats, the youth wing of the Social Democrats, USA in the United States
- Young Social Democrats, the youth wing of the Social Democratic Party in the United Kingdom

== See also ==
- Social Democratic Youth (disambiguation)
- Young Socialists (disambiguation)
- International Union of Socialist Youth
