= Nordic Youth Council =

Forum organization of the Nordic Council

- Ungdommens Nordiske Råd
- Abbreviation: UNR
- Formation: 1971
- Headquarters: Topeliusgatan 20
- Location: Helsinki, Finland
- Members: 8 members: Denmark; Faroe Islands; Finland; Greenland; Iceland; Norway; Sweden; Åland Islands
- President: Alexander Winge
- Policy Advisor: Lina Frostdahl
- Parent organization: Nordic Council
- Website: Unginorden.org

The Nordic Youth Council (Scandinavian: Ungdommens Nordiske Råd), abbreviated UNR, is a forum organization of the Nordic Council. It consists of the member countries' youth wing parties.

== History ==
The youth wing parties of the Nordic Council have, since the council's foundation in 1952, held independent seminars before the Nordic Council's sessions. The purpose of the seminar was to discuss the subjects on the council's agenda.

In the late 1960s it was discussed to create an independent organization for the youth wing parties. A trial session was held in Stockholm in 1971. Creating the UNR as an independent organization was dismissed, but the yearly seminars continued. During the 1970s and 1980s, UNR continued with yearly seminars. UNR was first able to influence the Nordic Council's session in 1987, where they were given opportunity to present the results from the seminar.

At the Nordic Council's session in 2002 in Espoo, UNR finally became an independent permanent organization. The organization was to have a president and a presidium. The organization is administered from Finland.

== Members ==
The youth wing parties of the member states are members of the UNR. Additionally a number of non-affiliated organizations hold observer status.

This list shows all the umbrella organizations that are members of UNR.

- GUN - Grön Ungdom i Norden
- FNSU - Förbundet Nordens Socialdemokratiske Ungdom
- KDUN - Kristdemokratisk Ungdom i Norden
- NCF - Nordiska Centerungdomens Förbund
- NFU - Nordisk Friheds Ungdom
- NLU - Nordens Liberale Ungdom
- NUU - Nordisk Ungkonservativ Union
- SNUS - Sammanslutningen för Nordiska Unga Socialliberaler
- SUN - Socialistisk Ungdom i Norden

The following list shows the umbrella organization that hold observer status in UNR.

- FNUF - Föreningarna Nordens Ungdomsförbund

== Presidents ==
- 2003: Knud Edmund Berthelsen, Norway (Unge Venstre, NLRU)
- 2004: Magnus Öster, Finland (Svensk Ungdom, NCF)
- 2005: Andrés Jónsson, Iceland (Ungir Jafnaðarmenn, FNSU)
- 2006: Lotta Backlund, Finland (Kokoomusnuoret, NUU)
- 2007: Tytti Seppänen, Finland (Suomen Keskustanuoret, NCF)
- 2008-2009: Lisbeth Sejer Gøtzsche, Denmark (Konservativ Ungdom, NUU)
- 2010-2011: Minna Lindberg, Finland (Svensk Ungdom, NCF)
- 2012: Erik Winther Paisley, Denmark (Konservativ Ungdom, NUU)
- 2013: Silja Borgarsdóttir Sandelin, Finland (Svensk Ungdom, NCF)
- 2014: Jakob Esmann, Denmark (Danmarks Socialdemokratiske Ungdom, FNSU)
- 2015: Kai Alajoki, Finland (Demarinuoret, FNSU)
- 2016: Anna Abrahamsson, Finland (Svensk Ungdom, NCF)
- 2017: Espen Krogh, Denmark (Konservativ Ungdom, NUU)
- 2018: Kati Systä, Finland (Vihreät Nuoret, GUN)
- 2019: Barbara Gaardlykke Apol, Faroe Islands (Sosialistiskt Ungmannafelag, FNSU)
- 2020: Nicholas Kujala, Finland (Svensk Ungdom, NCF)
- 2021: Aldís Mjöll Geirsdóttir, Iceland (Ungir Jafnaðarmenn, FNSU)
- 2022: Rasmus Jungersen Emborg, Danmark (Danmarks Socialdemokratiske Ungdom, FNSU)
- 2023: Rasmus Jungersen Emborg, Denmark (Danmarks Socialdemokratiske Ungdom, FNSU)
- 2024: Anders P. Hansen, Denmark (Liberal Alliances Ungdom, NLU)
- 2025: Alexander Winge, Sweden (Sveriges Socialdemokratiska Ungdomsförbund, FNSU)
