= Frit Forum =

Student organization

Frit Forum - Social Democratic Students of Denmark
- Founded: 1943
- Ideology: Social democracy Democratic socialism
- Mother party: Danish Social Democrats
- International affiliation: International Union of Socialist Youth, IUSY
- European affiliation: Young European Socialists, ECOSY

Frit Forum - Social Democratic Students of Denmark (Danish: Frit Forum – socialdemokratiske studerende, or just Frit Forum) is the student organization of the Danish Social Democrats.

It was established in 1943 during the Nazi occupation of Denmark as a means of reaching out to the growing number of students in the labour movement. Since then, it has had a decisive impact on Danish politics, fostering many leaders and influential Social Democrats.

Former PES-president Poul Nyrup Rasmussen, former Danish frontrunner to the European Parliament Dan Jørgensen, and former Minister of Finance Mogens Lykketoft began their paths in Frit Forum. It compares to the Labour Students in the UK.

After peaking in the 1950s and 1960s, it was struck by the radicalization of the political left among Danish students. As in Germany and Sweden, several members left for radical movements on the left, but in contrast to the Studentersamfundet or the Studenterforeningen, Frit Forum survived, primarily as a result of being merged with the social democratic youth organization DSU in 1973.

In 2003, this caused a conflict within the organization, as the DSU felt Frit Forum was not fulfilling its obligations at the universities. Instead, they threatened to launch a new social democratic Student network, called SSN. Following devastating internal disputes, it was saved by the president of the Danish Social Democrats, Mogens Lykketoft, himself being former president of Frit Forum.

Since then, the climate between the two organizations has bettered. Over the years, Frit Forum has held meetings and conferences with both the Labour Students (England) and S-studenter (Sweden).

== See also ==
- Politics of Denmark
- List of political parties in Denmark
- Social Democratic Youth of Denmark
