= Young Socialists =

Young Socialists has been the name of more than one group:

- Young Socialists (Belgium)
- Young Socialists (Croatia)
- Young Socialists (Flanders)
- Young Socialists (France)
- Young Socialists (Germany)
- Young Socialists (Netherlands)
- Young Socialists (Poland)
- Young Socialists (Sweden)
- Young Socialists Switzerland
- Labour Party Young Socialists
- Young Socialists (UK, 1966), affiliated to the Workers Revolutionary Party.
- Young Socialists (US), affiliated to the Socialist Workers Party.

== See also ==
- Young European Socialists (ECOSY)
- International Union of Socialist Youth (IUSY)
- Socialist Youth
- Young People's Socialist League (1907)
- Young People's Socialist League (Socialist Party USA)
