= Social Democratic Youth =

Social Democratic Youth may refer to:

- Social Democratic Youth of Denmark
- Social Democratic Youth (Finland)
- Social Democratic Youth (Lebanon)
- Social Democratic Youth (Mongolia)
- Social Democratic Youth (Iceland)
- Social Democratic Youth (Portugal)
- Social Democratic Youth (Romania)
- Social Democratic Youth (Serbia)
- Swedish Social Democratic Youth League

== See also ==
- Young Social Democrats (disambiguation)
- Socialist Youth (disambiguation)
