= Youth League =

Youth League may refer to any of the following

== Organizations ==
- Youth Leagues (Ceylon), societies of young people, mainly intellectuals, who wanted independence for Sri Lanka
- A-League National Youth League, an Australian national football (soccer) league
- African National Congress Youth League, the youth wing of the African National Congress
- City Youth League, a defunct organization that participated in nonviolent resistance against the government in Rhodesia
- Coalition Party Youth League, the youth wing of National Coalition Party in Finland
- Communist Youth League of China also known as the China Youth League, a youth movement of the People's Republic of China
- ESC Youth League, a shooting competition for national teams created by the European Shooting Confederation
- General Dutch Youth League, a political youth movement in the Netherlands
- Gilette National Youth League, a British rugby league tournament at under-18 level
- Kuomintang Youth League, is a youth group under the Kuomintang
- Left Communist Youth League, the youth organization of the Norwegian Labour Party
- Moderate Youth League, the youth wing of the Swedish Moderate Party
- Muslim Youth League, the youth wing of the Indian Union Muslim League
- National Soccer Youth League, also known as the National Youth League, an Australian national football (soccer) league
- Patriotic Youth League, a youth organisation in Australia
- Radical Youth League, is a frontal organization of the Communist Party of India (Maoist), a Naxalite group in India
- Revolutionary Youth League (Finland), a political youth organization in Finland during the 1980s
- Socialist Youth League of Norway, the youth wing of the Social Democratic Labour Party of Norway
- Socialist Youth League (Sweden), the youth organization of the Swedish Socialist Party
- Somali Youth League, the first political party in Somalia
- SWAPO Party Youth League, the youth wing of the South West Africa People's Organization
- Swedish Social Democratic Youth League, a branch of the Swedish social democratic party
- UEFA Youth League, a European football competition at under-19 level
- West African Youth League, a political organisation founded by I. T. A. Wallace-Johnson in June 1935
- Workers' Youth League (Norway), Norway's biggest political youth organization, affiliated with the Norwegian Labour Party
- Workers' Youth League (Sweden), the youth organization of the Communist Party of Sweden
- League of Youth, the youth organisation of the British Labour Party from 1926 to the 1960s

== Other ==
- The League of Youth, a play by Henrik Ibsen finished in early May 1869

== See also ==
- National Youth League (disambiguation)
- Socialist Youth League (disambiguation)
- Workers' Youth League (disambiguation)
