= Socialist Youth of Northern Rhodesia =

Socialist Youth of Northern Rhodesia was a youth organisation in Northern Rhodesia (present-day Zambia). It was a member of the International Union of Socialist Youth.
