= Nasra Ali =

Swedish Social Democrat politician

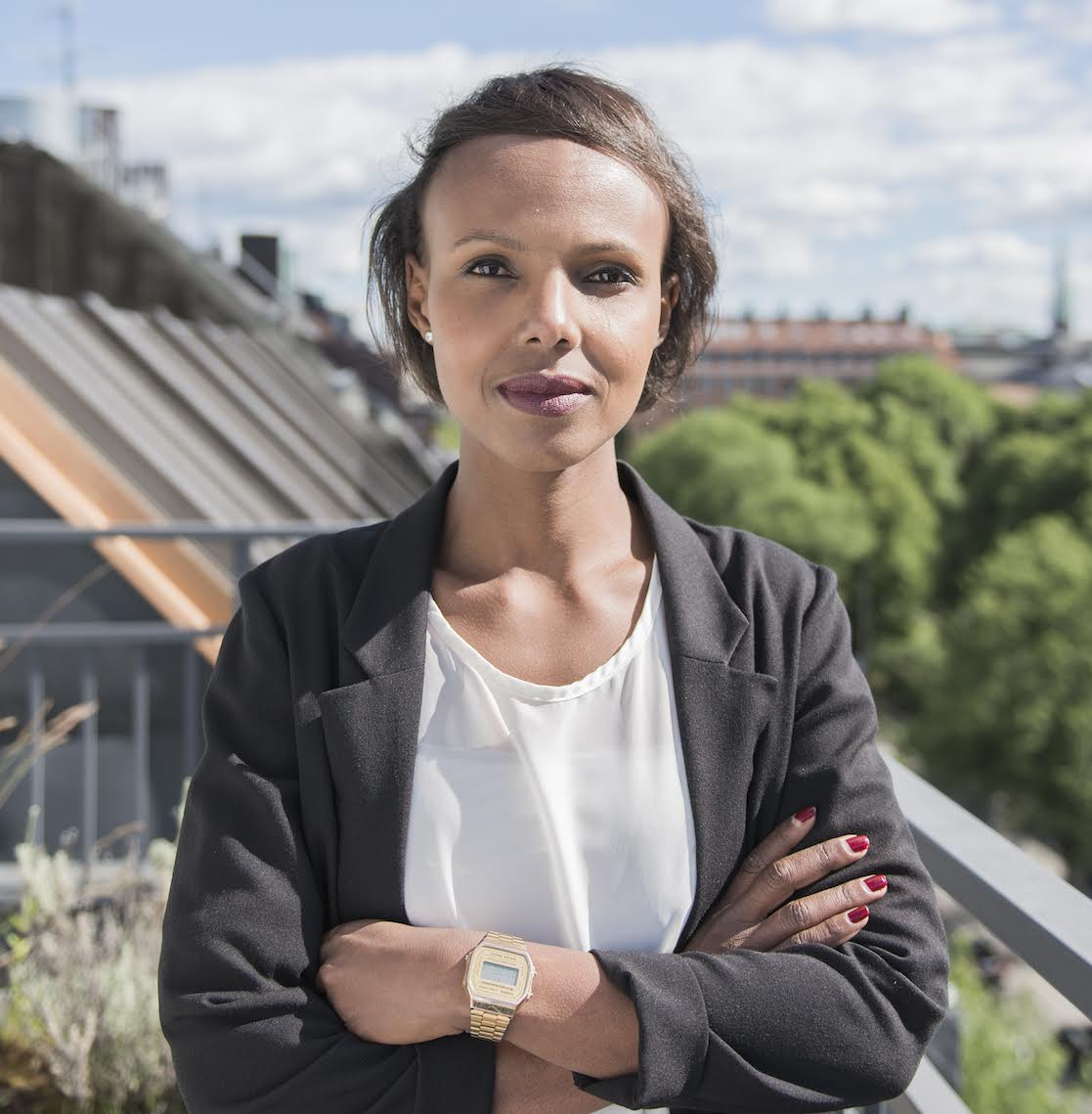
Nasra Ali (2017)

Nasra Ali (born 1988 in Hargeisa, Somalia) is a Swedish Social Democrat politician. She was the Chairman of Social Democratic Students of Sweden (SSF) between 2017 and 2019. Between 2013–2016 she held the post of International Leader of SSF. She was also a member of the bureau of Young European Socialists (2014–2016) and Board Member (2015–2017) of the Olof Palme International Center.

Nasra was raised in Härnösand and Örebro. Before she became Chairman of SSF, she lived in Malmö and studied Political Science in Lund University. She also worked as a political advisor (2015–2017) for the Swedish Social Democratic Party in parliament representing the Stockholm region.
