= Socialist Youth Union =

Socialist Youth Union may refer to:

- Socialist Youth Union (Brazil)
- Socialist Youth Union (Bulgaria)
- Socialist Youth Union (Czechoslovakia)
