= Sejr =

Sejr (Danish pronunciation: [ˈsɑjˀɐ]) is a Nordic name, most prevalent in Denmark. It derives from a Danish word meaning victory, triumph.

Notable people with this name include:

== Surname ==
- Arne Sejr (1922–1998), Danish activist
- Emanuel Sejr (1891–1980), Danish author

== Epithet ==
- Valdemar Sejr (1170–1241), Danish king as Valdemar II of Denmark

== Given name ==
- Sejr Volmer-Sørensen (1914–1982), Danish actor
