= Barbara Gaardlykke Apol =

Danish politician

President of Nordic Youth Council
- In office October 2018 – October 2019

Personal details
- Born: 27 April 1995 (age 30) Tórshavn, Faroe Islands
- Party: Social Democratic Party; Socialist Youth

Barbara Gaardlykke Apol (born 27 April 1995) is Faroese politician and former president of the Nordic Council's organization for youth wing parties, Nordic Youth Council (Danish: Ungdommens Nordiske Råd).

== Political career ==
Between 2015 and 2017 Apol was the leader of the Socialist Youth. In 2019 Apol announced her ambitions of running for the Folketing. She successfully ran in the 2019 election, receiving 392 votes. This was the third-most votes received of the candidates from the Social Democratic Party. Apol became a temporary member of the Folketing in 2020, from March 17 to March 24, substituting for Sjúrður Skaale. She substituted for him again in 2021 from 16 May to 23 May.
