= Democratic Party for a New Society =

Democratic Party for a New Society လူ့ဘောင်သစ်ဒီမိုကရက်တစ်ပါတီ
- Abbreviation: DPNS
- Chairman: Aung Moe Zaw
- Secretary-General: Ngwe Lin
- Vice-Chairperson: Myint Naing
- Founded: 14 October 1988
- Headquarters: No. 251, Third Floor, Seikkantha St. (Upper Block), Kyauktada Township, Yangon
- Membership: 250,000 (self-claim)
- Ideology: Social democracy Federalism
- Political position: Centre-left
- Regional affiliation: Network of Social Democracy in Asia; Historical: National Council of the Union of Burma
- International affiliation: Progressive Alliance
- Colours: Red and yellow
- Slogan: "Peace and solidarity"
- Seats in the Amyotha Hluttaw: 0 / 224
- Seats in the Pyithu Hluttaw: 0 / 440

Party flag

Website
- www.dpnsburmese.org

The Democratic Party for a New Society (Burmese: လူ့ဘောင်သစ်ဒီမိုကရက်တစ်ပါတီ; abbr. DPNS) is a registered political party in Myanmar (Burma), founded in 1988 by Moe Thee Zun, the then Secretary General of the All Burma Students League (ABSL). The party campaigns independently from other parties and is unaffiliated with the more influential National League for Democracy (NLD), despite sharing similar goals.

== History ==
The Democratic Party for a New Society (DPNS) was founded on 14 October 1988 by students and youth, in response to the military junta government's suppression of the 8888 Uprising and pro-democracy movements in Myanmar. Its original organisation, the All Burma Students League (ABSL) was banned from participating in political reforms during the aftermath of the 8888 Uprising. After the military junta refused to recognise the results of the 1990 general election, the DPNS was declared illegal, and 1,500 of its members were arrested, with other pro-democracy movements and parties meeting a similar fate.

At the time of its founding, the DPNS was the second largest party, after the National League for Democracy (NLD), and attracted many young students, both from high schools and universities, many of whom were members of the ABSL. Initially, the DPNS was used as the legal political wing of the All Burma Students' Union (ABSU), and worked with the National League for Democracy (NLD) and other pro-democracy parties, but has since unaffiliated themselves with the NLD and registered as its own independent party.

== Objectives ==
The party's proclaimed objectives are as follows:

- To achieve democracy
- To protect human rights
- To attain peace
- To establish a federal union
- To create a sustainable developed society
