= Social Democratic Students (Finland) =

Social Democratic Students Sosialidemokraattiset Opiskelijat (SONK)
- Chairperson: Miku Kuuskorpi
- Founded: 1963
- Headquarters: Helsinki, Finland
- Ideology: Social democracy
- Mother party: Social Democratic Party of Finland
- International affiliation: International Union of Socialist Youth
- European affiliation: Young European Socialists
- Website: sonk.fi

Social Democratic Students - SONK (Finnish: Sosialidemokraattiset Opiskelijat, abbr. SONK, nicknamed: Demariopiskelijat in Finnish) is a political student organization in Finland founded in 1963. Social Democratic Students is the student organization of the Social Democratic Party of Finland (SDP), whose goal is to bring together students to advocate for education, freedom, equality, internationalism, and justice. The aim of Social Democratic Students is to promote everyone’s right to education, employment, and a welfare — without this coming at the expense of other people or the environment.

Internationally, Social Democratic Students is active in umbrella organizations such as the Federation of Nordic Social Democratic Youth (FNSU), the Young European Socialists (YES), and the International Union of Socialist Youth (IUSY). International cooperation plays an important role in the activities of Social Democratic Students.
