= Federation of Young Socialists =

Youth wing of the Italian Socialist Party

Federation of Young Socialists Federazione dei Giovani Socialisti
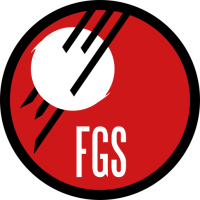
- President: Yauhenyia Cherta
- Chairman: Niccolò Musmeci
- Vice-Chairman: Francesco Mancini, Matteo Mugnaini
- Founded: 1994
- Preceded by: Italian Socialist Youth Federation (FGSI) (1903-1994)
- Headquarters: Via Santa Caterina da Siena 57, 00186 Roma.
- Ideology: Social democracy Democratic Socialism
- Mother party: Italian Socialists (1994–1998); Italian Democratic Socialists (1998–2007); Italian Socialist Party (since 2007)
- International affiliation: International Union of Socialist Youth (IUSY)
- European affiliation: European Community Organisation of Socialist Youth (ECOSY)
- Website: federazionegiovanisocialisti.com

The Federation of Young Socialists (FGS) is a youth political organization founded in 1994. It is currently affiliated with the Italian Socialist Party, and in the past it had ties with the Italian Socialists and the Italian Democratic Socialists.

Its history is rooted in the Italian socialist tradition, inheriting the legacy of the historic Italian Socialist Youth Federation (FGSI). The current Secretary General is Niccolò Musmeci.

== History ==
The organization proclaims itself heir to the Italian Socialist Youth Federation (FGSI), a youth organization of the Italian Socialist Party initially born in Florence on 6 and 7 September 1903, re-founded after the Fascist period in 1944, by the anti-fascist militants Eugenio Colorni, Giorgio Lauchard, Matteo Matteotti, Leo Solari and Mario Zagari.

Shortly after the end of World War II, between 1947 and 1957, the organization took on new young leaders, all of whom would hold institutional or political positions in the 1970s. These included Emo Egoli, Giacomo Princigalli, Vincenzo Balsamo, Giorgio Ruffolo, Claudio Signorile, Dario Valori, Luigi Passoni, and Cesare Bensi.

The young socialists were mainly active in the internal left wing, as many of them had been trained under the Marxist socialist leader Rodolfo Morandi.

So much so that when, in 1964, the left wing of the PSI broke away to found the PSIUP, almost 100% of young socialists followed the splinter group led by Vecchietti, Valori, Foa, Lussu, Basso, and Libertini.

With Tangentopoli, the Italian political situation - and therefore also that of the young socialists - enters a period of great chaos. Ottaviano Del Turco, secretary of the PSI from 1993 to 1994 (the year of its dissolution), appointed the then vice president of the Iusy and head of international political campaigns of the FGSI, Luca Cefisi, to carry out the role of national coordinator in this emergency situation: many leaders, shocked, in fact abandoned political militancy, or passed, according to personal inclinations, to Forza Italia or to the Democratic Party of the Left; others instead abandoned politics.

After the dissolution of the historical Italian Socialist Party, in October 1994 the Italian Socialist Youth Federation (FGSI) was succeeded by the Federation of Young Socialists; the new youth organisation was chaired by Luca Cefisi, previously secretary of the FGSI; the nascent Federation held its first congress in 1996, electing Marco Di Lello National Secretary, and Claudio Carotti, Deputy Secretary. The Federation of Young Socialists, which remained affiliated with the International Union of Socialist Youth and the European Community Organisation of Socialist Youth, federated first with the Italian Socialists and later with the Italian Democratic Socialists. It held its inaugural congress in Grottaferrata on 18-20 October 1996.

Later it joined the experience of the Socialist Constituent Assembly which ended on 4-6 July 2008 with the 1st Congress of the resounded Socialist Party; within which, albeit with some divergences, it officially supported the candidacy of Pia Locatelli for the secretariat of the party.

In October 2008 the National Directorate of Young Socialists decided to celebrate their congress on 31 January and 1 February 2009 in Salerno, in which Luigi Iorio was elected new National Secretary. The VI Congress of the FGS was held in Rome from 11 to 13 November 2011, with Claudia Bastianelli unanimously elected National Secretary. Bastianelli was the first woman to take over the leadership of the Socialist youth organisation.

During the VII Congress of the FGS, held in Ravenna between 9 and 11 January 2015, Roberto Sajeva was unanimously elected new Secretary.

In 2016 the Federation hosts the YES Summer Camp, a summer meeting of all political youth members of the Young European Socialists (YES). On this occasion, the FGS also adopted a new symbol by Camillo Bosco: a sun, the "star of the future", and the Three Arrows. The latter is a historical socialist symbol, dating back even earlier to the Iron Front, an anti-fascist paramilitary organisation in Germany which opposed Hitler and his Nazi Party.

From 19 to 21 October 2018 the VIII National Congress was held in Rome, which led to the election of Enrico Maria Pedrelli as Secretary.

On 12 April 2019, the Federation of Young Socialists clashed with the Italian Socialist Party following the political agreement that saw the latter party, a member of the Party of European Socialists, compete in the 2019 European Parliament election in alliance with More Europe, which is affiliated with the Alliance of Liberals and Democrats for Europe Party. This stance was heavily criticised by the party, but there were many exponents who expressed their solidarity with the FGS, inside and outside the party.

On October 27, 28, and 29, 2023, at the Socialist Circle of Rome in Garbatella, the 10th National Congress unanimously elected Nicolò Musmeci as National Secretary, Claudia Corso Marcucci as President, and two Vice-Secretaries, Mattia Giuseppe Maria Carramusa and Giorgia Natalini, with the motion "Creative Destruction."

On 27, 28, and 29 October 2023, the 10th National Congress took place at the Socialists’ Circle in Rome, in the Garbatella district. It unanimously elected Niccolò Musmeci as National Secretary, Claudia Corso Marcucci as President, and two Vice-Secretaries, Mattia Giuseppe Maria Carramusa and Giorgia Natalini. The congress motion “Creative Destruction” set out the guidelines for the future of the Federation, focusing on political training, local grassroots presence, and innovation in socialist proposals.

From 30 August to 1 September 2024, in Brindisi, the FGS held its Political Training School at Palazzo Granafei-Nervegna. Among the many topics discussed were minorities, work, feminism, and internationalism, along with the participation of prominent guests from the national scene.

From 18 to 20 January 2025, in Hammamet, a delegation took part in the celebrations for the 25th anniversary of the death of Bettino Craxi. The delegation’s presence highlights the FGS’s connection to Craxi’s political legacy, which has continued for years.

=== The 11th national congress ===
The Federation held its 11th national congress in Rome from 30 October to 1 November 2026. Speakers included João Martins Pereira, president of the Young European Socialists, and Pina Picierno, vice-president of the European Parliament.

The second day featured a discussion on Europe and foreign policy, with contributions from Member of the European Parliament Brando Benifei, More Europe president Matteo Hallissey, Amanda Ribichini, national secretary of the Young European Federalists' Italian section, and Italian Radicals treasurer Patrizia De Grazia. Representatives of European organisations also addressed the congress, including Ioel Arturo Roccas, vice-president of the European Union of Jewish Students, and Ariel Heller, president of Keshet Europe.

The congress debate centred on the motion “CONtroSINISTRA – Manifesto per la sinistra riformista del XXI secolo”, comprising 88 points and presented in support of Niccolò Musmeci’s candidacy. The document drew on the tradition of liberal socialism and addressed employment, young people’s financial independence, civil rights and European integration. Musmeci was unanimously re-elected national secretary, while the congress assembly unanimously elected Yauhenyia Cherta as national president, succeeding Claudia Corso Marcucci. The secretary also announced Francesco Mancini and Matteo Mugnaini as the new national deputy secretaries.

== Secretaries ==
- Luca Cefisi (1994–1996)
- Marco Di Lello (1996–1999)
- Claudio Accogli (1999–2003)
- Gianluca Quadrana (2003–2006)
- Francesco Mosca (2006–2008)
- Luigi Iorio (2009–2011)
- Claudia Bastianelli (2011–2015)
- Roberto Sajeva (2015–2018)
- Enrico Maria Pedrelli (2018–2023)
- Niccolò Musmeci (2023-present)

== Congress ==
I Congress - Grottaferrata, 18-20 ottobre 1996

II Congress - 1999

III Congress - 2003

IV Congress - 2006

V Congress - Salerno, 31 gennaio-1 febbraio 2009

VI Congress - Roma, 11-13 novembre 2011

VII Congress - Ravenna, 9-11 gennaio 2015

VIII Congress - Roma, 19-21 ottobre 2018

IX Congress - Roma, 22-24 ottobre 2021

X Congress - Roma, 27-29 ottobre 2023

XI Congress - Roma, 30-31 ottobre e 1 novembre 2026
