= Young Social Democrats Federation =

Social democratic youth movement

Young Social Democrats Federation Federacja Młodych Socjaldemokratów
- Leader: Kacper Krakowiak
- Headquarters: Chmielna Street 2, Warsaw
- Mother party: New Left
- International affiliation: Young European Socialists
- Website: nowyfms.pl

The Young Social Democrats Federation (Polish: Federacja Młodych Socjaldemokratów, FMS) is Polish youth organisation focused on social democracy, associated with the Democratic Left Alliance and later the New Left. The organisation brings together young people who have left-wing political views.

== History ==
The FMS was established in 2003. It was a merger of two other youth organisations, the Young Left Alliance and the Young Democratic Left Association. In 2006 they signed an agreement with other left youth organisations in Poland. In 2014 and 2018 they joined the SLD Lewica Razem election committee and presented their candidates in local votings.

== Program ==
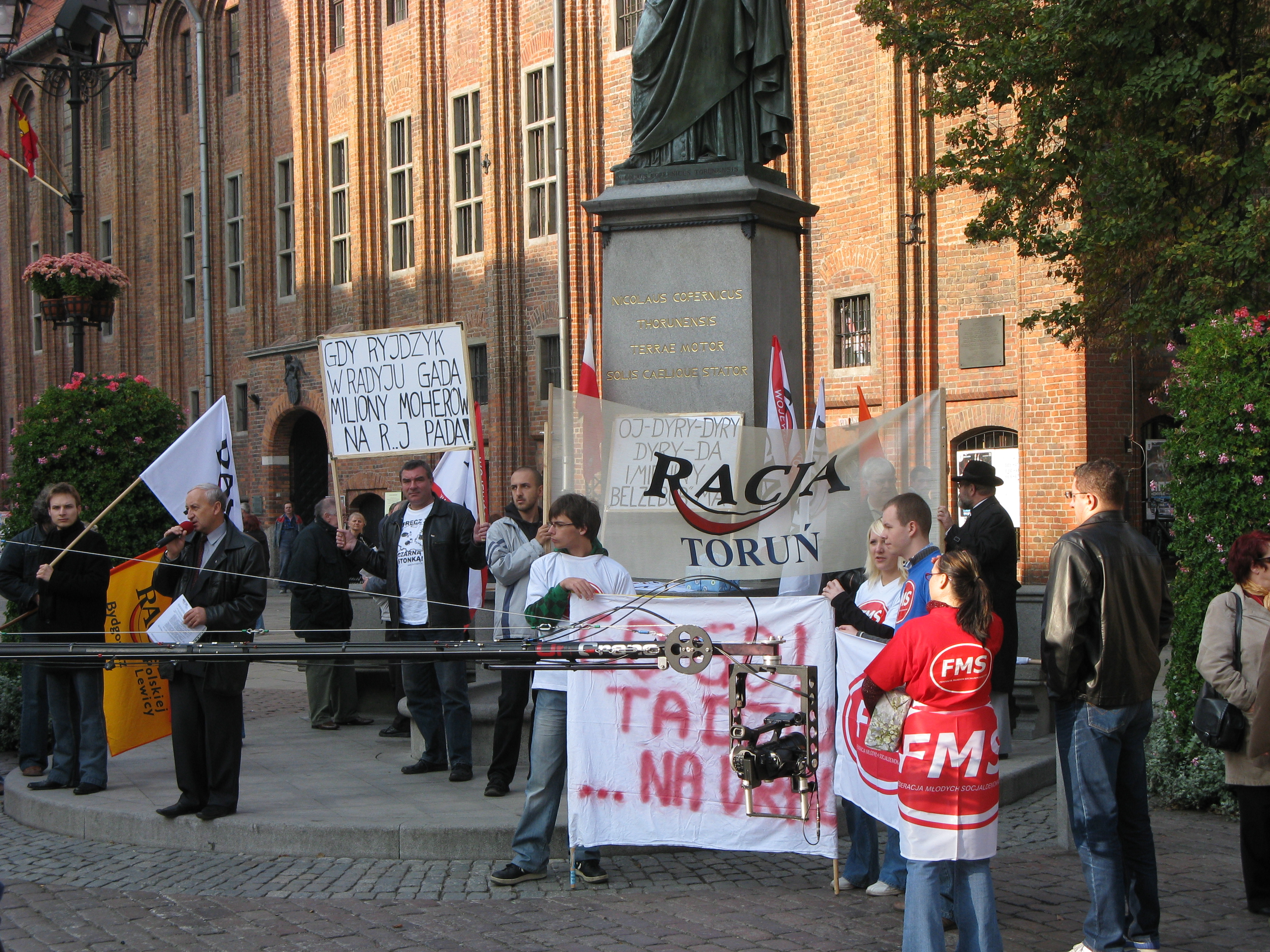
Anti-clericalism protest in Toruń

The organisation is focused on social democracy, social equality and justice, and green politics. The FMS opposes fascism, xenophobia, intolerance and breaking human rights. The organisation supports pro-European and anti-clericalism politics.

== Leaders ==
- Grzegorz Pietruczuk (2004–2008)
- Marceli Zaborek (2008–2010)
- Paulina Piechna-Więckiewicz (2010–2012)
- Grzegorz Gruchalski (2012–2014)
- Maciej Onasz (2014–2016)
- Błażej Makarewicz (2016–2018)
- Adam Wojech (2018–2020)
- Artur Jaskulski (since 2020)
