= Republican People's Party Youth =

Youth organization of the Republican People's Party in Turkey

Republican People's Party Youth CHP Gençlik Kolları
- President: Berfin Karan
- Founded: 2 March 1953
- Headquarters: Ankara, Turkey
- Ideology: Kemalism; Social democracy Progressivism; Pro-Europeanism
- Position: Center-left
- Mother party: Republican People's Party
- International affiliation: International Union of Socialist Youth
- European affiliation: Young European Socialists
- Website: genclik.chp.org.tr

Republican People's Party Youth (also known as CHP Youth) (Turkish: Cumhuriyet Halk Partisi Gençlik Kolları or CHP Gençlik Kolları) is the youth organization of the Republican People's Party in Turkey. The organization has been a member of International Union of Socialist Youth since 2012 and Young European Socialists since 2011.

They hosted the YES Summer Camp 2013 in Foça, İzmir.
