= Socialist Youth League (Denmark, 1935) =

Socialistisk Ungdomsforbund (Socialist Youth League), a leftist youth movement in Denmark 1935–1936. SUF was formed as a split from Danmarks Socialdemokratiske Ungdom. SUF published Revolte.
