= Nordic Young Conservative Union =

Nordic Young Conservative Union (Nordisk Ungkonservativ Union; NUU) is an umbrella organization formed in 1946 in Gothenburg, with the increased political and economic cooperation between the Nordic countries and is currently the conservative group in Nordic Youth Council (HNR).

== Members ==
Country	Youth league	Mother party
Denmark	Young Conservatives	Conservative People's Party
Finland	Coalition Party Youth League	National Coalition Party
Faroe Islands	Høgravendur Ungdómur X við A	People's Party
Iceland	Young Independents	Independence Party
Norway	Norwegian Young Conservatives	Conservative Party
Sweden	Moderate Youth League	Moderate Party
Åland	Young Moderates	Moderate Coalition for Åland
