= Young Independents =

Political youth organization in Iceland

Young Independents Ungir sjálfstæðismenn
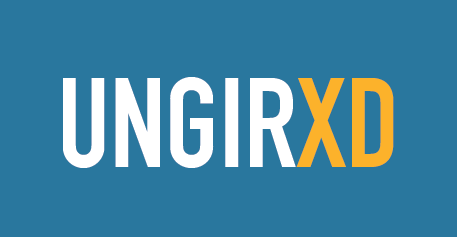
- President: Júlíus Viggó Ólafsson
- Founded: 27 June 1930
- Headquarters: Háaleitisbraut 1; 105 Reykjavík
- Ideology: Liberal conservatism Libertarianism; Euroscepticism
- Mother party: Independence Party
- International affiliation: International Young Democrat Union
- European affiliation: Democrat Youth Community of Europe; European Young Conservatives
- Nordic affiliation: Nordic Young Conservative Union (NUU)
- Website: www.sus.is

Young Independents (Icelandic: Ungir sjálfstæðismenn), abbreviated to SUS, is the youth wing of the Independence Party of Iceland.

Young Independents was founded at Þingvellir on 27 June 1930: the year after the Independence Party itself. Its current chairman is Viktor Pétur Finnsson, who was elected on 17 September 2023.

It is liberally conservative, like its mother party, but often expresses more classical liberal views. The party can conduct its own policy and campaigns. In 2011, it criticised capital controls, subsidies to the Symphony Orchestra, and the application for EU membership. In February 2011, it ran an advert in Morgunblaðið that urged Independence Party MPs to vote against the government paying foreign liabilities accrued by Icesave. SUS put forward an alternative budget in 2010, and criticised Independence Party MPs for following convention by not voting against the government's budget.

Its largest branch is its Reykjavík branch, Heimdallur.
