= SDLP Youth =

Youth wing of the Social Democratic and Labour Party

- Chairperson: Fiachra McCarney-Savage
- Vice-Chairperson: Eilidh O'Connor
- Founded: 10 June 1995; 31 years ago
- Headquarters: Belfast, Northern Ireland
- Ideology: Social democracy Irish nationalism
- Mother party: SDLP
- International affiliation: International Union of Socialist Youth (IUSY) (observer)
- European affiliation: Young European Socialists (YES)
- Website: www.sdlpyouth.org

SDLP Youth is the youth wing of the social democratic and Irish nationalist political party, the Social Democratic and Labour Party (SDLP). Membership of the organisation is entitled to SDLP party members of the age 30 and under. It is organised throughout Northern Ireland and plays an active role within the SDLP at all levels of the organisation.

== Organisation ==
SDLP Youth is currently organised across much of Northern Ireland, including University societies. The group is split into a number of branches with the executive committee acting as the governing body of the organisation.

=== Executive ===
SDLP Youth is organised at a national level by the Youth Executive. The Youth Executive is responsible for the day-to-day running of SDLP Youth. It consists of nine Officers elected at the annual Youth Conference.

The current Officers of the Youth Executive elected in March 2026 are:

Executive Position	Officer	Constituency
Chairperson	Fiachra McCarney-Savage	Belfast South and Mid Down
Vice-Chairperson and North-South Officer	Eilidh O'Connor	East Derry
Secretary General	Aaron Blaney	Belfast West
Campaigns and Communications Officer	Will Polland	Strangford
Equality Officer	Eabha Cowan	East Antrim
Membership Officer	Tony McCann	North Down
Policy Officer	Alex Egan	Belfast South and Mid Down
Under 18's Officer	Jack McCubbin	Fermanagh and South Tyrone
Women's Officer	Chloe Finlay	Strangford

=== Branches ===
The current SDLP Youth branch organisations are:

- Antrim
- Belfast
- Derry
- East Derry
- Fermanagh
- Newry and Armagh
- Queen's University Belfast
- South Down
- Ulster University
- West Tyrone

Former SDLP branch organisations include:

- Magee SDLP
- Strabane
- Upper Bann

== History ==
A youth section of the SDLP was first floated in late 1973 which led to the short lived group "the Young Social Democrats" which organised from 1974 to 1976.

The current youth wing started organising in the early 1990s bringing motions, such as the decriminalisation of marijuana, to party conferences but it wasn’t until 10 June 1995 that SDLP Youth became a distinct section of the SDLP when it was added to the party constitution.

== International ==
SDLP Youth are full members of the Young European Socialists (YES), formerly the European Community Organisation of Socialist Youth (ECOSY), having been admitted at the 1994 conference in Munich. At this 1994 conference future SDLP MLA for South Belfast Conall McDevitt was elected as an ECOSY vice-president after being elected the National Secretary of Labour Youth in 1993. At 2021 YES Congress Leah Rea became the first member of SDLP Youth to be nominated and elected to the YES Presidium as Vice-President.

In 2016 SDLP Youth and YES held a joint seminar in Belfast on "far-right extremism and Brexit" which was attended by young socialist activists from across Europe.

SDLP Youth are also observer members of International Union of Socialist Youth.
