= Socialist Students of Austria =

Austrian socialist and social democratic student organization

Socialist Students of Austria Verband Sozialistischer StudentInnen Österreichs (VSStÖ)
- Chairperson: Miriam Amann
- Founded: 1893
- Headquarters: Amtshausgasse 4, A-1050; Vienna, Austria
- Ideology: Social democracy Democratic socialism Social corporatism
- International affiliation: International Union of Socialist Youth (IUSY)
- European affiliation: Young European Socialists (YES)
- Website: vsstoe.at

The Socialist Students of Austria (German: Verband Sozialistischer StudentInnen Österreichs, VSStÖ) is a socialist and social democratic student organization at Austrian universities.

== History ==
The preliminary organization of the VSStÖ was formed in 1893 in Vienna. In the beginning, it was more of a student debate club that was sympathetic to young workers and the union movement. It fought for general elections in which both men and women could vote, free access to universities, and against bourgeoisie science. The resistance to nationalist and antisemitic movements at universities led to discrimination and attacks against members of the Socialist Students and led finally to the prohibition of the VSStÖ during the Austrofascism period until the end of World War II.

After the liberation from the National Socialists by the Allied Forces in 1945, the Socialist Students were actively involved in the foundation of democratic student representation, which was established in 1946 as the Austrian National Union of Students. On the ideological basis of Marxism, the VSStÖ has subsequently fought for free and open access to universities, sufficient social funds for students, gender equality, and has taken an active role in the peace movement as well as the anti-globalisation.

== Organization and activities ==
The VSStÖ is active nationwide and has chapters in all university cities. Their members run in students union elections every two years at every university levels. In a coalition with the Greens, the VSStÖ became the president of the national Student Union in 2001 and remained in this position until 2007. Since 2007, the VSStÖ is in coalition with the Greens and varying independent groups (Fachschaftsliste or FEST).

The VSStÖ's international activities include being a member of the Young European Socialists (YES) and International Union of Socialist Youth (IUSY).
