= PASOK Youth =

Youth organization of the Panhellenic Socialist Movement

PASOK Youth Νεολαία ΠΑΣΟΚ
- Founded: 1974
- Dissolved: 2026
- Headquarters: Athens, Greece
- Ideology: Social democracy Pro-Europeanism
- Mother party: Panhellenic Socialist Movement (PASOK)
- International affiliation: International Union of Socialist Youth
- European affiliation: Young European Socialists
- Website: neolaia-pasok.gr

PASOK Youth (Greek: Νεολαία ΠΑΣΟΚ, translit. Neolaia PASOK) was the youth organization of the Panhellenic Socialist Movement (PASOK) party of Greece.

The parent party's ideology was social democracy.
