= Socialist Workers Youth of Saarland =

Organization

Saar Socialist Workers Youth Sozialistische Arbeiter-Jugend des Saarlandes
- Chairperson: Erich Ladwein
- Founded: October 26, 1952
- Headquarters: Brauerstraße 6-8, Saarbrücken 3
- Mother party: Social Democratic Party of Saarland
- International affiliation: International Union of Socialist Youth

Socialist Workers Youth of Saarland (German: Sozialistische Arbeiter-Jugend des Saarlandes, abbreviated 'SAJ') was a socialist youth movement in the Saar. SAJ was founded on October 26, 1952, at the restaurant of the Saar Landtag in Saarbrücken. The founding of SAJ had been preceded by the break between the Socialist Youth League (BSJ) and the Social Democratic Party of Saarland (SPS). SAJ was launched as the new SPS youth wing.

SAJ had around 2,500 members. Erich Ladwein was the chairman of the organization. The organization issued two publications, Jugend und Welt (weekly) and Gruppenabend (monthly). It was a member of the International Union of Socialist Youth (alongside the BSJ).
