= Roberto Sajeva =

Italian politician

Roberto Sajeva (born 29 March 1985 in Palermo) is an Italian politician, editorial director of the cultural-political journal Mondoperaio. Sajeva has been national secretary of the Federation of Young Socialists.
