= Luxembourg Socialist Youths =

Luxembourg Socialist Youths Jonk Sozialiste Lëtzebuerg
- President: Amir Vesali & Lisa Kersch
- Secretary General: Elisha Winckel
- Founded: 1947
- Headquarters: Luxembourg
- Ideology: Social democracy
- Mother party: Luxembourg Socialist Workers' Party
- International affiliation: International Union of Socialist Youth
- European affiliation: Young European Socialists
- Website: Official website

Luxembourg Socialist Youths (Luxembourgish: Jonk Sozialiste Lëtzebuerg, JSL) is the youth organization of the Luxembourg Socialist Workers' Party in Luxembourg. The organization is a member of International Union of Socialist Youth and Young European Socialists.
