= SDP Youth Forum =

Youth organisation of Social Democratic Party of Croatia

SDP Youth Forum Forum mladih SDP-a
- President: Lovro Lukavečki
- Founded: 1992
- Headquarters: Trg Drage Iblera 9, Zagreb, Croatia
- Membership: more than 8000
- Ideology: Social democracy Anti-fascism; Pro-Europeanism
- Mother party: Social Democratic Party of Croatia
- International affiliation: International Union of Socialist Youth
- European affiliation: Young European Socialists
- Website: fmsdp.org

The SDP Youth Forum (Croatian: Forum mladih SDP-a, FM SDP) is the youth organisation of the Social Democratic Party of Croatia (SDP).

According to Youth Forum statute, it is an organisation that is committed to building a democratic society in which solidarity, freedom, equality, social justice and quality education will be available to everyone. It sees a society in which the dignity of the individual will be guaranteed in social, legal and economic certainty. Its goal is to enable young people to participate in public life and decision-making process. Youth Forum members are able to get involved in the SDP through local policy events, campaigning or by attending events and social gatherings.

Youth Forum was founded in 1992 and is affiliated internationally to both the International Union of Socialist Youth and Young European Socialists.

== Membership ==
Every Croatian citizen from 16 to 30 years of age can become a member of the Youth Forum. Members of Youth Forum do not have to be members of SDP, but must not be members of another political party. The organisation has more than 8,000 members.

== Structure ==
The structure of the organization is determined by organisation's statute. It is organised at the state level and consists of county, city and municipal organizations.

The central authorities are:

- Convention
- Main Board
- The Supervisory Board
- The Presidency
- President

The highest body of the Youth forum is the Convention that consists of delegates elected on the conventions of local organizations. Delegates elect the President, Vice-Presidents and the Supervisory Board for a term of two years. President of Youth forum is in charge of representing the organization in public.

The student wing of Youth Forum is Social Democratic Students Union (SSU).

Current leadership:

- President - Lovro Lukavečki
- Vice presidents - Karlo Vedak, Dominik Mohorovičić
- Secretary general - Marija Jagečić
- International secretary - Dajana Ivičić

=== National congresses ===
- 1992: 1. congress (founding)
- 1996: 2. congress
- 05. 01. 1998.: 3 congress
- 17. 12. 2000.: 4. congress
- 21. and 22. 12. 2002.: 5. congress
- 26. 08. 2005.: 6. congress
- 8. 03. 2008.: 7. congress
- 22. 05. 2010.: 8. congress
- 05. 07. 2014.: 9. congress
- 18. 03. 2017.: 10. congress
- 23. 11. 2019.: 11. congress
- 29. 05. 2022.: 12. congress

=== Presidents ===
1. Igor Dragovan
2. NN
3. Hrvoje Klasić
4. Gordan Maras
5. Arsen Bauk
6. Dan Špicer
7. Davor Bernardić
8. Saša Đujić
9. Nenad Livun
10. Biljana Gaća
11. Lovro Lukavečki
