= Young Conservatives (Denmark) =

Political youth organization in Denmark

Young Conservatives of Denmark Konservativ Ungdom (Danish)
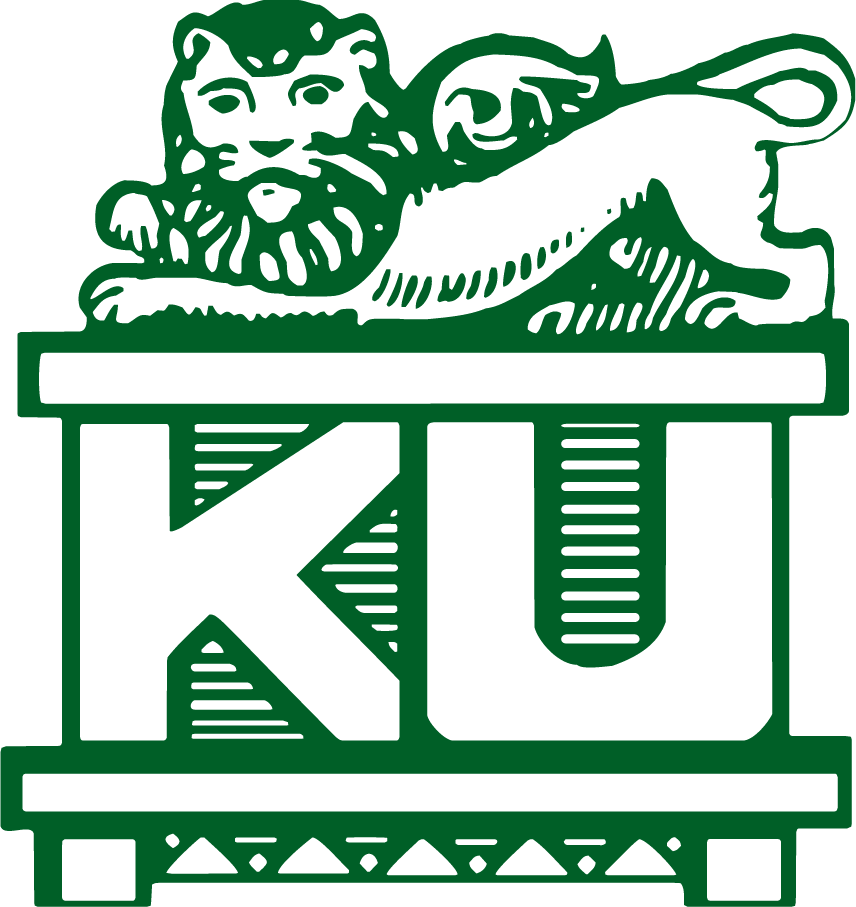
- Chairman: Jacob Feldborg Andersen
- Founded: 8 December 1904
- Headquarters: Vimmelskaftet 41F, 1. sal, 1161 København K
- Membership: ▲989
- Ideology: Liberal conservatism National conservatism Social conservatism
- Position: Centre-right to right-wing
- Mother party: Conservative People's Party
- Global affiliation: International Young Democrat Union (IYDU)
- European affiliation: Youth of the European People's Party (YEPP)
- Nordic affiliation: Nordic Young Conservative Union (NUU)
- Website: www.konservativungdom.dk

Katrine Winkel-Holm speaking at an arrangement held by the Danish Free Society and the Young Conservatives

Young Conservatives Denmark (Danish: Konservativ Ungdom, abbreviated KU) is the youth wing of the Conservative People's Party of Denmark.

== History ==
Founded by Carl F. Herman von Rosen on 8 December 1904, more than a decade before its mother party, KU is the oldest youth political organisation in Denmark and the oldest remaining youth political organisation in the world.

Following its formation, KU grew quickly as an organisation and many local branches throughout Denmark sprung up. Later prominent party members were chairmen of KU in this period, most notably John Christmas Møller, a historic figure in Danish politics, exiled in the United Kingdom during the Second World War, and celebrated as one of the reasons why Denmark was counted among the allied forces after World War II, despite its collaboration with Germany. KU is most famous for three periods of history - the massive growth during the 1930s, the resistance fight during World War II, and the ideological awakening of the 1980s.

=== The 1930s ===
In the early 1930s KU experienced a major increase in membership and peaked at more than 30,000 members under the leadership of chairman Jack G. Westergaard. KU became somewhat of an institution by being the first non-leftist organization to use 'modern campaign methods', such as posters, pamphlets, marches, demonstrations and gatherings. Hosting open-air meetings with thousands of participants, demonstrating in the parks of Copenhagen, and flying over Copenhagen in propeller airplanes with conservative air leaflets became the trademark of the organization. One such incidence, when Copenhagen was plastered with thousands of campaign posters in a single night - is this day commemorated in the official KU song.

Like other youth organisations of the era (like their Swedish counterpart National League of Sweden), KU also took a critical stance towards democracy in the early 1930s, and the ability of democracy to handle the economical and societal crisis that the West was facing. Parts of KU wanted to replace parliamentarism with a corporative system and found symbolic inspiration in fascist Italy and Germany. This reflected itself in the green uniforms and leather straps members of KU wore and the formation of 'Stormtropperne', a security patrol designed to protect open-air speakers from violent assaults by socialists. The German Sturmabteilung was the inspiration. This more unfortunate period of KU history is something the organization still struggles with, even though many KU-organisations around the country still own banners from that period, with the local branches in Gentofte and Aarhus being examples of this.

The uniformation, and the formation of a security patrol was also used by the young social democrats and the young communists, but has since been ascribed solely to KU. The uniformation only lasted for 3 days before it was banned by the Danish parliament following a violent incident in which a young social democrat from 'DSU' killed a young communist in a bar brawl. It has also been insinuated by layman history, most notably in the popular Danish TV-series 'Matador', that KU was directly inspired by Nazism and anti-semitism, which, however, was never the case, and has since been rebutted by history.

Following the growth of fascism in Europe, Jack Westergaard and his supporters in KU simultaneously lost momentum in the organisation, and were excluded, as the tides - with later party leader Aksel Møller as new chairman - began to change.

=== KU during WWII ===
On 9 April 1940 German troops rolled over the Danish border as part of Operation Weserübung, which immediately became the beginning of the infamous and much-debated collaboration between Nazi Germany and the Danish Government. Whilst most of the Danish population did not approve of the collaboration, many saw little reason to fight, or did not begin doing so until after the Molotov–Ribbentrop pact was breached in 1941, whereafter communists joined the fight.

KU's young conservatives were therefore among the first to pick up any real resistance, viewing the collaboration policy led by the government as national treason committed by the Social Democrats and the Danish Social Liberal Party, the two parties in government which had disarmed Denmark in the preceding years from being the heaviest armed country in Europe to one of the least militarized in the late 1930s.

A young conservative, Arne Sejr, wrote 'Danskerens Regler' (The Rules of the Dane) on the very day of the invasion, and instigated civil disobedience and sabotage of Nazi rule. As the war went on, thousands of members of KU began committing illegal sabotage, writing illegal papers and employing guerilla tactics. Typically the recruitment of freedom fighters took place in 'terrænsportsforeninger' (terrain sports clubs) which were legal gymnastics clubs that arranged orienteering, but also functioned as a cover for recruitment and training camps, employing military-like training exercises. To this day KU's legendary 'Konsulentkursus' (KK) (Consultant Course) exists, which albeit in a moderated form works in a similar way, and each year attracts young conservatives who go through a selection procedure.

Due to the chaotic period, it is unfortunately impossible to state the exact number of casualties, but more than 50 KU members are believed to have given their lives in a fight for the freedom of Denmark - more than any other youth organisation during the resistance. Bjarne Reuter, a popular and much appraised Danish author, has written the bestseller The Boys from St. Petri (Drengene fra Skt. Petri), a story of a group of young boys who form a resistance group and repeatedly sabotage and destroy Nazi installations until they are finally caught and sent to a concentration camp. The Boys from St. Petri is, in fact, the dramatization of the true story of 'Aalborg KU', and their resistance fight.

=== KU after the war ===
Shortly after the war ended on 5 May 1945, KU experienced a large increase in members again. Two legendary characters in Danish politics, former minister of justice Erik Ninn-Hansen and former prime-minister Poul Schlüter were chairmen during this period.

In the 1960s KU considered changing its name to 'Centrum', and the local branch Odense KU even proposed a resolution introducing economic democracy, termed 'ØD' in Denmark at the given period of time. This is to be seen as a result of the spring of 1968, and the drastic drop in membership as the agenda was now mostly set by the left and the hippie- and peace-movement. Any major changes in politics, however, never happened, and the name, as well as the logo, stuck with KU.

=== KUs renaissance in the 1980s ===
In the 1980s, as Poul Schlüter became party leader and later prime minister, and inspired by Margaret Thatcher, Ronald Reagan, and the conservative wave sweeping over the Western hemisphere, KU experienced a renaissance in membership. Once again as in the 1930s, KU set the agenda in many areas of the public debate, and members of KU went on to become today's leading voices in the political debate on libertarian and economically conservative issues.

Since then KU has gone down in membership, but is now once again experiencing an increase in membership and recently gained 800 members in 3 weeks through its kapitalist.dk campaign. The national congress in 2006 drew more than 250 delegates, something which has not been seen in KU for many years.

=== KU today ===
At the mother party convention in 2005, after heavy research including an interview with former Estonian prime minister Mart Laar, KU proposed a resolution committing the party to a flat tax system, instead of the current progressive Danish tax system. The resolution which was narrowly defeated, caught enormous attention in the media, and the following day, Berlingske Tidende, one of the largest papers in the country, praised KU for its audacity and talent and proclaimed that KU was the political future of tomorrow.

As of April 2025, the executive board consists of:

Jacob Feldborg Andersen (KU i Odense) (President), Emil Luna Bentsen (KU i Stor-Århus) (Vice President) and the board, Alexandra Lund Rasmussen (Gentofte KU), Morten Norup Westfall (KU i Odense), Camila Mosegaard (Frederikssund-Egedal KU), Victoria Helene Olsen (Ringsted KU) and Sigurd Hebo Lønholdt (KU i København).

== Honorary and prominent members ==
KU has many former members that have since gone into particularly politics, academia and business, and founded successful international companies or become professors or ministers of government.

The Danish freedom institution Libertas was also founded by members of KU.

Many of the founders of CEPOS were current or former members of KU.

In 2004 former Prime Minister Poul Schlüter was awarded the honorary membership of KU for excellence in political leadership and for the distribution of conservatism in Danish politics.

== Sources and bibliography ==
- Much of the text in this article is based on material from the organization's official website.
- Christensen, Lars. Ungdomsoprør: Konservativ Ungdom gennem 90 år. Frederiksberg: 1994.
