= Young Social Democrats (Czech Republic) =

Young Social Democrats Mladí sociální demokraté
- Chairman: Vojtěch Mrázek
- General Secretary: Alžběta Kalálová
- Founded: 19 July 1990
- Headquarters: Hybernská 7, Prague
- Ideology: Social democracy Socialism
- Mother party: Social Democracy (SOCDEM) (until 2026)
- International affiliation: International Union of Socialist Youth (IUSY)
- European affiliation: Young European Socialists (YES)
- Website: https://www.mladi.cz/

Czech Young Social Democrats (abbreviated as MSD, or also MLADÍ.CZ) is an independent and autonomous association of social-democratic and socialist orientation, bringing together young people between the ages of 14 and 35. The association is guided by the values of peace, justice, and dignity. The aim of the Young Social Democrats is to combat fascism, overcome the capitalist economic system, and build a modern democratic and socialist society.

MSD cooperates with all social democratic and socialist organizations and is a member of the International Union of Socialist Youth (IUSY) and the Young European Socialists (YES). Its primary, but not exclusive, political partner in the Czech Republic is the political party Social Democracy.

Historically it builds on legacy of Czechoslovak Social Democratic Youth.
