= Social Democratic Students of Sweden =

Social Democratic Students of Sweden Socialdemokratiska studentförbundet
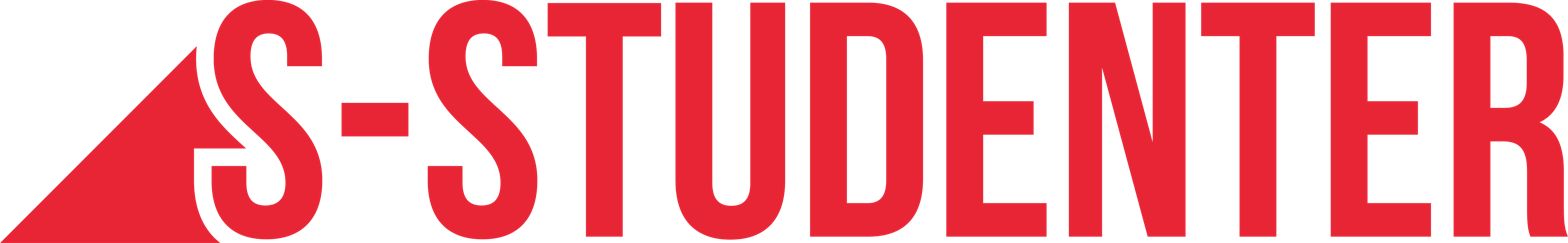
- Chairperson: Elfva Barrio
- Secretary General: Alma Hedmark
- Founded: 1990
- Headquarters: Sveavägen 68, Stockholm
- Ideology: Social democracy Democratic socialism Feminism
- Mother party: Swedish Social Democratic Party
- International affiliation: International Union of Socialist Youth
- European affiliation: Young European Socialists
- Website: s-studenter.se

The Social Democratic Students of Sweden (Swedish: Socialdemokratiska Studentförbundet [sʊsɪˈɑ̂ːldɛmʊˌkrɑːtɪska stɵˈdɛ̂nːtfœrˌbɵndɛt]; S-Studenter) is the student organisation of the Swedish Social Democratic Party. abbr. SSF, the acronym is most commonly used in international organisations such as IUSY or YES.

Created again in 1990, the organisation today has about 2000 members spread out over the country, most of them students at either universities or poly-technics.

The Social Democratic Students of Sweden focuses on questions connected to higher education but also organises seminars and debates on various topics such as: international affairs, gender equality, discrimination and equality at the labour market. In recent years the organisation has become a strong voice in the ideological debate within the Swedish Labour Movement. The Social Democratic Students of Sweden was the first social democratic organisation to argue for a Swedish EU (EC) membership and also the first to call for a common European currency. The organisation also has a strong relationship with the movement for democracy in Myanmar, with which it has worked in partnership with since 1996.

== Chairpersons ==
- 1990–1992: Ola S. Svensson
- 1992–1993: Jesper Bengtsson
- 1993–1994: Monica Lövström
- 1994–1995: David Samuelsson
- 1995–1997: Åsa Kullgren
- 1997–1999: Björn Andersson
- 1999–2000: Christer Pettersson
- 2000–2001: Malin Cederfeldt
- 2001–2003: Åsa Westlund
- 2003–2005: Eric Sundström
- 2005–2007: Magdalena Streijffert
- 2007–2010: Kajsa Borgnäs
- 2010–2013: Magnus Nilsson
- 2013–2015: Talla Alkurdi
- 2015–2017: Elin Ylvasdotter
- 2017–2019: Nasra Ali
- 2019–2021: Malin Malm
- 2021–2023: Emma Fastesson Lindgren
- 2023–present: Elfva Barrio

== Secretary generals ==
- 1970 Martin Lindblomd
- 1992–1993: Monica Lövström
- 1993–1995: Stefan Sjöqvist
- 1995–1997: Susanne Lindberg
- 1997–1999: Therese Svanström
- 1999–2001: Caroline Nyberg
- 2001–2003: Kikki Göransson
- 2003–2005: Magdalena Streijffert
- 2005–2006: Axel Björneke
- 2007–2010: Daniel Gullstrand
- 2010–2012: Axel Lindersson
- 2012–2013: Eleonore Eriksson
- 2013–2015: Sverker Falk-Lissel
- 2015–2018: Johanna Mårtensson
- 2018–2020: Anton Jordås
- 2020–2023: Henrik Svensson
- 2023–ff: Alma Hedmark
