= Movement of Young Socialists =

Socialist Party of Belgium's youth organisation

Movement of Young Socialists Mouvement des Jeunes Socialistes
- Headquarters: Belgium
- Ideology: Social democracy Left-wing populism Democratic socialism
- Mother party: Socialist Party
- International affiliation: International Union of Socialist Youth
- European affiliation: Young European Socialists
- Website: jeunes-socialistes.be

The Movement of Young Socialists (French: Mouvement des Jeunes Socialistes, MJS) or simply Jeunes Socialistes is the youth organisation of the Socialist Party of Belgium.

The MJS is member of the Young European Socialists (YES) and International Union of Socialist Youth (IUSY).
