= Socialist Youth of Spain =

Spanish youth party

Socialist Youth of Spain Juventudes Socialistas de España
- Founded: 1906; 1961 (reconstituted)
- Headquarters: Madrid, Spain
- Membership: 12,244
- Ideology: Social democracy Republicanism; Pro-Europeanism
- Mother party: Spanish Socialist Workers' Party
- International affiliation: International Union of Socialist Youth
- European affiliation: Young European Socialists
- Spanish affiliation: Spanish Youth Council
- Website: www.jse.org

Socialist Youth of Spain (Spanish: Juventudes Socialistas de España, JSE) is the youth organisation of the Spanish Socialist Workers' Party (PSOE) in Spain. Headquartered in Madrid, the organization was founded in 1906 and is aligned internationally with the Young European Socialists and the International Union of Socialist Youth.

Autonomous from the PSOE, one of the distinguishing marks of the organization is the demand for a republic in Spain.

== Presidents ==
- Víctor Camino Miñana (?–present)
