= All Burma Students League =

Burmese youth organization

The All Burma Students League is a Burmese pro-democracy youth organisation. It was outlawed by Myanmar's then-ruling military junta after its founding and operates in-exile in New Delhi, India. The organisation is a participatory member of the International Union of Socialist Youth.
