= Young Meretz =

Israeli political party youth wing

- Chairman: Eliran Bykhovsky
- Mother party: Meretz
- International affiliation: International Union of Socialist Youth (IUSY)
- European affiliation: Young European Socialists (YES)
- Website: meretz.org.il/young/

Young Meretz (Hebrew: צעירי מרצ, romanized: Tzeiri Meretz) is the young adult wing of the Israeli political party Meretz. All members of Meretz aged 18–35 are automatically members of YM. Additionally, YM activates student groups in university and college campuses throughout Israel, where the activists are not necessarily registered members of the mother party. YMY is subject to the guidelines and statutes of the mother party, but also enjoy a substantial extent of autonomy. For example, it is not bound by coalition agreements.

YM is committed to issues that include reaching a peaceful solution to the Arab–Israeli conflict based on a two-state solution through negotiation such as The Geneva Initiative, social justice, human rights, gender equality and minority rights.

The chairman of YM is Tomer Reznik.

YM is a member organization of the International Union of Socialist Youth (IUSY).
