= Young Social Democrats (Slovakia) =

Social democratic youth organization in Slovakia

Young Social Democrats Mladí sociálni demokrati
- President: Igor Melicher
- Founded: 2002
- Headquarters: Bratislava, Slovakia
- Ideology: Social democracy
- Mother party: Direction – Social Democracy
- National affiliation: Youth Council of Slovakia (RMS)
- International affiliation: International Union of Socialist Youth
- European affiliation: Young European Socialists
- Website: msdsr.sk

Young Social Democrats (Slovak: Mladí sociálni demokrati, MSD) is a social-democratic youth organization in Slovakia connected to the political party Direction – Social Democracy.

== History ==
MSD was founded in 2002 from the merger of Social Democratic Youth of Slovakia (SDMS) and Young Democratic Left (MDL). While formally an independent organization, MSD has strengthened its ties with the social democratic Smer party by signing a pact on mutual cooperation in 2008.

== Political position ==
MSD focuses on promoting democratic participation, the rule of law, ecological behaviour. It is strongly supportive of the European Union and strives for economic development cushioned by a welfare state.

The organisation has courted controversy amongst other social democratic youth organisations for its support for Robert Fico, the current prime minister of Slovakia, who is known for his opposition to immigration and other political positions.
