= Workers' Youth League =

The Workers' Youth League may refer to:

- Workers' Youth League (Norway) (Arbeidernes Ungdomsfylking, 1927–present)
- Workers' Youth League (Sweden) (Arbetarnas Ungdomsförbund, 1924–1926)
