= Akbayan Youth =

Arm of the Akbayan political party

Akbayan! Youth
- Chairperson: Justine Balane
- Secretary General: Khylla Meneses
- Founded: 2007
- Headquarters: Quezon City, Philippines
- Ideology: Social democracy; Democratic socialism; Progressivism
- Position: Centre-left to left-wing
- Mother party: Akbayan Citizens' Action Party
- International affiliation: International Union of Socialist Youth
- Asian affiliation: Young Progressives of Southeast Asia
- Website: Akbayan Youth on Facebook

Akbayan! Youth (A!Y) is the youth wing of the Akbayan Citizens' Action Party, a democratic socialist and progressive political party in the Philippines.

As a collective of youth activists and different youth organizations, A!Y has been in existence since 1998 alongside its mother party. In 2007, A!Y held its Founding Congress where its first set of national officers were elected, a general program of action approved, and its constitution and bylaws were ratified. A!Y counts approximately 8,000 members present in most cities and provinces across the Philippines.

== Ideology ==
A!Y's ideology is centered on six key principles:

- Democracy (the right of every young Filipino to meaningful participation in political processes; pluralism, equality and empowerment of the marginalized).
- Equity (the right of every Filipino to accessible, quality and relevant education, decent employment and adequate health services; free association; belief on the strength of the people to end all forms of exploitation and achieve social change).
- Humanism and secularism (fullest dignity due to all peoples across and within generations, ethnicity, gender, nations, attendant cultures; relationship with Mother Earth; and self-expression and self-realization against social alienation).
- Internationalism (end to violent conflicts among nation-states all over the globe; international cooperation towards peace, development and justice; solidarity among the world’s peoples especially the young people, social movements and toilers’ parties; partaking in broad actions to end all forms of colonial, imperial adventures and unilateralism of the most powerful nation-states).
- Socialist feminism (the liberation of women through working to end the economic and cultural sources of women's oppression).
- Eco-socialism (protecting the environment and its common natural resources against environmental degradation through curbing and dismantling the excesses of capitalism, globalism and imperialism).
