= Social Democratic Youth (Romania) =

Social Democratic Youth Tineretul Social Democrat (TSD)
- President: Nicolae Bănicioiu
- Secretary General: Andrei Iucinu
- Headquarters: Bucharest, Romania
- Ideology: Social democracy
- Mother party: Social Democratic Party (PSD)
- International affiliation: International Union of Socialist Youth
- European affiliation: Young European Socialists
- Website: tsd.ro

The Social Democratic Youth (Romanian: Tineretul Social Democrat, TSD) is the youth organisation of the Social Democratic Party (PSD) of Romania.
