= Young Social Democrats (Estonia) =

Political youth organization based in Estonia

Young Social Democrats Noored Sotsiaaldemokraadid (NS)
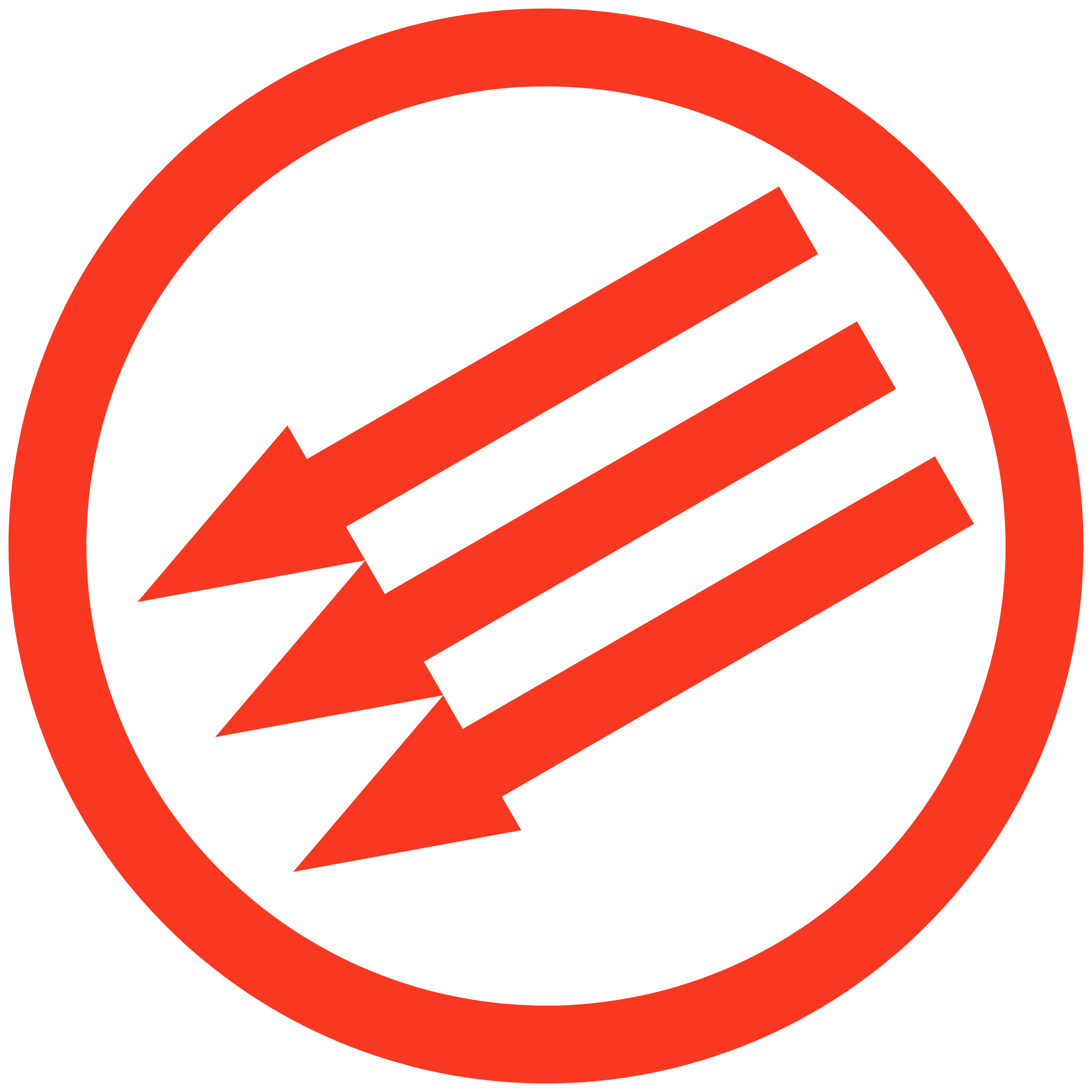
- President: Markus Meier
- Vice President: Alisa Sinani, Liisa Kivilaan
- Founded: 1992
- Headquarters: Tallinn, Estonia, European Union
- Ideology: Democratic socialism Social democracy Pro-Europeanism; Progressivism
- Mother party: Social Democratic Party
- International affiliation: International Union of Socialist Youth
- European affiliation: Young European Socialists
- Website: noorsots.ee

The Estonian Social Democratic Youth (Estonian: Noored Sotsiaaldemokraadid, colloquially Noorsotsid) is the youth wing organisation of the Social Democratic Party of Estonia. The organisation has been a member of the International Union of Socialist Youth since 1996 and a member of the Young European Socialists since 2001. The current president is Markus Meier and the vice presidents are Alisa Sinani and Liisa Kivilaan.

== Ideology ==
The political program of the Young Social Democrats prioritizes equality, justice and solidarity. Their goal is a democratic and balanced society which guarantees all people equal rights, opportunities, and means of self-actualization. They envision a world where human rights are unwavering, society follows humanistic values, and cooperation along common interests is fostered among all people and serves as a keystone of society. They Young Social Democrats believe in social justice, caring for all members of society, and creating a strong sense of security. They stand for a socially-funded healthcare system, where everyone can receive medical care according to their needs, without having to pay for a doctor's appointment. Such a system is guaranteed by the employer's monthly payment of social tax, of which 13 percent goes to health insurance funds.

The two overarching goals of the Young Social Democrats are to promote the social democratic way of thinking and to educate the members of their organization in order to make them full-fledged citizens who understand how society works and care about its progress.

== History ==
The party got its name on 3 May 2003. The former name was the Youth Moderates (Noored Mõõdukad) in 1998–2003 when the Estonian Social Democratic Youth Union (Eesti Sotsiaaldemokraatlik Noorteliit) and Young Centrists (Noored Tsentristid) united. Eesti Sotsiaaldemokraatlik Noorteliit was formed on 12 December 1992 as the youth wing of the Estonian Social Democratic Party. Noored Tsentristid was the youth wing of the Estonian Rural Centre Party (Eesti Maa-Keskerakond). In 2000, the youth wing of the Estonian People's Party (Eesti Rahvaerakond) called Vox was united with the Youth Moderates, since their mother parties had also united.

== Clubs ==
As per the founding charter of the organization, youth association clubs are formed with members active in counties, cities or municipalities. The club's board consists of the leader and members of the board elected by the club's general assembly. The working format of the club's board is a meeting, which takes place at least once a month, except for the month of July. The club leaders convene and conduct club board meetings, and if necessary, announce the club's general assemblies. The most authoritative decision-making process of the club is the general assembly (a meeting where all club members are invited and can vote), which is assembled by the board at least once a year. The content of these meetings—the clubs' general assemblies and board meetings—are recorded.

The Young Social Democrats have the Tallinn club, which is led by Ako Monticelli; the Tartu club, led by Romet Soer; Viljandi club, led by Aleksandra Kena; and the Rapla club led by Sarpedon Hüseyin Altan.

== Presidents ==
- Ardo Ojasalu (1992–1994)
- Peep Peterson (1994–1998)
- Rene Tammist (1998–2001)
- Jarno Laur (2001–2003)
- Jörgen Siil (2003–2004)
- Randel Länts (2004–2005)
- Gerri Lesk (2005–2006)
- Vallo-Andreas Hallik (2006–2008)
- Kairit Kolsar (Pohla) (2008–2009)
- Heiki Järveveer (2009–2011)
- Lauri Läänemets (2011-2013)
- Elis Tootsman (2013-2014)
- Karl Kirt (2014-2015)
- Maris Sild (2015-2016)
- Monika Maljukov (2016-2018)
- Joosep Vimm (2018-2020)
- Õnne Paulus (2020-2022)
- Eliis Lelov (2022-2022)
- Õnne Paulus (2022-2023)
- Maris Neeno (2023-2026)
- Markus Meier (2026-...)

== See also ==
- Politics of Estonia
