= Young Socialists (Netherlands) =

Young Socialists in the PvdA Jonge Socialisten in de PvdA
- Chairperson: Boyd Angenent
- Founded: 1977
- Dissolved: 1 July 2026
- Merged into: PROTEST
- Headquarters: The Hague, Netherlands
- Membership: approx. 2500
- Ideology: Social democracy
- Mother party: Labour Party (PvdA)
- International affiliation: International Union of Socialist Youth
- European affiliation: Young European Socialists
- Website: js.nl

The Young Socialists in the PvdA (Dutch: Jonge Socialisten in de PvdA, JS) is a Dutch social-democratic youth organisation. The JS is a politically independent organisation, but is affiliated with the Labour Party (PvdA). Members must be between 12 and 28 years old. Members are not required to be a member of the Labour Party.

JS used to be a democratic socialist organisation that promotes the full participation of young people in society. Since 2007 however, the JS has adapted social democracy as their ideology, calling for "a peaceful and just world with happy and committed people."

The JS has a very diverse and active memberbase and is entirely run by young people. They organise trainings on different topics ranging from intercultural learning, European integration, human rights, theater, etc. They have debates, public awareness campaigns and excursions and also publish their own magazine, called LAVA.

JS is a member organisation of International Union of Socialist Youth and Young European Socialists.

Following the 2025 decision by the Labour Party (PvdA) and GroenLinks to merge into the unified party Progressief Nederland (PRO), their respective youth wings, the Young Socialists and DWARS, announced a formal merger. On March 28, 2026, a joint congress of both organizations approved PROTEST as the name for the new organization. PROTEST is scheduled to be officially established at a founding congress in the summer of 2026.

== List of Chairpersons ==
- 2025-present: Boyd Angenent
- 2024-2025: Jasmijn Hofman
- 2023-2024: Iris Vrolijks
- 2022-2023: Bob den Ouden
- 2022: Lukas van Dongen
- 2020-2022: Andrej van Hout
- 2019-2020: Luna Koops
- 2018-2019: Twan Wilmes
- 2016-2018: Lieke Kuiper
- 2014-2016: Bart van Bruggen
- 2012-2014: Toon Geenen
- 2011-2012: Rick Jonker
- 2010-2011: Jelle Menges
- 2009-2010: Mohammed Mohandis
- 2008-2009: Sven Stevenson
- 2007-2008: Michiel Emmelkamp
- 2006-2007: Peter Scheffer
- 2005-2006: Ruben Zandvliet
- 2004-2005: Remy Wilshaus
- 2003-2004: Loes Ypma
- 2002-2003: Servaz van Berkum
- 2001-2002: Jasper Fastl
- 2000-2001: Sander Zboray
- 1999-2000: Eddy Bekkers
- 1997-1999: Omar Ramadan
- 1996-1997: Fanny Bod
- 1994-1996: Tjeerd van Dekken
- 1992-1994: Sharon Dijksma
- 1990-1992: Mark de Koning
- 1988-1990: Marcel Hoogland
- 1986-1988: Erwino Ouwerkerk
- 1983-1986: Michiel Zonneveld
- 1982-1983: Margo Vliegenthart
- 1979-1982: Rob van Gijzel
- 1977-1979: Felix Rottenberg
