= Socialist Youth Union (Bulgaria) =

The Socialist Youth Union (Bulgarian: Съюз на социалистическата младеж, SSM) was a youth organization in Bulgaria, founded in 1921. SSM was the youth wing of the Bulgarian Social Democratic Workers Party.
