= Socialist Youth League (Sweden) =

Former political group

The Socialist Youth League (Socialistiska Ungdomsförbundet, SUF) of Sweden was founded in Stockholm in 1897. The SUF soon attracted "radical" elements who stood in opposition to social democratic leaders. In 1903, part of the organisation split off to become the Social Democratic Youth League. The remainder of the SUF formed the backbone of the Young Socialists, founded in 1908.

Notable members included Albert Jensen, who went on to found the Central Organisation of the Workers of Sweden in 1910.
