= Arne Sejr =

Danish resistance member (1922–1998)

Arne Sejr (Danish pronunciation: [ˈsɑjˀɐ]; 31 January 1922 – July 1998) was a member of the resistance and became involved in anti-communist activities after the War.

One of these activities was the set-up of a private intelligence organization, "The Firm" (Firmaet), in 1948, involved in PSYOPS against communist targets. One of these targets was the eavesdropping of leaders within the Danmarks Kommunistiske Parti (DKP). The firm managed to bug the apartment of communist vice-chairman Alfred Jensen for several years from the apartment below. Sejr's organization also produced "black letters," to stir up paranoia in the party. The DKP was further damaged by the defection of Aksel Larsen, who then formed his own political party in 1959, the Socialistisk Folkeparti (SF). Larsen, who had become disillusioned with communism at that time, co-engineered his defection with the Central Intelligence Agency, with contacts established by a member of The Firm, which already enjoyed a working relationship with the CIA.

Although The Firm was disbanded in 1963, its eavesdropping program was revealed at the end of 1975, by former prime minister Jens Otto Krag.
