= Social Democratic Youth (Finland) =

Politically aligned youth organisation in Finland

Social Democratic Youth Sosialidemokraattiset Nuoret
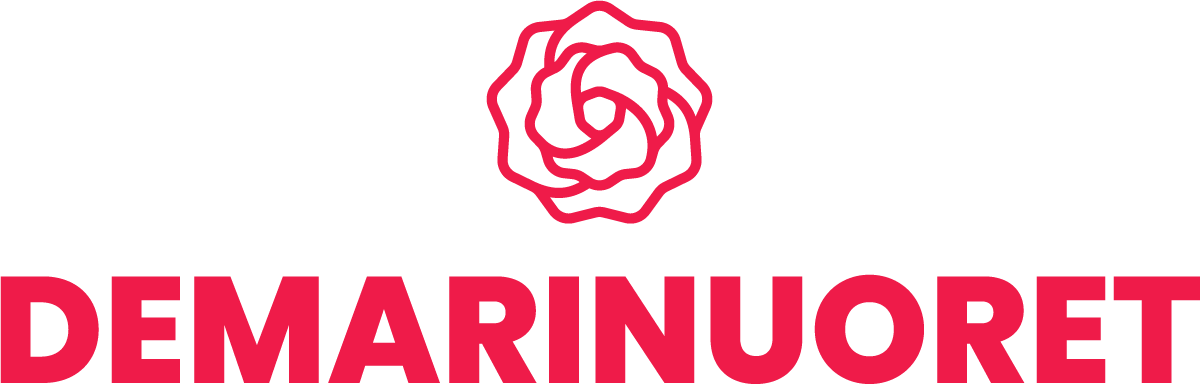
- Chairperson: Julia Väänänen
- Secretary General: Sara Salonen
- Founded: 1959
- Split from: Social Democratic Youth League of Finland
- Headquarters: Helsinki, Finland
- Mother party: Social Democratic Party of Finland
- International affiliation: International Union of Socialist Youth
- European affiliation: Young European Socialists
- Nordic affiliation: Forbundet Nordens Socialdemokratiske Ungdom (FNSU)
- Magazine: Lippu (ISSN 0785-5850)
- Website: demarinuoret.fi

The Social Democratic Youth (Finnish: Sosialidemokraattiset Nuoret, also known as Demarinuoret) is the youth organisation of the Social Democratic Party of Finland. The organisation has 5,000 members. In the 1970s they had 40,000 members.

The organisation was founded in 1959 as a breakoff faction from the Social Democratic Youth League of Finland (SSN, founded 1921), which aligned with the SDP’s opposition, the Social Democratic Union of Workers and Smallholders. The original name of the league was Central League of Social Democratic Youth (Sosialidemokraattisen Nuorison Keskusliitto, SNK). Most of the old SSN members and sections soon joined the SNK.

The Social Democratic Youth is a member of Young European Socialists (YES), the International Union of Socialist Youth (IUSY) and the Nordic Committee of Co-operating Social Democratic Youth (FNSU). The Social Democratic Youth has 14 district organisations and one Swedish section, Finlands svenska unga socialdemokrater (FSUD). Nationwide members of the league include the youth organisations of Finnish Metalworkers' Union and Trade Union for the Public and Welfare Sectors.

Since 1972, Lippu (ISSN 0785-5850) has been the organ of the league. It was preceded by Kuriiri (1971) and Nuorin Siivin (1958–1970).
