= Young European Socialists =

European social democratic youth association

- President: João Martins Pereira
- Vice President: Aleksandra Iwanowska; Rachid Khenissi; Anne Pilgaard; Karlo Vedak; Kristina Scepanovic; Ines João Rodrigues; Eli Harris; George Tsoumas; Juan Diego Romero Pinas; Christopher Lindvall
- Founded: 1992
- Headquarters: Rue Guimard 10-12; 1040 Brussels, Belgium
- Ideology: Social democracy
- Mother party: Party of European Socialists
- International affiliation: International Union of Socialist Youth; Party of European Socialists; Progressive Alliance
- Website: youngsocialists.eu

Young European Socialists (YES), formerly the European Community Organisation of Socialist Youth (ECOSY), is an association of social democratic youth organisations in Europe and the European Union.

YES is the youth organisation of the Party of European Socialists (PES) and is a sister organization of the International Union of Socialist Youth (IUSY). The seat of the organisation is Brussels.

Full members status is held to the European Youth Forum (YFJ) which operates within the Council of Europe and European Union areas and works closely with both these bodies.

== History ==
YES was founded as the European Community Organisation of Socialist Youth (ECOSY) in November 1992 in Oegstgeest/The Hague. The preparatory committee consisted of Philip Cordery (MJS, France), Joris Jurriëns (JS-PvdA, Netherlands), Jens Geier (Jusos, Germany), Giustina Magistretti (Italy), and Pascal Smet (Belgium).

Before 1992 the European activities had been coordinated inside IUSY, especially in the European Leaders Meeting.

The European Socialist Youth (ESY), founded in parallel, was only a weak organisation, a short time later renamed the European Committee, one of the IUSY continental committees.

The organisation's name was changed to Young European Socialists (YES) at the 11th Congress in Bommersvik in 2013.

== Affiliated organisations ==
=== Full members ===
- Albania – Forum of Eurosocialist Youth of Albania (FRESSH) also Youth Movement for Integration (LRI)
- Albania – YMI Albania
- Armenia – Armenian Youth Federation (ՀԵԴ)
- Austria – Sozialistische Jugend Österreich (SJÖ)
- Austria – Verband Sozialistischer StudentInnen Österreichs (VSStÖ)
- Belgium – Jongsocialisten (JS)
- Belgium – Mouvement des Jeunes Socialistes (JS)
- Bosnia and Herzegovina – Forum Mladih SDP / Social Democratic Youth (SDY)
- Bulgaria – Европейска лява младежка алтернатива (ЕЛМА) / European Left Youth Alternative (ELYA)
- Bulgaria – Младежко Обединение БСП (МБСП) / BSP Youth Union (BSPYU)
- Croatia – SDP Youth Forum (FM SDP)
- Cyprus – EDEK Youth
- Cyprus – Republican Turkish Party (CTP) Youth
- Czech Republic – Mladí Sociální Demokraté (MSD)
- Denmark – Danmarks Socialdemokratiske Ungdom (DSU)
- Estonia – Social Democratic Youth (SDY)
- Finland – Social Democratic Youth (SDY)
- Finland – Sosialidemokraattiset Opiskelijat (SONK)
- France – Les Jeunes Socialistes (JS)
- Germany – Jusos in der SPD
- Greece – PASOK Youth
- Hungary – Societas
- Iceland – Ungt Jafnaðarfólk (UJ)
- Ireland – Labour Youth
- Italy – Giovani Democratici (GD)
- Italy – Federazione dei Giovani Socialisti (FGS)
- Latvia – Jauniešu organizācija Restart.lv
- Lithuania – Lithuanian Social Democratic Youth Union (LSDYU)
- Luxembourg – Jeunesses Socialistes Luxembourgeoises (JSL)
- Malta – Żgħażagħ Laburisti (ŻL)
- Montenegro – Youth Council of Democratic party of socialists (YCDPS)
- Montenegro – SDY Montenegro
- Netherlands – Jonge Socialisten in de PvdA (JS)
- North Macedonia – Social Democratic Youth (SDY)
- Poland – Federacja Młodych Socjaldemokratów (FMS)
- Portugal – Juventude Socialista (JS)
- Romania – Tineretul Social Democrat (TSD)
- Serbia – Democratic Youth (DY)
- Serbia – Social Democratic Youth (SDY)
- Serbia – League of Social Democrats of Vojvodina Youth (LSVO)
- Slovakia – Mladí sociálni demokrati (MSD)
- Slovenia – Mladi forum Socialnih demokratov (Mladi forum SD)
- Spain – Joventut Socialista de Catalunya (JSC)
- Spain – Juventudes Socialistas de España (JSE)
- Sweden – Sveriges Socialdemokratiska Ungdomsförbund (SSU)
- Sweden – Socialdemokratiska Studentförbundet (SSF)
- Switzerland – JungsozialistInnen Schweiz / Jeunesse socialiste suisse / Gioventù Socialista Svizzera (JUSO/JS/GS)
- Turkey – CHP Gençlik Kolları
- United Kingdom – Young Labour
- United Kingdom – National Labour Students United Kingdom
- United Kingdom (Northern Ireland) – SDLP Youth
- United Kingdom – Young Fabians (YF)

=== Observers ===
- Belarus – Maladaja Hramada
- Cyprus – Αγώνας / Agonas
- Egypt – ESDP Youth Egypt
- Faroe Islands - SU Faroe Islands
- Georgia (country) – Young Socialists Georgia (YSG)
- Hungary – Democratic Dynamism Hungary
- Israel – Young Meretz, Meretz Youth
- Kosovo – Rinia për Vetëvendosje
- Lebanon – Progressive Youth Organization (PYO)
- Norway – Arbeidernes ungdomsfylking (AUF)
- Palestine – Fatah Youth
- Russia – Российский социал-демократический союз молодёжи (РСДСМ) / Russian Social-Democratic Union of Youth (RSDYU)
- Tunisia – Jeunes Socialistes Démocrates (JSD)
- Ukraine – SD Platform
- Ukraine – Union of Young Socialists (SMS)

== Presidents ==
Since the founding of ECOSY in 1992 until 1997, the presidency rotated simultaneously with the EU Presidency

- 1992 Tracy Paul (Young Labour)
- 1993 Henrik Sass Larsen (Danmarks Socialdemokratiske Ungdom)
- 1993 Ronald Gossiaux (Mouvement des Jeunes Socialistes / Belgium)
- 1994 Vasilis Togias (Neolaia Pasok)
- 1994 Reinhold Rünker (Jusos in der SPD)
- 1995 Renaud Lagrave (Mouvement des Jeunes Socialistes)
- 1995 Martin Guillermo (Juventudes Socialistas de España)
- 1995 Paco-Luis Benitez (Juventudes Socialistas de España)
- 1996 Vinicio Peluffo (Sinistra Giovanile)
- 1996 Mick McLoughlin (Labour Youth)
- 1997 Thomas Windmulder (Jonge Socialisten in de PvdA)

Afterwards, ECOSY has an elected president

- 1997–1999 Andreas Schieder (Sozialistische Jugend Österreich)
- 1999–2001 Hugues Nancy (Mouvement des Jeunes Socialistes)
- 2001–2003 Jan Krims (Verband Sozialistischer StudentInnen Österreichs)
- 2003–2005 Anders Lindberg (Sveriges Socialdemokratiska Ungdomsförbund)
- 2005–2009 Giacomo Filibeck (Sinistra Giovanile)
- 2009–2011 Petroula Nteledimou (Neolaia PASOK)
- 2011–2015 Kaisa Penny (Demarinuoret & SONK)
- 2015–2017 Laura Slimani (Mouvement des Jeunes Socialistes)
- 2017–2019 Joao Albuquerque (Juventude Socialista)
- 2019–2023 Alícia Homs (Juventudes Socialistas de España)
- 2023–2025 Enric López Jurado (Joventut Socialista de Catalunya)
- 2025–present João Martins Pereira (Les Jeunes Socialistes)

== Secretaries General ==
- 1992–1997 Philip Cordery (Mouvement des Jeunes Socialistes / France)
- 1997–1999 Pau Solanilla (Juventudes Socialistas de España)
- 1999–2003 Yonnec Polet (Mouvement des Jeunes Socialistes / Belgium)
- 2003–2005 Ilias Antoniou (Neolaia Pasok)
- 2005–2009 Ania Skrzypek (Federacja Młodych Socjaldemokratów)
- 2009–2011 Janna Besamusca (Jonge Socialisten in de PvdA)
- 2011–2015 Thomas Maes (Jongsocialisten; ex Animo)
- 2015–2017 Nina Živanović (SDY in SDU)
- 2017–2019 Tuulia Pitkänen (Sosialidemokraattiset Nuoret)
- 2019–2020 Maj Christensen Jensen (Danmarks Socialdemokratiske Ungdom)
- 2020–2023 Ana Pirtskhalava (Young Socialists Georgia)
- 2023–2025 Sofie Amalie Stage (Danmarks Socialdemokratiske Ungdom)
- 2025–2026 Irja Vaateri (Demarinuoret)
- 2026-present Mariam Asghari (Sveriges Socialdemokratiska Ungdomsförbund)

== Congresses ==
- 1992 : Oegstgeest/The Hague
- 1994 : Munich
- 1997 : Strasbourg
- 1999 : Toledo
- 2001 : Vienna
- 2003 : Bommersvik (Sweden)
- 2005 : Cascais (Portugal)
- 2007 : Warsaw
- 2009 : Brussels
- 2011 : Bucharest
- 2013 : Bommersvik (Sweden)
- 2015 : Winterthur
- 2017 : Duisburg
- 2019 : Helsinki
- 2021 : Malta
- 2023 : Barcelona
- 2025 : Massy

== Summer camps ==
- 1995 Rimini (Italy)
- 1996 Iusy Festival Bonn
- 1997 Mazagón (Spain)
- 1998 Vienna (Austria)
- 1999 Livorno (Italy)
- 2000 Iusy Festival Malmö
- 2001 Debrecen (Hungary)
- 2002 Weißenbach (Austria)
- 2003 Iusy Festival Kamena Vourla (Greece)
- 2004 Năvodari (Romania)
- 2005 Figueira da Foz (Portugal)
- 2006 Iusy Festival Alicante
- 2007 Iusy100 Berlin
- 2008 Carpentras (France)
- 2009 Iusy Festival Zánka (Hungary)
- 2011 Iusy Festival Weißenbach (Austria)
- 2012 Savudrija (Croatia) The Declaration
- 2013 Foça (Turkey)
- 2014 Iusy Festival Ghajn Tuffieha (Malta)
- 2015 Santa Cruz (Torres Vedras) (Portugal)
- 2016 Palermo (Italy)
- 2018 Rota (Spain)
- 2019 Varna (Bulgaria)
- 2022 Vlorë (Albania)
- 2024 Santa Cruz (Torres Vedras) (Portugal)
- 2026 Warsaw (Poland)
