= Social Democratic Youth of Denmark =

Youth wing

Social Democratic Youth of Denmark Danmarks Socialdemokratiske Ungdom (DSU)
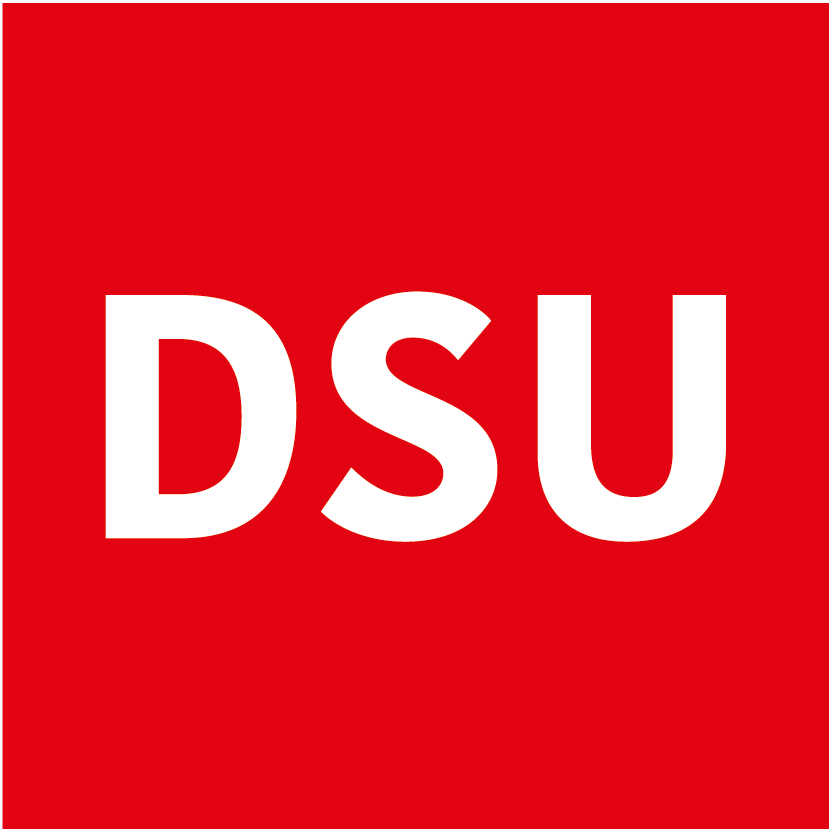
- Chairperson: Ingrid Kjærgaard
- Secretary General: Sebastian Schwartz
- Founded: 1920
- Headquarters: Ramsingsvej 30, Copenhagen, Denmark
- Ideology: Social democracy Democratic socialism
- Mother party: Social Democrats
- National affiliation: Dansk Ungdoms Fællesråd (DUF)
- International affiliation: International Union of Socialist Youth
- European affiliation: Young European Socialists
- Nordic affiliation: Forbundet Nordens Socialdemokratiske Ungdom (FNSU)
- Website: dsu.net

The Social Democratic Youth of Denmark (Danish: Danmarks Socialdemokratiske Ungdom, DSU) is the national youth wing of the Danish Social Democrats. It is not to be confused with Frit Forum, which is for those in higher education, and whose membership is not restricted by age, unlike the DSU. The organisation is autonomous from the Social Democrats and as such is entitled to formulate its own policies and devise its own campaigns.

The Social Democratic Youth movement was established in 1920 after a break-up of the former youth organisation, the Social Democratic Youth League (Socialdemokratisk Ungdomsforbund, SUF). At first, the organisation was known as the "DsU". The founders of DSU wanted to change the Danish society by gradual reforms and not by revolution.

The Social Democratic Youth of Denmark is independent of the Social Democrats. This allows them to formulate their own policies and make their own campaigns. Prominent Social Democrats beginning their political work in the Social Democratic Youth include prime ministers Hans Hedtoft, H. C. Hansen, Jens Otto Krag, Anker Jørgensen and Mette Frederiksen, as well as ministers Per Hækkerup and Morten Bødskov.

== Affiliations ==
DSU is a member of Dansk Ungdoms Fællesråd (DUF), the Forbundet Nordens Socialdemokratiske Ungdom (FNSU), the Young European Socialists (YES) and the International Union of Socialist Youth (IUSY).

== Chairs ==
The incumbent chair of Social Democratic Youth is Ingrid Kjærgaard, who was elected at the DSU 2026 Congress in May. The general secretary of the DSU is Sebastian Schwartz, who was also elected at the 2026 Congress in May.

Former DSU chairs:

- 1920–1927 Christian Christiansen
- 1927–1929 Hans Hedtoft, former Prime Minister (1948–1955)
- 1929–1933 Johannes Hansen
- 1933–1937 H. C. Hansen, former Prime Minister (1955–1960)
- 1937–1942 Poul Hansen
- 1942–1946 Victor Gram
- 1946–1952 Per Hækkerup, Foreign Minister (1962–1966)
- 1952–1958 Børge Jensen
- 1958–1961 Niels Kristensen
- 1961–1967 Ejner Hovgaard Christiansen
- 1967–1970 Hans Carl Nielsen
- 1970–1974 Niels Enevoldsen
- 1974–1978 Frode Møller Nicolaisen
- 1978–1982 Finn Larsen
- 1982–1986 Jan Petersen, former Socialist Democrat MP and mayor of Norddjurs municipality (2010–2013)
- 1986–1990 Jens Christiansen, former secretary-general for Socialdemokraterne
- 1990–1992 Anette Berentzen
- 1992–1996 Henrik Sass Larsen, MP and former political spokesman of the Social Democrats
- 1996–2000 Morten Bødskov, Social Democrat MP and former Justice Minister
- 2000–2004 Kristian Madsen, present leader writer at the Danish newspaper Politiken
- 2004–2008 Jacob Bjerregaard Jørgensen, Social Democrat MP
- 2008–2012 Peter Hummelgaard Thomsen, Social Democrat MP
- 2012–2014 Camilla Brejner Schwalbe
- 2014–2016 Alexander Grandt Pedersen
- 2016–2017 Lasse Quvang Rasmussen
- 2017–2017 Morgan Krüger
- 2017- Frederik Vad Nielsen

== Organisation ==
The legislative and most powerful assembly is the national convention, held every second year in April or May. It consists of 235 delegates, mainly elected in the local branches. The convention is approving the annual accounts of the national organisation, it is deciding new organizational work programmes, political resolutions and proposals and is finally electing a national executive committee.

The national executive committee ("Forretningsudvalget") consists of 10 elected members and also the chairperson, the vice-chairperson and the secretary general. They are elected at the convention too. The chairperson, the vice-chairperson and the secretary general are receiving an economic compensation/fee for their jobs.

Above the national executive committee, DSU has a kind of "second chamber", the major council Hovedbestyrelsen, which consists of the national executive committee (13 members) and 29 local representatives, elected in the 10 regions. The Social Democrats and Frit Forum, the Social Democrats' student wing, have one observer each. Hovedbestyrelsen is also the highest the most powerful assembly between conventions.

DSU has three different nationwide, permanent committees with members from all levels in the organization and from everywhere in Denmark. The committees have the following topics and tasks:

- Activities and seminars (planning of national events etc.) (abb. "AKU" )
- International affairs and cooperation (abb. "IU")
- Editor's group, Members' magazine ("DSU'eren")

DSU is divided into 10 regions, following the borders of the Danish major constituencies. Each region has a regional executive committee and is every year electing their local representatives to Hovedbestyrelsen.

DSU has around 60 local branches, though these may come and go at any moment and is therefore not an exact figure. The local branches are responsible for local activities and local campaigns. DSU has in the local communities an important role in the campaign work for the Social Democrats. Especially when it comes to door-to-door campaigning, inspired from the 2008 Obama election campaign, the DSU has an important role.
