= Socialist Youth (Faroe Islands) =

Socialist Youth Sosialistisk Ung
- Chairperson: Herborg Heidiardóttir Gaardlykke
- Vice-Chairperson: Eyðrið á Fløghamri
- Founded: 1965 (refounded in 2009)
- Headquarters: Tórshavn, Faroe Islands
- Ideology: Social democracy Democratic socialism
- Mother party: Social Democratic Party
- International affiliation: International Union of Socialist Youth (IUSY)
- Nordic affiliation: Forbundet Nordens Socialdemokratiske Ungdom (FNSU)
- Website: Facebook

The Socialist Youth (Faroese: Sosialistisk Ung) is the youth organization of Javnaðarflokkurin, a social democratic party in the Faroe Islands.
