= International Union of Socialist Youth =

International youth non-governmental organization

- Abbreviation: IUSY
- Founded: 24 August 1907
- Type: International youth non-governmental organization
- Purpose: World federation of socialist, social democratic and labour youth organizations
- Headquarters: Amtshausgasse 4, 1050 Vienna, Austria
- Region served: Worldwide
- Members: 136
- Official language: English, French, Spanish
- President: Sergio Amante
- Secretary General: Jessali Zarazua
- Main organ: World Congress
- Affiliations: Socialist International; Progressive Alliance; Historical: Second International; Labour and Socialist International
- Website: iusy.org

The International Union of Socialist Youth (IUSY) is an international youth labour organization, whose activities include publications, supporting member organizations and organization of meetings. Originally named the Socialist Youth International, the union was formed at the 1907 International Socialist Congress at Stuttgart as the youth wing of the Second International.

IUSY claims to have 136 member organizations from over 100 countries. IUSY gained prominence as an international youth non-governmental organization (NGO) with UN ECOSOC consultative status in 1993.

== History ==
From 24 to 27 August 1907, 21 youth representatives from 13 countries met in Stuttgart and found the Socialist Youth International as the youth organization of the Second International, headquartered in Vienna.

The Socialist Youth International held parallel congresses in 1910 and 1912 following the International Socialist Congress, Copenhagen 1910 and International Socialist Congress, Basel 1912.

The socialist youth organizations were confronted by the onset of World War I in 1914. The majority of the socialist parties supported their respective countries' war efforts, but the Socialist Youth International remained opposed to it. The organization moved its offices to Zurich and published its journal, Youth International, calling for peace (distributed illegally). This anti-war activism later became a core part of the organization.

The formation of the Communist International in Moscow in 1919 split the worldwide socialist movement into communist, socialist and social democratic wings. An alliance between the socialist and social democratic wings resulted in a return of Socialist Youth International in 1923.

After the fascist takeover of Italy, the totalitarian government barred Italian youth from being a part of the organization. This spurred action for anti-fascist causes in the organization. After the Second World War, the organization formally rebranded to become the International Union of Socialist Youth. In the 1950s and 1960s, the group supported decolonization efforts in Africa and Asia. In the 1970s, the organization fought against human rights violations by military governments in South America. Today, the group mostly focuses on economic policy.

== Activities ==
The stated goal of the International Union of Socialist Youth is to promote anti-war activities, fight climate change, and support socialist economic policies. The organization supports the UN's Sustainable Development Goals.

== Presidium and Control Commission ==
=== Presidium ===
IUSY is led by its Presidium, elected every two years at the biennial congress, with representatives from all over the world. The current members (2026–2028) are listed below:

President:

- Sergio Amante, JSE, Spain

Secretary General:

- Jessali Zarazua, JPRD Mexico, Mexico

Vice-Presidents:

- Haykel Mgaieth, JS Tunisia, Tunisia
- Hind Ksiouar, Ittihadiya Youth, Morocco
- (Eswatini) Sakhile Ncamiso, SWAYOCO, Swaziland
- (Western Sahara) Dajai Mohamed, UESARIO, Sahrawi Arab Democratic Republic
- Boneth Guayara, JL Colombia, Colombia
- Joaquín Fernández, JRM, Dominican Republic
- Ronald Graterol, JMAS, Venezuela
- Maria Panay, JRPD Panama, Panama
- Marina Hay, Young Labour, New Zealand
- Keira Diaz, Akbayan Youth, Philippines
- Paula Schmedding, JUSOS Germany, Germany
- Anastasiia Nesterova, SJD Die Falken, Germany
- André Abraão, JS Portugal, Portugal
- Pim van Benthem, JS Netherlands, Netherlands
- Tasame Ramadan, Fateh Youth Movement, Palestine
- (Kurdistan Region) Nasrin Abdalla, Kurdistan Students Association, Kurdistan (Iraq)
- (Kurdistan Region) Kamal Mohyeddini, Democratic Youth Union of East Kurdistan, Kurdistan (Iran)
- Eliran Bykhovsky, Young Meretz, Israel

=== Control Commission ===
Control Commission President
Rena Hassanieh, PYO, Lebanon
Control Commission Members
(Democratic Republic of the Congo) Cedric Mpolesha, UPDPS, DRC
Beatriz Michelini, Juventud Nuevo Espacio, Uruguay
Anel Estevez, JRM, Dominican Republic
Magnus Høgenni, SU, Faroe Islands
Permanent Invited
Young European Socialists (YES) President
ICFTU YO Secretary General

== Historical leadership ==
=== Presidents ===
- 1946–1948 Bob Molenaar (Netherlands)
- 1948–1954 Peter Strasser (Austria)
- 1954–1960 Nath Pai (India)
- (Post-independence Burma (1948–1962)) 1960–1966 Kyi Nyunt (Burma)
- (Dominion of Ceylon) 1966–1969 Wilbert Perera (Ceylon)
- 1969–1971 Luis A. Carello (Argentina)
- 1971–1973 Raphael Albuquerque (Dominican Republic)
- 1973–1975 Luis Ayala (Chile)
- 1975–1977 Jerry Svensson (Sweden)
- 1977–1979 Alejandro Montesino (Chile)
- 1979–1981 Hilary Barnard (United Kingdom)
- 1981–1983 Milton Colindres (El Salvador)
- 1983–1985 Kirsten Jensen (Denmark)
- 1985–1989 Joan Calabuig (Spain)
- 1989–1991 Sven Eric Söder (Sweden)
- 1991-1995 Roger Hällhag (Sweden)
- 1995-1997 Nicola Zingaretti (Italy)
- 1997–1999 Umberto Gentiloni (Italy)
- 1999–2004 Alvaro Elizalde (Chile)
- 2004-2008 Fikile Mbalula (South Africa)
- 2008-2010 Jacinda Ardern (New Zealand)
- 2010-2014 Viviana Piñeiro (Uruguay)
- 2014-2016 Felipe Jeldres (Chile)
- 2016-2018 Howard Lee Chuan How (Malaysia)
- 2018-2021 Johanna Ortega (Paraguay)
- 2021-2023 Jesus Tapia (Venezuela)
- 2023-2026 Hend Mgaieth (Tunisia)
- 2026 Sergio Amante (Spain)

=== Secretaries General ===
- 1946-1951 Per Hækkerup (Denmark)
- 1954-1960 Kurt Kristiansson (Sweden)
- 1960-1963 Per Aasen (Norway)
- 1963-1966 Sture Ericson (Sweden)
- 1966-1969 Jan Hækkerup (Denmark)
- 1969-1971 Bernt Carlsson (Sweden)
- 1971-1973 Jerry Svensson (Sweden)
- 1973-1975 Johan Peanberg (Sweden)
- 1975-1977 Friedrich O.J. Roll (West Germany)
- 1977-1979 Ove Fich (Denmark)
- 1979-1981 Jukka Oas (Finland)
- 1981-1983 Bengt Ohlsson (Sweden)
- 1983-1985 Robert Kredig (West Germany)
- 1985-1989 Dirk Drijbooms (Belgium)
- 1989-1993 Ricard Torrell (Spain)
- 1993-1997 Alfredo Remo Lazzeretti (Argentina)
- 1997-2001 Lisa Pelling (Sweden)
- 2001-2006 Vincenzo Amendola (Italy)
- (Republic of Ireland) 2006-2008 Yvonne O'Callaghan (Ireland)
- 2010-2012 Johan Hassel (Sweden)
- 2012-2014 Beatriz Talegón (Spain)
- 2014-2016 Evin Incir (Sweden)
- 2016-2018 Alessandro Pirisi (Italy)
- (Georgia (country)) 2018-2021 Ana Pirtskhalava (Georgia)
- 2021-2024 Bruno Gonçalves (Portugal)
- 2024-2025 Sarineh Abrahamian (Armenia)
- (Tunisia) 2025-2026 Hend Mgaieth (Acting)
- 2026 Jessali Zarazua (Mexico)

== Member organizations ==
As of November 2023, the IUSY claims to have 122 member organizations from over 100 countries, in addition to roughly two dozen observer organizations. The member countries are grouped into five regions: Africa, the Americas, Asia-Pacific, Europe, and the Middle East.

== See also ==
- List of International Union of Socialist Youth member organizations
