= 2025 Norwegian parliamentary election =

- 8 September 2025

All 169 seats in the Storting 85 seats needed for a majority
- Opinion polls
- Registered: 4,059,218 ▲4.3%
- Turnout: 3,251,828 (80.1% ▲2.9 pp)
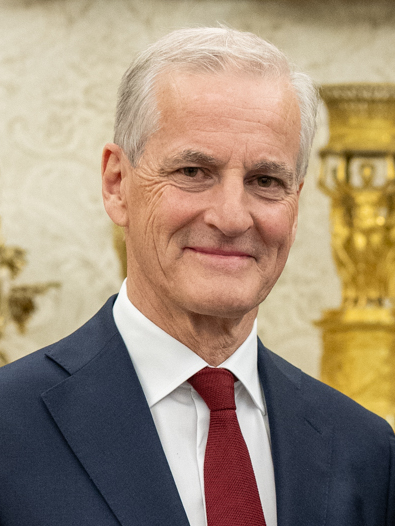

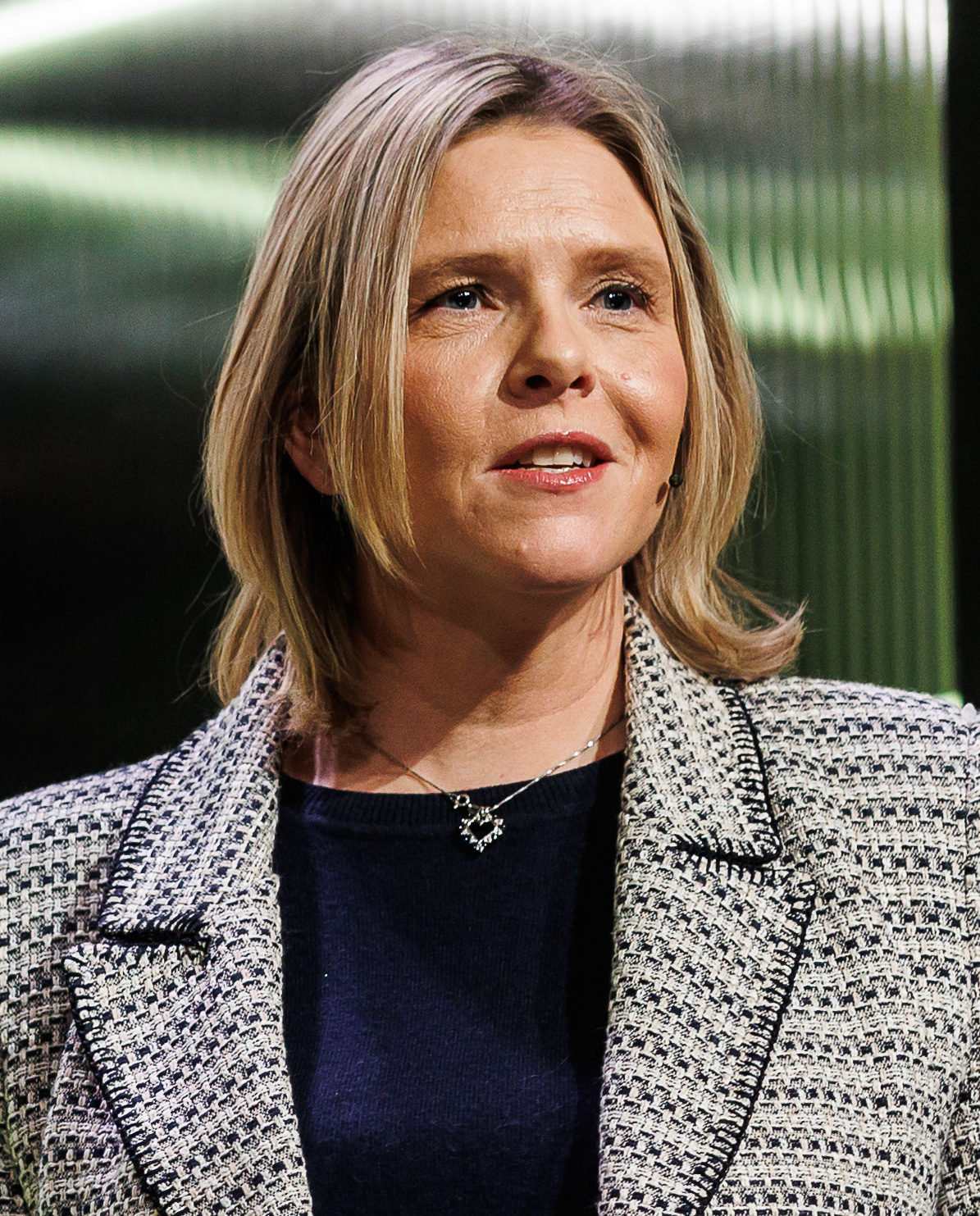

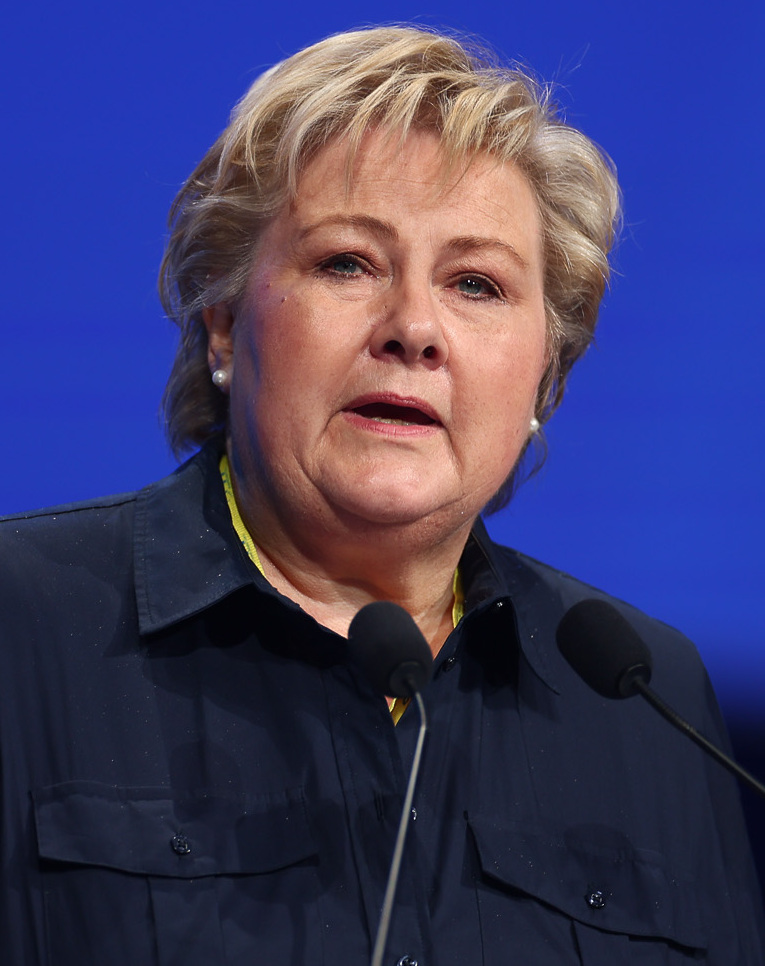

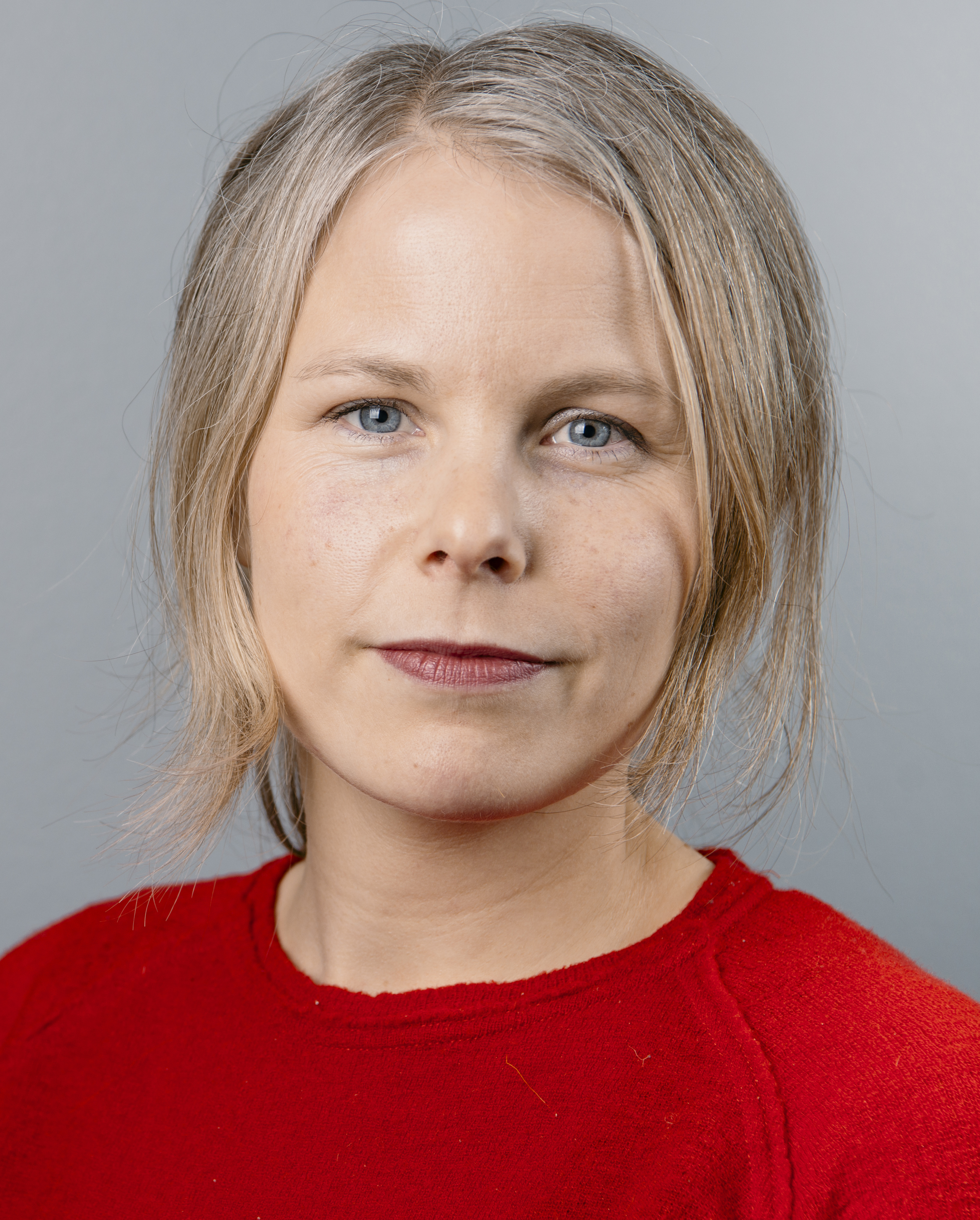

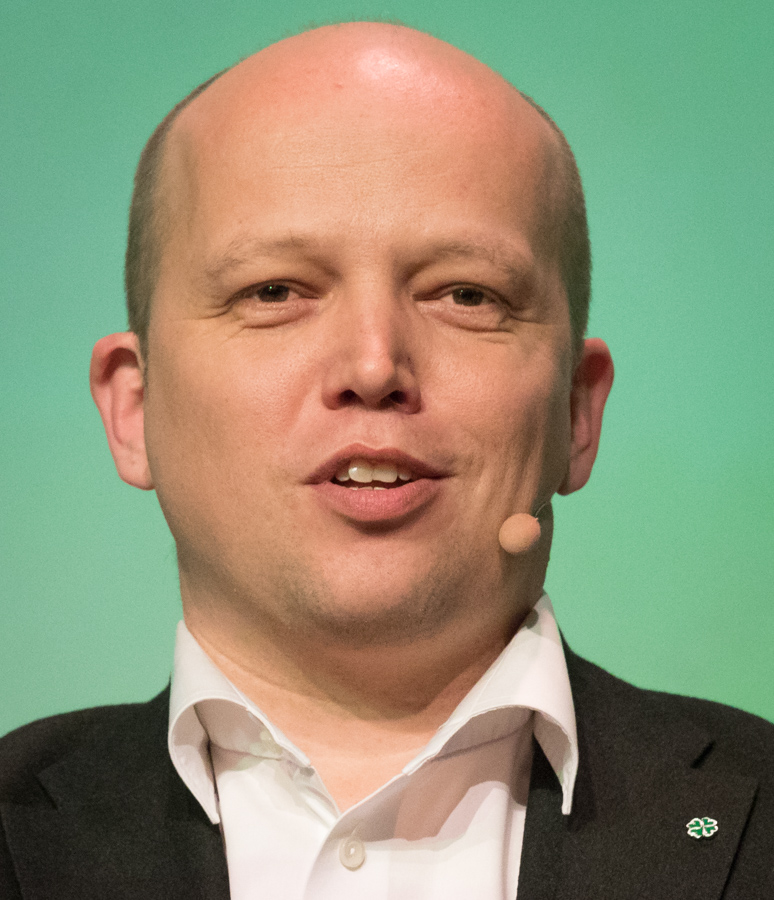

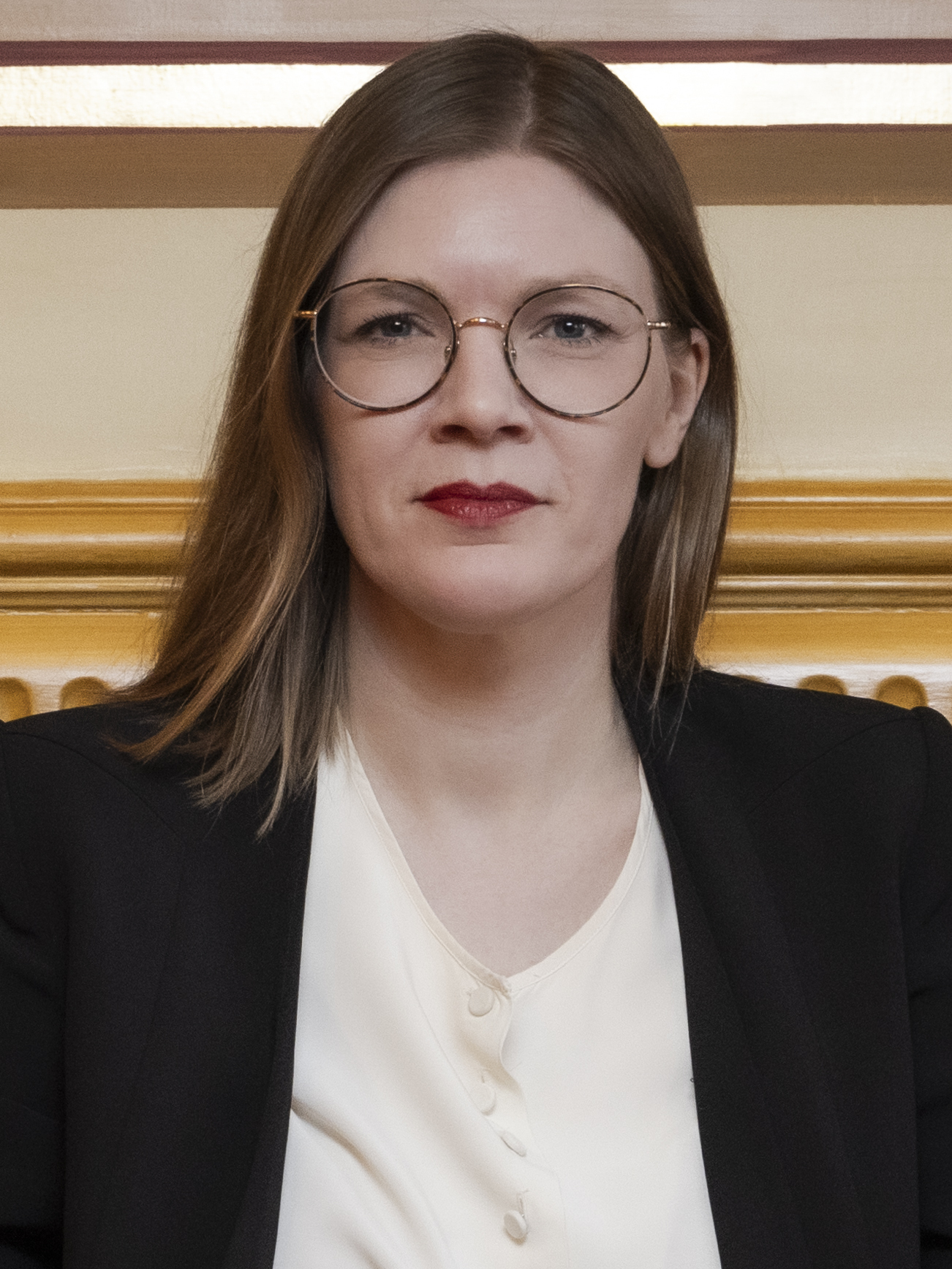

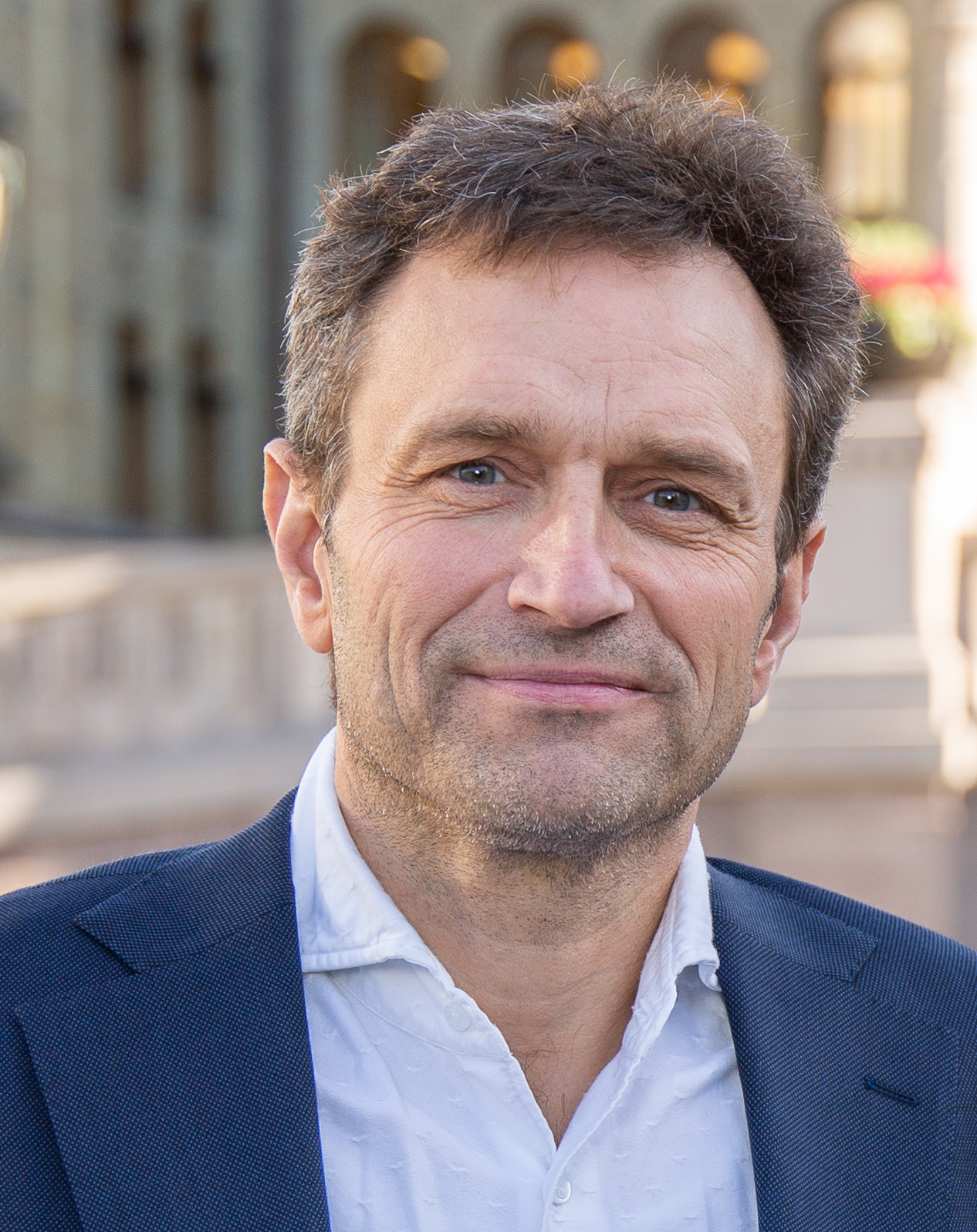

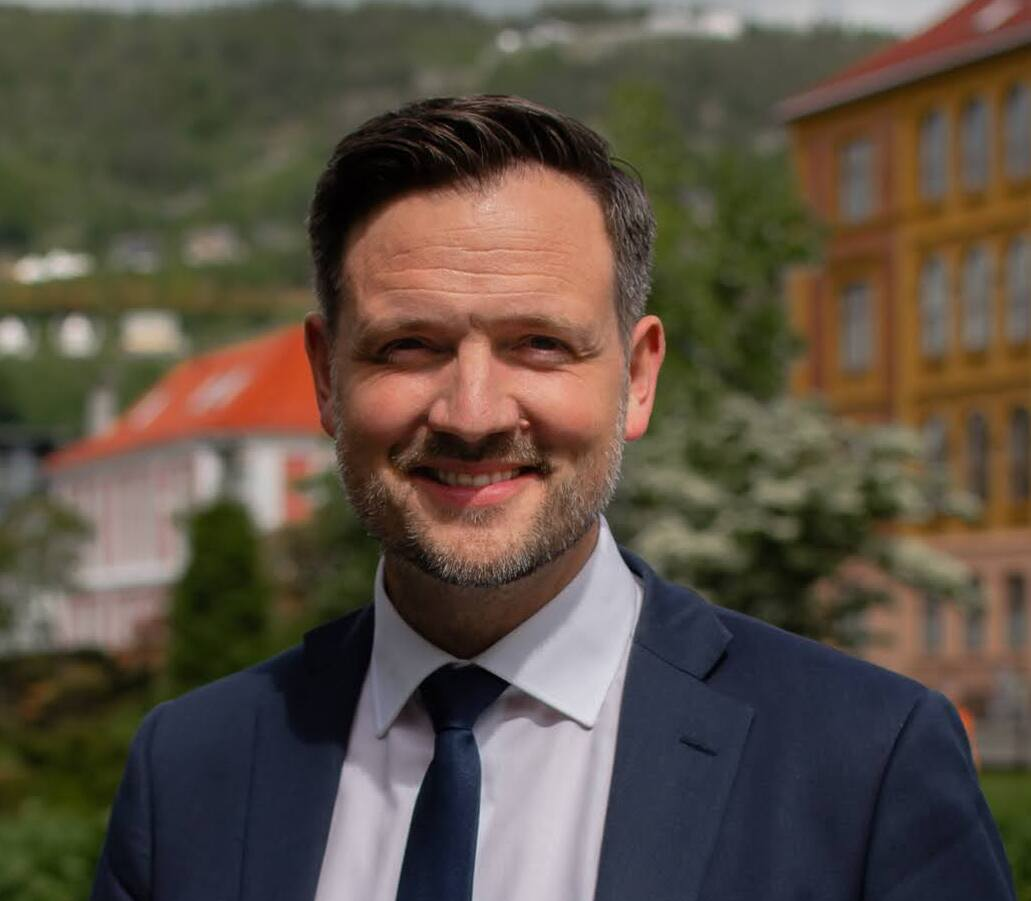

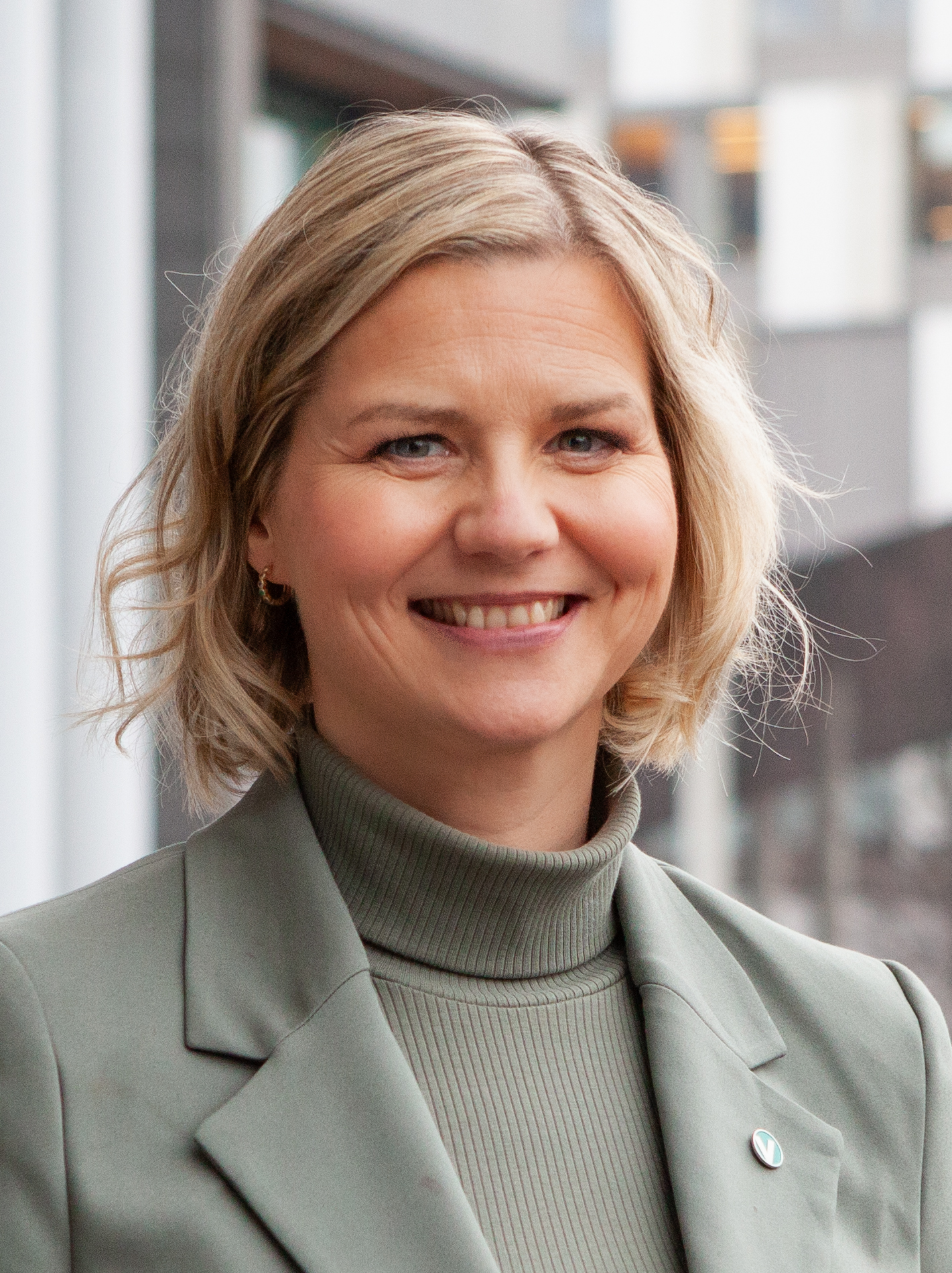
	First party	Second party	Third party
Leader	Jonas Gahr Støre	Sylvi Listhaug	Erna Solberg
Party	Labour	Progress	Conservative
Leader since	14 June 2014	8 May 2021	9 May 2004
Leader's seat	Oslo	Møre og Romsdal	Hordaland
Last election	48 seats, 26.35%	21 seats, 11.61%	36 seats, 20.35%
Seats won	53	47	24
Seat change	▲5	▲26	▼12
Popular vote	902,296	767,903	471,602
Percentage	28.02%	23.85%	14.65%
Swing	▲1.77 pp	▲12.24 pp	▼5.70 pp
	Fourth party	Fifth party	Sixth party
Leader	Kirsti Bergstø	Trygve Slagsvold Vedum	Marie Sneve Martinussen
Party	Socialist Left	Centre	Red
Leader since	18 March 2023	7 April 2014	24 May 2024
Leader's seat	Akershus	Hedmark	Akershus
Last election	13 seats, 7.64%	28 seats, 13.50%	8 seats, 4.72%
Seats won	9	9	9
Seat change	▼4	▼19	▲1
Popular vote	181,192	179,994	171,342
Percentage	5.63%	5.59%	5.32%
Swing	▼2.01 pp	▼7.91 pp	▲0.60 pp
	Seventh party	Eighth party	Ninth party
Leader	Arild Hermstad	Dag-Inge Ulstein	Guri Melby
Party	Green	Christian; Democratic	Liberal
Leader since	26 November 2022	22 August 2024	26 September 2020
Leader's seat	Oslo	Hordaland (stood down)	Oslo
Last election	3 seats, 3.94%	3 seats, 3.80%	8 seats, 4.61%
Seats won	8	7	3
Seat change	▲5	▲4	▼5
Popular vote	152,782	135,230	118,941
Percentage	4.74%	4.20%	3.69%
Swing	▲0.80 pp	▲0.40 pp	▼0.92 pp
Prime Minister before election
Jonas Gahr Støre
Labour
Prime Minister after election
Jonas Gahr Støre
Labour

Parliamentary elections were held in Norway on 8 September 2025 to elect all 169 members of the Storting, the Norwegian parliament, for the 2025–2029 parliamentary term. Advance voting took place from 11 August to 5 September.

The election resulted in incumbent Prime Minister Jonas Gahr Støre's Labour Party winning the most seats. The opposition Conservative Party, led by former Prime Minister Erna Solberg, fell to third place for the first time since 2009. The right-wing populist Progress Party gained seats in the Storting and ended up with 47 seats, the highest seat count in the party's history; this made it the largest opposition party for the term. It also marked the highest voter turn-out since 1989.

The red-green bloc won a majority with 88 seats, allowing Støre to continue as Prime Minister in his minority government. The victory came after years of poor opinion polling, after which the Labour Party made a political comeback. Issues in the election included taxes, immigration, foreign relations, healthcare, and rising inequality.

== Background ==
=== Government formation ===
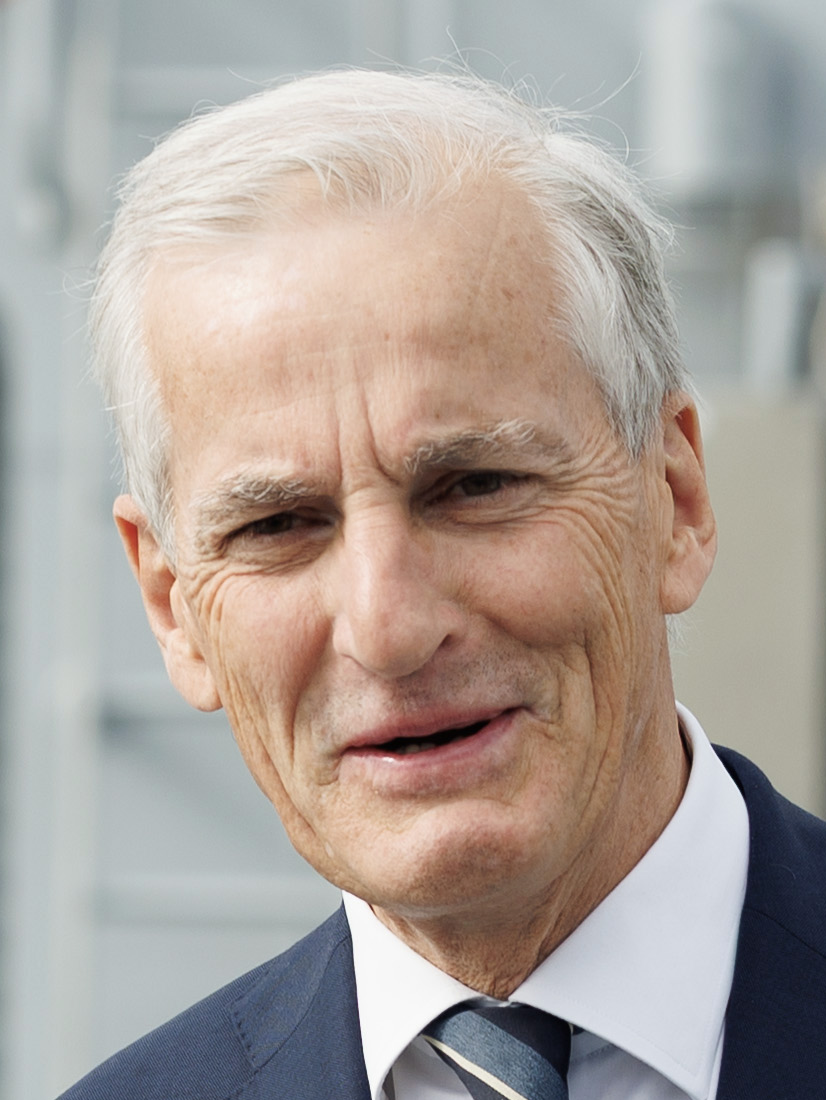
Jonas Gahr Støre became the prime minister of Norway after the 2021 election.

In the 2021 Norwegian parliamentary election, the Labour Party emerged victorious, defeating the Conservative Party of Erna Solberg. After the elections, Jonas Gahr Støre, the leader of the Labour Party, started talks about the formation of a new government with the Centre Party and Socialist Left Party. The Socialist Left Party backed down from negotiations due to disagreements over environmental and welfare policies. The Labour Party and the Centre Party then negotiated on forming a minority government, which was officialised in October 2021. Støre was sworn in as the prime minister of Norway on 14 October 2021. Throughout the existence of his cabinet, however, they relied on support from the Socialist Left Party.

=== Ministerial resignations ===
Since 2021, Støre's government saw changes due to resignations of several ministers. Hadia Tajik, the minister of labour and social inclusion, was the first to resign in March 2022 due to alleged tax fraud from 2006. She was succeeded as minister by Marte Mjøs Persen. A month later, Odd Roger Enoksen resigned as minister of defence after sexual harassment allegations. He was succeeded by Bjørn Arild Gram.

In June 2023, Nettavisen reported that minister Anette Trettebergstuen was involved in a cronyist case by appointing colleagues to the board of Norsk Tipping. Aftenposten also reported that she had also nominated a close colleague to the board of the Oslo Opera House. Trettebergstuen resigned as minister later that month and was succeeded by Lubna Jaffery. A month later, Ola Borten Moe resigned as minister, while Anniken Huitfeldt was dismissed in an October 2023 government reshuffle. In January 2024, the Sandra Borch and Ingvild Kjerkol plagiarism affair occurred, which led to the resignation of ministers Sandra Borch and Ingvild Kjerkol.

=== Collapse of governing coalition ===
In January 2025, the Centre Party left the governing coalition over disagreements with the Labour Party on energy policy relating to the European Union, resulting in the first one-party government in 25 years. Eight cabinet ministers from the Centre Party were replaced, including Centre Party leader and minister of finance Trygve Slagsvold Vedum, who was succeeded by former Prime Minister Jens Stoltenberg.

Stoltenberg's return has been credited with the Labour Party's resurgence in the polls, dubbed the "Jens effect" or the "Stoltenberg effect". Within days of his return, nicknamed the "Stoltenback", the Labour Party had gained 10 points in the polls. The Centre Party's exit from government has also been credited, with journalist Berit Aalborg arguing that it made the Labour Party more recognisable to its former voters.

== Electoral system ==
The election was held using party-list proportional representation in 19 multi-member constituencies based on the pre-2018 counties of Norway. The number of members to be returned from each constituency varies between 4 and 20. To determine the apportionment of the 169 seats amongst the 19 counties, a two-tier formula is used, based on population and geographic size. Each inhabitant counts one point, while each square kilometer counts 1.8 points. Each constituency is guaranteed 4 seats.

150 of the seats (all but one in each constituency) are constituency seats. These are awarded based on the election results in each county, and are unaffected by results in other counties. Nineteen of the seats (one for each county) are levelling seats, awarded to parties above 4% of the national vote. A modification of the Sainte-Lague method, where the first quotient for each party is calculated using a divisor of 1.4 instead of 1, is used to allocate both the constituency and leveling seats. A party must cross the electoral threshold of 4% of the national vote in order to win levelling seats but may still win constituency seats even if it fails to reach this threshold. If a party wins more constituency seats than it is entitled to seats overall based on its national vote share, those additional seats are kept, with the number of seats won by other parties being reduced. The system for apportioning seats to constituencies is biased in favour of rural areas since the area of the county is a factor, but the system of compensation seats reduces the effect this has on the number of seats won by each party.

Seats by constituency
Constituency	Population (as of 1.1.2024)	Area (km^{2}) (as of 1.1.2024)	Seats	Change since 2021
Østfold	312,152	4,004	9	Steady
Akershus	728,803	5,895	20	▲1
Oslo	717,710	454	20	Steady
Hedmark	202,048	27,398	7	Steady
Oppland	174,256	24,675	6	Steady
Buskerud	269,819	14,694	8	Steady
Vestfold	256,432	2,168	7	Steady
Telemark	177,093	15,298	6	Steady
Aust-Agder	122,968	9,155	4	Steady
Vest-Agder	196,882	7,278	6	Steady
Rogaland	499,417	9,377	14	Steady
Hordaland	541,875	15,438	16	Steady
Sogn og Fjordane	109,424	18,433	4	Steady
Møre og Romsdal	270,624	14,356	8	Steady
Sør-Trøndelag	347,516	20,258	10	Steady
Nord-Trøndelag	135,440	21,945	5	Steady
Nordland	243,081	38,155	9	Steady
Troms	169,610	26,189	6	Steady
Finnmark	75,053	48,638	4	▼1

== Political parties ==
The table below lists political parties elected to the Storting in the 2021 parliamentary election.

Name		Ideology	Position	Leader	2021 result	
Name		Ideology	Position	Leader	Votes (%)	Seats
Ap	Labour Party; Arbeiderpartiet	Social democracy	Centre-left	Jonas Gahr Støre	26.3%	48 / 169
H	Conservative Party; Høyre	Liberal conservatism	Centre-right	Erna Solberg	20.4%	36 / 169
Sp	Centre Party; Senterpartiet	Agrarianism	Centre	Trygve Slagsvold Vedum	13.5%	28 / 169
FrP	Progress Party; Fremskrittspartiet	Right-wing populism	Right-wing to far-right	Sylvi Listhaug	11.6%	21 / 169
SV	Socialist Left Party; Sosialistisk Venstreparti	Socialism	Left-wing	Kirsti Bergstø	7.6%	13 / 169
R	Red Party; Rødt	Marxism	Left-wing to far-left	Marie Sneve Martinussen	4.7%	8 / 169
V	Liberal Party; Venstre	Liberalism	Centre	Guri Melby	4.6%	8 / 169
MDG	Green Party; Miljøpartiet De Grønne	Green politics	Centre-left	Arild Hermstad	3.9%	3 / 169
KrF	Christian Democratic Party; Kristelig Folkeparti	Christian democracy	Centre-right	Dag Inge Ulstein	3.8%	3 / 169
PF	Patient Focus; Pasientfokus	Single-issue politics (health politics)	—N/a	Irene Ojala	0.2%	1 / 169
Source: Norwegian Directorate of Elections

The table below shows the extraparliamentary parties contesting the 2025 election.

Name		Ideology	Position	Leader	2021 result
ND	Norway Democrats; Norgesdemokratene	National conservatism	Far-right	Geir Ugland Jacobsen	1.1% (as Democrats in Norway)
PP	Pensioners' Party; Pensjonistpartiet	Single-issue politics (pensioners' interests)	—N/a	Kurt Johhny Hæggernes	0.6%
K	Conservative; Konservativt	Christian right Russophilia	Far-right	Erik Selle	0.4% (as The Christians)
INP	Industry and Business Party; Industri- og Næringspartiet	Populism	Right-wing	Ann Jorun Hillersøy	0.3%
S	Partiet Sentrum	Centrism	Centre to centre-left	Geir Lippestad	0.3%
VIP	Welfare and Innovation Party; Velferd og Innovasjonspartiet	Single-issue politics (health policy)		Erik Hexeberg	0.2% (as Health Party)
NKP	Communist Party of Norway; Norges Kommunistiske Parti	Communism	Far-left	Runa Evensen	0.0%
GP	Generation Party; Generasjonspartiet	Direct democracy		Gyda Oddekalv	0.0%
DNI	DNI Party; Partiet DNI	Climate scepticism		Owe I. Waltherzøe	New party
FOR	Peace and Justice; Fred og Rettferdighet	Russophilia		Marielle Leraand	New party
ENS	Loneliness Party; Ensomhetspartiet	Single-issue politics (suicide prevention)		Else Kåss Furuseth	New party
RUS	Save Ullevål Hospital; Redd Ullevål sykehus	Single-issue politics (health politics)	—N/a	Lene Sundfær Haug	Did not contest
Source: Norwegian Directorate of Elections

Of the parties listed above, four only each contested a single constituency: Patient Focus in Finnmark, the Communist Party in Vest-Agder, and both the Loneliness Party and Save Ullevål Hospital in Oslo.

== Campaign ==
The incumbent government consists of the Labour Party (Ap) of Prime Minister Jonas Gahr Støre, which has governed the country as a minority government since the previous election in 2021, first in coalition with the Centre Party (Sp) from 2021 until January 2025, and subsequently as a single-party government. Støre ran for re-election in 2025, and was supported by a bloc made up of the five so-called red-green parties, which aside from the Labour and Centre parties also include the Socialist Left (SV), Red (R), and Green (MDG) parties. Together, these five parties obtained 100 of the Storting's 169 seats at the previous election. The red-green bloc was challenged in the 2025 election by four centrist-to-right-wing parties, namely former prime minister Erna Solberg's Conservative Party (H), the Progress Party (FrP), the Liberal Party (V), and the Christian Democratic Party (KrF). Both Solberg and FrP leader Sylvi Listhaug were discussed as possible contenders for the premiership in the event of an election victory for the right-wing bloc. Leftist parties promised to end funding for Israeli companies by the Norwegian sovereign wealth fund due to the Gaza war.

=== Slogans ===
Party	Original slogan	English translation
Labour Party	Trygghet for fremtida	Safety for the future
Conservative Party	Ingen slagord. Bare løsninger.	No slogans. Only solutions.
Centre Party	Hele Norge	All of Norway
Progress Party	For folk flest	For most people
Socialist Left Party	For de mange – ikke for de få	For the many – not for the few
Red Party	Fordi fellesskap fungerer	Because community works
Liberal Party	Tenk nytt for Norge	Think new for Norway
Green Party	Det ER mulig	It IS possible
Christian Democratic Party	Bygge på verdier – skape verdier	Building on values – creating values

=== Debates ===
2025 Norwegian general election debates
Date	Time	Organisers	P Present S Surrogate N Non-invitee									
Date	Time	Organisers	Ap	H	Sp	FrP	SV	R	V	MDG	KrF	Refs
18 December 2024	14:40	NRK	P Jonas Gahr Støre	N	N	P Sylvi Listhaug	N	N	N	N	N	
14 January 2025	21:15	NRK	P Jonas Gahr Støre	N	N	P Sylvi Listhaug	N	N	N	N	N	
30 January 2025	21:15	NRK	P Jonas Gahr Støre	P Erna Solberg	P Trygve Slagsvold Vedum	P Sylvi Listhaug	P Kirsti Bergstø	P Marie Sneve Martinussen	S Sveinung Rotevatn	S Ingrid Liland	P Dag-Inge Ulstein	
6 February 2025	21:15	NRK	P Jonas Gahr Støre	P Erna Solberg	N	P Sylvi Listhaug	N	S Sofie Marhaug	N	N	N	
30 July 2025	19:30	Ap and FrP	P Jonas Gahr Støre	N	N	P Sylvi Listhaug	N	N	N	N	N	
11 August 2025	21:15	NRK	P Jonas Gahr Støre	P Erna Solberg	P Trygve Slagsvold Vedum	P Sylvi Listhaug	P Kirsti Bergstø	P Marie Sneve Martinussen	P Guri Melby	P Arild Hermstad	P Dag-Inge Ulstein	
27 August 2025	21:15	NRK	P Jonas Gahr Støre	P Erna Solberg	N	P Sylvi Listhaug	N	N	N	N	N	
2 September 2025	20:00	NRK	P Jonas Gahr Støre	P Erna Solberg	P Trygve Slagsvold Vedum	P Sylvi Listhaug	P Kirsti Bergstø	P Marie Sneve Martinussen	P Guri Melby	P Arild Hermstad	P Dag-Inge Ulstein	
5 September 2025	19:30	Aftenbladet	P Jonas Gahr Støre	N	N	P Sylvi Listhaug	N	N	N	N	N	

== Opinion polls ==
Local regression trend line of poll results from 13 September 2021 to the present day. Each line corresponds to a political party.

== Results ==
The Labour Party, led by Jonas Gahr Støre, won 53 seats with 28.0% of the vote, securing a lead for the red-green bloc. In the opposition, the centre-right Conservative Party, led by Erna Solberg, received 14.6% of votes, marking the party's worst election result since 2005. The right-wing populist Progress Party became the largest opposition party, with Sylvi Listhaug as its leader, receiving 23.8% of votes.

Party	Votes	%	Seats	+/–
Labour Party	902,296	28.02	53	+5
Progress Party	767,903	23.85	47	+26
Conservative Party	471,602	14.65	24	–12
Socialist Left Party	181,192	5.63	9	–4
Centre Party	179,994	5.59	9	–19
Red Party	171,342	5.32	9	+1
Green Party	152,782	4.74	8	+5
Christian Democratic Party	135,230	4.20	7	+4
Liberal Party	118,941	3.69	3	–5
Pensioners' Party	26,839	0.83	0	0
Norway Democrats	23,260	0.72	0	0
Generation Party	21,589	0.67	0	0
Industry and Business Party	18,771	0.58	0	0
Konservativt	15,507	0.48	0	0
Peace and Justice	9,430	0.29	0	New
Partiet Sentrum	5,701	0.18	0	0
DNI Party	5,280	0.16	0	New
Welfare and Innovation Party	4,932	0.15	0	0
Patient Focus	4,174	0.13	0	–1
Save Ullevål Hospital	2,361	0.07	0	New
Loneliness Party	712	0.02	0	New
Communist Party of Norway	50	0.00	0	0
Total	3,219,888	100.00	169	0
Valid votes	3,219,888	99.02		
Invalid votes	5,510	0.17		
Blank votes	26,430	0.81		
Total votes	3,251,828	100.00		
Registered voters/turnout	4,059,218	80.11		
Source: valgresultat.no

=== Voter demographics ===
Cohort	Percentage of cohort voting for									
Cohort	Ap	FrP	H	SV	Sp	R	MDG	KrF	V	Others
Total vote	28.02%	23.85%	14.65%	5.63%	5.59%	5.32%	4.74%	4.20%	3.69%	4.28%
Gender
Women	32%	17%	13%	8%	6%	7%	6%	5%	4%	4%
Men	24%	31%	16%	4%	5%	4%	4%	4%	4%	4%
Age
18–21 years old	20%	30%	16%	11%	5%	4%	6%	4%	4%	1%
22-29 years old	20%	30%	10%	12%	3%	7%	8%	3%	4%	3%
30-39 years old	19%	24%	8%	10%	5%	8%	9%	5%	5%	5%
40-49 years old	26%	20%	14%	5%	6%	6%	6%	5%	4%	6%
50-59 years old	28%	25%	19%	2%	6%	4%	4%	4%	4%	4%
60-69 years old	34%	22%	16%	3%	6%	4%	3%	3%	3%	5%
Age by gender
Men 18–34 y/o	17%	38%	12%	7%	2%	6%	6%	4%	5%	3%
Men 39-49 y/o	22%	28%	14%	4%	6%	6%	6%	4%	5%	7%
Men 50-69 y/o	26%	29%	20%	2%	6%	3%	3%	3%	4%	4%
Men 70+ y/o	32%	26%	18%	2%	6%	4%	2%	4%	2%	3%
Women 18–34 y/o	22%	17%	10%	16%	6%	8%	10%	4%	5%	3%
Women 39-49 y/o	27%	15%	12%	8%	7%	9%	7%	6%	4%	5%
Women 50-69 y/o	37%	18%	15%	4%	6%	6%	4%	4%	3%	5%
Women 70+ y/o	40%	16%	16%	4%	5%	4%	2%	6%	2%	4%
Education
Primary school	26%	35%	11%	4%	5%	6%	2%	4%	3%	5%
High school	26%	31%	14%	3%	7%	4%	2%	4%	2%	5%
University (≤4 years)	31%	14%	16%	8%	5%	6%	6%	5%	5%	4%
University (≥5 years)	30%	8%	17%	9%	3%	6%	13%	4%	8%	2%
Source: Norwegian Institute for Social Research

=== Results by constituency ===
The following shows the vote share and seat count for each party and each bloc in the constituencies. The dagger symbol (†) next to one of the party seat counts in a constituency, indicates that one of the seats earned by the party was a levelling seat.

Constituency	Parties																				Blocs			
Constituency	Ap		Frp		H		SV		Sp		R		MDG		KrF		V		Others		Red		Blue	
Constituency	%	S	%	S	%	S	%	S	%	S	%	S	%	S	%	S	%	S	%	S	%	S	%	S
Østfold	29.8	4	28.7	3	12.5	1	4.3	0	4.8	0	5.2	1†	3.4	0	3.9	0	2.5	0	4.9	0	47.6	5	47.6	4
Akershus	27.3	6	23.6	5	19.4	4	5.2	1	2.9	0	4.2	1	5.4	1	2.6	1†	5.4	1	4.0	0	45.1	9	51.0	11
Oslo	25.7	5	14.3	3	18.5	4	10.7	2	0.8	0	7.2	2†	10.3	2	2.1	0	7.3	2	3.1	0	54.5	11	42.2	9
Hedmark	35.0	3	21.1	2	9.0	1†	4.5	0	13.6	1	4.8	0	2.8	0	2.2	0	1.9	0	5.1	0	60.7	4	34.2	3
Oppland	33.2	2	21.4	2	9.2	0	4.5	1†	15.8	1	4.5	0	2.9	0	2.2	0	2.2	0	4.1	0	60.9	4	35.0	2
Buskerud	29.4	3	27.6	3	15.3	1	4.4	1†	5.5	0	4.0	0	3.6	0	2.8	0	3.1	0	4.3	0	46.9	4	48.8	4
Vestfold	27.5	2	27.6	3	16.5	1	4.1	0	3.3	0	4.9	0	4.3	1†	4.1	0	3.5	0	4.2	0	44.1	3	51.7	4
Telemark	31.3	2	26.1	2	11.0	1	4.1	0	6.2	0	5.9	0	3.3	0	5.0	1†	2.1	0	5.0	0	50.8	2	44.2	4
Aust-Agder	26.9	1	27.8	1	13.0	1	3.9	0	5.1	0	4.6	0	3.4	0	8.1	1†	2.6	0	4.6	0	43.8	1	51.5	3
Vest-Agder	22.8	1	27.7	2	13.5	1	3.9	1†	4.0	0	4.0	0	3.5	0	13.0	1	3.1	0	4.5	0	38.3	2	57.3	4
Rogaland	23.7	4	28.7	4	15.3	2	3.7	1†	5.0	1	5.5	1	2.7	0	8.4	1	2.6	0	4.4	0	40.6	7	55.1	7
Hordaland	26.7	4	23.8	4	16.9	3	5.8	1	4.2	1†	5.0	1	4.9	1	5.0	1	3.4	0	4.3	0	46.6	8	49.1	8
Sogn og Fjordane	30.9	1	20.8	1	10.2	0	4.3	0	16.0	1	4.0	0	3.3	1†	4.3	0	2.9	0	3.3	0	58.5	3	38.2	1
Møre og Romsdal	23.6	2	32.3	3	12.6	1	3.8	0	7.3	1	3.5	0	3.1	0	6.8	1†	3.0	0	4.0	0	41.3	3	54.7	5
Sør-Trøndelag	32.0	4	19.8	2	12.5	1	6.9	1	6.8	1	6.0	1†	5.8	0	2.5	0	3.7	0	4.0	0	57.3	7	38.4	3
Nord-Trøndelag	36.3	2	19.5	1	9.0	0	4.2	0	14.8	1	5.2	0	2.4	1†	2.6	0	1.8	0	4.2	0	62.9	4	32.9	1
Nordland	30.6	3	25.6	3	11.2	1	5.7	0	8.6	1	6.6	1†	2.9	0	2.4	0	2.0	0	4.4	0	54.4	5	41.1	4
Troms	29.5	2	25.8	2	10.9	1	7.2	0	6.3	0	7.4	1†	3.6	0	2.9	0	2.0	0	4.4	0	54.1	3	41.6	3
Finnmark	28.1	2	24.5	1	5.9	0	5.2	0	5.5	0	9.8	0	2.2	1†	2.1	0	1.2	0	15.5	0	50.8	3	33.7	1
Total	28.0	53	23.8	47	14.6	24	5.6	9	5.6	9	5.3	9	4.7	8	4.2	7	3.7	3	4.5	0	49.3	88	46.4	81
Source: Directorate of Elections

Percentage of Labour Party votes

Percentage of Progress Party votes

Percentage of Conservative Party votes

Percentage of Socialist Left Party votes

Percentage of Centre Party votes

Percentage of Red Party votes

Percentage of Green Party votes

Percentage of Christian Democratic Party votes

Percentage of Liberal Party votes

== Aftermath ==
=== Labour Party ===
After the election, Prime Minister and Labour Party leader Jonas Gahr Støre described the outcome as "a difficult but successful victory". He noted that although right-wing parties have been rising across Europe, the result showed that social democratic forces still retain persuasive power and can secure majority public support amid challenges. Støre reiterated the Labour Party's core policy commitments, particularly maintaining the wealth tax system, while also indicating that future tax reform should be explored through cross-party cooperation and dedicated committees to build broader consensus. In addition, he stressed that Norway must maintain a balanced energy policy, continuing to serve as a reliable energy supplier for Europe while also meeting environmental and emission-reduction responsibilities.

Støre acknowledged that the Labour Party will continue to form a minority government, with its stability dependent on support from smaller left-wing parties. However, he prefers to avoid overly rigid formal agreements in order to maintain flexibility in decision-making. In addition, former Prime Minister Jens Stoltenberg stated that the election result gave him "the motivation to continue serving as Minister of Finance".

Støre conducted a minor cabinet reshuffle on 16 September, where deputy leader Tonje Brenna was replaced by former party secretary Kjersti Stenseng as minister of labour and social inclusion and Stenseng was in turn replaced by former deputy leader Bjørnar Skjæran as minister of local government. Brenna became the party's parliamentary leader, a move described as her getting more parliamentary experience.

=== Progress Party ===
After the election, Progress Party leader Sylvi Listhaug emphasised that this was the most successful election in the party's history, describing the result as "extraordinary". Although the right-wing bloc did not regain power, she positioned the Progress Party as the core leading force of the opposition, pledging to serve as the main policy alternative. Listhaug also warned about the political direction of the next four years, arguing that under Labour leadership Norway would face a clear shift to the left, potentially creating difficulties for both citizens and businesses. In addition, she stated that the party's future strategy will focus on achieving a breakthrough in the 2027 local elections, with the ultimate goal of competing for government power in the 2029 parliamentary election, signaling a long-term ambition to govern.

=== Conservative Party ===
After the election results were announced, Conservative Party leader Erna Solberg admitted that the outcome was a setback for the party, stating bluntly: "The result should have been better, but we did not achieve it." Although Solberg did not immediately resign, she admitted that the party needed to review its campaign strategy, communication methods, and policy promotion in order to respond to voter concerns about the Conservatives' role. She stated that her resignation "will come at some point". Subsequently, several senior figures within the party expressed that they wanted a new leader. On 12 September, Solberg announced that she would step down as party leader, stating that she would remain in charge until the next national congress.

=== Socialist Left Party ===
Socialist Left Party leader Kirsti Bergstø stated after the election that the party had become Norway's fourth largest party and the second largest force within the red-green bloc. She emphasised that the result prevented a right-wing government led by Listhaug and the Progress Party, and called on the red-green parties to take collective responsibility by placing "the needs of ordinary people" at the core of politics. Bergstø also met with Prime Minister Støre after the election, during which the two held a constructive dialogue about possible directions for future red-green cooperation. She expressed gratitude to voters and volunteers, and reiterated that the Socialist Left Party would actively promote reducing inequality, a fair climate transition, and a dignified Norwegian foreign policy.

=== Centre Party ===
Centre Party leader Trygve Slagsvold Vedum made it clear after the election that he would not resign despite the party's reduced number of seats, stressing that he would continue to lead the party. Although the Centre Party emerged smaller in parliament, Vedum argued that it still held pivotal votes and could play the role of a "decisive minority" in the legislature. Vedum stated that "we must make good use of the power we now have", demonstrating his determination to push forward policies related to rural areas, energy, and sovereignty. After the election, he also met with Prime Minister Støre for talks on future cooperation.

=== Red Party ===
Red Party leader Marie Sneve Martinussen stressed after the election that the party's results symbolized "our continued writing of history". She noted that since entering parliament for the first time in the 2017 Norwegian parliamentary election and surpassing the threshold in 2021, the party has steadily grown and has now become "an important force for change rather than a fleeting phenomenon". Martinussen also made clear that the Red Party was willing to cooperate with other left-wing parties, directly naming the Labour Party, Socialist Left Party, Centre Party, and Green Party. She underlined the need to work together to reduce inequality, strengthen welfare, and safeguard democracy. In addition, she specifically called for Norway to "do more for Palestine".

Martinussen criticised the right-wing campaign led by Progress Party leader Listhaug, declaring that the Red Party would work actively to counter that agenda. She emphasised that the party would not stand passively by but would take part in negotiations, combining principle with pragmatism to push for real social reforms. She urged more people to join the Red Party and social movements, stressing that "the election is only the beginning of a new phase".

=== Green Party ===
After the election, Green Party leader Arild Hermstad described the outcome as a "historic victory for the Green Party", successfully surpassing the threshold and winning seven seats in parliament, marking the best result in the party's history. He emphasized that the Greens would wield greater influence in the new parliament, prioritizing climate policy, social justice, and the issue of Palestine.

Hermstad stated that the Green Party is calling for a gradual phaseout of the oil industry, to be completed no later than 2040, alongside an immediate halt to new oil and gas exploration. He pointed out that the Statfjord, Brage, and Draugen oil fields should be prioritized for closure. While the Greens are willing to play a key supporting role in a left-wing government, he stressed that their core principles will not be compromised. Hermstad also highlighted that the party’s strong performance in urban areas such as Oslo demonstrates its growing influence among city voters.

=== Liberal Party ===
The Liberal Party failed to clear the 4% threshold for levelling seats, being reduced to just three MPs. Guri Melby and deputy leader Abid Raja blamed the result on Listhaug's candidacy for Prime Minister and her behavior during the campaign. Melby noted that although the party faced "headwinds and resistance" during the campaign, it nevertheless presented strong policy positions, particularly on issues such as climate action, support for Ukraine, and drug policy reform, where the Liberal Party would not back down.

=== International reactions ===
- Estonia: Prime Minister Kristen Michal congratulated Støre on his re-election.
- Spain: Prime Minister Pedro Sánchez congratulated Støre on his re-election.
- Ukraine: President Volodymyr Zelenskyy congratulated Støre on his re-election.

==== Organisations ====
- European Union: President of the European Commission Ursula von der Leyen congratulated Støre on his re-election.

== See also ==
- 2025 Norwegian Sámi parliamentary election
