= Global Electoral Organization Conference =

The Global Electoral Organization Conference (GEO Conference) is an invitation-only conference which aims to "bring together electoral practitioners and experts to exchange knowledge and share experiences, to provide a forum for networking, to present opportunities for provoking debate and promoting initiatives."

== Collaborating organizations ==
- ACE Electoral Knowledge Network
- International IDEA
- Southern African Development Community
- Electoral Institute for the Sustainability of Democracy in Africa
- Federal Electoral Institute
- Elections Canada
- IFES
- United Nations Electoral Assistance Division

== Past GEO Conferences ==
In 1999, the first GEO conference was held in Ottawa, Ontario, Canada. The second GEO Conference was not held until 2003 in Mexico. The third GEO Conference was held in Hungary. GEO2007, the fourth conference, was held in Washington, D.C. Four year later, GEO2011 was held in Gaborone, Botswana.
