= Eisa =

Eisa or EISA may refer to:

== Computing ==
- Extended Industry Standard Architecture, a bus standard for computer add-on cards
- EISA partition, an OEM disk partition type
- Enterprise information security architecture

== Organisations ==
- Electoral Institute of Southern Africa, former name of the Electoral Institute for Sustainable Democracy in Africa
- Expert Imaging and Sound Association (EISA Awards)
- European Initiative for Sustainable Development in Agriculture, an association of national and European agricultural associations and organisations

== Other uses ==
- Eisa, a daughter of the jötunn Logi in Norse mythology
- Eisa (dance), a form of folk dance in Okinawa
- Energy Independence and Security Act of 2007 (EISA 2007)
- Hossam Eisa, Egyptian politician and academic
- Medina Eisa, Ethiopian long-distance runner
