= Culshaw =

Culshaw is a surname. Notable people with the surname include:

- John Culshaw (1924–1980), English classical record producer
- Jon Culshaw (born 1968), English impressionist and comedian
- Mitchell Culshaw (born 2001), English footballer
- Peter Culshaw (born 1973), English boxer

== See also ==
- Cutshaw
