= Anthony Banbury =

American politician

President of the International Foundation for Electoral Systems
- Incumbent
- Assumed office 2018
- Preceded by: Bill Sweeney

Personal details
- Born: 1964 (age 61–62)
- Education: Tufts University (BA, MS); Geneva Graduate Institute (GradD)

Anthony Banbury (born 1964) was appointed the President and Chief Executive Officer of the International Foundation for Electoral Systems (IFES) in 2018. He served as United Nations Assistant Secretary-General for Field Support until 5 February 2016. He retired from this position, afterwards stating that the UN is in dire need of reform. Drawing on more than 20 years of experience with the UN, he criticized its sclerotic personnel system, a lack of accountability, insufficient impact and the UN's inability to deal with transgressions by its own staff.

From June 2009 until he retired, Banbury served as United Nations Assistant Secretary-General for Field Support. He was appointed to this position by UN Secretary-General Ban Ki-moon. In this position he was responsible for overseeing operational support to the more than 30 UN peacekeeping and political missions around the world, with a combined budget in excess of $8 billion.

While serving as Assistant Secretary-General at UN headquarters in New York, Banbury was on four occasions given special assignments by the Secretary-General.

From 23 September 2014 to 3 January 2015, Banbury served as the Special Representative of the Secretary-General and Head of the United Nations Mission for Emergency Ebola Response. Appointed to this position near the peak of the Ebola crisis, Banbury designed the UN system-wide operational response and led its implementation; by the time he left the Ebola caseload had reduced significantly and the crisis phase was largely over. He was replaced by Ismail Ould Cheikh Ahmed following the end of his tour of duty at UNMEER on January 3, 2015.

In January 2014 the Secretary-General appointed Banbury as the UN Central African Republic Crisis Manager at a time of widespread violence, population displacement and risk of genocide. Banbury developed a six-point plan for the Secretary-General that was approved by the UN Security Council and contributed to the abatement of the crisis.

In September 2013 the Secretary-General assigned Banbury to negotiate with the Organization for the Prohibition of Chemical Weapons (OPCW) on the establishment of an international mission to remove and destroy Syria's declared chemical weapons stocks and production facilities, following an agreement between U.S. Secretary of State John Kerry and Russian Foreign Minister Sergei Lavrov. Banbury led the negotiations, design and initial capability deployment from the UN side. The joint OPCW-UN mission successfully removed and/or destroyed all declared chemical weapons stocks and production facilities.

In January 2010 the Secretary-General named Banbury as his acting Principal Deputy Special Representative in Haiti just days after the devastating earthquake of 12 January. From that position Banbury designed and led the UN system's operational response to the most deadly natural disaster in the western hemisphere in modern history, working closely with the Haitian government, the U.S. military's Operation Unified Response, and non-governmental organizations to save lives, bring aid to the Haitian people and rebuild MINUSTAH, the UN's peacekeeping mission.

Banbury studied political science at Tufts University and obtained his master's degree from The Fletcher School of Law and Diplomacy. He also received a Diploma of Higher Studies from the Graduate Institute of International Studies in Geneva.

He held various positions in the United Nations in his early career. From 1988 to 1995, he served in the United Nations Border Relief Operation in Thailand, the United Nations Transitional Authority in Cambodia and the United Nations Protection Force in Bosnia-Herzegovina and Croatia. Between 1996 and 1997, he worked in the Secretariat, at the Executive Office of the Secretary-General and in the Department of Humanitarian Affairs.

Banbury also served as the Asia Regional Director for the World Food Programme in Bangkok from 2003 to 2009, where he managed humanitarian relief and development operations in 14 countries. He also was an integral part of the relief operations for the 2004 tsunami and the 2008 Cyclone Nargis.

Besides his working experience at the United Nations, Banbury also worked for the United States Government, from 1997 to 1999 as an advisor on the Balkans in the Office of the Secretary of Defense, and from 2000 to 2003 at the National Security Council in the White House in the Clinton and G. W. Bush administrations. He received the Distinguished Service Award from the President of the United States for his service on 9/11, and the Exceptional Civilian Service Award with Bronze Palm from the Secretary of Defense. He is married with four children.
