= Wallis Foundation =

The Wallis Foundation is a foundation established by Hollywood producer Hal Wallis. The foundation funded CSU presidential Scholarships in 1999 and has provided donations to the International Foundation for Electoral Systems. The foundation was established in 1959 and as of 2004 had over 44 million dollars in assets.
