= Election commission =

Body which oversees elections

An election commission is a body charged with overseeing the implementation of electioneering process of any country. The formal names of election commissions vary from jurisdiction to jurisdiction, and may be styled an electoral commission, a central or state election commission, or an election board, an electoral council or an electoral court. Election commissions can be independent, mixed, judicial or executive. They may also be responsible for electoral boundary delimitation. In federations there may be a separate body for each subnational government. An election commission has a duty to ensure elections are conducted in an orderly manner.

== Electoral models ==
=== Independent model ===
In the independent model, the election commission is independent of the executive and manages its own budget. Countries with an independent election commission include Australia, Bangladesh, Canada, India, Jordan, Nigeria, Pakistan, Poland, Romania, South Africa, South Korea, Sri Lanka, Thailand, and the United Kingdom. In some of these countries, the independence of the election commission is constitutionally guaranteed, for example, section 190 of the Constitution of South Africa.

=== Branch model ===
In the branch model, the election commission is often called an electoral branch, and is usually a constitutionally recognized separate branch of government, with its members appointed by either the executive or the legislative branch. Countries with an electoral branch include Bolivia, Costa Rica, Panama, Nicaragua, and Venezuela.

=== Mixed model ===
In the mixed-model there is an independent board to determine policy, but implementation is usually a matter for an executive department with varying degrees of supervision by the independent board. Countries with such a model include Cameroon, France, Germany, Japan, Senegal and Spain.

=== Executive model ===
In the executive model the election commission is directed by a cabinet minister as part of the executive branch of government, and may include local government authorities acting as agents of the central body. Countries with this model include Denmark, Singapore, Sweden, Switzerland, Tunisia.

In the United States, elections for federal, state, and local offices are run by the executive branch of each state government.

=== Judicial model ===
In the judicial model the election commission is closely supervised by and ultimately responsible to a special "electoral court". Countries with such a model include Argentina, Brazil and Mexico.

== List of election commissions ==
- Afghanistan
  - Independent Election Commission (defunct since 2021)
  - Election Complaints Commission (defunct since 2021)
- Albania: Central Election Commission
- Argentina
  - Dirección Nacional Electoral
  - Cámara Nacional Electoral
- Australia: Australian Electoral Commission
  - Australian Capital Territory: Electoral Commission
  - New South Wales: Electoral Commission
  - Northern Territory: Electoral Commission
  - Queensland: Electoral Commission
  - South Australia: Electoral Commission
  - Tasmania: Electoral Commission
  - Victoria: Electoral Commission
  - Western Australia: Electoral Commission
- Bangladesh: Election Commission
- Barbados: Electoral and Boundaries Commission
- Belarus: Central Election Commission
- Belize: Elections and Boundaries Commission
- Bolivia
  - Plurinational Electoral Organ (since 2010)
  - National Electoral Court (defunct since 2010)
- Botswana: Independent Electoral Commission
- Belgium: Federal Public Service Interior
- Brazil: Superior Electoral Court
  - Regional Electoral Courts
- Cambodia: National Election Committee
- Canada: Elections Canada
  - Élections Québec
  - Elections Alberta
  - Elections BC
  - Elections Manitoba
  - Elections New Brunswick
  - Elections Newfoundland & Labrador
  - Elections Nova Scotia
  - Elections Nunavut
  - Elections NWT
  - Elections Ontario
  - Elections Prince Edward Island
  - Elections Saskatchewan
  - Elections Yukon
- Chile: Electoral Service
- China (excl. Hong Kong and Macau): Election Committees for Local People's Congress elections only
- Colombia: National Electoral Council
- Costa Rica: Supreme Electoral Court
- Cuba: National Election Council
- Cyprus: Central Elections Office
- Democratic Republic of the Congo: Independent National Electoral Commission
- Ecuador
  - National Electoral Council
  - Electoral Contentious Tribunal
- Egypt: High Elections Committee
- Ethiopia: National Election Board
- Fiji: Electoral Commission
- France: Constitutional Council
- Georgia: Election Administration of Georgia
- Germany: Federal Returning Officer
- Ghana: Electoral Commission
- Grenada: Parliamentary Elections Office
- Guyana: Elections Commission
- Haiti: Provisional Electoral Council
- Honduras: National Electoral Council
- Hong Kong: Electoral Affairs Commission
- Iceland: National Electoral Commission
- India
  - Election Commission (national)
  - State Election Commissions (responsible for elections to local governments)
- Indonesia: General Elections Commission
- Iran: Guardian Council
- Iraq: Independent High Electoral Commission
- Ireland: Electoral Commission
- Israel: Central Elections Committee
- Italy: Central Directorate for Electoral Services
- Jamaica: Electoral Commission of Jamaica
- Japan: Central Election Management Council
- Jordan: Independent Election Commission
- Kazakhstan: Central Election Commission
- Kenya
  - Interim Independent Electoral Commission (since 2008)
  - Electoral Commission (defunct since 2008)
- Kosovo: Central Election Commission (Kosovo)
- Laos: National Election Committee (Lao)
- Liberia: National Elections Commission
- Libya: High National Election Commission
- Macau: Electoral Affairs Commission (Macau)
- Malaysia: Election Commission
- Malta: Electoral Commission
- Mexico
  - National Electoral Institute
  - Federal Electoral Tribunal
- Moldova: Central Election Commission
- Myanmar: Union Electoral Commission
- Nepal: Election Commission
- Netherlands: Electoral Council
- New Zealand: Electoral Commission
- Nicaragua: Supreme Electoral Council
- Nigeria: Independent National Electoral Commission
- North Korea: Central Election Committee (North Korea)
- Northern Cyprus: High Electoral Board
- Norway: Norwegian Directorate of Elections
- Pakistan: Election Commission
- Palestine: Central Elections Commission
- Philippines: Commission on Elections
  - Once a winner is proclaimed, only these tribunals can rule on election matters
    - Philippines: Presidential Electoral Tribunal (entirely composed of the Supreme Court)
    - Senate Electoral Tribunal
    - House of Representatives Electoral Tribunal
    - Regional Trial Courts for local officials
- Poland: National Electoral Commission
- Portugal: National Elections Commission (Portugal)
- Puntland: Puntland Electoral Commission
- Romania: Permanent Electoral Authority
- Russia: Central Election Commission
- Singapore: Elections Department
- Slovenia: State Election Commission (Državna volilna komisija)
- Somaliland: National Electoral Commission
- South Africa: Electoral Commission of South Africa
- South Korea: National Election Commission
- Spain: Junta Electoral Central
- Sri Lanka: Election Commission of Sri Lanka
- Sweden: Election Authority
- Taiwan: Central Election Commission
- Tanzania: National Electoral Commission
- Thailand: Election Commission
- Tunisia: Independent High Authority for Elections
- Turkey: Supreme Electoral Council of Turkey
- Ukraine: Central Election Commission
- United Kingdom: Electoral Commission
- United States
  - Election Assistance Commission, serves as a national clearinghouse and resource regarding election administration, establishes best practices, and provides financial aid to state electoral systems.
  - Federal Election Commission, regulates campaign finance legislation
  - Electoral Commission, a special commission for the 1876 presidential election
  - Florida: Florida Election Commission
  - Hawaii: Hawaii Elections Commission
  - Illinois: Illinois State Board of Elections
  - Maryland: Maryland State Board of Elections
  - New York: New York State Board of Elections
  - North Carolina: North Carolina State Board of Elections & Ethics Enforcement
  - Oklahoma: Oklahoma State Election Board
  - Puerto Rico: State Elections Commission
  - South Carolina: South Carolina State Election Commission
  - Virginia: Virginia State Board of Elections
  - Wisconsin: Wisconsin Elections Commission
- Uruguay: Electoral Court
- Venezuela: National Electoral Council
- Vietnam: National Election Council (Vietnam)
- Zimbabwe: Electoral Commission

== Election commissions in Africa ==
As of 2021, 53 out of 55 African nations (save for Eritrea and Somalia, which do not hold elections) use or have used election commissions to organize and supervise their elections. First introduced in the Sudan in 1957, election commissions were created across the continent especially after many African nations introduced a system of multi-party democracy in the early 1990s.

== See also ==
- Electoral college, a body which elects a candidate to a particular office.
- Association of Central and Eastern European Election Officials
- Association of African Election Authorities
- Court of Disputed Returns
