= Generation Party =

Norwegian political party advocating Direct democracy

Generation Party Generasjonspartiet
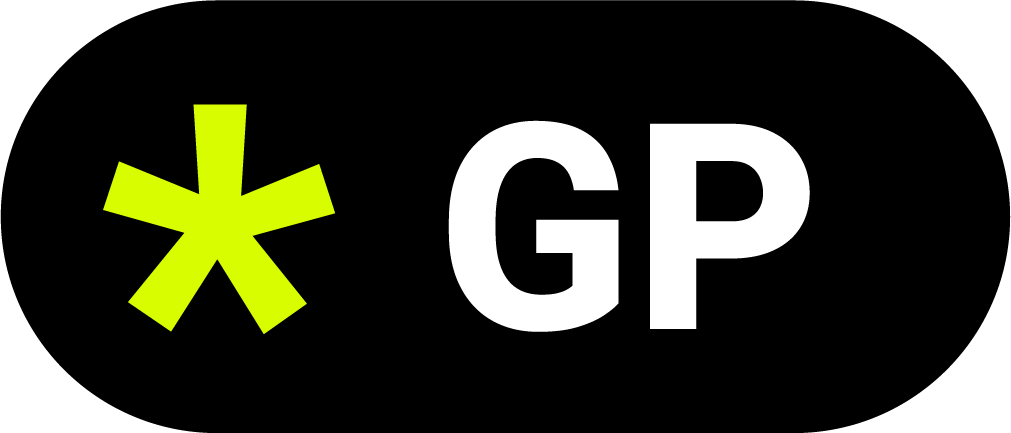
- Abbreviation: GP
- Leader: Gyda Oddekalv
- Founders: Karstein Birkeland; Frank Bruland
- Founded: 7 October 2020
- Registered: January 2025
- Headquarters: Bergen
- Colors: Black; Electric lime
- Storting: 0 / 169
- County councils: 0 / 639
- Municipal councils: 0 / 9,344

Website
- www.generasjonspartiet.no

The Generation Party (Norwegian: Generasjonspartiet, GP) is a political party in Norway founded in 2020 and registered in the official Party Register in January 2025. It is led by Gyda Oddekalv. The party's stated main objective is to expand the use of direct democracy in Norway, including binding referendums and digital participation tools.

== History ==
The party was founded in Bergen on 7 October 2020. Early organisational work is attributed to founders including Karstein Birkeland and Frank Bruland; Beate Løken later served as deputy leader. GP fielded limited constituency lists at the 2021 parliamentary election and stood lists in all counties for the 2025 parliamentary election, after gaining formal party registration that year.

== Political platform ==
GP states that its main goal is to implement direct democracy in Norway through constitutional, binding referendums and citizen voting on salient issues, supported by secure digital systems.

- Democratic reform: constitutional, binding referendums at national and local levels; support for e-voting and digital referendums authenticated by BankID; creation of citizen think tanks and participatory democratic processes.
- Digital democracy and data rights: digital sovereignty with individual control over personal data, voice and likeness; secure national digital infrastructure; transparency and algorithmic oversight in public-sector IT; impact assessments and ethical guidelines for AI in government.
- Energy and environment: electricity at cost price for domestic users; national control of energy resources; opposition to further onshore wind development and to electrification of the continental shelf; restrictions on petroleum activity in environmentally sensitive areas.
- Food and self-sufficiency: aims for national self-sufficiency in food and medicines; measures to strengthen primary producers; breaking perceived grocery-market monopolies; removing VAT on unprocessed raw ingredients.
- Tax and welfare: tax exemption on incomes up to NOK 500,000; pilots of a basic income to simplify welfare administration; removal of the wealth tax; credits for caregiving and community contributions.
- Housing: programme to build 125,000 new homes, including access to bomb shelters in central areas; measures to ease purchasing for first-time buyers; streamlined planning and permitting.
- Defence and total preparedness: “total defence” approach including civil-defence rebuild; air-defence coverage over major cities and military sites; investment in drones and munitions; strengthened maritime security and Coast Guard; stockpiles for medical and food supplies; emphasis on Nordic cooperation.
- Immigration and integration: “social contract” framing for integration; limits on the number of asylum seekers through quotas; emphasis on capacity, security screening, and work-first integration measures.
- Law and order: proposals on courts and legal safeguards; youth-crime prevention and rehabilitation; procurement reform and anti-waste measures in the public sector.

During the 2025 campaign, Oddekalv emphasised frequent referendums and proposed a higher threshold for sovereignty-transfer decisions such as EU membership (e.g. supermajority requirements).

== Organisation ==
The party's website lists national officers and local candidates; the party has organised grassroots participation via digital tools. The party maintains a youth wing, GP ungdom (15–25).

== Election results ==
=== Storting ===
Election	Leader	Votes	%	Seats	+/–	Position	Status
2021	Tone Coucheron	199	0.01%	0 / 169	New	23rd	Extra-parliamentary
2025	Gyda Oddekalv	21,589	0.67%	0 / 169	0	▲12th	Extra-parliamentary

== See also ==
- Direct democracy
- E-democracy
