= Consortium for Elections and Political Process Strengthening =

Former International Development Organization

The Consortium for Elections and Political Process Strengthening (CEPPS) was composed of non-profit organizations and had the stated aim of advancing and supporting democratic practices and institutions around the globe. Established in 1995, CEPPS was a combination of the International Foundation for Electoral Systems, the International Republican Institute and the National Democratic Institute.
