= Integrated farming =

Holistic agricultural management system

Integrated farming (IF), integrated production, or integrated farm management is a whole farm management system which aims to deliver more sustainable agriculture without compromising the quality or quantity of agricultural products. Integrated farming combines modern tools and technologies with traditional practices according to a given site and situation, often employing many different cultivation techniques in a small growing area.

== Definition ==
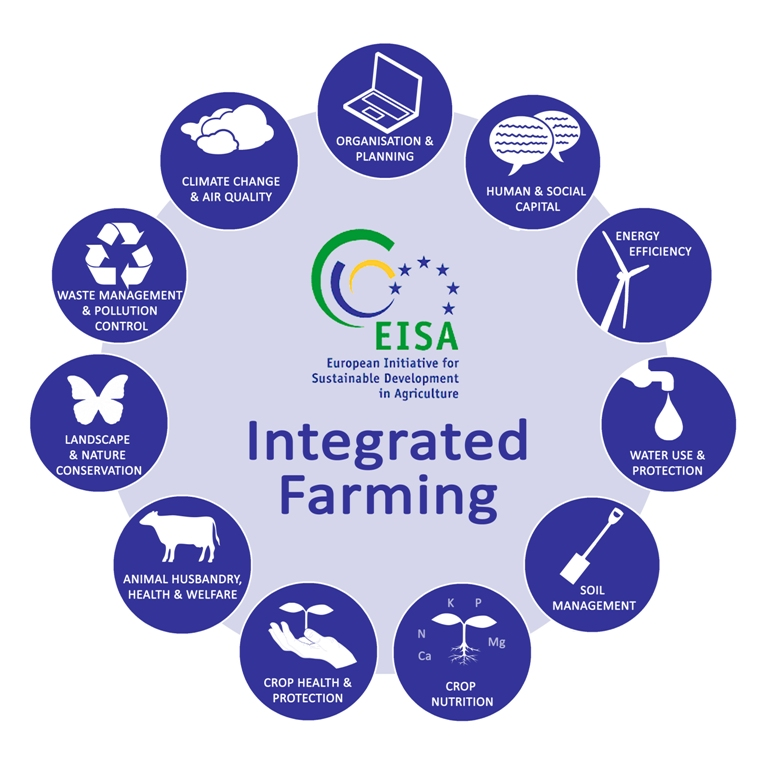
The holistic approach UNI 11233 new European bio standard: an integrated production system looks at and relates to the whole organic and bio farm

The International Organization of Biological Control (IOBC) describes integrated farming according to the UNI 11233-2009 European standard as a farming system where high-quality organic food, animal feed, fiber, and renewable energy are produced by using resources such as soil, water, air, and nature as well as regulating factors to farm sustainably and with as few polluting inputs as possible.

Particular emphasis is placed on an integrated organic approach which views the farm and its environmental surroundings as an intricately cross-linked whole, on the fundamental role and function of agro-ecosystems, on nutrient cycles, which are balanced and adapted to the demands of specific crops, and on the health and welfare of livestock residing on the farm. Preserving and enhancing soil fertility, maintaining and improving biodiversity, and adhering to ethical and social criteria are indispensable basic elements. Crop protection takes into account all biological, technical, and chemical methods, which then are balanced carefully with objectives to protect the environment, to maintain economic profitability, and to fulfill social or cultural requirements.

The European Initiative for Sustainable Development in Agriculture (EISA) has an Integrated Farming Framework, which provides additional explanations on key aspects of integrated farming. These include: Organization & Planning, Human & Social Capital, Energy Efficiency, Water Use & Protection, Climate Change & Air Quality, Soil Management, Crop Nutrition, Crop Health & Protection, Animal Husbandry, Health & Welfare, Landscape & Nature Conservation, and Waste Management Pollution Control.

In the UK, LEAF (Linking Environment and Farming) promotes a comparable model and defines Integrated Farm Management (IFM) as a whole-farm business approach that delivers more sustainable farming. LEAF's Integrated Farm Management consists of nine interrelated sections: Organization & Planning, Soil Management & Fertility, Crop Health & Protection, Pollution Control & By-Product Management, Animal Husbandry, Energy Efficiency, Water Management, and Landscape & Nature Conservation.

== Classification ==
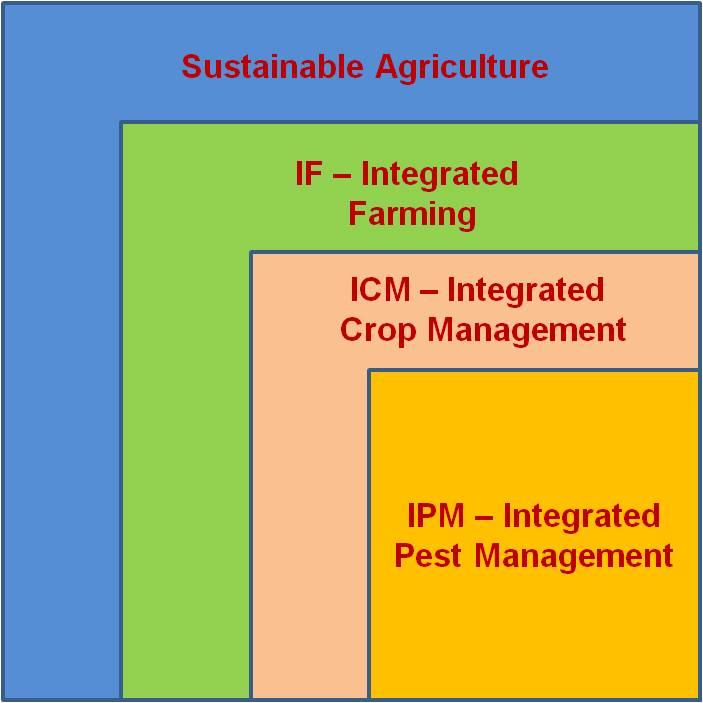
Integrated Farming in the context of sustainable agriculture

The Food and Agriculture Organization of the United Nations (FAO) promotes Integrated Pest Management (IPM) as the preferred approach to crop protection and regards it as a pillar of both sustainable intensification of crop production and pesticide risk reduction. IPM, thus, is an indispensable element of Integrated Crop Management, which in turn is an essential part of the holistic integrated farming approach towards sustainable agriculture.

In France, the Forum des Agriculteurs Responsables Respectueux de l'Environnement (FARRE) defines a set of common principles and practices to help farmers achieve these goals. These principles include:

- Producing sufficient high quality food, fibre, and industrial raw materials
- Meeting the demands of society
- Maintaining a viable farming business
- Caring for the environment
- Sustaining natural resources

The practices include:

- Organization and management
- Monitoring and auditing
- Crop protection
- Animal husbandry
- Soil and water management
- Crop nutrition
- Energy management
- Waste management and pollution prevention
- Wildlife and landscape management
- Crop rotation and variety choice

Keller, 1986 (quoted in Lütke Entrup et al., 1998 1) highlights that integrated crop management is not to be understood as a compromise between different agricultural production systems. Rather, it must be understood as a production system with targeted, dynamic, and continuous use and development of methods based on knowledge obtained from experiences in so-called conventional farming. In addition to natural scientific findings, impulses from organic farming are also taken up.

== History ==
Integrated Pest Management can be seen as a starting point for a holistic approach to agricultural production. Following the excessive use of crop protection chemicals, first steps in IPM were taken in fruit production at the end of the 1950s. The concept was then further developed globally in all major crops. On the basis of results of the system-oriented IPM approach, models for integrated crop management were developed. Initially, animal husbandry was not seen as part of such integrated approaches (Lütke Entrup et al., 1998 1).

In the years to follow, various national and regional initiatives and projects were formed. These include LEAF (Linking Environment And Farming) in the UK, FNL (Fördergemeinschaft Nachhaltige Landwirtschaft e.V.) in Germany, FARRE (Forum des Agriculteurs Responsables Respectueux de l'Environnement) in France, FILL (Fördergemeinschaft Integrierte Landbewirtschaftung Luxemburg) in Luxembourg, and OiB (Odling i Balans) in Sweden. However, there are few if any figures available on the uptake of integrated farming systems in the major crops throughout Europe, which has led to a recommendation by the European Economic and Social Committee in February 2014 that the EU should carry out an in-depth analysis of integrated production in Europe in order to obtain insights into the current situation and potential developments. There is evidence, however, that between 60 and 80% of pome, stone, and soft fruits were grown, controlled, and marketed according to "Integrated Production Guidelines" in 1999 in Germany.

LEAF is a sustainable farming organization established in the UK in 1991 which promotes the uptake and knowledge sharing of integrated farm management by the LEAF Network, a series of LEAF demonstration farms and innovation centres. The LEAF Marque System was established in 2003 and is an environmental assurance system recognising more sustainably farmed products. The principles of integrated farm management (IFM) underpin the requirements of LEAF Marque certification, as set out in the LEAF Marque Standard. LEAF Marque is a global system and adopts a whole farm approach, certifying the entire farm business and its products. In 2019, LEAF Marque businesses were in 29 countries, and 39% of UK fruit and vegetables were grown by LEAF Marque-certified businesses.

Animal husbandry and integrated crop management (ICM) often are just two branches of one agricultural enterprise. In modern agriculture, animal husbandry and crop production must be understood as interlinked sectors which cannot be looked at in isolation, as the context of agricultural systems leads to tight interdependencies. Uncoupling animal husbandry from arable production (too high stocking rates) is therefore not considered in accordance with the principles and objectives of integrated farming (Lütke Entrup et al., 1998 1). Accordingly, holistic concepts for integrated farming or integrated farm management such as the EISA Integrated Farming Framework, and the concept of sustainable agriculture, are increasingly developed, promoted, and implemented at the global level.

Related to the 'sustainable intensification' of agriculture, an objective which in part is discussed controversially, efficiency of resource use becomes increasingly important today. Environmental impacts of agricultural production depend on the efficiency achieved when using natural resources and all other means of production. The input per kg of output, the output per kg of input, and the output achieved per hectare of land—a limited resource in the light of world population growth—are decisive figures for evaluating the efficiency and the environmental impact of agricultural systems. Efficiency parameters therefore offer important evidence how efficiency and environmental impacts of agriculture can be judged and where improvements can or must be made.

Against this background, documentation as well as certification schemes and farm audits such as LEAF Marque play an increasing role in evaluating and improving agricultural practices. More sector- or product-oriented approaches, such as SAI Platform principles and practices and GlobalGap, pursue similar goals.

== Objectives ==
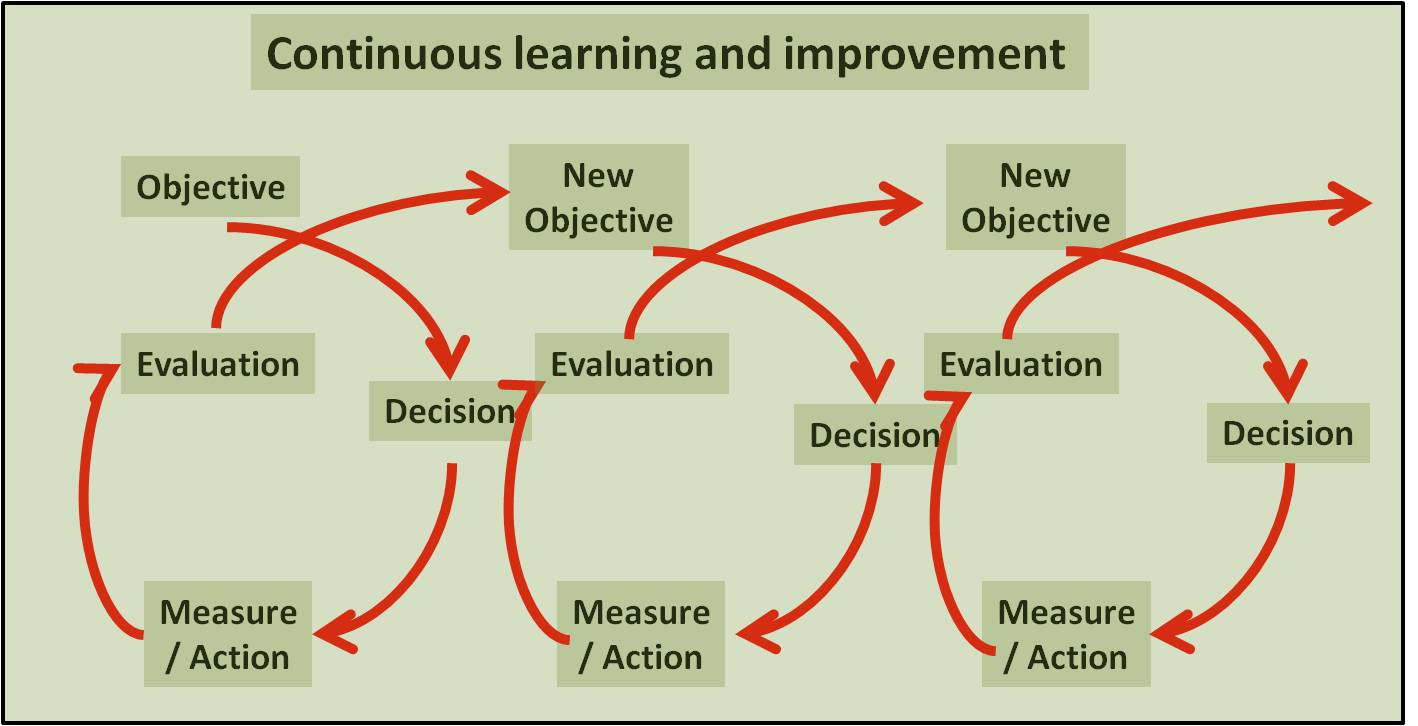
Continuous learning process in integrated farming

Integrated farming is based on attention to detail, continuous improvement and managing all resources available.

Being bound to sustainable development, the underlying three dimensions economic development, social development and environmental protection are thoroughly considered in the practical implementation of integrated farming. However, the need for profitability is a decisive prerequisite: To be sustainable, the system must be profitable, as profits generate the possibility to support all activities outlined in the IF Framework.

As a management and planning strategy, integrated farming incorporates regular benchmarking of goals against results. The EISA Integrated Farming Framework idea places a strong emphasis on farmers' understanding of their own performance. Farmers become aware of accomplishments as well as inadequacies by evaluating their performance on a regular basis, and by paying attention to detail, they may continuously work on improving the entire farming operation as well as their economic performance: According to research in the United Kingdom, lowering fertilizer and chemical inputs to proportions proportionate to crop demand allowed for cost reductions ranging from £2,500 to £10,000 per year and per farm

.

== Prevalence ==
Following first developments in the 1950s, various approaches to integrated pest management, integrated crop management, integrated production, and integrated farming were developed worldwide, including Germany, Switzerland, US, Australia, and India. As the implementation of integrated farming should be handled according to the given site and situation instead of following strict rules and recipes, the concept is applicable all over the world.

== Criticism ==
Environmental organizations have criticized integrated farming. That is in part due to the fact that there are European Organic Regulations such as (EC) No 834/2007 or the new draft from 2014 but no comparable regulations for integrated farming. Whereas organic farming and the Bio-Siegel in Germany for example are legally protected, EU Commission has not yet considered to start working on a comparable framework or blueprint for integrated farming. When products are marketed as Controlled Integrated Produce, according control mechanisms and quality-labels are not based on national or European directives but are established and handled by private organizations and quality schemes such as LEAF Marque.
