= ACE Electoral Knowledge Network =

Election worker website

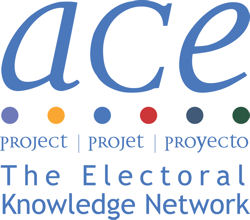
- Company type: Nonprofit
- Website type: Election Information and Expert's Network
- Available in: English, Spanish, French, Russian, Arabic
- Headquarters: Stockholm, Sweden
- Website: aceproject.org
- Commercial: No
- Registration: Optional (for Practitioner's Network)
- Launched: October 1, 1998; 27 years ago
- Current status: Active

The ACE Electoral Knowledge Network is a web portal with information on elections designed to meet the needs of people working in the electoral field.

== Goals ==
The goal of the ACE network is to provide knowledge to people working in the field elections, with the intention of supporting credible and transparent electoral processes with emphasis on sustainability, professionalism and trust.

== Website ==
Most activities of the ACE network are carried out through the ACE website. The website is divided into a number of sections:

- Elections today contains information on current affairs in elections, such as news articles, upcoming events and an election calendar.
- Encyclopaedia presents texts and articles on a number of electoral topics (for example Electoral Systems or Elections and Technology).
- Comparative Data provides statistics (graphs, pie charts etc.) and data on election-related topics.
- Electoral Materials is a virtual library with sample materials (ballot papers, electoral laws, publications etc.) from different countries.
- Support and Advice holds information on areas of electoral support (election observation and assistance) and links to the ACE expert network.
- Regions and Countries is a portal page for region- or country-specific information.
- About ACE has more information about the ACE network and its structure.

The full website is fully available in English while much content is also available in Spanish, French, Arabic and Russian.

== Experts ==
Part of ACE is the Practitioners' Network – an online community of experts in the field of elections. The members of the Practitioners' Network share a private online platform where they discuss electoral issues, exchange experiences and connect to fellow experts. Any user can submit a question to the Practitioners' Network; the question will be discussed among the experts and the expert replies forwarded to the user.

The Practitioners' Network is open to applications; membership of the network is free but members are required to have "several years of experience of working in a senior position for one or a number of organisations within the electoral field" and/or "proven expertise" in a specific area of elections.

== History ==
The ACE network was created in 1998 as the ACE (Administration and Cost of Elections) Project by International IDEA, IFES and UNDESA. At this time, the project focused solely on election administration with the aim to create an encyclopaedia with texts on how to administer electoral processes. However, the project developed further into a more interactive network with a focus wider than just electoral administration. In 2006, to reflect the new identity of the project, the name was changed to the ACE Electoral Knowledge Network (with the letters ACE no longer standing for Administration and Cost of Elections).

== Organisation ==
ACE is a collaboration between nine Partner Organisations: The Carter Center, International Institute for Democracy and Electoral Assistance (International IDEA), Electoral Institute for Sustainable Democracy in Africa (EISA), Elections Canada, the Federal Electoral Institute of Mexico (IFE), International Foundation for Electoral Systems (IFES) and the UN agencies UNDESA, UNDP and UNEAD. The European Commission is an ex officio member.

The highest decision-making body of ACE is the Steering Board, consisting of representatives from the Partner Organisations. The day-to-day management of the project is carried out by the ACE Secretariat, currently hosted by International IDEA. The Secretariat is assisted in its tasks by the Programme Advisory Board with representatives from the ACE Partner Organisations.
