= Cutshaw =

Cutshaw is a surname. Notable people with the surname include:

- George Cutshaw (1887–1973), MLB player
- Kenneth Cutshaw (active from 1982), American lawyer, diplomat, professor, business executive and entrepreneur
- Wilfred Emory Cutshaw (1838–1907), colonel in the Confederate Army and city engineer for Richmond, Virginia
