= Central Directorate for Electoral Services =

Italian electoral body

The Central Directorate of Electoral Services (Italian: Direzione Centrale per i Servizi Elettorali) is the national election commission in Italy. It is the main body responsible for conducting and overseeing elections in Italy. However, each Municipal Electoral Office of a given area decides whether citizens are allowed to vote (along with other matters), whereas the Ministry of the Interior compiles the election information electronically, analyses the results of elections and referendums, and has the duty of announcing their results officially.

== Responsibilities ==
The Central Directorate has the responsibility over:

- Equipment and materials
- Supervising and overseeing the polling stations organized by the Ministry of the Interior.
