= Association of Central and Eastern European Election Officials =

The Association of European Election Officials or ACEEEO was an organization of election management bodies founded in 1991 to promote the institutionalization and professionalization of democratic procedures in Europe. The organization held annual conferences to discuss theoretical and practical issues important to its members. It dissolved on 11 March 2022 in response to the 2022 Russian invasion of Ukraine.

== History ==
ACEEEO was founded in reaction to a conference hosted by the International Foundation for Electoral Systems (IFES). The organization functioned as an entity separate from IFES since.

The ACEEEO held its 21st annual conference in September 2012, in Sarajevo, Bosnia and Herzegovina.

== Mission ==
According to the association's website, its mission was "to provide a non-partisan forum, independent of national governments, for the exchange of information among election officials and experts throughout the region covered by the Association to discuss and act upon ways to promote open and transparent elections with the objective of supporting good governance and democracy."

Additionally, there were 6 objectives which ACEEEO put forward:

- Promotion of open and transparent elections throughout an exchange of experiences and information relating to election law and procedure, technology, administrative practice, voter education;
- Promotion of the training and further education of election officials and international observers;
- Promotion of the principle of independent and impartial election authorities and administrators;
- Development of professional election officials with high integrity, strong sense of public service, knowledge of electoral practice, and commitment to democratic elections;
- Promotion of the principle of participation in electoral processes by citizens, political contestants, and non-partisan civic organizations; and
- Development of resources for election-related information and research

== Member countries ==
As of 2009, the election commissions of the following countries were members of ACEEEO:

- Albania
- Armenia
- Azerbaijan
- Belarus
- Bosnia and Herzegovina
- Bulgaria
- Croatia
- Georgia
- Hungary
- Kazakhstan
- Kosovo
- Kyrgyzstan
- Latvia
- Lithuania
- Macedonia
- Moldova
- Montenegro
- Romania
- Russia (Central Election Commission of Russia)
- Slovakia
- Serbia
- Turkey
- Ukraine (Central Election Commission of Ukraine)

On 7 March 2022, Croatia, Lithuania, Poland and Slovenia left the ACEEEO. Next day, 8 March, Ukraine left the ACEEEO. On 11 March 2022, the General Assembly of the ACEEEO decided to dissolve the Association.
