= European Initiative for Sustainable Development in Agriculture =

Group of seven national associations

The European Initiative for Sustainable Development in Agriculture (EISA) e.V. is an organisation of national agricultural associations from seven Member States of the European Union as full members and six European organisations of the farm supply chain as associated members. EISA aims at the further development of integrated farming in Europe and at a growing implementation of integrated farming throughout European agriculture.

== Organisation and Members ==
EISA e.V. was founded in Bonn, Germany, in 2001 according to German association law.

Member organisations include:

- France (FARRE, Forum des Agriculteurs Responsables Respectueux de l'Environnement)
- Luxembourg (FILL, Förderverein Integrierte Landbewirtschaftung Luxemburg)
- Germany (FML, Forum Moderne Landwirtschaft e.V.)
- Hungary (GOSZ, Grain Producers' Association-Hungary)
- United Kingdom (LEAF, Linking Environment And Farming)
- Sweden (OiB, Odling i Balans)
- The Netherlands (Skylark Foundation, Stichting Veldleeuwerik)

ECPA (European Crop Protection Association), ELO (European Landowners Organization), FEFAC (European Feed Manufacturers' Federation), Fertilizers Europe, IFAH-Europe (International Federation of Animal Health-Europe) as well as SAI-Platform (Sustainable Agriculture Initiative Platform) are associated EISA members.

== Purpose ==
The purpose of the Association is:

- to establish and promote dialogue on sustainable agriculture,
- to support and develop sustainable agriculture at European level through the implementation of integrated farming,
- to bring together a broad range of organisations in Europe to support and develop sustainable agriculture as well as practical, progressive and modern farming methods.

The "EISA Integrated Farming Framework" is one focal point of the organisation's activities. Further activities include intensive participation in European stakeholder dialogues and workshops as well as publicity measures on integrated farming on the European level.

== EISA Integrated Farming Framework ==
A first working paper on such a European definition and characterisation of integrated farming was presented by EISA in July 2003. Following discussions with a wide range of European experts, a second draft was published in November 2005, and the fine-tuned full paper in September 2006. However, following EISA's understanding of integrated farming as an equally holistic and dynamic system, EISA members have decided to review and update the framework on a regular basis. Updated versions were since presented in September 2009 and in February 2012.

In this detailed guideline, integrated farming is characterised as sustainable production system which allows farmers to optimise their farm management, to raise further awareness and continually improve everyday practice on farm in order to meet future environmental, economic and social challenges and hence achieve parallel progress in all dimensions of sustainable development.

== Publications ==
- EISA – A Common Codex for Integrated Farming;
- ilu & EISA – Indicators for a Sustainable Development in Agriculture, 2002;
- ilu & EISA – Strategies for Sustainability from an Economic Point of View, 2002;
- EISA – Success Stories of Integrated Farming in Europe, 2004;
- EISA – EISA Integrated Farming Framework, 2012;
- EISA – Sustainable Agriculture: What is it all about? 2012;
- Fertilizers Europe & EISA – Integrated Farming, A holistic system, 2013.
