= Kenneth Cutshaw =

American lawyer and businessman

Kenneth Andrew Cutshaw
- Born: Sevier County, Tennessee, U.S.
- Citizenship: United States
- Education: Master of Laws, J.D., B.A
- Alma mater: American University, University of Tennessee
- Occupations: Lawyer, Business Executive
- Known for: Served as Deputy Assistant Secretary of Commerce Department for the Administration of President George H. W. Bush and Chief of Staff in the Commerce Department for the Administration of President Ronald Reagan

Kenneth Cutshaw is an American lawyer and businessman. He served as Deputy Assistant Secretary of Commerce Department in the Administration of President George H. W. Bush and a Chief of Staff in the Commerce Department for the Administration of Ronald Reagan.

== Early life and education ==
Born and raised in rural East Tennessee, in the county of Sevier and at the foothills of the Great Smoky Mountains National Park, Cutshaw completed his elementary and high school at the Sevier County school system.

Cutshaw holds a Master of Laws from American University; a J.D. and B.A from the University of Tennessee; and executive business certificates from the Indian Institute of Management Ahmedabad and Duke University.

== Career ==
=== Teaching ===
Cutshaw was a founder of a post-Soviet private university (Georgian American University) in the Country of Georgia, where he served as its first law dean. He has been an adjunct professor at Emory University, Georgia Tech, Duke University and Georgia State University teaching law and global business.

=== Legal ===
Cutshaw was a partner of the Holland & Knight law firm, where his practice focused on international transactions. He was the legal counsel for the 1982 World Exposition.

He is a member of the legal bars in Washington D.C., North Carolina, Georgia and Tennessee. He is also a member of the International Bar Association, American Bar Association, Inter-Pacific Bar Association and Indian National Bar Association.

=== US Government ===
Cutshaw was a key participant in the international development of export control policies after the dissolution of the Soviet Union while working as an appointed Senior Executive with the USA Government.

He was Deputy Assistant Secretary of Commerce Department serving in the Administration of President George H. W. Bush and a Chief of Staff in Commerce Department for the Administration of President Ronald Reagan.

He was appointed a diplomat under the Vienna Convention as the Honorary Consul for India in the U.S.

=== Business ===
Cutshaw is the former CEO and President of Garden City Group (GCG), a legal settlement distributor.

He was the President and Chief Legal Officer of Quiznos Restaurants where he secured the largest franchise transaction in history by unit count by executing a franchisee agreement in China. He was the Executive Vice President and Chief Legal Officer of Church's Chicken Restaurants. He also served as CEO of Global Network Growth, Inc., a hospitality industry adviser and a Partner with FBE Ventures, a restaurant investment group in Malaysia.

He co-founded two restaurant groups, Cheers Restaurants and Red, Hot & Blue BBQ.

=== NGO leadership ===
Cutshaw was the chairman, President and board member of the American Council of Young Political Leaders for over 25 years and he currently serves on the Board and in leadership for the International Foundation for Electoral Systems.

== Books ==
Cutshaw has published three books by Thomson Reuters West: They include

- Doing Business in India
- Doing Business in China
- Doing Business in Russia

== Personal life ==
Cutshaw is married with three children and resides in Durham, North Carolina.

== See also ==
- International Foundation for Electoral Systems
