= Norwegian Directorate of Elections =

Government agency of Norway

- Valgdirektoratet

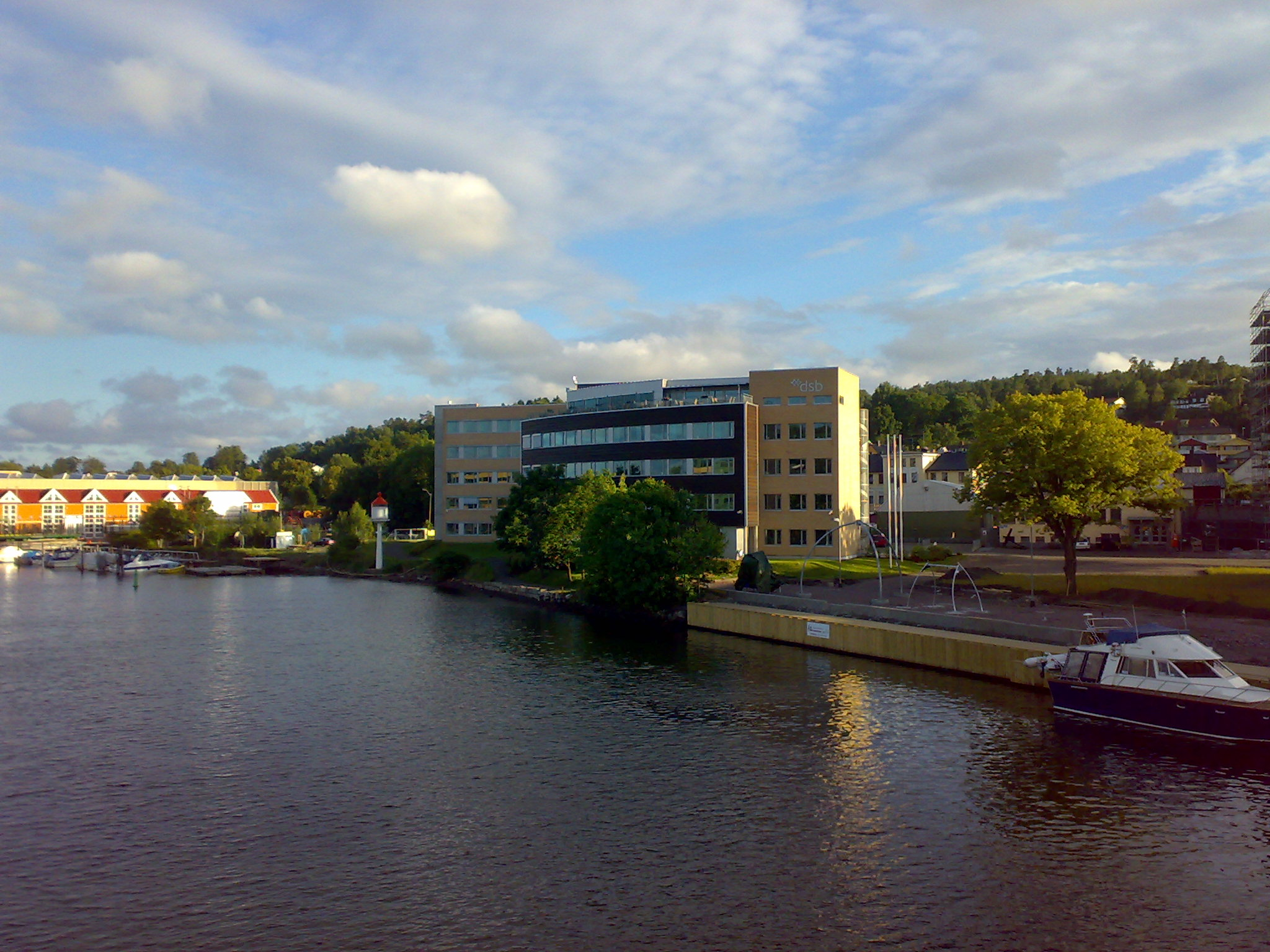
- Headquarters at Kaldnes in Tønsberg

Government agency overview
- Jurisdiction: Norway
- Headquarters: Tønsberg
- Minister responsible: Minister of Local Government and Regional Development
- Parent department: Ministry of Local Government and Regional Development
- Website: valg.no

The Norwegian Directorate of Elections (Norwegian: Valgdirektoratet) is a government agency subordinate the Ministry of Local Government and Regional Development. An election commission, it is responsible for coordinating and managing national and local elections in Norway. The operative aspects of the election are conducted by the municipalities.

The agency is located in Tønsberg, where it shares premises with the Norwegian Directorate for Civil Protection. The agency was established on 1 January 2016. The first election it oversaw were the jointly held 2017 Norwegian parliamentary election and the 2017 Norwegian Sámi parliamentary election on 11 September 2017.
