= Bill Sweeney (CEO) =

American businessman

William Sweeney, Jr.
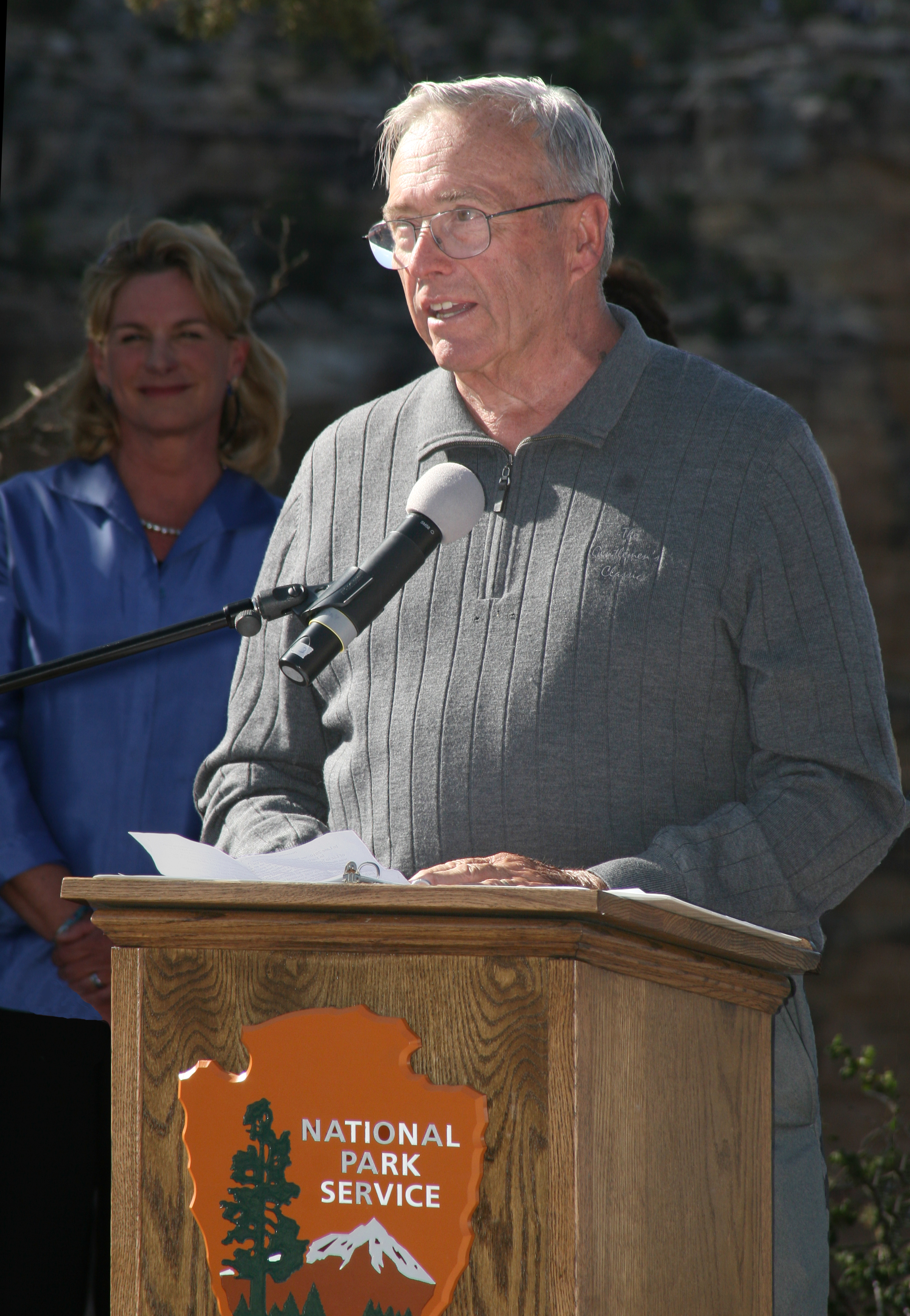
- Sweeney in 2013
- Education: American University
- Occupations: Businessman, CEO
- Employer: American University
- Title: former Chief Executive Officer of the International Foundation for Electoral Systems
- Predecessor: Jean-Pierre Kingsley

William Sweeney, Jr. OBE is a businessman and politician who was the president and chief executive officer of the International Foundation for Electoral Systems (IFES) from 2009 to 2018. He currently serves as an executive-in-residence at the American University School of Public Affairs.

== Education ==
Sweeney is a graduate of the American University School of Public Affairs with a B.A. in Political Science.

== Career ==
After graduation, Bill Sweeney worked for the Montgomery County delegation to the Maryland General Assembly in Annapolis for the 1973 and 1974 sessions.

In February 1974, he joined the Democratic Congressional Campaign Committee (DCCC) as research director. In July 1977, he was appointed executive director of the DCCC by Chairman James C. Corman (D-CA). He directed the committee's activities for the 1978 and 1980 congressional elections.

In February, 1981 Bill Sweeney was appointed deputy chairman of the Democratic National Committee (DNC) by Chairman Charles T. Manatt. He was the conference manager for the 1982 Midterm Party Conference in Philadelphia; handled congressional liaison for the DNC; and supervised the construction of the party's first headquarters which opened in February, 1985.

From 1985 to 1991, Sweeney was president of Washington Resources & Strategy, Inc. The firm provided consulting services to Democratic political candidates as well as a spectrum of associations and corporations in Asia, Europe and the United States. Sweeney closed the firm in 1991 to become director of government relations for Electronic Data Systems (EDS), an information services company. He was initially responsible for congressional affairs. In 1994, he became executive director. In 2000, he was appointed vice president for global government affairs of EDS. He was responsible for managing the Washington, D.C., office as well as EDS relations with government on a global basis. After the acquisition of EDS by Hewlett Packard, Sweeney retired from EDS in March, 2009. The Hill named Sweeney amongst the top corporate lobbyists in the business.

Sweeney was elected a member of the board of directors of British American Business Council, the European-American Business Council, the Information Technology Association of America, the National Foreign Trade Council, the U.S. Council for International Business, the U.S.–New Zealand Business Council and the Fund for American Studies. Sweeney also served on the advisory board of the Smithsonian Environmental Research Center (SERC) from 2000 to 2007 and as chairman of the board from 2003 until 2007. For his service to SERC, he was honored with the Issac Hull Medal. He also served on the State Department Advisory Committee on International Communications from 1993 to 2008.

Sweeney was also elected to the board of directors of the International Foundation for Electoral Systems in 1993. He became chairman of the board in 1999, and resigned in 2001. Sweeney was an international elections observer in the Philippines (1986), Russia (1994), Nicaragua (1996) and Jamaica (1997). He also conducted political training in advance of Hungary's first free election since 1945 for the National Democratic Institute (NDI). Sweeney is the co-founder of the American University Campaign Management Institute. He served as director of the program from 1988 to 1992. He has lectured at the American University Advocacy Institute and serves on the board of directors of the American University Center for Congressional and Presidential Studies. He contributed to Campaigns and Elections, American Style, co-authored Campaign Groundwork: Strategy Planning and Management among many other published works, interviews and lectures.

The Joint Congressional Committee on the Inaugural Ceremonies invited Bill Sweeney to participate in the organization of the inaugurations of U.S. President George H. W. Bush, Bill Clinton, George W. Bush and Barack Obama.

On June 2, 2009, Sweeney was appointed chief executive officer and president of IFES and stepped down from the position on November 1, 2018. On June 19, 2009, Sweeney was made an honorary officer of the Most Excellent Order of the British Empire because of his efforts to strengthen business relationships between the United States and United Kingdom.

He currently serves on the Kofi Annan Commission on Elections and Democracy in the Digital Age. In 2019, he joined the American University School of Public Affairs as an executive-in-residence.
