= Else Kåss Furuseth =

Norwegian comedian (born 1980)

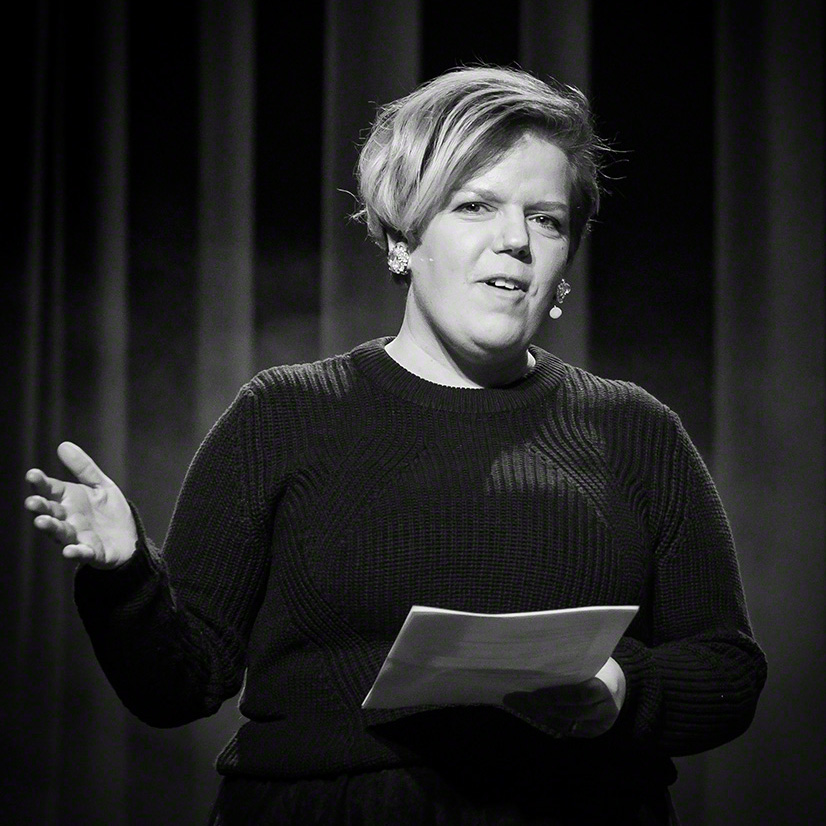
- Born: 18 July 1980 (age 46); Jessheim, Norway
- Education: Kristiania University College; University of Oslo
- Occupations: Comedian, actress, television host

Else Kåss Furuseth (born 18 July 1980) is a Norwegian comedian, actress and television host.

== Personal life and education ==
Born in Jessheim on 18 July 1980, Furuseth studied at the University of Oslo and at the Kristiania University College.

She married chef Tommy Johansen in 2024, in a ceremony held in Oslo Spektrum.

== Career ==
Joining a group of stand-up comedians in the early 2000s, Furuseth started contributing to radio shows in NRK, and for TV 2. Her breakthrough came in the show Torsdag kveld fra Nydalen, which aired from 2009 to 2014. Her film debut was in Hjelp, vi er i filmbransjen in 2011.

Working for the Norwegian television channel TVNorge from 2016 to 2019, Furuseth won three Gullruten awards for her documentary series. From 2019 she hosted the talk show Kåss til kvelds for NRK. The show earned her Gullruten awards both in 2020 and 2023.

In December 2025 she was awarded the prize Ålreit dame (Alright lady) from the Harry Hole foundation, a foundation chaired by crime fiction writer Jo Nesbø financed by his book royalties.

== Politics ==
In 2024 she founded a political party, the Loneliness Party.
