= Gyda Oddekalv =

Norwegian politician and rapper

Leader of Generasjonspartiet
- Incumbent
- Assumed office 17 March 2023
- Preceded by: Barbro Paulsen

Gyda Ulrike Løken Sirseth Oddekalv (born 7 July 1993), commonly known as Gyda Oddekalv, is a Norwegian politician, healthcare worker, and former rapper. She has served as the leader of Generasjonspartiet (GP) since March 2023.

== Early life and education ==
Oddekalv was born on 7 July 1993 in Bergen, Norway. She is the daughter of environmental activist Kurt Oddekalv (1957–2021). During her childhood, she sang in a choir, played the cello, and wrote her own poems and songs.

She became interested in rap music at the age of 12 and participated in the sixth season of Norske Talenter in 2014.

In 2016, she signed a recording contract with MTG under the stage name Lenole.

Oddekalv has professional experience from the healthcare sector and studied nursing at Oslo and Akershus University College.

In 2022, she began studying law at the University of Bergen.

== Political career ==
In March 2023, Oddekalv became leader of Generasjonspartiet (GP), a political party founded in Bergen in October 2020.

In November 2025, Oddekalv launched the Democracy App, a platform that allows paying users to vote directly on political issues, submit proposals, and discuss topics with other users. The app was presented by Generasjonspartiet as a tool for increasing direct democratic participation. The requirement for users to pay in order to participate in voting through the app received criticism from some political commentators.

In August 2025, Oddekalv was asked to leave the studio during a live broadcast of NRK's Dagsnytt 18 after repeatedly interrupting fellow participant Frøya Sjursæther of the Green Party (MDG) and making accusations against her. The debate concerned Generasjonspartiet's distribution of 50,000 fake wind power notices during the election campaign, which Oddekalv defended as a lawful campaign tactic. NRK stated that the decision was made to calm the situation and allow the programme to conclude as scheduled.

== Filmography ==
- 2014: Norske Talenter, season 6
- 2016: Line dater Norge, episode 2
- 2025: 20-stjerners sommerferie
- 2025: Norges smarteste realitydeltaker, season 2
