= Electoral Institute for Sustainable Democracy in Africa =

South African organisation

The Electoral Institute for Sustainable Democracy in Africa (former Electoral Institute of Southern Africa), or EISA, is an organization founded in 1996 in Johannesburg to "promote credible elections, participatory democracy, human rights culture and the strengthening of governance institutions for the consolidation of democracy in Africa."

== Program areas ==
According to their website programme areas that they participate in include:

- Democracy, conflict management, and electoral education
- Elections and political processes
- Balloting and electoral services
- Governance (political parties, APRM, institutions of governance and local governance)
- Online democracy encyclopedia
- Research and information (including a specialised library and in-house publications)

== Funding ==
EISA lists the following organizations as donors:

- Belgian Government
- Canadian High Commission (CIDA)
- Charles Stewart Mott Foundation
- Conferences, Workshops and Cultural Initiatives (EU-CWCI)
- Department for International Development (DIFD)
- European Union (EU)
- Finish Embassy, Pretoria
- Deutsche Gesellschaft für Internationale Zusammenarbeit (GIZ)
- Irish Embassy
- Konrad Adenauer Foundation (KAF)
- New Zealand Embassy
- Royal Danish Embassy
- Norwegian Agency for Development Cooperation (NORAD)
- Norwegian Centre for Human Rights (NCHR)
- Norwegian Institute for Human Rights (NIHR)
- Open Society Foundation South Africa (OSF-SA)
- Open Society Initiative (OSI)
- Open Society Institute for West Africa (OSIWA)
- Open Society Initiative for Southern Africa (OSISA)
- Swiss Agency for Development and Cooperation (SDC)
- Swedish International Development Agency (SIDA)
- USAID RCSA

== Activities ==
In 2004, EISA deployed an observation mission to Malawi for the presidential and legislative elections.

EISA works with the African Union Democracy and Electoral Assistance Unit (DEAU). Support in 2008 was done in conjunction with the Carter Center and the International Foundation for Electoral Systems (IFES).

=== Kader Asmal ===
When Kader Asmal, a member of the ANC, accused the Parliament of South Africa of wasting money by not monitoring chapter nine institutions such as the South African Human Rights Commission and the Commission for Gender Equality, EISA hosted the conference.
