= International Foundation for Electoral Systems =

International non-profit organisation

International Foundation for Electoral Systems (IFES)
- Established: 1987; 39 years ago
- President: Anthony Banbury
- Chair: Amb. William C. Eacho & Hon. J. Kenneth Blackwell
- Budget: $70 million
- Address: 2011 Crystal Drive, 10th Floor, Arlington County, Virginia 22202
- Location: Crystal City, Virginia, U.S.
- Website: ifes.org

The International Foundation for Electoral Systems (IFES) is an international, non-profit organization founded in 1987. Based in Arlington, Virginia, United States, the organization assists and supports elections and electoral stakeholders. Since 1987, IFES has worked in 145 countries and has programs in more than 50 countries throughout Asia-Pacific, Africa, Eurasia, the Middle East, and North Africa, and the Americas.

IFES is a non-governmental organization registered as a 501(c)(3) in the United States. According to IFES, they work to advance good governance and democratic rights by providing technical assistance to election officials, collaborating with civil society and public institutions to increase participation in the political process, and applying field-based research to improve the electoral cycle and develop trusted electoral bodies. IFES is supervised by a board of directors made up of Democratic and Republican politicians and members of the international community. Since 2018, the president of IFES is Anthony Banbury who replaced Bill Sweeney.

== History ==
IFES was founded by F. Clifton White on September 19, 1987, as a response to Ronald Reagan's 1982 Westminster speech, in which he stressed the importance of promoting democracy. IFES was established along with other United States federal-government-funded organizations claiming to focus on democracy promotion, including the National Endowment for Democracy (NED), the National Democratic Institute for International Affairs (NDI), and the International Republican Institute (IRI), all established in 1983.

=== Major events ===
In 1989, IFES began its first project, which focused on the Paraguayan general elections held that year. By 1990, IFES had established its first field office in Haiti. In 1991, IFES convened a conference that established the Association of Central and Eastern European Election Officials (ACEEEO), its first cooperative agreement with USAID, and opened a new Resource Center.

In 1995, IFES embarked on a joint venture with International Republican Institute and the National Democratic Institute for International Affairs to create the Consortium for Elections and Political Process Strengthening (CEPPS). It is a cooperative agreement supervised by the United States Agency for International Development (USAID) Office of Democracy and Governance, which is the principal contractor for the Office of Democracy and Government's elections and political processes program which provides technical assistance and support to USAID missions worldwide.

In 1995, IFES also accomplished its first surveys in Russia and Ukraine. The first IFES-created non-government organization, CENTRAS, also became private at this time as a continuation of the IFES's "Civic Voice" project in Romania. In 1996, IFES received its first international appointment from Organization for Security and Co-operation in Europe (OSCE: Bosnia and Herzegovina) and, in 1997, worked with the Association of Caribbean Electoral Organizations (ACEO) to adopt the San Juan Declaration which is IFES' first disability effort.

In 1998, IFES partnered up with International IDEA and UNDESA, with funding from USAID, to release the Administration and Cost of Elections Project. ACE became one of the most valued and best-known international depositories of knowledge on managing elections focused on the administrative and cost implications of the choices available. In 2006 the name was changed to the ACE Electoral Knowledge Network (with the letters ACE no longer standing for Administration and Cost of Elections) and launched a new online knowledge repository that provides information and advice on improving elections and the elections process.

In 1998, IFES also opened its first field office in Asia located in the Philippines. In 1999, as part of its youth and elections programs, IFES introduced a 10-day Summer Democracy Camp for middle and high school students. The Democracy Camps teach youngsters about democracy and how to participate in the political process. The first Democracy Camp program was in Uzbekistan during the summer of 1999.

In 2002, IFES worked on its first-ever domestic projects which focused on the 2002 Florida elections. In 2002, voters with disabilities were able to use IFES' Tactile Ballot Guide in Sierra Leone's May 2002 presidential and parliamentary elections. That was the first time that the visually impaired were able to cast their ballots unassisted and in secret in Africa.

In 2003, IFES acquired The Center for Democracy, an organization founded in 1985 by Allen Weinstein. In 2005, IFES established the Charles T. Manatt Democracy Awards to pay tribute to outstanding men and women who are committed to freedom and democracy, just like Ambassador Manatt. IFES awards three individuals each year: one Democrat, one Republican, and a member of the international community to highlight the fact that democracy work transcends political barriers and national borders.

As part of IFES' 20th anniversary, in 2007, it hosted the fourth Global Electoral Organization Conference (GEO Conference) in Washington. This conference brought together 200 election officials and democracy advocates from 67 countries to discuss the most pressing issues in the field of election administration. With global attention on the 2016 U.S. presidential election, IFES gathered 550 participants from 90 countries for the 2016 U.S. Election Program and Seventh Global Elections Organization Conference (GEO-7) from November 6–10. The 2016 USEP and GEO-7 was the largest international gathering of election professionals of the year and the 13th hosted by IFES since 1992. The event brought together election officials, parliamentarians and diplomats from around the world to observe and learn about the U.S. electoral system as well as discuss elections and voting from comparative international perspectives.

== The Prizes ==
IFES gives two annual awards: the Joe C. Baxter Award and the Charles T. Manatt Democracy Award.

Year	Baxter Award for Election Practitioners	Democracy Award
2019	Alan Wall (Australia)	Margot Wallström (Sweden)
2018	Dong Nguyen Huu (Mexico)	Her Excellency Ellen Johnson Sirleaf (Liberia)
2017	Tamar Zhvania (Georgia)	His Excellency Luis Almagro Lemes (Uruguay)
2016	Chafik Sarsar (Tunisia)	Nay Lin Soe (Myanmar)
2015	Michael Maley (Australia)	Prof. Attahiru Jega (Nigeria)
2014	Christiana Thorpe (Sierra Leone)	Maria Corina Machado (Venezuela)
2013	Jørgen Elklit (Denmark)	Dr. Leonardo Valdes Zurita (Mexico)
2012	Christian Monsod (Philippines)	Maimuna Mwidau (Kenya)
2011	Delia Ferreira Rubio (Argentina)	Judge Johann Kriegler (South Africa)
2010	Kwadwo Afari-Gyan (Ghana)	Ziad Baroud (Lebanon)
2009	Rafael López Pintor (Spain)	

== Leadership ==
=== Executive ===
- Anthony Banbury, President/CEO
- Natasha Campbell, General Counsel and Vice President for Labor Relations & Human Resources
- Katherine Ellena, Vice President, Programs
- Michael Meenan, Chief Financial Officer
- Chad Vickery, Vice President, Global Strategy and Technical Leadership

=== Board of Directors ===
- William C. Eacho, Chairman
- Amb. J. Kenneth Blackwell, Co-chairman
- Amb. Theodore Sedgwick, Vice-chair
- June Langston DeHart, Vice-chair
- Randal Teague Sr., Secretary
- Margaret Biggs
- Garvin Brown, Treasurer
- Kenneth Cutshaw
- Charles Dolan Jr.
- Frank J. Donatelli
- Evelyn Farkas
- Jeffrey Feltman
- Hon. Irena Hadžiabdić
- Hon. Steny Hoyer
- Frederick S. Humphries Jr.
- William J. Hybl
- Attahiru Muhammadu Jega
- Gregori Lebedev
- M. Peter McPherson
- H.E. Andrés Pastrana
- Hon. Rob Portman
- Daniel F. Runde
- Donald R. Sweitzer
- Sarah Tinsley
- Margot Wallström

== Funding ==
IFES receives funding from these donors (among others) per its website:

U.S. Government

- United States Agency for International Development
- United States Department of State

Bilateral Donors

- AusAID (Australia)
- Global Affairs Canada (Canada)
- Department for International Development (United Kingdom)
- Finnish Ministry for Foreign Affairs
- Norwegian Royal Ministry of Foreign Affairs (Norway)
- SIDA (Sweden)

Multilateral Donors

- Organization for Security and Co-operation in Europe
- United Nations, UNDP, and other UN agencies

IFES partners with international and domestic organizations around the world to advance good governance and democratic rights.

== Activities by region ==
=== Sub-Saharan Africa ===
IFES has worked in over 20 countries in Sub-Saharan Africa over the past three decades. IFES has programs in Burkina Faso, Ethiopia, Kenya, Mali, Niger, Nigeria and Senegal. IFES lent significant support to the development of the Association of African Election Authorities.

=== The Americas ===
IFES has been developing and implementing programs in the Americas region since its foundation, in 1987. IFES has programs in Ecuador, El Salvador, Guatemala, Haiti, Honduras, Jamaica, and Nicaragua.

=== Asia-Pacific ===
Over the last three decades, IFES has engaged in programming and research across Asia-Pacific. IFES has programs in Bangladesh, Cambodia, Fiji, Indonesia, Maldives, Mekong Region, Myanmar, Nepal, Pacific Islands, Pakistan, Papua New Guinea, Sri Lanka and Timor-Leste.

=== Europe and Eurasia ===
Across Europe and Eurasia, IFES states that it applies its technical expertise in an effort to advance good governance and democratic rights. IFES has had a long-term presence in many countries in Europe, such as Ukraine–where IFES has regularly conducted public opinion surveys since 1994–and continues to conduct programming in diverse environments in countries such as Georgia and Kyrgyzstan.

As of 2023, IFES is active in Albania, Belarus, Bosnia and Herzegovina, Bulgaria, Kosovo, Montenegro, and Romania, with regional field offices in Armenia, Georgia, Kyrgyzstan, North Macedonia, Serbia, Ukraine, and Uzbekistan.

=== Middle East and North Africa ===
IFES has worked in over a dozen countries throughout the Middle East and North Africa. As of 2023, IFES runs activities in Lebanon and Syria, with regional field offices in Iraq, Libya, Sudan, and Tunisia.

== Bibliography ==
- Guy S. Goodwin-Gill (2006). Free and fair elections. Inter-parliamentary Union. ISBN 978-92-9142-277-7. Found at Google Books
- Kumar, Krishna (1998). Postconflict elections, democratization, and international assistance. Lynne Rienner Publishers. ISBN 978-1-55587-778-1. Found at Google books
- Lyons, Terrence (1998). Voting for peace: postconflict elections in Liberia. Brookings Institution Press. ISBN 978-0-8157-5353-7. Found at Google Books
- Marsden, Lee (2005). Lessons from Russia: Clinton and US democracy promotion. Ashgate Publishing, Ltd. ISBN 978-0-7546-4610-5. Found at Google Books
