= Hadle Rasmus Bjuland =

Norwegian politician

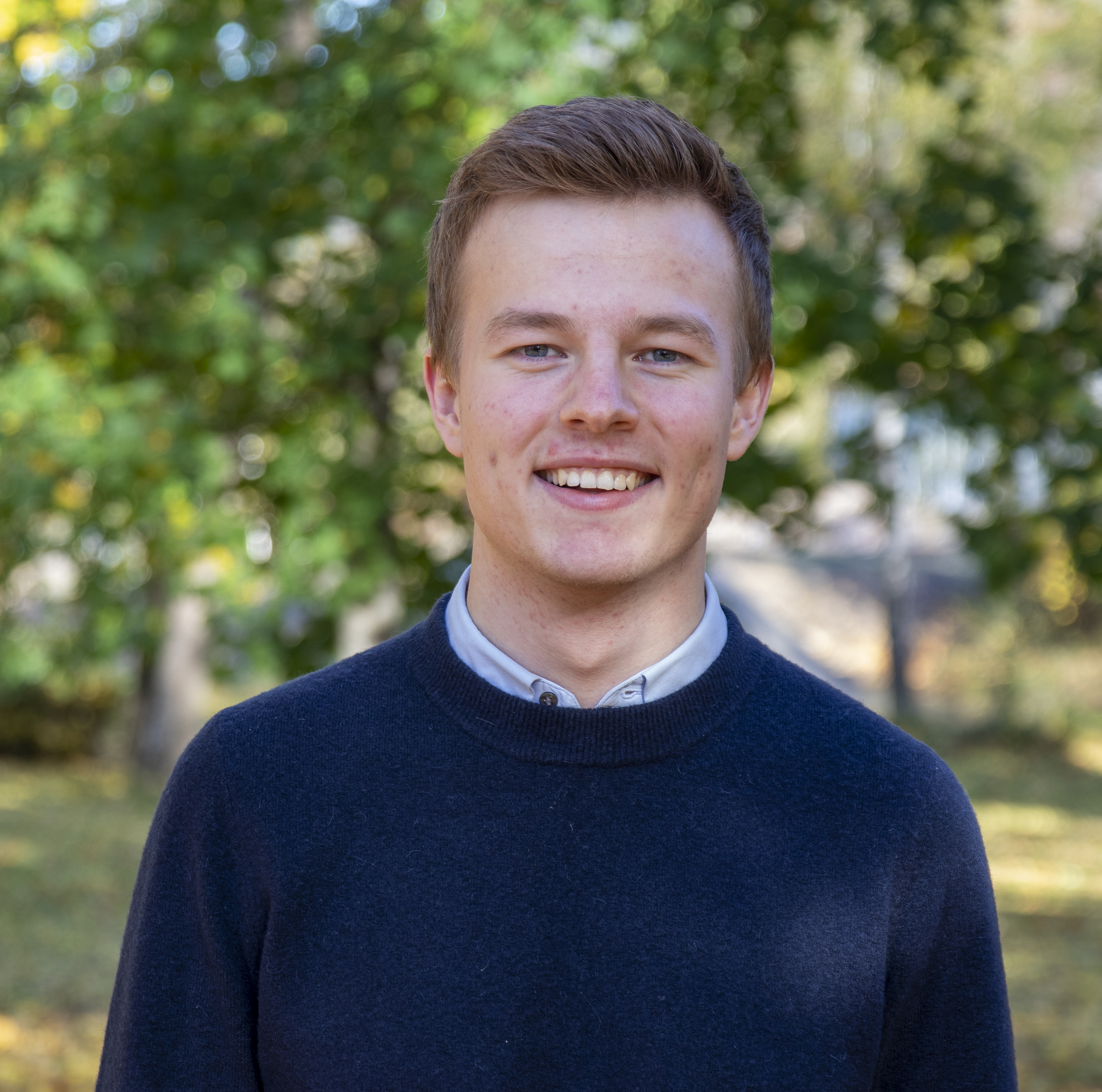

Deputy Member of the Storting
- Incumbent
- Assumed office 1 October 2021
- Deputising for: Olaug Bollestad (2021)
- Constituency: Rogaland

Leader of the Young Christian Democrats
- In office 16 October 2021 – 25 October 2025
- Deputy: Joel Ystebø; Edvard Kunzendorf; Erik Rønhovde
- Preceded by: Edel-Marie Haukland
- Succeeded by: Ingrid Olina Hovland

Personal details
- Born: 19 May 2000 (age 26) Nærbø, Rogaland, Norway
- Party: Christian Democratic
- Education: NLA University College

Hadle Rasmus Bjuland (born 19 May 2000) is a Norwegian politician from the Christian Democratic Party. He served as the leader of the Young Christian Democrats from 2021 to 2025 and has served as a deputy member of parliament from Rogaland since 2021.

== Political career ==
=== Youth politics ===
Bjuland served as the first deputy leader of the Young Christian Democrats between 2019 and 2021 under Edel-Marie Haukland's leadership. He also led the Vest and Aust-Agder Young Christian Democrats and was a political advisor to the Oslo Christian Democratic Party's city council group. He has also worked first as a trainee and then as a communications advisor to the Christian Democratic Party's parliamentary group. He succeeded Haukland as leader at the 2021 convention. He was re-elected in 2023. He announced in April 2025 that he wouldn't seek re-election at the next convention later the same year. He was succeeded by Ingrid Olina Hovland at the convention in October.

=== Party politics ===
A few weeks following Olaug Bollestad's departure as party leader in August 2024, Bjuland expressed that he would be open to becoming deputy leader under a new party leadership. He also outlined how the party could improve their polling numbers ahead of the 2025 parliamentary election. In November however, he ruled himself out of the running for a leadership position.

In October 2025, he was appointed as acting press secretary for his party in the Storting during Astrid-Therese Theisen's parental leave.

=== Parliament ===
He was elected as a deputy member to the Storting from Rogaland at the 2021 election. He was re-elected in 2025. He deputised for Olaug Bollestad between 1 and 14 October 2021 while she served as minister in the outgoing Solberg cabinet.

== Political positions ==
=== Drug use and young people ===
Bjuland has stated that the Christian Democrats ought to be against liberalising drugs. Furthermore, he claimed that the police have enough resources to combat the issue, but that the approach to it should be tougher. He suggested that the police could utilise police dogs in school yards and utilise other resources, such as testing youths for drugs in early stages so that they can be followed up properly and not be left outside of society.

=== Coalition partners ===
He has expressed that the Christian Democrats can work with the Progress Party in government. Furthermore, he has suggested that it would be ideal for his party to work with the Conservatives and the Progress Party in government, but has also been open to other coalition options. The Progress Party has however ruled out working with the Christian Democrats in government for a second time.

However, two months ahead of the 2025 election, he endorsed the mother party leader Dag Inge Ulstein's stance that the Christian Democrats could govern with the Progress Party and ditch working with the Liberal Party. Bjuland further stated that he pictured his party governing with the Conservative Party, but called this unrealistic, and argued that the Progress Party would be a better coalition partner.

=== Gender identity ===
Bjuland has been critical of the LGBT organisation Norwegian Organisation for Sexual and Gender Diversity being allowed to be present in schools, teaching about gender identity. He has highlighted issues such as how they teach about a being born the wrong gender and utilising different pronouns. He has also expressed that this should be replaced by a better public option to teach the subject in schools.

== Personal life ==
Bjuland hails from Nærbø in Hå Municipality in Rogaland. He is one of seven siblings. Two of his brothers, Torkel and Olaus Bjuland, are also members of the Christian Democratic Party and has served as leader and county leader of the Rogaland Young Christian Democrats respectively.

Party political offices
Preceded by Edel-Marie Haukland	Leader of the Young Christian Democrats; 2021–2025	Succeeded by Ingrid Olina Hovland
Preceded by Nikolai Berglund Skogan	First Deputy Leader of the Young Christian Democrats; 2019–2021	Succeeded by Joel Ystebø
