= Jorunn Gleditsch Lossius =

Norwegian politician

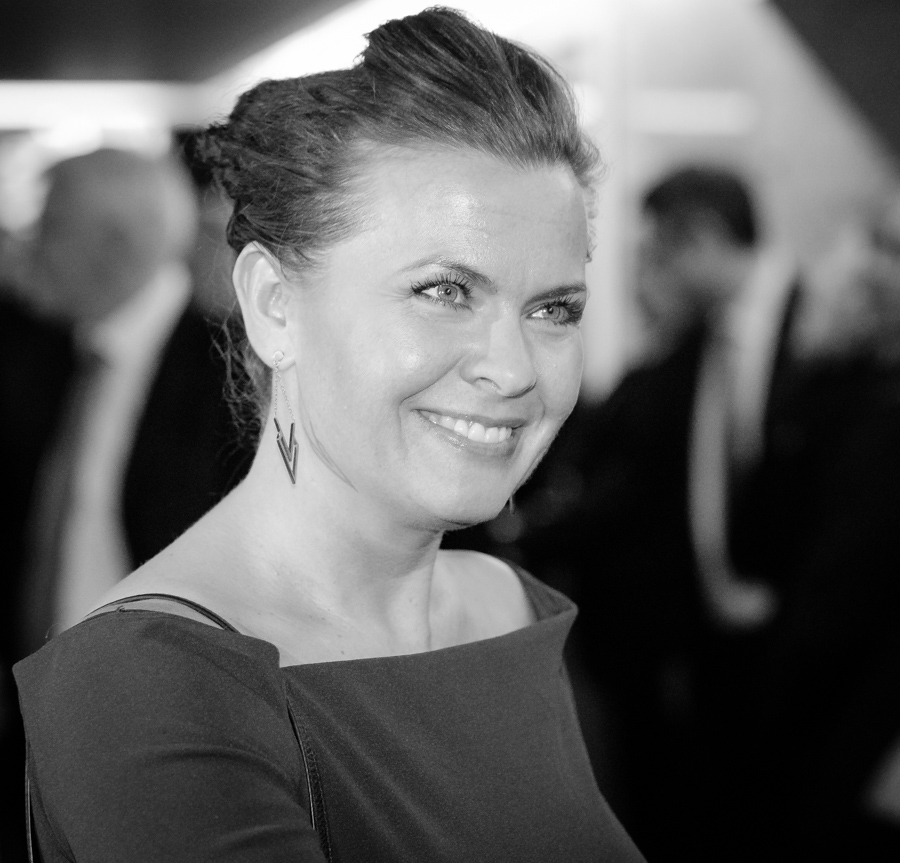
- Lossius in 2018

Second Deputy Leader of the Christian Democratic Party
- Incumbent
- Assumed office 25 January 2025
- Leader: Dag Inge Ulstein
- Preceded by: Ida Lindtveit Røse

Member of the Storting
- Incumbent
- Assumed office 1 October 2025
- Constituency: Vest-Agder

Deputy County Mayor of Agder
- In office 10 October 2023 – 21 October 2025
- Mayor: Arne Thomassen (H)
- Preceded by: Bjørn Ropstad (KrF)
- Succeeded by: Rune André Sørtveit Frustøl (KrF)

Deputy Member of the Storting
- In office 1 October 2021 – 30 September 2025
- Constituency: Vest-Agder
- In office 1 October 2017 – 30 September 2021
- Deputising for: Kjell Ingolf Ropstad (2019–2021)
- Constituency: Aust-Agder

Deputy Mayor of Lillesand Municipality
- In office 15 October 2015 – 17 October 2019
- Mayor: Arne Thomassen (H)
- Preceded by: Hege Marie Holthe
- Succeeded by: Geir Svenningsen

Personal details
- Born: 29 February 1980 (age 46) Orkdal Municipality, Sør-Trøndelag, Norway
- Party: Christian Democratic

Jorunn Elisabet Gleditsch Lossius (born 29 February 1980) is a Norwegian politician for the Christian Democratic Party (KrF), whom since 2025 has been a member of the Storting for Vest-Agder.

== Education ==
Lossius has studied Christianity, drama/theater, and history at the University of Agder.

== Political career ==
=== Parliament ===
She served as a deputy representative to the Parliament of Norway from Aust-Agder during the term 2017–2021. She deputised for Kjell Ingolf Ropstad while he served as minister in Solberg's Cabinet between 2019 and 2021. She was elected deputy member for Vest-Agder in the 2021 election and was elected regular member for Vest-Agder in the 2025 election.

She caused a media stir in April 2021, after posting a picture on Facebook of her pregnant belly, which was a reaction to the Socialist Left Party's decision to extend the limit for self-determined abortion from the current Norwegian law which allows 12 weeks, to 22 weeks.

=== Party politics ===
Lossius was a candidate for first deputy leader of the party ahead of the 2023 convention that April, but lost with 56 votes against Ida Lindtveit Røse's 98.

In the aftermath of Olaug Bollestad's resignation in August 2024, the party's election committee officially designated her as second deputy leader in December, with Dag Inge Ulstein as leader and Ida Lindtveit Røse as first deputy leader. The trio were formally elected at the extraordinary party convention on 25 January 2025.

=== Local politics ===
She served as deputy mayor of Lillesand Municipality between 2015 and 2019. She took over from the Conservatives' Hege Marie Holthe and was later succeeded by fellow party member Geir Svenningsen.

Following the 2023 local elections, she was elected deputy county mayor, with the Conservative Party's Arne Thomassen as county mayor.
