= Ida Lindtveit Røse =

Norwegian politician (born 1992)

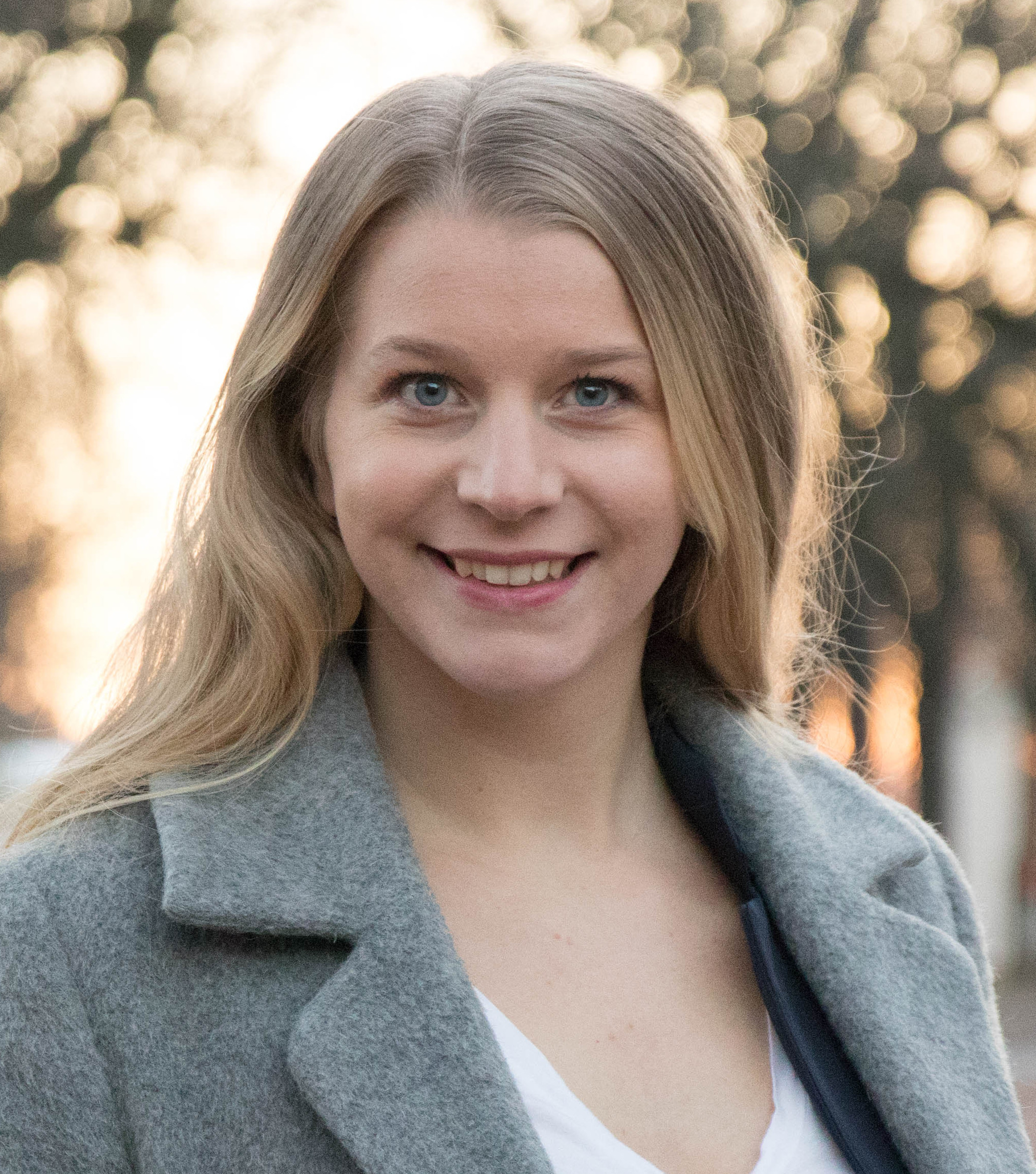
- Røse in 2020

Akershus County Commissioner for Enterprise, Public Health, Sports and Diversity
- In office 17 October 2023 – 1 October 2025
- Cabinet Chair: Anette Solli
- Preceded by: Position established
- Succeeded by: Lars Salvesen

First Deputy Leader of the Christian Democratic Party
- Incumbent
- Assumed office 25 January 2025
- Leader: Dag Inge Ulstein
- Preceded by: Dag Inge Ulstein

Second Deputy Leader of the Christian Democratic Party
- In office 22 April 2023 – 25 January 2025
- Leader: Olaug Bollestad; Dag Inge Ulstein (acting)
- Preceded by: Ingelin Noresjø
- Succeeded by: Jorunn Gleditsch Lossius

Member of the Storting
- Incumbent
- Assumed office 1 October 2025
- Constituency: Akershus

Personal details
- Born: 3 December 1992 (age 33) Oppegård, Akershus, Norway
- Party: Christian Democratic
- Spouse: John Anders Lindtveit Røse
- Children: 3

Ida Lindtveit Røse (born 3 December 1992) is a Norwegian politician for the Christian Democratic Party. She is currently serving as the party's first deputy leader and a member of the Storting for Akershus since 2025. She previously served as the Akershus county commissioner of enterprise, public health, sports and diversity from 2023 to 2025 and second deputy leader from 2023 to 2025. She furthermore served as the leader of the Young Christian Democrats between 2015 and 2017.

== Background ==
Hailing from Oppegård, she graduated from the University of Oslo with a bachelor's degree in European studies in 2014 and a master's degree in political science.

== Political career ==
=== Youth politics ===
She was active in JEF Norway and the Young Christian Democrats, leading the latter's Akershus branch from 2011 to 2012. In 2012, she became a central board member of the Young Christian Democrats, advancing to deputy leader in 2013 and leader from 2015 to 2017.

=== Local politics ===
Røse was elected to Viken county council in 2019, leading the Christian Democratic Party caucus. Following the 2023 Norwegian local elections, the Christian Democratic Party managed to form a county cabinet together with its coalition partners, the Conservatives, Progress and the Liberals, led by Anette Solli. The county cabinet would preside over Akershus County Municipality, following the dissolution of Viken on 1 January 2024. Røse was appointed county commissioner of enterprise, public health, sports and diversity. She was replaced by Lars Salvesen after being elected to the Storting at the 2025 parliamentary election.

=== Acting Minister of Children and Families ===
From 1 June to 21 August 2020, Røse served as the acting Minister of Children and Families, filling in for Kjell Ingolf Ropstad who was on parental leave. At the age of 27, Røse became the youngest ever government minister in Norway.

=== Party politics ===
She was elected as the Christian Democrats's second deputy leader at the party's 2023 party convention.

In the aftermath of Olaug Bollestad's resignation in August 2024, the party's election committee officially designated her as first deputy leader in December, with Dag Inge Ulstein as leader and Jorunn Gleditsch Lossius as second deputy leader. The trio were formally elected at the extraordinary party convention on 25 January 2025.

=== Parliament ===
She was elected as a regular member to the Storting from Akershus at the 2025 election. She additionally became the party's parliamentary leader.

== Civic career ==
Røse was a trainee in NHO Service in 2012 and the Christian Democratic Party in 2013, before being hired as an adviser on education and asylum rights in the Christian Democratic Party in 2014. After her stint as Young Christian Democrats leader, she temporarily left national politics to work as an adviser in Abelia from 2017 and First House from 2019.

== Personal life ==
Røse is married to John Anders Lindtveit Røse and has three children.

Party political offices
Preceded by Emil André Erstad	Leader of the Young Christian Democrats; 2015–2017	Succeeded by Martine Tønnessen
Preceded by Ingelin Noresjø	Second Deputy Leader of the Christian Democratic Party; 2023–2025	Succeeded by Jorunn Gleditsch Lossius
Preceded by Dag Inge Ulstein	First Deputy Leader of the Christian Democratic Party; 2025–present	Incumbent
Political offices
New office	Akershus County Commissioner of Enterprise, Public Health, Sports and Diversity; 2023–2025	Succeeded by Lars Salvesen
