= Olaug Bollestad =

Norwegian nurse and politician

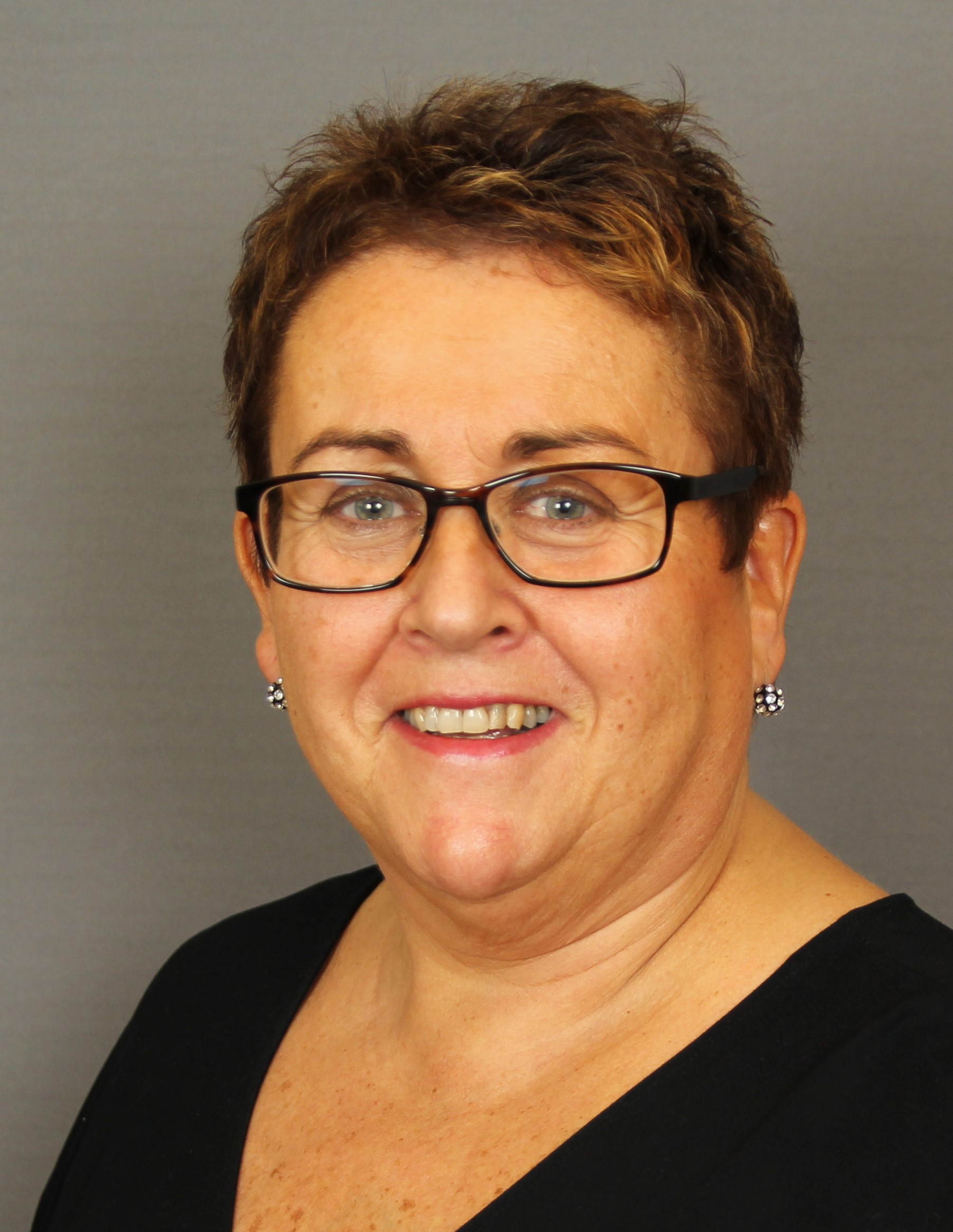

Minister of Agriculture and Food
- In office 22 January 2019 – 14 October 2021
- Prime Minister: Erna Solberg
- Preceded by: Bård Hoksrud
- Succeeded by: Sandra Borch

Minister of Children, Family and Church Affairs
- In office 20 September 2021 – 14 October 2021
- Prime Minister: Erna Solberg
- Preceded by: Kjell Ingolf Ropstad
- Succeeded by: Kjersti Toppe

First Deputy Leader of the Christian Democratic Party
- In office 29 April 2017 – 13 November 2021
- Leader: Knut Arild Hareide; Kjell Ingolf Ropstad
- Preceded by: Dagrun Eriksen
- Succeeded by: Dag Inge Ulstein

Second Deputy Leader of the Christian Democratic Party
- In office 9 May 2015 – 29 April 2017
- Leader: Knut Arild Hareide
- Succeeded by: Kjell Ingolf Ropstad

Leader of the Christian Democratic Party
- In office 13 November 2021 – 22 August 2024; Acting: 24 September – 13 November 2021
- First Deputy: Dag Inge Ulstein
- Second Deputy: Ingelin Noresjø; Ida Lindtveit Røse
- Preceded by: Kjell Ingolf Ropstad
- Succeeded by: Dag Inge Ulstein
- Acting; 17 January 2019 – 27 April 2019
- Preceded by: Knut Arild Hareide
- Succeeded by: Kjell Ingolf Ropstad

Member of the Storting
- In office 1 October 2013 – 30 September 2025
- Deputy: Geir Sigbjørn Toskedal; Hadle Rasmus Bjuland
- Constituency: Rogaland

Mayor of Gjesdal Municipality
- In office 22 October 2007 – 23 September 2013
- Deputy: Torill Idland; Frode Fjeldsbø
- Preceded by: Karl Edvard Aksnes
- Succeeded by: Frode Fjeldsbø

Personal details
- Born: 4 November 1961 (age 64) Strand Municipality, Rogaland, Norway
- Party: Christian Democratic
- Spouse: Jan Frode Bollestad (m. 1986)

Olaug Vervik Bollestad (born 4 November 1961) is a Norwegian nurse and politician for the Christian Democratic Party. She was a member of Parliament for Rogaland from 2013 to 2025 and served as the party leader between 2021 and 2024, having been deputy leader from 2015 to 2021. She also served as Minister of Agriculture and Food from 2019 to 2021.

== Political career ==
=== Early career ===
Educated as a nurse, she worked as department manager at Stavanger University Hospital before she became mayor. She was elected to the municipal council of Gjesdal Municipality in 2003.

=== Mayor of Gjesdal ===
She served as mayor of Gjesdal Municipality from 2007 to 2013, when she was elected to the Parliament of Norway in the 2013 Norwegian parliamentary election where she was nominated in the first spot on the Christian Democratic Party's ballot for Rogaland. During her tenure, the Centre Party's Torill Idland served as deputy mayor from 2007 to 2011 and Labour's Frode Fjeldsbø from 2011 to 2013. Bollestad resigned on 23 September 2013 to take her seat in parliament and was succeeded by Fjeldsbø.

During her first tenure as mayor, she led a coalition with the Labour Party, Centre Party and Socialist Left Party. The Socialist Left Party dropped out of the coalition following the 2011 local elections, but Bollestad continued to lead a coalition with the Labour and Centre parties. Following her resignation to take her seat in Parliament, she was said to have been "disappointed" with the Labour Party taking over the mayorship in Gjesdal.

=== Parliament ===
Bollestad was elected as a deputy representative to the Storting from Rogaland following the 2009 election and held the position until 2013. At the 2013 election, she was elected as a regular representative from Rogaland and was re-elected in 2017 and 2021. She announced in September 2024 that she wouldn't seek re-election at the 2025 election.

In parliament, she sat on the Standing Committee on Health and Care Services between 2013 and 2019, leading it between 2017 and 2019. She later rejoined the committee following the 2021 election. She was also a member of the Enlarged Committee on Foreign Affairs and Defence between 2021 and 2024.

While she served in government between 2019 and 2021, Geir Sigbjørn Toskedal deputised for her, and then Hadle Rasmus Bjuland deputised for her in the last 13 days of the Solberg government's tenure.

=== Party deputy leader ===
At the party convention in May 2015, she was elected the second deputy leader of the party and later first deputy leader at the 2017 convention.

In September to November 2018, during the Christian Democratic path choice between a Labour or Conservative led cabinet choice, Bollestad co-led the faction who favoured to enter the Solberg cabinet, alongside Kjell Ingolf Ropstad. It was widely unexpected that she would go against party leader Knut Arild Hareide's advice. The Solberg favouring faction ended up winning the most votes at the party special convention on 2 November 2018.

After Hareide's resignation on 17 January 2019, Bollestad took over as acting leader until the party elected Kjell Ingolf Ropstad as Hareide's successor at the party convention on 27 April.

Following Ropstad's resignation on 18 September 2021, the party central board announced that he would step down on 24 September and Bollestad would become acting leader.

In October 2021, Bollestad presented her candidacy for party leader. Her only other liable opponent for the position, Dag Inge Ulstein, withdrew, thereby making Bollestad the presumptive new leader to succeed Kjell Ingolf Ropstad.

The Christian Democratic election committee designated Bollestad as the new party leader on 1 November.

=== Minister of Agriculture and Food ===
Following the party's negotiations to enter the Solberg cabinet, she was appointed minister of agriculture and food on 22 January 2019.

==== 2019 ====
On 16 May, she presented the state's offer for the agricultural settlement of 1,24 trillion kroner. Bollestad described the negotiations as "challenging", but that her ministry, the Norwegian Agrarian Association and the Norwegian Farmers and Smallholders Union had reached "a good agreement".

In May, Bollestad accepted the resignation of Harald Gjein, the director of the Norwegian Food Safety Authority following revelations that the Authority had conducted a supervisory case against a fur farmer in Rogaland, where they had prepared an incorrect report. Bollestad said she had taken his resignation into consideration and thanked him for his service. She further said that: "We depend on the Food Safety Authority having a good reputation, that it has the trust of farmers, food producers, us consumers and the public sector". The Centre Party's Geir Pollestad, called on Bollestad to give an explanation to the Storting about the situation.

In July, Bollestad stated that the farmers feel the impact of climate change on the bottom line. She further said: "It is very important that we are as self-sufficient as possible, and the differences between the grain crops last year and this year show how weather dependent we are. The crops are not only about politics, but also about Our Lord giving us good weather".

==== 2020 ====
She expressed frustration over local politicians who wanted to downsize agricultural land. To Aftenposten in July 2020, she said: "It is important for municipal politicians that they do not demolish the cultivated land. If we are to increase the self-sufficiency of vegetables, they must not do so".

In November, following concerns expressed by Socialist Left's Arne Nævra that Norway also should kill minks like Denmark, Bollestad responded by saying that the situation was completely under control, and added that Norway had fewer minks then Denmark, also spread over farms in a different way.

In December, after getting her hunting license, Bollestad visited the Norwegian Association of Hunters and Anglers in Drøbak to mark their 150th anniversary. She also joined them to hunt deer.

==== 2021 ====
In January 2021, Bollestad reassured that there were sufficient amount of food and no shortage of it after hearing people continued to hoard shops. She said that: "If we start emptying the shelves, there will be a larger movement of people. If we can keep our ears open, we will distribute this to everyone". She went on to add that people should rest assured that there are large storages of food, and that shops and pharmacies upheld their normal opening hours.

At a press conference following Kjell Ingolf Ropstad's announced resignation on 18 September 2021, Erna Solberg said that Bollestad would be appointed to succeed him on 20 September.

Following the government's defeat at the 2021 parliamentary election, Bollestad was succeeded by Sandra Borch as minister of agriculture and food, and Kjersti Toppe as minister of children and families.

=== Party leader ===
Bollestad was formally elected party leader at the party convention on 13 November, with Ulstein as first deputy and Ingelin Noresjø continuing as second deputy. She and Ulstein were re-elected at the 2023 party convention, with Ida Lindtveit Røse joining as second deputy leader.

On 7 December, following the government's announcement of new COVID-19 measures, Bollestad emphasised that she understood that people were confused, saying: "I understand well if the population is confused by this. Last week, the government said we should go to julebord. Now there is a limit of 10 pieces at home. Are we now seeing the results of an unprepared government coming too late?" She went on to say: "It is good that there are measures now, but there should have been measures earlier so that we could have avoided such intrusive measures".

In May 2022, she caused controversy when she proposed in an internal letter that the party's organisation should be centralised in order to become more appealing in future elections. Her proposal included centralising the party's respective county leaders and for it to be replaced by a singular "organisation leader" in Oslo, together with 11-13 "organisation developers". Several county chapters viewed the proposed plan negatively, noting that the party would lose touch with locals and municipalities without a local chapter.

In August, after the opposition gained a majority to order the government to find solutions to the electricity costs, Bollestad called for a halt to export of electricity, saying: "This has gone way too far. The Christian Democrats wants exports to stop until we have filled up the water reservoirs to a safe level. Now we must do what we can to prevent the electricity bill from reaching new records this winter".

At the party convention in 2023, Bollestad encouraged prime minister Jonas Gahr Støre to replace health minister Ingvild Kjerkol, noting that Kjerkol had not done a good job in dealing with issues within the health services.

Bollestad was on leave since early June 2024, which was later extended to 31 August. On 14 August, media revealed that she had received a formal complaint from staffers in the party's parliamentary group regarding her leadership and behaviour. Days prior, she allegedly also accused her deputy leaders and the party secretary of wanting to oust her, something the trio denied. The party held an internal extraordinary meeting on 22 August, and in the late hours of the same day, Bollestad announced that she would resign as leader. First deputy leader Dag Inge Ulstein took over as acting leader. He took over on a permanent basis at the party's extraordinary convention on 25 January 2025.

== Personal life ==
She married Jan Frode Bollestad in 1986. She is also a member of the Norwegian Baptist Union.
