= Ingelin Noresjø =

Norwegian politician

Second Deputy Leader of the Christian Democratic Party
- In office 27 April 2019 – 8 February 2022
- Leader: Kjell Ingolf Ropstad; Olaug Bollestad
- Preceded by: Kjell Ingolf Ropstad
- Succeeded by: Ida Lindtveit Røse

State Secretary for the Ministry of Transport and Communications
- In office 24 January 2020 – 14 October 2021
- Prime Minister: Erna Solberg
- Minister: Knut Arild Hareide

Nordland County Commissioner for Trade and Planning
- In office 15 September 2017 – 24 January 2020
- Cabinet Chair: Tomas Norvoll
- Preceded by: Mona Fagerås
- Succeeded by: Linda Hélen Haukland

Nordland County Commissioner for Culture, Environment and Public Health
- In office 29 April 2015 – 15 September 2017
- Cabinet Chair: Tomas Norvoll
- Preceded by: Beate Bø Nilsen
- Succeeded by: Aase Refsnes

Personal details
- Born: 21 March 1976 (age 50)
- Party: Christian Democratic
- Children: 3
- Education: Bodø University College; University of Western Australia

Ingelin Noresjø (born 21 March 1976) is a Norwegian politician for the Christian Democratic Party. She served as a Nordland County Commissioner between 2015 and 2020 and second deputy leader of her party between 2019 and 2022.

== Early life and education ==
She hails from Fauske Municipality and took her education at Bodø University College and the University of Western Australia.

== Political career ==
In 2011, she entered politics, being elected member of the municipal council of Fauske Municipality and Nordland county council. She progressed into the county government of Nordland where she served as a County Commissioner from 2015 to 2020. First, she served as County Commissioner for Culture, Environment and Public Health from April 2015 until 2017 and then for Trade and Planning until 2020.

She was then a State Secretary in the Ministry of Transport from 2020 to 2021, serving in Solberg's Cabinet.

In her party, Noresjø worked as county secretary from 2005 to 2011 and served as second deputy leader of the nationwide party from 2019. She resigned in February 2022 in order to become project leader for a green land transport program.

== Personal life ==
Noresjø is married to her husband Torbjørn, with whom she has three children.
