= Dag-Inge Ulstein =

Norwegian politician (born 1980)

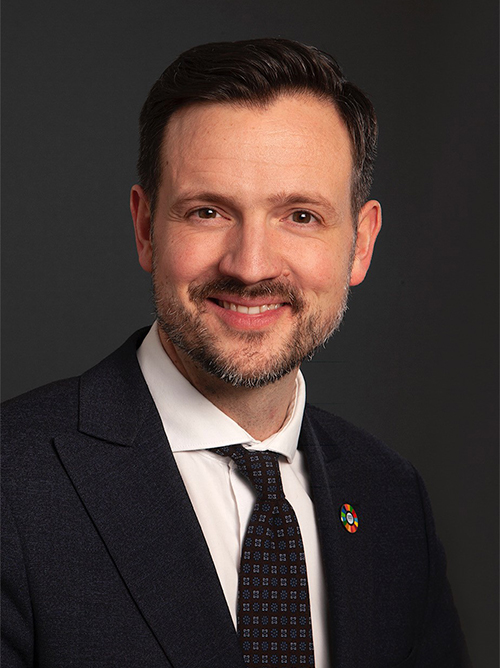
- Ulstein in 2021

Leader of the Christian Democratic Party
- Incumbent
- Assumed office 22 August 2024; Acting: 22 August 2024 – 25 January 2025
- First Deputy: Ida Lindtveit Røse
- Second Deputy: Jorunn Gleditsch Lossius
- Preceded by: Olaug Bollestad

First Deputy Leader of the Christian Democratic Party
- In office 13 November 2021 – 22 August 2024
- Leader: Olaug Bollestad
- Preceded by: Olaug Bollestad
- Succeeded by: Ida Lindtveit Røse

Member of the Norwegian Parliament
- In office 1 October 2021 – 30 September 2025
- Deputy: Astrid Aarhus Byrknes (2021)
- Constituency: Hordaland

Minister of International Development
- In office 22 January 2019 – 14 October 2021
- Prime Minister: Erna Solberg
- Preceded by: Nikolai Astrup
- Succeeded by: Anne Beathe Tvinnereim

Bergen City Commissioner for Finance
- In office 22 October 2015 – 22 November 2018
- Chief Commissioner: Harald Schjelderup
- Preceded by: Eiler Macody Lund
- Succeeded by: Håkon Pettersen

Bergen City Commissioner for Social, Housing and Area Investment
- In office 26 June 2013 – 17 June 2014
- Chief Commissioner: Monica Mæland; Ragnhild Stolt-Nielsen
- Preceded by: Lisbeth Iversen
- Succeeded by: Eiler Macody Lund

Personal details
- Born: 4 December 1980 (age 45) Sula Municipality, Norway
- Party: Christian Democratic
- Spouse: Ingjerd Mella Ulstein
- Children: 4
- Occupation: Politician; Vocalist; Sexologist

Dag-Inge Ulstein (born 4 December 1980) is a Norwegian politician who has led the Christian Democratic Party since 2024. He previously served as its deputy leader from 2021 to 2024.

Ulstein was appointed Minister of International Development in Solberg's Cabinet on 22 January 2019, a position which he held until the cabinet resigned following the 2021 election.

== Political career ==
=== Local politics ===
Ulstein served as Bergen's city commissioner for social, housing and area investment from 2013 to 2014, when his party withdrew from the council cabinet, citing disagreements over a proposed route for the light rail to Åsane. When Harald Schjelderup became chief commissioner following the 2015 local elections, Ulstein was appointed city commissioner for finance. He held the post until he stepped down in 2018.

=== Parliament ===
Having been a deputy to the Storting for the Christian Democratic Party from Hordaland from 2017 to 2021, Ulstein was elected representative to the Storting for the period 2021–2025. In the Storting, he was a member of the Standing Committee on Foreign Affairs and Defence from 2021.

In June 2024, he announced that he wouldn't be seeking re-election at the 2025 election.

=== Minister of International Development ===
Following his party's negotiations to enter the Solberg cabinet, Ulstein was appointed minister of international development on 22 January 2019. This was despite the fact that he had supported the Labour favouring faction of the party in the path choice the year before.

=== Other ===
Ulstein is leading WHO's ACT-A Initiative (Access to Covid-19 Tools Accelerator). ACT-A is set up to lead the efforts to mobilize political and financial support to ensure equitable distribution of corona virus vaccines, medicines and tests. He is also a Board Member of the Global Center on Adaptation to address climate change.

He has previously held the position as head of development at Haraldsplass Diaconal Foundation, a specialised hospital. Prior to this position he was the general manager at Haraldsplass therapy and counselling center (2012–2014).

Ulstein was considered one of the most leading candidates to replace Kjell Ingolf Ropstad as party leader after the resigned following a parliamentary housing scandal. Ulstein never confirmed his candidacy, but still pulled himself out of consideration in October 2021, thereby leading to Olaug Bollestad being the presumptive new party leader. He was however open to become deputy leader.

=== Party deputy leader ===
Ulstein was designated as first deputy leader along with Bollestad as leader. At the party convention on 13 November, he won with 149 votes against Truls Olufsen-Mehus' 11. He was re-elected at the 2023 convention alongside Bollestad, with Ida Lindtveit Røse joining as second deputy leader.

He became acting party leader following Bollestad's resignation following a formal complaint made against her by parliamentary staffers over her leadership style and behaviour. He was floated as a possible successor to Bollestad, which he initially declined to be considered before later reversing his decision in September. The party's election committee officially designated him as leader in December, with Ida Lindtveit Røse as first deputy and Jorunn Gleditsch Lossius as second deputy leader.

=== Party leader ===
Ulstein, Røse and Lossius were formally elected at the extraordinary party convention on 25 January 2025.

== Civic career ==
Ulstein was a vocalist in the Norwegian Christian pop-group Elevate.

He would later serve as the vocalist for the electronica band Electric City.

== Other activities ==
- Asian Infrastructure Investment Bank (AIIB), Ex-Officio Member of the Board of Governors (since 2019)
- Multilateral Investment Guarantee Agency (MIGA), World Bank Group, Ex-Officio Member of the Board of Governors (since 2019)
- World Bank, Ex-Officio Member of the Board of Governors (since 2019)

== Personal life ==
Ulstein is originally from Sula Municipality and moved to Bergen in 2001. He is married to Ingjerd Mella, with whom he has four children.

Political offices
Preceded by Lisbeth Iversen	Bergen City Commissioner for Social Affairs, Housing and Area Investment; 2013–2014	Succeeded by Eiler Macody Lund
Preceded by Eiler Macody Lund	Bergen City Commissioner for Finance; 2015–2018	Succeeded by Håkon Pettersen
Preceded by Nikolai Astrup	Minister of International Development; 2019–2021	Succeeded by Anne Beathe Tvinnereim
Party political offices
Preceded by Olaug Bollestad	First Deputy Leader of the Christian Democratic Party; 2021–2024	Succeeded by Ida Lindtveit Røse
Preceded by Olaug Bollestad	Leader of the Christian Democratic Party; 2024–present Acting: 2024–2025	Incumbent
