= Mona Fagerås =

Norwegian politician

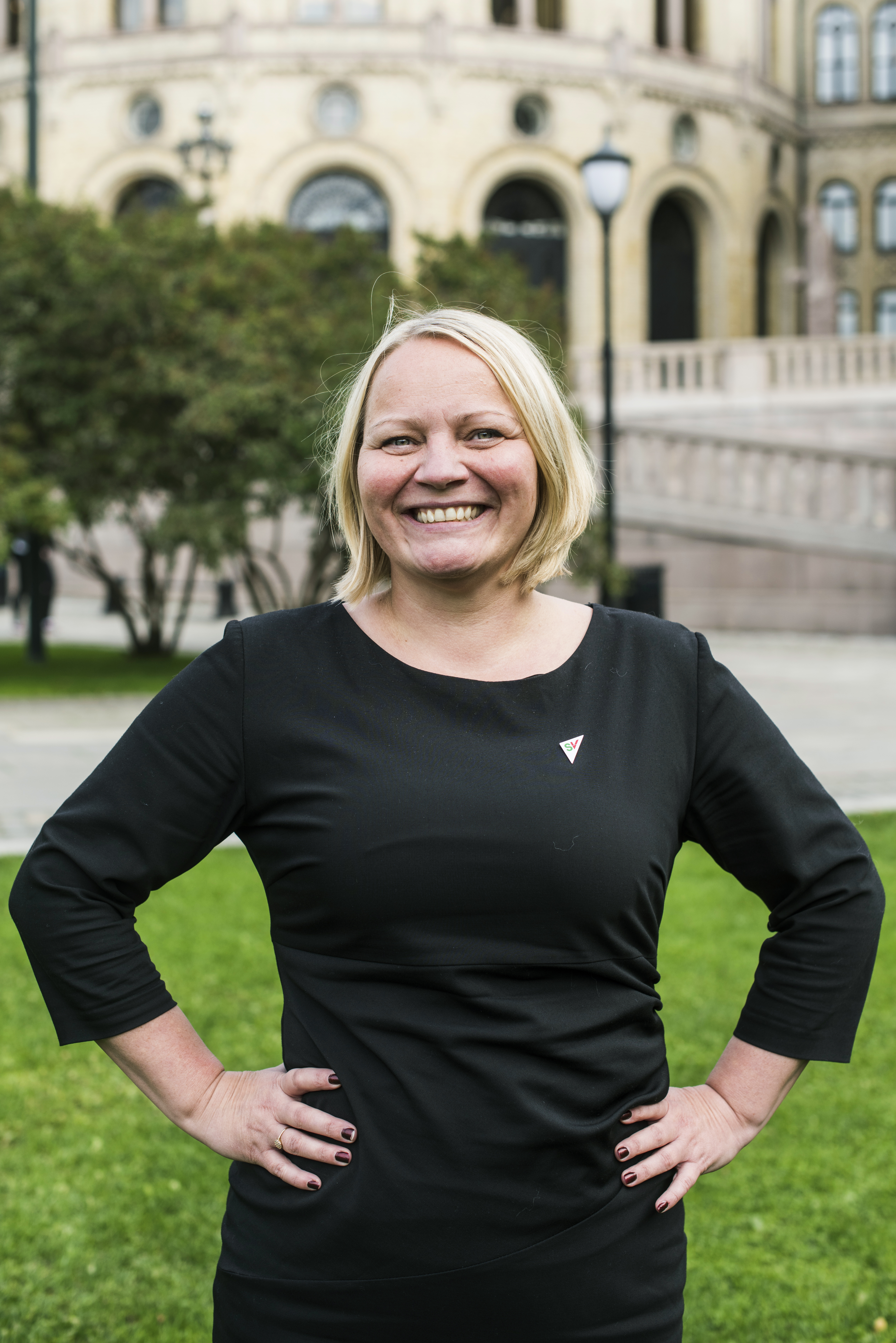

Member of the Storting
- In office 1 October 2017 – 30 September 2025
- Constituency: Nordland

Nordland County Commissioner for Trade
- In office 18 September 2015 – 15 September 2017
- Cabinet Chair: Tomas Norvoll
- Preceded by: Arve Knudsen
- Succeeded by: Ingelin Noresjø

Personal details
- Born: 9 January 1972 (age 54) Harstad Municipality, Troms, Norway
- Party: Socialist Left
- Children: 2
- Education: University of Tromsø
- Occupation: Teacher; Politician

Mona Lill Fagerås (born 9 January 1972) is a Norwegian teacher and politician. A member of the Socialist Left Party, she served as a member of the Storting for Nordland from 2017 to 2025 and previously served as the Nordland County Commissioner for Trade from 2015 to 2017.

== Political career ==
=== Local politics ===
She was a member of the Vestvågøy Municipal Council between 2003 and 2011 and the Vestvågøy formannskap between 2011 and 2015. She also served as the deputy leader of the Nordland Socialist Left Party from 2014 to 2016.

Fagerås served as the Nordland County Commissioner for Trade in Tomas Norvoll's county cabinet between 2015 and 2017, when she resigned after winning a seat at the 2017 parliamentary election.

=== Parliament ===
Fagerås was elected as a regular representative to the Storting from Nordland at the 2017 election and won re-election in 2021. She announced in May 2024 that she wouldn't seek re-election at the 2025 election.

In parliament, she sat on the Election Committee from 2017 to 2018 and the Standing Committee on Education and Research from 2017 to 2021. She was also her party's deputy whip from 2019 to 2021. During her second term, she sat on the Preparatory Credentials Committee and the Standing Committee on Transport and Communications, while also serving as a deputy member to the Election Committee.

== Civic career ==
In her capacity as a teacher, Fagerås has worked at several elementary schools throughout her civilian career. These include Lindeberg in Oslo from 1995 to 1999, Leknes and Ballstad in Vestvågøy from 1999 to 2001 and 2002 to 2013 respectively, and Lamarka in Sortland Municipality from 2001 to 2002. She also served as the principal of Opdøl and Busknes elementary schools from 2012 to 2013 and 2014 to 2015 respectively.

In June 2025, she was hired as the municipal director for youth development in her municipality of residence, Vestvågøy.

== Personal life ==
Fagerås was previously married and divorced in 2013. She has two children from said relationship, one daughter and one son, whom she has raised as a single mother.
