= Geir Toskedal =

Norwegian politician

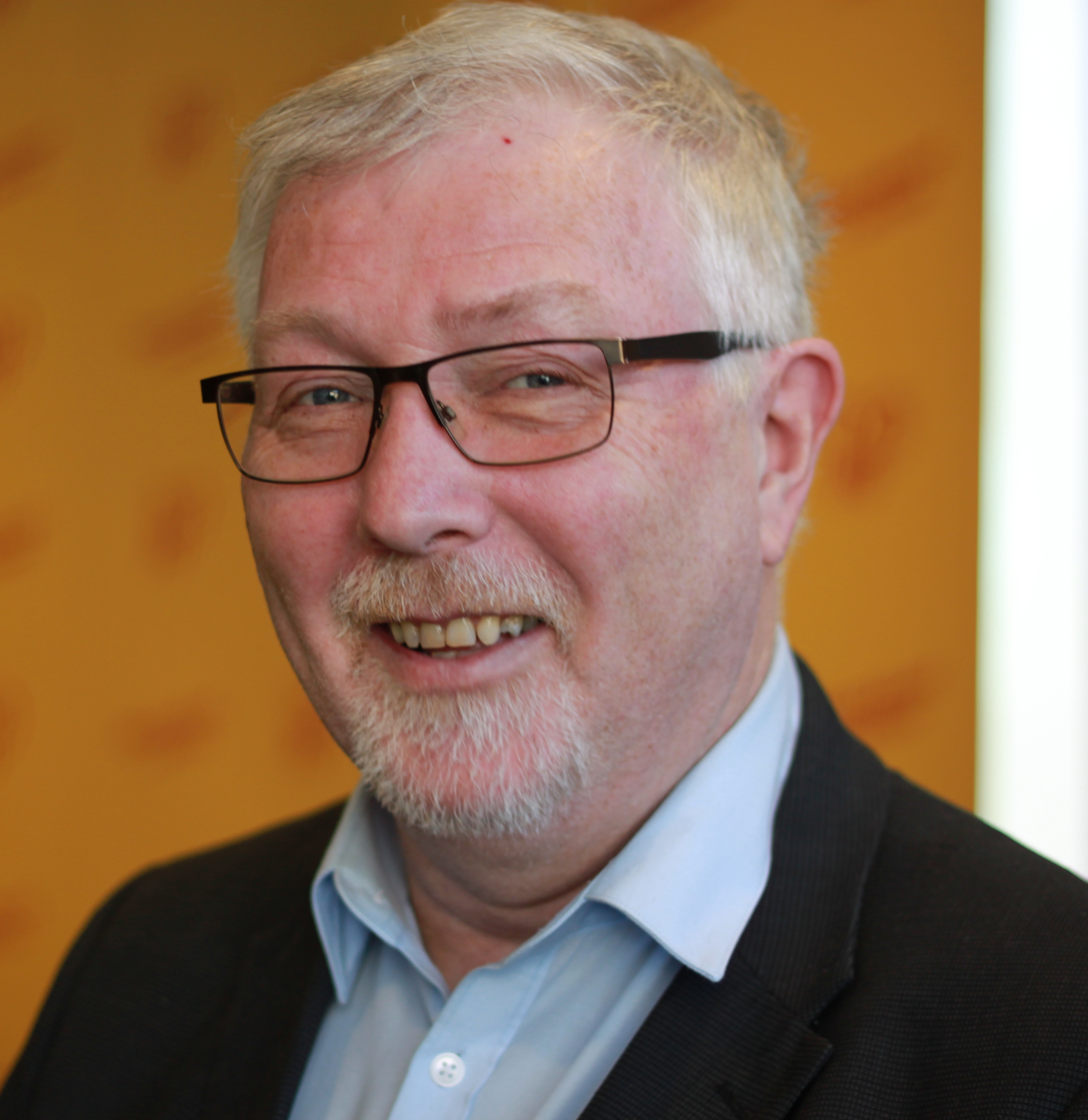
Geir S. Toskedal

Geir Sigbjørn Toskedal (born 27 April 1954) is a Norwegian politician for the Christian Democratic Party. He was elected to the Parliament of Norway from Rogaland in 2013 where he is a member of the Standing Committee on Local Government and Public Administration.

Toskedal has been elected to the municipal council of Karmøy Municipality six times and to the Rogaland county council in 2007 and 2011. He has been deputy leader of the Rogaland branch of the Christian Democratic Party.

He has mostly worked in the educational sector and was rector of Karmøy school of music and arts at the time he was elected to the parliament.
