= Arne Thomassen =

Norwegian politician

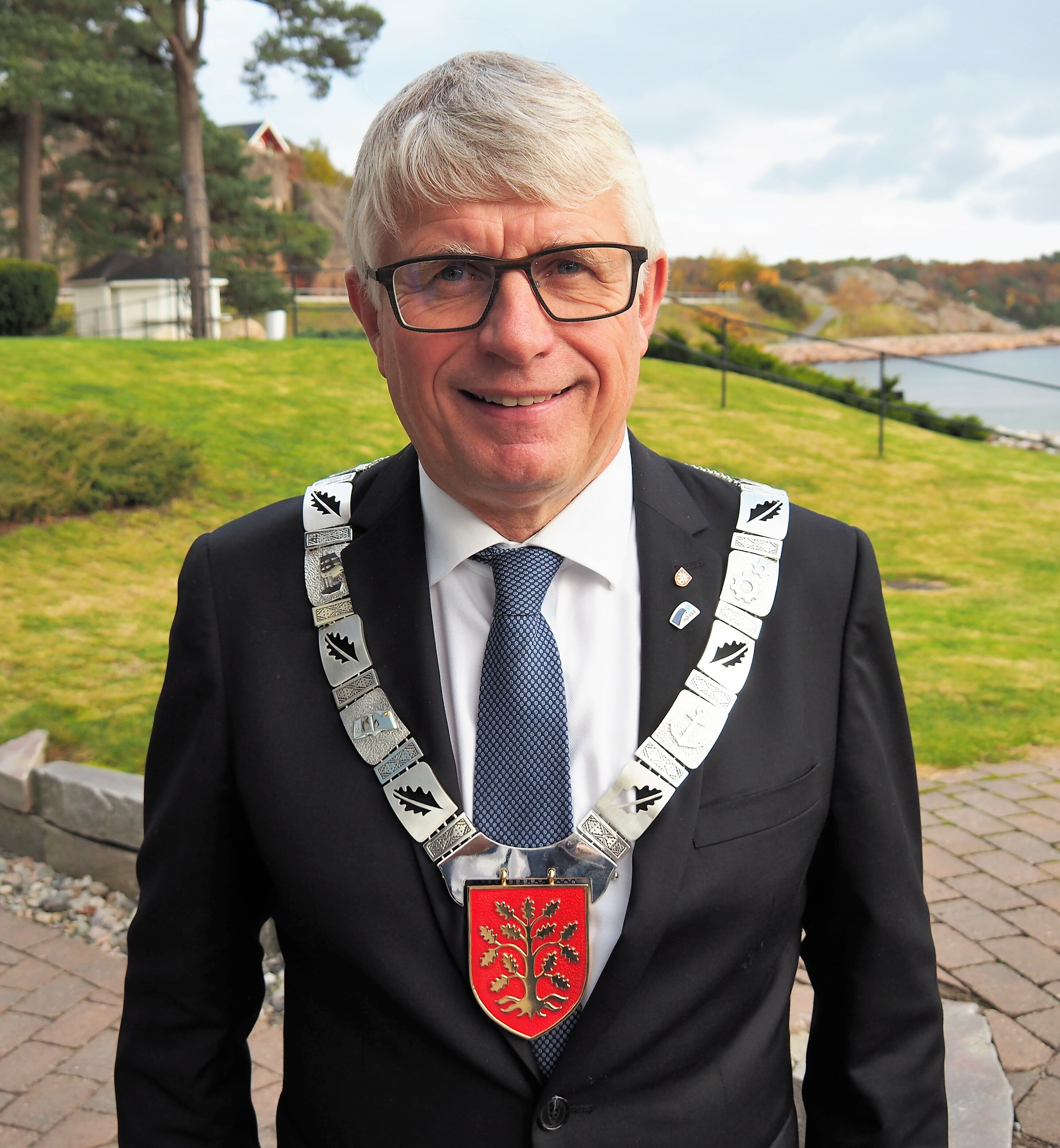

County Mayor of Agder
- Incumbent
- Assumed office 23 October 2019
- Deputy: Bjørn Ropstad; Jorunn Gleditsch Lossius; Rune André Sørtveit Frustøl
- Preceded by: Position established

Mayor of Lillesand Municipality
- In office October 2003 – 17 October 2019
- Deputy: Arve Danielsen; Tor Audun Danielsen; Hege Marie Holthe; Jorunn Gleditsch Lossius
- Preceded by: Odd Steinsdal
- Succeeded by: Einar Holmer-Hoven

Deputy Member of the Storting
- In office 1 October 2009 – 30 September 2021
- Constituency: Aust-Agder

Personal details
- Born: 13 February 1959 (age 67) Lillesand Municipality, Aust-Agder, Norway
- Party: Conservative
- Occupation: Plumber; Politician

Arne Thomassen (born 13 February 1959) is a Norwegian politician for the Conservative Party. He has served as county mayor of Agder since 2019. He previously served as mayor of Lillesand Municipality between 2003 and 2019 and a deputy member of parliament for Aust-Agder between 2009 and 2021.

== Political career ==
=== Parliament ===
He served as a deputy representative to the Storting from Aust-Agder between 2009 and 2021, having been re-elected in 2013 and 2017.

=== Local politics ===
He has been an elected member of Aust-Agder county council and served as the leader of Aust-Agder Conservative Party. He also served as mayor of Lillesand Municipality between 2003 and 2019, securing re-election in 2007, 2011 and 2015. He was succeeded by fellow party member Einar Holmer-Hoven in 2019.

He was elected county mayor of Agder at the 2019 local elections, becoming the first county mayor of a unified Agder county. He won re-election at the 2023 local elections.
