= Harald Sødal =

Norwegian politician

- Born: May 20, 1938 (age 88)
- Occupation: politician
- Known for: Deputy mayor of Kristiansand

Harald Sødal (born 20 May 1938) is a Norwegian politician for the Christian Democratic Party.

He became a deputy councilman in Kristiansand city council in 1967, and advanced to a regular representative in 1971. In 2007 he started his tenth period in the city council. He was deputy mayor for four terms.

He is a member of the board of Arkivet and Vest-Agder-museet. He belongs to the Evangelical Lutheran Free Church of Norway, but is also a member of the Church of Norway. He is also an avid amateur musician and choir leader.
