= JEF Norway =

Norwegian youth organization

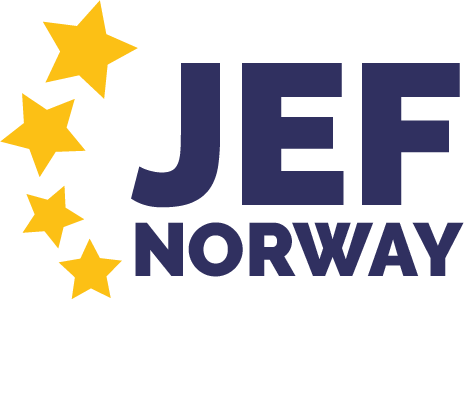
- Formation: 1973
- Headquarters: Oslo
- Location: Norway
- Leader: Tora Tveiten
- Website: https://engelsk.europeiskungdom.no/

JEF Norway (Europeisk Ungdom, literally European Youth) is a youth organization that works for European cooperation and Norwegian membership in the European Union. European Youth is affiliated with the National Council for Norwegian Children and Youth Organizations (LNU) and Young European Federalists (Jeunes Européens fédéralistes (JEF). Together with the European Movement in Norway, European Youth shares office space in the Europehouse in Oslo.

== History ==
The organization was founded in 1973, after the first referendum on Norwegian EC membership in 1972. Before the official establishment, the organization was called the Interim Board for the European Movement's Youth. The organization was central to the Norwegian EU struggle in 1994. In the early 1990s, Europeisk Ungdom was one of Norway's largest youth organizations with close to 10,000 members.

== The Central Board ==
European Youth is currently headed by Kristine Meek Stokke (2023 d.d.) General Secretary is Katinka Kolaas Ekmann (2023 -d.d.). The rest of the boardmembers are as following: Ulrik Stange, Tora Tveiten, Solveig Martha Tynkkynen, Hanna Lein-Mathisen, Benjamin Sandsmark, Martin Jølle, Marta Abelsen, Viviannè Bach, Nils Jørund Lieberg Stieng, and Ole Flåm Svendsen.

== European Youth Today ==
European Youth has presence in most Norwegian counties, and local teams in around 20 of the largest municipalities in the country. The organizational center is in the big cities: Oslo, Bergen, Stavanger and Trondheim. The National Board is the highest permanent body in European Youth, apart from the National Meetings every second autumn. The body consists of the central board, five to three directly elected representatives chosen by the national assembly, one representative from each county and one representative from local associations with 100 or more paying members. The central board is responsible for day-to-day operations, and meets more often than the national board. The secretariat consists of two people: the manager and the general secretary. The organization has more than 700 paying members (2021). The members are often connected to other youth organizations and Norwegian youth parties such as Unge Høyre, AUF, Unge Venstre and Grønn Ungdom. The average age is around 21 years, with active members aged between 13 and 26.

== International Work ==
European Youth is connected to the umbrella organization Jeunes Européens fédéralistes (Young European Federalists). Internationally, European Youth collaborates actively with sister organizations in the Balkans, in Eastern Europe and in the Nordics. Since 2003, European Youth has carried out the democracy project Balkan Training Days with participating organizations from all the countries in the Western Balkans. The project is about democratization in the region, organizational development and cooperation across national borders. From 2010–2013, European Youth organized a similar democracy project in Belarus to strengthen the young civil society's prerequisites for overthrowing Europe's last dictatorship. The commitment to Belarus is still present through Free Belarus/Democracy Under Pressure, an action to highlight the fact that democracy cannot be taken for granted, even in Europe. European Youth works closely with the Nordic sister organisations, and among other things contributed to the establishment of European Youth Iceland in 2010.

== European Of The Year Award ==
Every year, The European Youth awards the award "European of the Year". The prize is awarded to the person/s or organization who have made an extraordinary effort for the EU cause in Norway or for cooperation in Europe. Previous award winners include Ukraine (2022), Venstre (2021), The Norwegian Helsinki Committee (2020), Ine Eriksen Søreide (2019), Espen Barth Eide (2018), Frank Bakke-Jensen (2017), Grete Berget (2017), Hanne Skartveit (2016) Simen Ekern (2015), Eirik Riise (2014), Kjetil Wiedswang (2013), Sveinung Rotevatn (2012), Nikolai Astrup (2011), Erik Solheim (2010), Eva Joly (2009) and Kristin Clemet (2008).
