= Kjell Ingolf Ropstad =

Norwegian politician (born 1985)

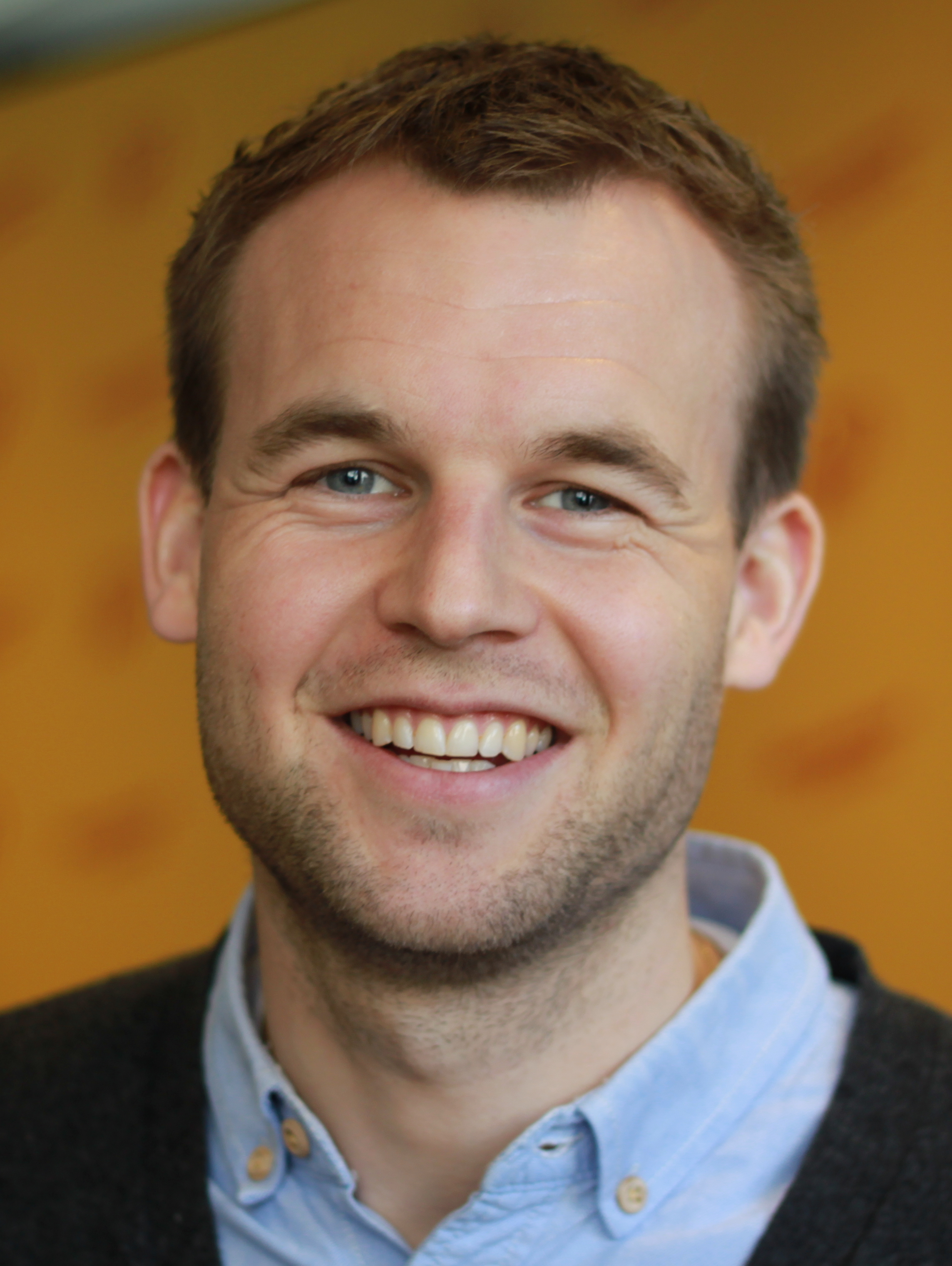
- Ropstad in 2015.

Minister of Children, Family and Church Affairs
- In office 22 January 2019 – 20 September 2021
- Prime Minister: Erna Solberg
- Preceded by: Linda Hofstad Helleland
- Succeeded by: Olaug Bollestad

Leader of the Christian Democratic Party
- In office 27 April 2019 – 24 September 2021
- First Deputy: Olaug Bollestad
- Second Deputy: Ingelin Noresjø
- Preceded by: Knut Arild Hareide
- Succeeded by: Olaug Bollestad

Second Deputy Leader of the Christian Democratic Party
- In office 29 April 2017 – 27 April 2019
- Leader: Knut Arild Hareide; Olaug Bollestad (acting)
- Preceded by: Olaug Bollestad
- Succeeded by: Ingelin Noresjø

Member of the Storting
- Incumbent
- Assumed office 9 October 2009
- Deputy: Jorunn Gleditsch Lossius
- Constituency: Vest-Agder

Leader of the Young Christian Democrats
- In office 25 June 2007 – 18 September 2010
- Preceded by: Inger Lise Hansen
- Succeeded by: Elisabeth Løland

First Deputy Leader of the Young Christian Democrats
- In office 19 June 2005 – 25 June 2007
- Leader: Inger Lise Hansen
- Preceded by: Inger Lise Hansen
- Succeeded by: Hilde Ekeberg

Personal details
- Born: 1 June 1985 (age 41) Arendal, Aust-Agder, Norway
- Party: Christian Democratic
- Spouse: Arnbjørg Vedelden
- Children: 2

Military service
- Allegiance: Norway
- Branch/service: Norwegian Army

Kjell Ingolf Ropstad (born 1 June 1985) is a Norwegian politician for the Christian Democratic Party, who served as the Minister of Children, Family and Church Affairs and the leader of the Christian Democratic Party from 2019 to 2021. He has been a member of the Norwegian Parliament, the Storting, since 2009.

== Personal background and education ==
Kjell Ingolf Ropstad was born in Arendal in 1985 to teacher Gunda Wiberg and Bjørn Alfred Ropstad, who was mayor of Evje og Hornnes Municipality. He has a bachelor's degree in law and economics.

== Political career ==
=== Local politics ===
He was a member of the municipal council of Evje og Hornnes Municipality from 2003 to 2007, and the Aust-Agder county council from 2003 to 2007.

=== Youth league ===
He was the leader of the Youth of the Christian People's Party, the youth wing of the Christian Democratic Party, from 2007 to 2010. He had previously been deputy leader from 2005 to 2007.

=== Parliament ===
He served as a deputy representative to the Storting from Aust-Agder during the term 2005–2009. He was elected a representative from Aust-Agder for the period 2009–2013 and has been re-elected since. In May 2024, he announced that he wouldn't seek re-election at the 2025 election.

=== Party leader ===
Ropstad had been elected as second deputy leader of the party in 2017.

From late 2018 to early 2019, he led the party's negotiations to enter the Solberg Cabinet after the path choice initiated by then leader Knut Arild Hareide. When negotiations were finished, he alongside two other party members, were appointed to the cabinet on 22 January 2019. Ropstad himself became Minister of Children and Family Affairs, and was also subsequently elected party leader in April the same year.

Ropstad led the party into 2021 election, with his party seeing its seat number reduce to 3 and their overall percentage to 3,8 nationwide. Former Knut Arild Hareide advisor Åshild Mathisen expressed that it was an indication of the party's "death". Ropstad himself argued to the contrary saying it was the exact reason the party had to prove the contrary despite the poor result.

Following his announced resignation on 18 September 2021, the central board of the Christian Democratic Party decided that Ropstad would step down as leader on 24 September related to their national board meeting. It was also announced that Olaug Bollestad would become acting leader. Bollestad was acting leader until the extraordinary convention held on 13 November, where she was elected leader on a permanent basis.

=== Minister of Children and Family Affairs ===
Upon assuming office as minister, the responsibilities for equality and LGBT issues were moved to the minister of culture. Prior to the unveiling of the reshuffled cabinet, a source said the change was for the Christian Democrats to focus more on their promise areas such as children, family affairs and kindergartens, and avoid trouble with questions regarding the LGBT community and abortion.

In June 2019, several Christian Democratic politicians expressed criticism to Ropstad about not attending Pride parades. Ropstad had previously said in 2017, that it was fine to support the LGBT community and Pride, but he didn't have to walk in a parade to show it.

The week before 26 May 2020, Ropstad stated that the Christian Democrats would add changes to the Biotechnology law. He and his party attempted to secure more conservative Progress Party votes, but when the Storting voted the week after, the party suffered a major loss in reforming the law. Instead, the other government parties, along with all opposition parties, voted for their own changes, which marked the first change in the law since 2004.

Ropstad was on parental leave between 2 June and 21 August, with Ida Lindtveit Røse stepping in as acting minister during this time.

A week before the 2021 election, media outlets revealed that Ropstad had received free housing for a parliamentary commuter home, paid by taxpayers, while at the same time being registered at his parents' home address. He only re-registered his address in November 2020, after having been registered at his parents' address since he was elected to Parliament in 2009. It was also specified that he had purchased a house in Lillestrøm, which he also rented out. Ropstad issued an apology, but insisted that he hadn't broken any laws. The Storting presidency later announced that they would look into the rules and regulations regarding parliamentary commuter homes when more revelations about other politicians having done the same or similar in nature, as Ropstad.

Days after the election, further revelations from Aftenposten revealed that Ropstad had taken active measures to avoid taxation for the commuter home in Oslo. He admitted to this in a press conference on 17 September, but said he wouldn't step down and would like to continue as minister until a new government was in place. He also expressed he wanted to continue as party leader, despite some county party leaders calling his leadership into question as a breach of trust. The day after, he announced at a press conference that he would be stepping down as both party leader and minister. He specified he would remain leader until the party had elected a successor.

== Personal life ==
Ropstad is married to Arnbjørg Vedelden, with whom he has two children.

Party political offices
Preceded by Inger Lise Hansen	First Deputy Leader of the Young Christian Democrats; 2005–2007	Succeeded by Hilde Ekeberg
Preceded by Inger Lise Hansen	Leader of the Young Christian Democrats; 2007–2010	Succeeded by Elisabeth Løland
Preceded by Olaug Bollestad	Second Deputy Leader of the Christian Democratic Party; 2017–2019	Succeeded by Ingelin Noresjø
Preceded by Knut Arild Hareide	Leader of the Christian Democratic Party; 2019–2021	Succeeded by Olaug Bollestad
Political offices
Preceded by Linda Hofstad Helleland	Minister of Children and Family Affairs; 2019–2021	Succeeded by Olaug Bollestad
