= Christian Democratic Party (Norway) =

Christian-democratic political party in Norway

Christian People's Party Kristelig Folkeparti Kristeleg Folkeparti
- Abbreviation: KrF
- Leader: Dag Inge Ulstein
- Founders: Nils Lavik... and 21 others: Nils Tveit; Ingebrigt Bjørø; Anderssen Rysst
- Founded: 4 September 1933 in Bergen
- Headquarters: Øvre Slottsgate 18–20 0154, Oslo
- Newspaper: Folkets Framtid (1947–2005)
- Youth wing: Young Christian Democrats
- Membership (2023): ▼15,000
- Ideology: Christian democracy
- Political position: Centre-right
- Religion: Church of Norway
- European affiliation: European People's Party (observer)
- Nordic affiliation: Centre Group
- Colours: Yellow; Black
- Slogan: "Building on values – creating values"
- Anthem: Ta vare på livet
- Storting: 7 / 169
- County Councils: 29 / 664
- County Mayors: 0 / 15
- Municipal Councils: 396 / 9,122
- Municipal Mayors: 12 / 357
- Sami Parliament: 0 / 39

Website
- krf.no

The Christian Democratic Party (Bokmål: Kristelig Folkeparti, Nynorsk: Kristeleg Folkeparti, lit. 'Christian People's Party', KrF; Northern Sami: Risttalaš Álbmotbellodat) is a Christian-democratic political party in Norway founded in 1933. The party is an observer member of the European People's Party (EPP). It currently holds seven seats in the Parliament, having won 4.2% of the vote in the 2025 parliamentary election. The current leader of the party is Dag Inge Ulstein.

The Christian Democrats' leader from 1983 to 1995, Kjell Magne Bondevik, was one of the most prominent political figures in modern Norway, serving as Prime Minister from 1997 to 2000 and 2001 to 2005. Under the old leadership of Bondevik and Valgerd Svarstad Haugland, the party to some extent moved in a more liberal direction. Due largely to their poor showing in the 2009 elections, the party has seen a conflict between its conservative and liberal wings. Until 2019, the leader was Knut Arild Hareide, who led the party into a more liberal direction as part of a "renewal" process, and introduced climate change and environmentalism as the party's most important issues. However, the liberal turn ended in 2019 and the party has since shifted more to the right. Hareide wanted the party to cooperate with the social democrats, but narrowly lost an internal struggle to the faction that wanted to collaborate with the Progress Party.

== History ==
The Christian Democratic Party was founded as a reaction to the growing secularism in Norway in the 1930s. Cultural and spiritual values were proposed as an alternative to political parties focusing on material values. The immediate cause of its foundation was the failure of Nils Lavik, a popular figure in the religious community, to be nominated as a candidate for the Liberal Party, for the parliamentary elections in 1933. In reaction to this, Kristelig Folkeparti was set up, with Lavik as their top candidate in the county of Hordaland. He succeeded in being elected to Stortinget, the Norwegian parliament. No other counties were contested. At the next elections, in 1936, the party also ran a common list with the Liberal Party in Bergen, and succeeded in electing two representatives from Hordaland with 20.9% of the local votes. In 1945, at the first elections after the Nazi occupation of Norway, the party was organised on a nationwide basis, and won 8 seats.

The Christian Democrats became part of a short-lived non-socialist coalition government along with the Conservative Party, the Liberal Party and the Centre Party in 1963. At the elections of 1965, these four parties won a majority of seats in Stortinget and ruled in a coalition government from 1965 to 1971.

The Christian Democrats opposed Norwegian membership in the European Community ahead of the referendum in 1972. The referendum gave a no-vote, and when the pro-EC Labour government resigned, a coalition government was formed among the anti-EC parties, the Christian Democrats, the Liberal Party and the Centre Party. Lars Korvald became the Christian Democrats' first prime minister for a year, until the elections of 1973 restored the Labour government.

The party's historic membership numbers peaked with 69,000 members in 1980.

The 1981 elections left the non-socialists with a majority in parliament, but negotiations for a coalition government failed because of disagreement over the abortion issue. However, this issue was later toned down, and from 1983 to 1986 and 1989 to 1990, the Christian Democrats were part of coalitions with the Conservative Party and the Centre Party.

In 1997, the Christian Democrats received 13.7% of the votes, and got 25 seats in the Storting. Kjell Magne Bondevik served as prime minister between 1997 and 2000, in coalition with the Liberal Party and the Centre Party, and then between 2001 and 2005 with the Liberal Party and the Conservative Party.

Party logo until 2025

In the 2005 election, the Christian Democrats received only 6.8%, and the party became part of the opposition in the Storting. In 2013, the Conservative Party and the Progress Party formed a new government based on a political agreement with the Christian Democrats and the Liberal party with confidence and supply. In the 2017 election, the party got only 4.2% and did not sign a new agreement, but got a politically strategic position as the conservative minority government mainly depended on their votes to get a majority.

In late 2018, the Christian Democrats were split over the question of a potential government participation and the future direction of the party. At a party meeting in early November 2018, the delegates were asked whether to stay in opposition or to join either a "red" or a "blue" government coalition with party leader Knut Arild Hareide favouring a centre-left government with Labour and Centre parties, and deputy leaders Olaug Bollestad and Kjell Ingolf Ropstad wanting to join the existing right-leaning cabinet of Erna Solberg. The delegates decided with a narrow majority of eight votes to join the existing Solberg's Cabinet with Conservatives, Liberals and the Progress Party. In January 2019, after successful negotiations with the coalition parties the Christian Democrats eventually joined the government and Hareide resigned as party leader. In April 2019, 33-year-old Minister of Children and Family Kjell Ingolf Ropstad was elected new party leader.

The Christian Democrats failed to pass the 4% election threshold for leveling seats in the 2021 election and won only three seats in parliament. The party leader Ropstad, facing controversy over his use of a parliamentary commuter home, resigned from the cabinet and as party leader on 24 September and Olaug Bollestad assumed leadership of the party. In 2024, Dag Inge Ulstein assumed leadership of the party, and the party more than doubled their representation in the Storting to seven in the 2025 elections.

== Political ideology ==
The Christian Democratic Party is generally considered to be centre-right. The party holds European Christian democratic positions, including family values and social conservatism. While founded on the basis of advocating moral-cultural Christian issues, the party has broadened or shrunk its political profile over time, while still maintaining right-wing positions.

=== Religion ===
As a party centred on Christian values, the party draws support from the Christian population. Their policies that support Christian values and oppose same-sex marriage appeal to the more conservative, religious base.

Geographically, the Christian Democrats enjoy their strongest support in the so-called Bible Belt, especially Southern Norway. In the 2005 elections, their best results were in Vest-Agder with 18.9% of the vote, compared to a national average of 6.8%.

Since the party was established, a declaration of Christian faith had been required for a person to be a representative in the party. Membership had no such requirement. The increase of support for the party from other religious groups, such as Muslims, stimulated efforts to abolish this rule. At the 2013 convention the rule was modified. The new rules require that representatives work for Christian values but do not require them to declare a Christian faith. This latter point was considered the "last drop" for some conservative elements of the party, who as a result broke away and founded The Christians Party. It has been claimed that KrF have lost votes to the Christians.

=== Social values ===
The Christian Democratic Party is generally socially conservative.

The party opposes euthanasia and abortion, except in cases of rape or when the mother's life is at risk. The party supports accessibility to contraception as a way of lowering abortion rates.

KrF wishes to ban the use of human foetuses in research and has expressed scepticism of proposals to liberalise biotechnology laws in Norway. Bondevik's second government made the biotechnology laws of Norway among the strictest in the world, with support from the Socialist Left Party and the Centre Party, but a 2004 case involving a child with thalassemia brought the laws under fire.

==== LGBTQ issues ====
On LGBTQ issues, the party supports permitting same-sex couples to live together but opposes same-sex marriage and adoption rights. The party has criticized the Polish government's policy towards LGBT people, and supported the Norwegian government's decision to withdraw financial support to Polish municipalities that have declared themselves as LGBT-free zones. The party's leader at the time, Kjell Ingolf Ropstad, stated: "To not be discriminated against because of one's sexual orientation is a fundamental human right. Therefore, it is important that the government now is clear about the terms of receiving financial support through the EEA funds. We want to support a policy that protects diversity and freedom." The party maintains neutrality on the issue of gay clergy, calling that an issue for the Church. In 2024, party leader Dag Inge Ulstein voiced his opposition to so-called "gender ideology."

=== Foreign policy ===
In foreign policy, the party marks itself as a supporter of NATO and the European Economic Area (EEA) but they oppose Norwegian membership in the European Union (EU). The party supports Norway's signature and ratification of the UN Treaty on the Prohibition of Nuclear Weapons and want stricter rules for Norwegian arms sales abroad. The party is supportive of Israel and Ukraine in the Russo-Ukrainian War.

==== Development aid ====
Since the turn of the millennium, the Christian Democratic Party has had a major influence on development aid policy in Norway. The first Minister of International Development was Reidun Brusletten (KrF) in 1983. Hilde Frafjord Johnson held the position from 1997 to 2000 and again from 2001 to 2005, during Bondevik's First and Second Cabinet.

Dag Inge Ulstein, the third Christian Democrat to hold the position, addressed the need to take care of vulnerable minorities in foreign policy and by the use of humanitarian aid. He described these group as: women, children, people with disabilities and sexual and religious minorities.

The Christian Democratic Party is a strong supporter of increased development aid and more cooperation with developing countries. They want 1 percent of the GNI to be spent on development aid, and a larger share of the sum to be spent on poverty reduction and climate change adaptation.

==== COVID-19 ====
Ulstein has played a prominent role in the global handling of the COVID-19 pandemic, with a focus on fair distribution of vaccines to poor and middle income countries. As Minister of International Development, he has been the governments spokesperson regarding Norway's contribution in the global fight against COVID-19, which involves the contribution of 2.2 billion Norwegian kroner to vaccine development through CEPI, in March 2020, and Norway's entry in the global vaccine cooperation COVAX in August 2020, as one of the first European countries.

In March 2021, it became clear that the Norwegian government had donated 700,000 vaccine doses to low income countries in February the previous year. This created big reactions from other parties, who thought Norway instead should have given the doses to the Norwegian population. The Christian Democratic Party received a lot of criticism from, among others, the leaders of the Progress Party and the Centre Party, Sylvi Listhaug and Trygve Slagsvold Vedum, respectively. Party leader, Kjell Ingolf Ropstad, condemned the criticism and stated: "The last thing the world needs now is more egoism and competition between countries. Instead we need to help each other. We will not succeed in the fight against COVID-19 if we only say "Norway first".

=== Immigration and refugees ===
On questions surrounding immigration, integration and refugee policy, the party has a liberal stance. The Christian Democratic Party wants to base Norway's intake of refugees on the UN High Commissioner for Refugees' recommendations. In 2021, they announced that they want Norway to take in 5,000 refugees annually, plus 500 extra from the Moria refugee camp on Lesbos, Greece.

They have also criticized what they believe is an unfair distribution of refugees fleeing the Syrian civil war due to the fact that Syria's neighbouring countries (Turkey, Jordan and Lebanon) have received a higher number of refugees than many European countries. Therefore, they want Norway, and western European countries at large, to retrieve a larger amount of refugees from Syria.

=== Climate change ===
The Christian Democratic Party support international climate goals and climate agreements, like the Paris agreement. They want to cut Norwegian emissions of carbon by at least 55% by 2030, compared with 1990 levels, and they aim for a climate-neutral Norway by 2050. They have addressed the need for restructuring in the Norwegian petroleum industry and want to end oil and gas exploration in new areas.

Protection of the vulnerable areas of Lofoten, Vesterålen and Senja from oil drilling, has been an important matter for the Christian Democratic Party. After the 2017 Norwegian parliamentary election, Knut Arild Hareide, party leader at the time, announced that the Christian Democratic Party would withdraw their support of Solberg's Cabinet if they opened the areas for oil drilling. When the Christian Democratic Party became part of Solberg's coalition government in January 2019, it was decided that the areas were to be protected until the next election.

At the national congress in 2021, the party proposed the creation of a Norwegian climate fund. The goal of the fund was to outcompete the use of coal power, by investing in renewable energy in developing countries. The Christian Democrats got the proposal through in the Storting, and a few months later the government decided to establish a climate fund consisting of 1.15 billion dollars. Experts estimated that the fund could result in more than 10 billion dollars in private investment in renewable energy. The deputy leader of the Norwegian environmental organisation ZERO, Dagfrid Froberg, described the fund as: "Maybe the most important Norwegian measurement in order to fight climate change."

The Christian Democratic Party wants increased funding of public transport projects outside Oslo, like the Bergen Light Rail. They want to accomplish this by making the government finance a larger share of the cost of developing local public transport systems, in order to make public transport more accessible and efficient, especially for people with disabilities.

== List of party leaders ==
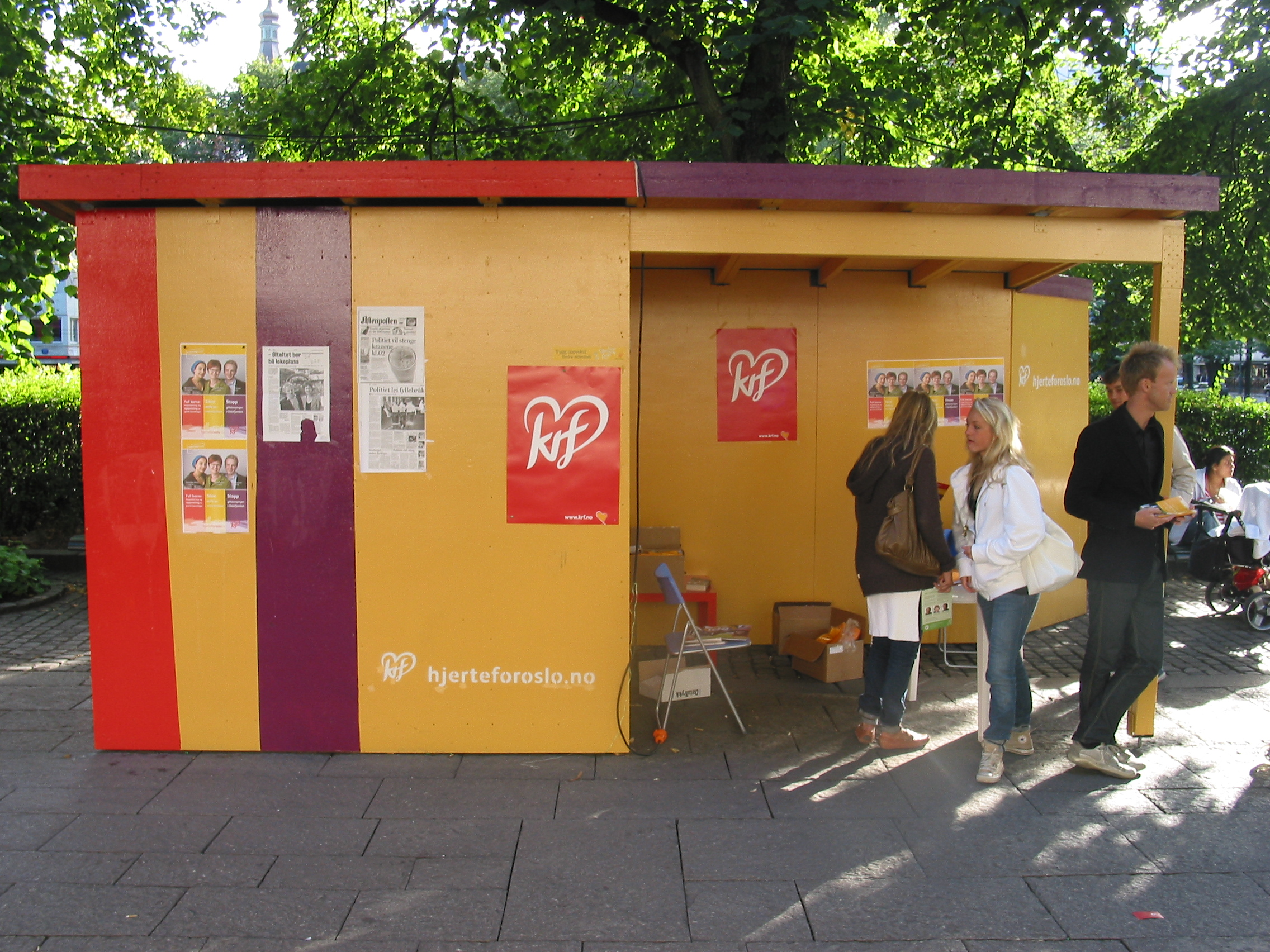
Campaign booth on Karl Johans gate ahead of the 2007 Norwegian local elections.

- Ingebrigt Bjørø (1933–38)
- Nils Lavik (1938–51)
- Erling Wikborg (1951–55)
- Einar Hareide (1955–67)
- Lars Korvald (1967–75)
- Kåre Kristiansen (1975–77)
- Lars Korvald (1977–79)
- Kåre Kristiansen (1979–83)
- Kjell Magne Bondevik (1983–95)
- Valgerd Svarstad Haugland (1995–2004)
- Dagfinn Høybråten (2004–11)
- Knut Arild Hareide (2011–19)
- Kjell Ingolf Ropstad (2019–21)
- Olaug Bollestad (2021–24)
- Dag Inge Ulstein (2024–)

== Notable people ==
- Harald Sødal (born 1938), Norwegian politician

== Election results ==
=== Storting ===
Election	Leader	Votes	%	Seats	+/–	Position	Status
1933	Ingebrigt Bjørø	10,272	0.8	1 / 150	New	▲7th	Opposition
1936	Ingebrigt Bjørø	19,612	1.3	2 / 150	▲1	▲5th	Opposition
1945	Nils Lavik	117,813	7.9	8 / 150	▲6	▼6th	Opposition
1949	Nils Lavik	147,068	8.4	9 / 150	▲1	▲5th	Opposition
1953	Erling Wikborg	186,627	10.5	14 / 150	▲5	▲4th	Opposition
1957	Einar Hareide	183,243	10.2	12 / 150	▼2	▼5th	Opposition
1961 (Note: The Christian Democratic Party ran on joint lists with other parties in a few constituencies from 1961 to 1981. Vote numbers are from independent Christian Democratic lists only, while vote percentage also includes the Christian Democratic Party's estimated share from joint lists (Statistics Norway estimates).)	Einar Hareide	171,451	9.6	15 / 150	▲3	▲4th	Opposition (1961–1963)
1961	Einar Hareide	171,451	9.6	15 / 150	▲3	▲4th	Coalition (1963)
1961	Einar Hareide	171,451	9.6	15 / 150	▲3	▲4th	Opposition (1963–1965)
1965	Einar Hareide	160,331	8.1	13 / 150	▼2	▼5th	Coalition
1969	Lars Korvald	169,303	9.4	14 / 150	▲1	▲4th	Coalition (1969–1971)
1969	Lars Korvald	169,303	9.4	14 / 150	▲1	▲4th	Opposition (1971–1972)
1969	Lars Korvald	169,303	9.4	14 / 150	▲1	▲4th	Coalition (1972–1973)
1973	Lars Korvald	255,456	12.3	20 / 155	▲6	4th	Opposition
1977	Lars Korvald	224,355	12.4	22 / 155	▲2	▲3rd	Opposition
1981	Kåre Kristiansen	219,179	9.4	15 / 155	▼7	3rd	Opposition (1981–1983)
1981	Kåre Kristiansen	219,179	9.4	15 / 155	▼7	3rd	Coalition (1983–1985)
1985	Kjell Magne Bondevik	214,969	8.3	16 / 157	▲1	3rd	Coalition (1985–1986)
1985	Kjell Magne Bondevik	214,969	8.3	16 / 157	▲1	3rd	Opposition (1986–1989)
1989	Kjell Magne Bondevik	224,852	8.5	14 / 165	▼2	▼5th	Coalition (1989–1990)
1989	Kjell Magne Bondevik	224,852	8.5	14 / 165	▼2	▼5th	Opposition (1990–1993)
1993	Kjell Magne Bondevik	193,885	7.9	13 / 165	▼1	5th	Opposition
1997	Kjell Magne Bondevik	353,082	13.7	25 / 165	▲12	▲3rd	Coalition (1997–2000)
1997	Kjell Magne Bondevik	353,082	13.7	25 / 165	▲12	▲3rd	Opposition (2000–2001)
2001	Kjell Magne Bondevik	312,839	12.4	22 / 165	▼3	▼5th	Coalition
2005	Dagfinn Høybråten	178,885	6.8	11 / 169	▼11	5th	Opposition
2009	Dagfinn Høybråten	148,748	5.5	10 / 169	▼1	▼6th	Opposition
2013	Knut Arild Hareide	158,475	5.6	10 / 169	Steady	▲4th	External support
2017	Knut Arild Hareide	122,688	4.2	8 / 169	▼2	▼7th	External support (2017–2019)
2017	Knut Arild Hareide	122,688	4.2	8 / 169	▼2	▼7th	Coalition (2019–2021)
2021	Kjell Ingolf Ropstad	113,344	3.8	3 / 169	▼5	▼9th	Opposition
2025	Dag-Inge Ulstein	135,230	4.2	7 / 169	▲4	▲8th	Opposition

=== Local elections ===
Year		1934	1937	1945	1947	1951	1955	1959	1963	1967	1971	1975	1979	1983	1987	1991	1995	1999	2003	2007	2011	2015	2019	2023
Vote %	Municipal	1.0	1.53	7.9	7.4	7.3	7.4	7.5	6.8	7.1	8.7	11.47	9.84	8.52	7.80	7.81	8.21	9.35	6.42	6.38	5.57	5.4	4.00	3.97
Vote %	County	—N/a										12.26	10.2	8.8	8.1	8.06	8.50	10.07	6.87	6.72	5.79	5.6	4.5	4.45
