= 2021 Norwegian parliamentary election =

- 13 September 2021

All 169 seats in the Storting 85 seats are needed for a majority
- Registered: 3,891,736
- Turnout: 77.17% (▼1.19 pp)
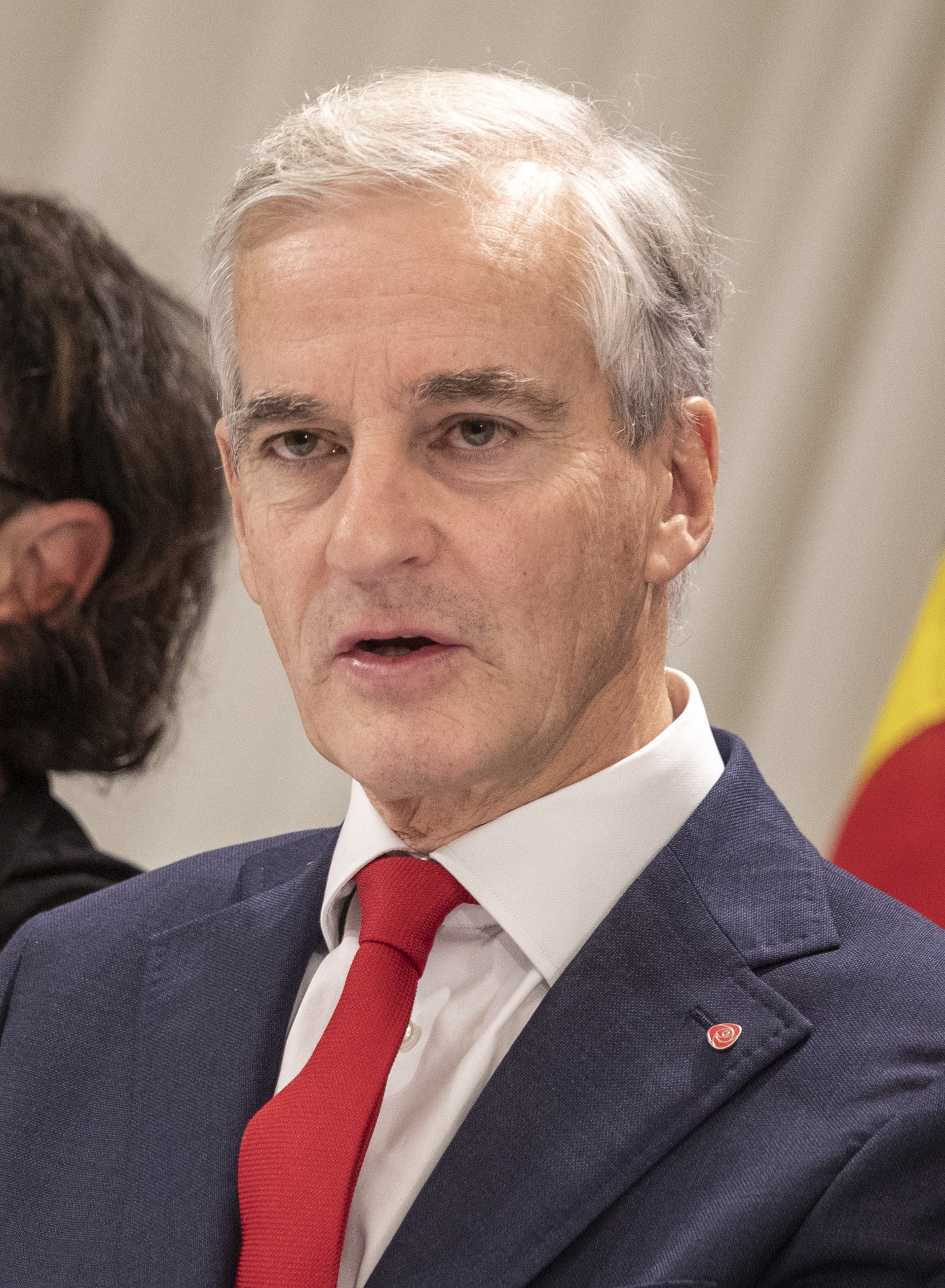

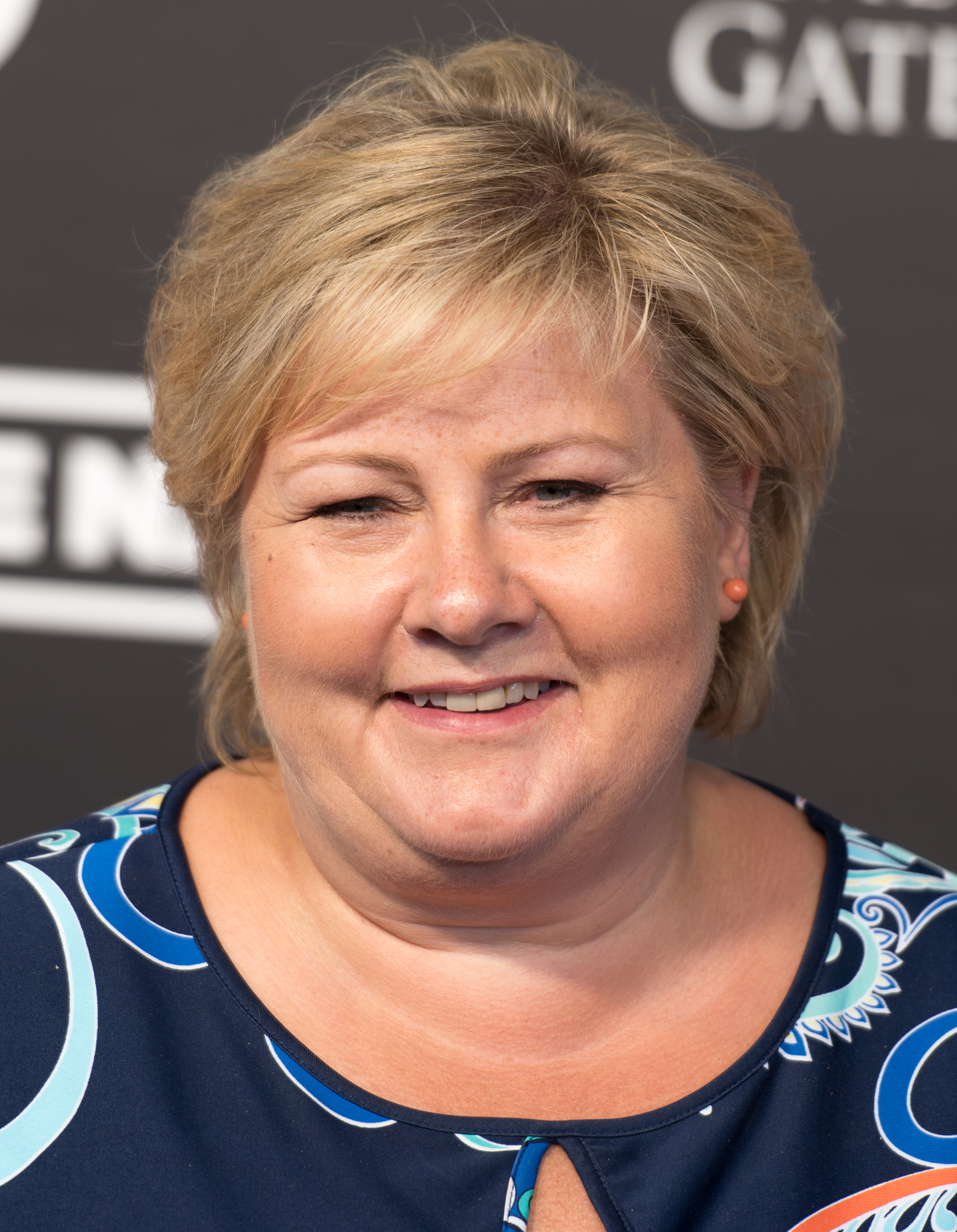

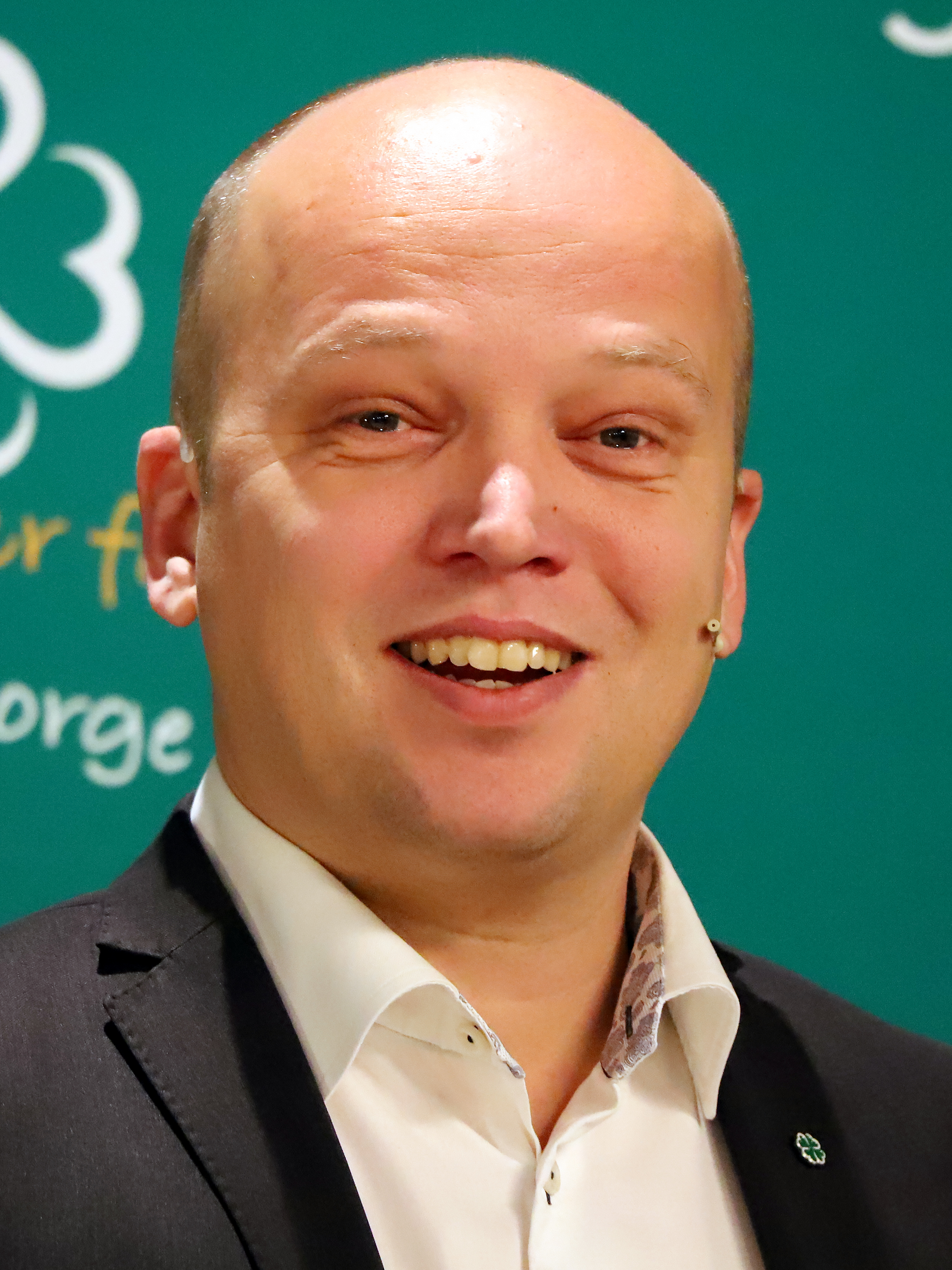

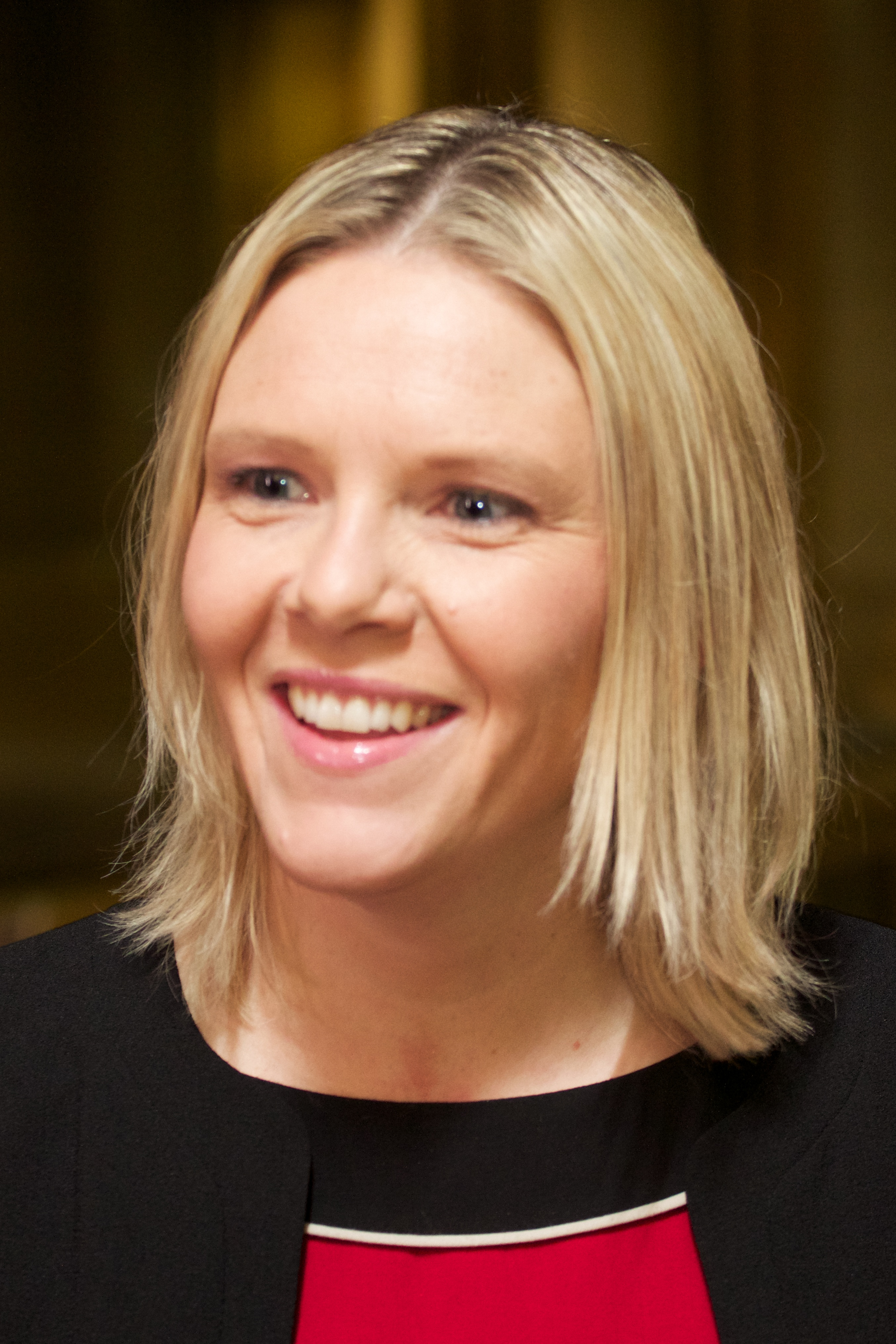

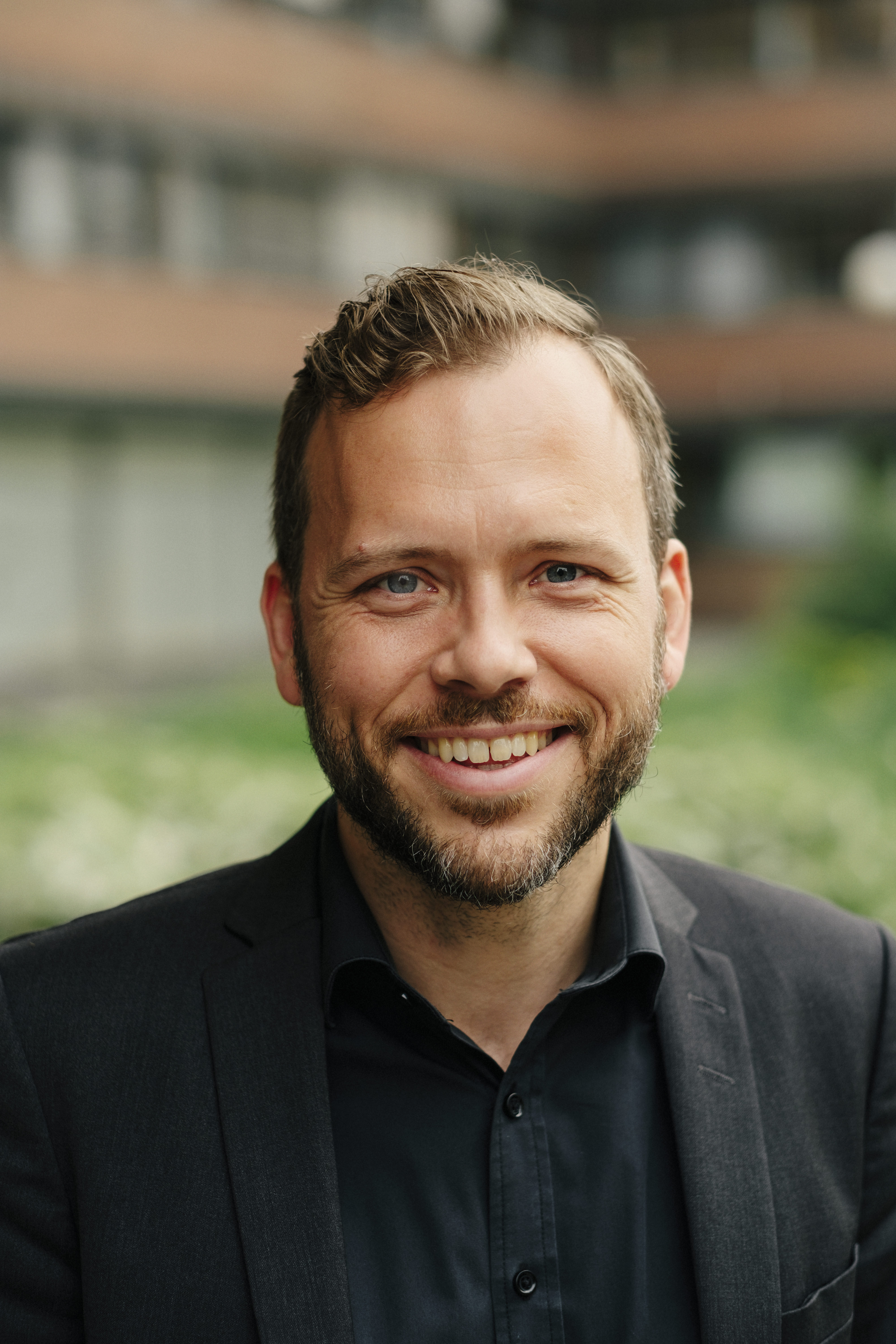

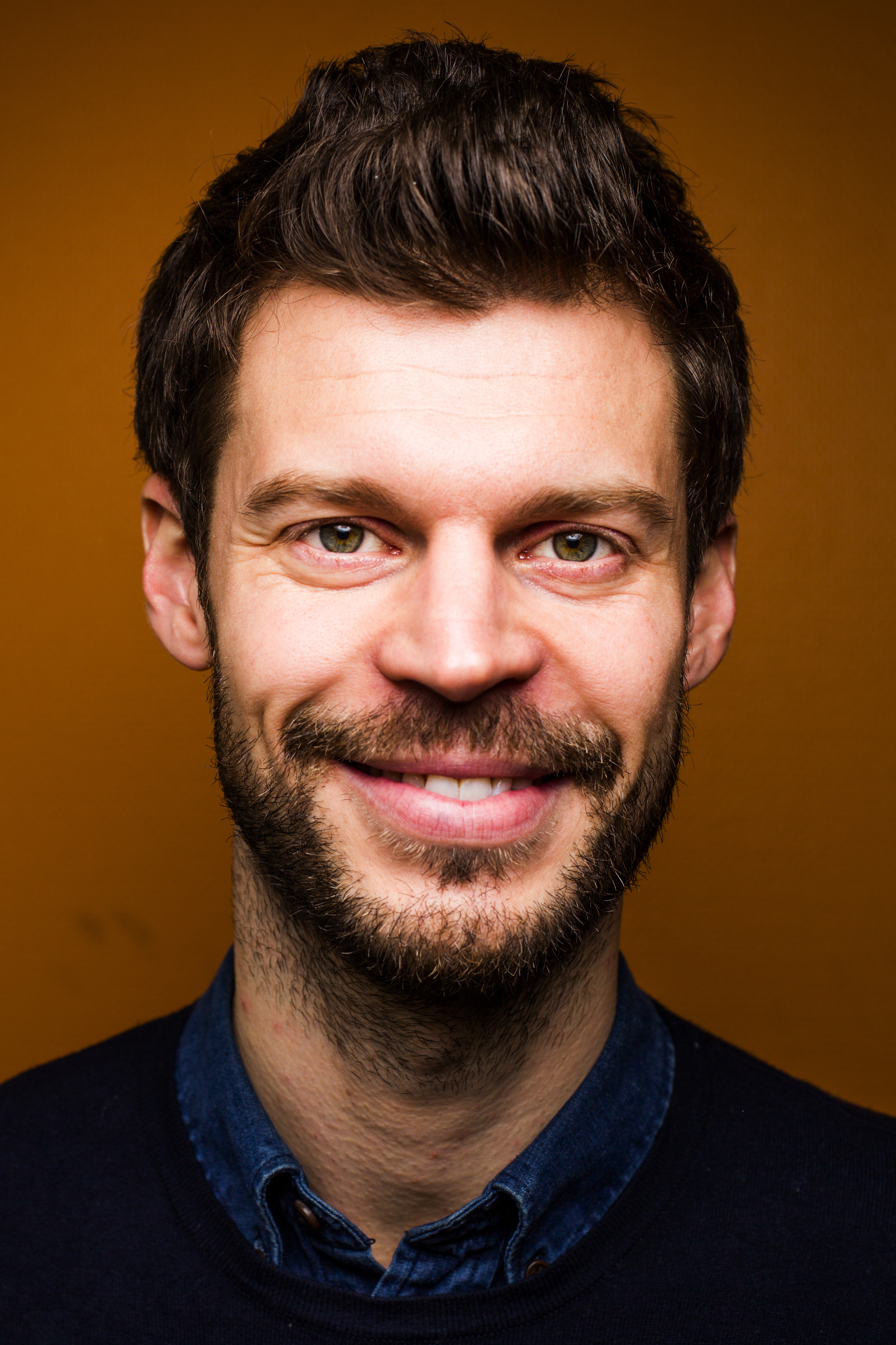

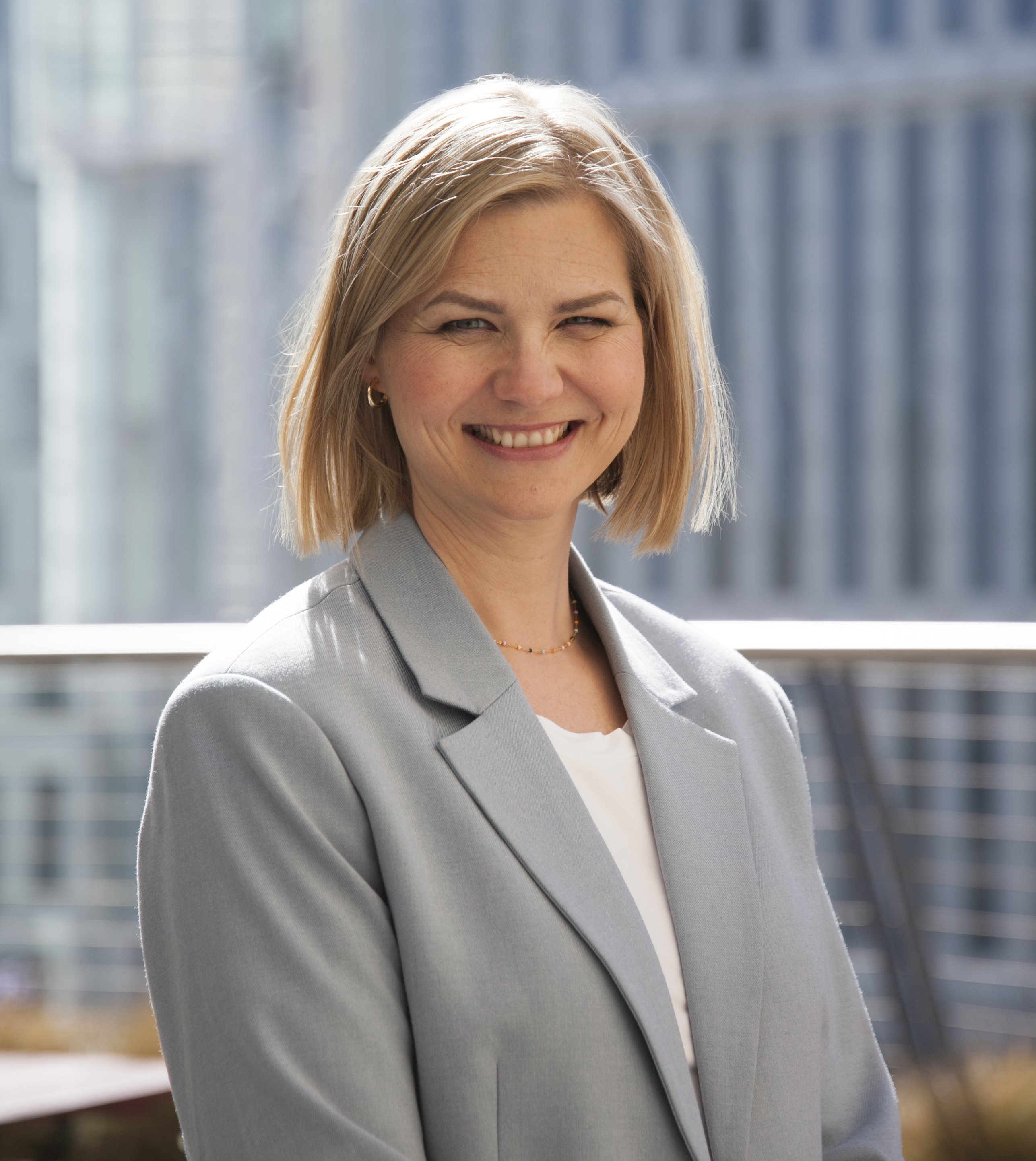

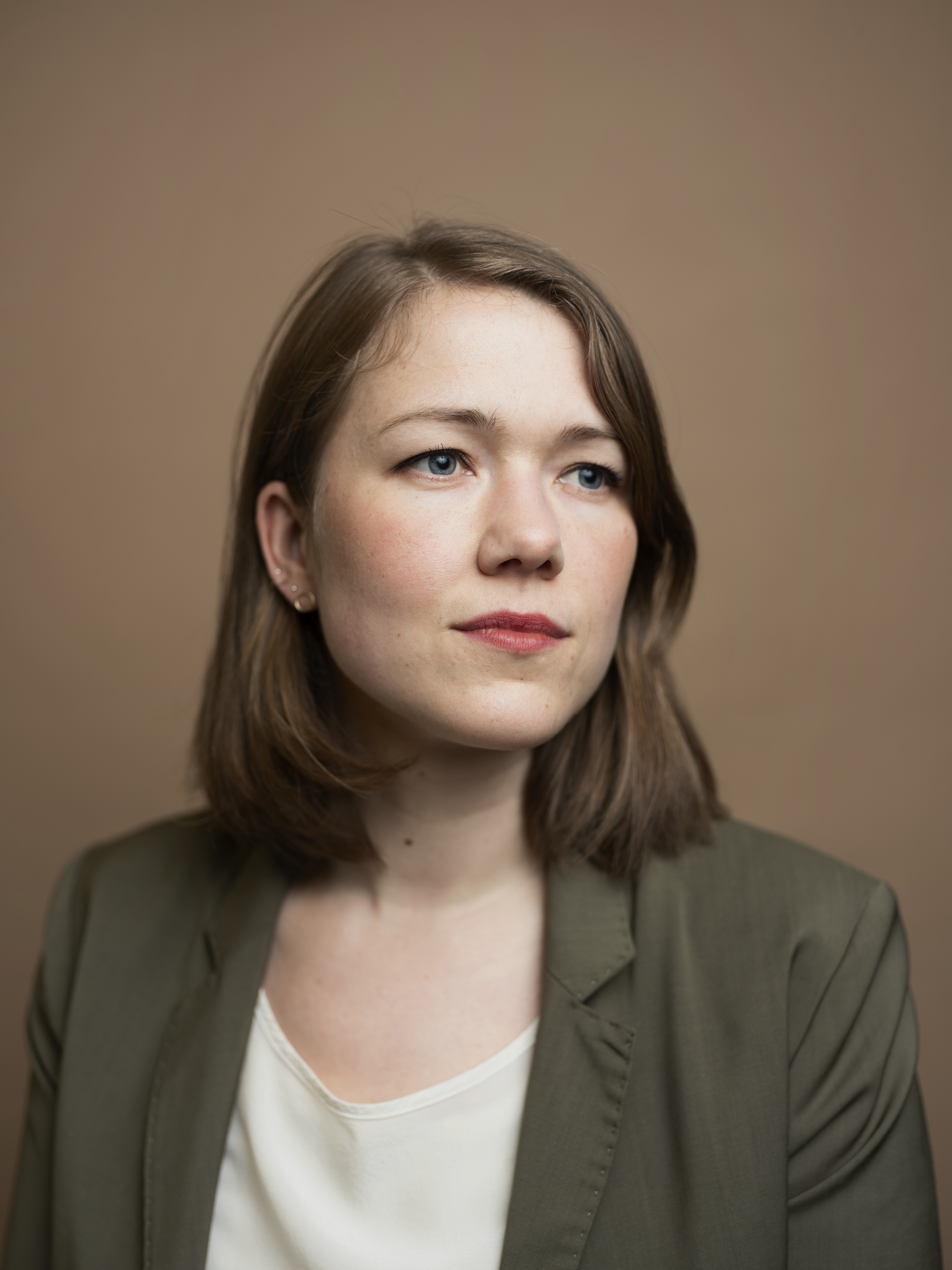

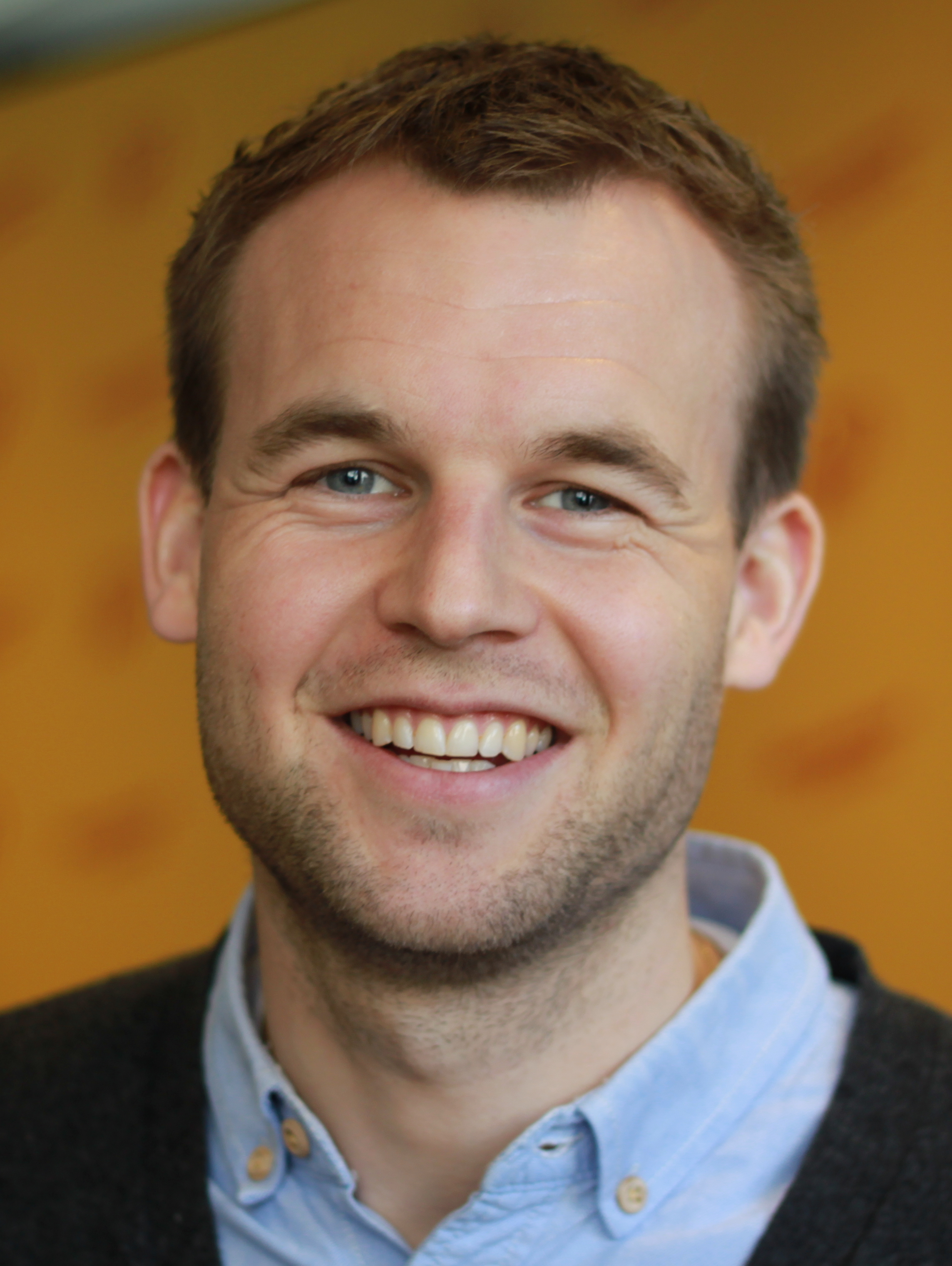
	First party	Second party	Third party
Leader	Jonas Gahr Støre	Erna Solberg	Trygve Slagsvold Vedum
Party	Labour	Conservative	Centre
Leader since	14 June 2014	9 May 2004	7 April 2014
Leader's seat	Oslo	Hordaland	Hedmark
Last election	49 seats, 27.37%	45 seats, 25.04%	19 seats, 10.32%
Seats won	48	36	28
Seat change	▼1	▼9	▲9
Popular vote	783,394	607,316	402,961
Percentage	26.25%	20.35%	13.50%
Swing	▼1.12 pp	▼4.69 pp	▲3.18 pp
	Fourth party	Fifth party	Sixth party
Leader	Sylvi Listhaug	Audun Lysbakken	Bjørnar Moxnes
Party	Progress	Socialist Left	Red
Leader since	8 May 2021	11 March 2012	6 May 2012
Leader's seat	Møre og Romsdal	Hordaland	Oslo
Last election	27 seats, 15.19%	11 seats, 6.02%	1 seat, 2.41%
Seats won	21	13	8
Seat change	▼6	▲2	▲7
Popular vote	346,474	228,063	140,931
Percentage	11.61%	7.64%	4.72%
Swing	▼3.58 pp	▲1.62 pp	▲2.31 pp
	Seventh party	Eighth party	Ninth party
Leader	Guri Melby	Une Bastholm	Kjell Ingolf Ropstad
Party	Liberal	Green	Christian; Democratic
Leader since	26 September 2020	25 April 2020	27 April 2019
Leader's seat	Oslo	Akershus (Note: Member of Storting for Oslo but ran in Akershus and won)	Vest-Agder (Note: Member of Storting for Aust-Agder ran in Aust-Agder and Vest-Agder and Aust-Agder (lost) Vest-Agder (won))
Last election	8 seats, 4.37%	1 seat, 3.24%	8 seats, 4.20%
Seats won	8	3	3
Seat change	0	▲2	▼5
Popular vote	137,433	117,647	113,344
Percentage	4.61%	3.94%	3.80%
Swing	▲0.24 pp	▲0.70 pp	▼0.40 pp
Prime Minister before election
Erna Solberg
Conservative
Elected Prime Minister
Jonas Gahr Støre
Labour

Parliamentary elections were held in Norway on 13 September 2021. All 169 seats in the Norwegian legislature, the Storting, were up for election.

The election was won by a coalition consisting of the social-democratic Labour Party and the agrarian Centre Party that entered into negotiations to form a government. The election also resulted in a majority for the parties that seek to dissolve the unpopular and controversial Viken county. Jonas Gahr Støre's Labour Party retained its position as Norway's largest party and expanded their lead in seats over the Conservatives, despite a slight drop in its share of votes and the loss of one seat. Incumbent Conservative Party prime minister Erna Solberg conceded defeat. Her party ended up with the second-largest number of representatives. Støre aimed to form a majority government with the Centre Party and the Socialist Left Party, but the latter stated they would remain in opposition, citing disagreements over climate and welfare policies, while remaining open to future negotiations and supporting the government on common ground. On 14 October, Støre became prime minister of a minority government, the Støre Cabinet.

== Background ==
=== 2017 parliamentary election and aftermath ===
In the 2017 parliamentary election held on 11 September, Erna Solberg of the Conservatives retained her position as prime minister after four years in power. Her premiership additionally received the support of the Progress Party, the Liberals, and the Christian Democrats, who combined secured 88 of the 169 seats in parliament. The opposition, led by Jonas Gahr Støre and his Labour Party, won 81 seats. Other opposition parties included the Centre Party, Socialist Left, the Greens, and the Red Party.

=== Christian Democratic Party government accession ===
The Christian Democrats voted at a party conference to join Solberg's government on 2 November 2018 and on 16 January 2019, Solberg's Conservatives struck a deal with the Christian Democratic Party. This marked the first time since 1985 that Norway would have a majority government representing right-wing parties in the Storting.

=== Progress Party withdrawal from government ===
On 20 January 2020, the Progress Party decided to withdraw from the government due to a decision by Solberg to repatriate a woman linked to Islamic State and her children back to Norway. Despite this, Solberg said that she and her party would continue to head a minority government, and the other parties in the coalition (the Christian Democrats and the Liberals) have also stated they would continue to serve in it.

== Electoral system ==
The election used party-list proportional representation in nineteen multi-member constituencies. The number of members to be returned from each constituency varies between 4 and 19. To determine the apportionment of the 169 seats amongst the 19 counties, a two-tier formula is used, based on population and geographic size. Each inhabitant counts one point, while each square kilometer counts 1.8 points. Since the last election changes were made to constituency boundaries and new area was used in the apportionment formula.

Boundary changes for 2021
Municipality	From constituency	To constituency	A map of changes to Norway's constituencies
Rømskog	Østfold	Akershus	A map of changes to Norway's constituencies
Hurum	Buskerud	Akershus	A map of changes to Norway's constituencies
Røyken	Buskerud	Akershus	A map of changes to Norway's constituencies
Lunner	Oppland	Akershus	A map of changes to Norway's constituencies
Jevnaker	Oppland	Buskerud	A map of changes to Norway's constituencies
Svelvik	Vestfold	Buskerud	A map of changes to Norway's constituencies
Hornindal	Sogn og Fjordane	Møre og Romsdal	A map of changes to Norway's constituencies
Halsa	Møre og Romsdal	Sør-Trøndelag	A map of changes to Norway's constituencies
Rindal	Møre og Romsdal	Sør-Trøndelag	A map of changes to Norway's constituencies
Leksvik	Nord-Trøndelag	Sør-Trøndelag	A map of changes to Norway's constituencies
Tjeldsund	Nordland	Troms	A map of changes to Norway's constituencies

A total of 150 of the seats are regular district seats. These are awarded based on the election results in each county, and are unaffected by results in other counties. Nineteen of the seats (one for each county) are leveling seats, awarded to parties who win fewer seats than their share of the national popular vote otherwise entitles them to. A modification of the Sainte-Lague method, where the first quotient for each party is calculated using a divisor of 1.4 instead of 1, is used to allocate both the constituency and leveling seats. A party must win 4% of the popular vote in order to win compensation seats but may still win district seats even if it fails to reach this threshold. The system for apportioning seats is biased in favour of rural areas since the area of the county is a factor, but the system of compensation seats reduces the effect this has on final party strength.

Seats by constituency
Constituency	Population (as of 1.1.2020)	Area (km^{2}) (as of 1.1.2020)	Seats	Change since 2017
Østfold	299,447	4,004	9	Steady
Akershus	675,240	5,669	19	▲2
Oslo	693,494	454	20	▲1
Hedmark	197,920	27,398	7	Steady
Oppland	173,465	24,675	6	▼1
Buskerud	266,478	14,920	8	▼1
Vestfold	246,041	2,168	7	Steady
Telemark	173,355	15,298	6	Steady
Aust-Agder	118,273	9,155	4	Steady
Vest-Agder	188,958	7,278	6	Steady
Rogaland	479,892	9,377	14	Steady
Hordaland	528,127	15,438	16	Steady
Sogn og Fjordane	108,404	18,433	4	Steady
Møre og Romsdal	265,238	14,356	8	▼1
Sør-Trøndelag	334,514	20,257	10	Steady
Nord-Trøndelag	134,188	21,944	5	Steady
Nordland	241,235	38,155	9	Steady
Troms	167,839	26,198	6	Steady
Finnmark	75,472	48,631	5	Steady

=== Electoral reform ===
On 21 June 2017, Solberg's Cabinet established a committee tasked with reviewing the electoral system used in Norwegian parliamentary elections. The 17-member committee, which was led by court judge Ørnulf Røhnebæk, published its report on the electoral system on 27 May 2020. The committee agreed that the number of seats should remain at 169. Furthermore, a majority of the committee favoured the retention of the current 19 constituencies, lowering the electoral threshold to 3% and the abolition of the two-tier formula for the apportionment of seats; however, the proposed reforms to the electoral law are planned to be implemented in 2022, meaning that they would only apply from the next parliamentary election in 2025. The reform of the counties and municipalities came into effect on 1 January 2021 and resulted in a reduction in the number of counties from 19 to 11; the 19 constituencies no longer correspond to the county boundaries.

=== Date ===
As the 2017 election was held on 11 September, the 2021 election was to be held on 13 September. According to the Constitution of Norway, parliamentary elections must be held every four years. The Norwegian parliament may not be dissolved before such a parliamentary four-year term has ended, which in practice makes snap elections impossible.

=== Political parties ===
Name		Ideology	Position	Leader	2017 result	
Name		Ideology	Position	Leader	Votes (%)	Seats
Ap	Labour Party; Arbeiderpartiet	Social democracy	Centre-left	Jonas Gahr Støre	27.4%	49 / 169
H	Conservative Party; Høyre	Liberal conservatism	Centre-right	Erna Solberg	25.0%	45 / 169
FrP	Progress Party; Fremskrittspartiet	Conservative liberalism	Right-wing	Sylvi Listhaug	15.2%	27 / 169
Sp	Centre Party; Senterpartiet	Agrarianism	Centre	Trygve Slagsvold Vedum	10.3%	19 / 169
SV	Socialist Left Party; Sosialistisk Venstreparti	Democratic socialism	Left-wing	Audun Lysbakken	6.0%	11 / 169
V	Liberal Party; Venstre	Social liberalism	Centre	Guri Melby	4.4%	8 / 169
KrF	Christian Democratic Party; Kristelig Folkeparti	Christian democracy	Centre to centre-right	Kjell Ingolf Ropstad	4.2%	8 / 169
MDG	Green Party; Miljøpartiet De Grønne	Green politics	Centre-left	Une Aina Bastholm	3.2%	1 / 169
R	Red Party; Rødt	Communism	Left-wing to far-left	Bjørnar Moxnes	2.4%	1 / 169

== Opinion polls ==
There were several websites tracking party support ahead of the election, using somewhat different methods. Below is a plot of the 30-day moving average of relevant opinion polls.

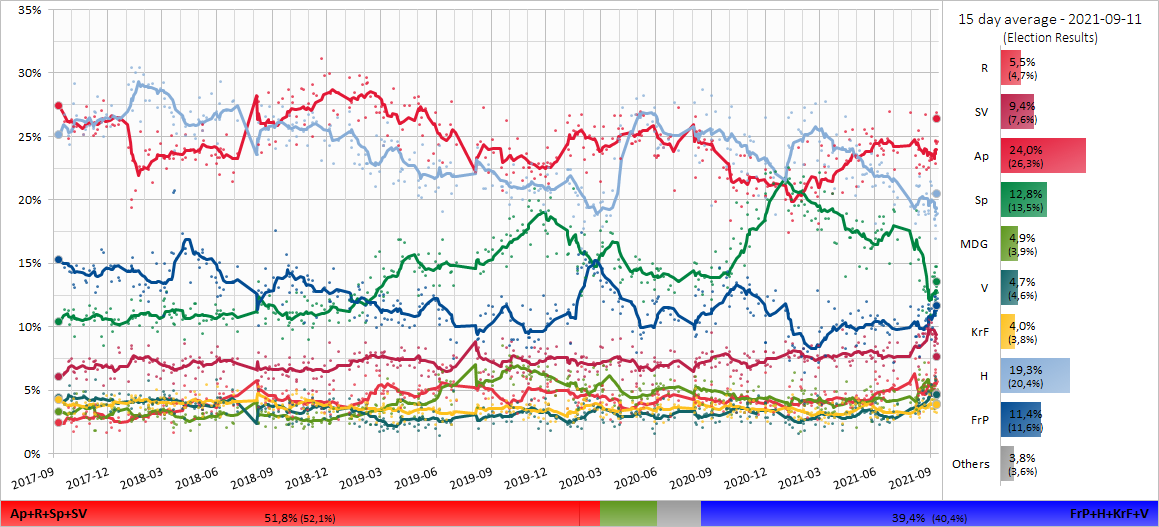

== Debates ==
2021 Norwegian general election debates
Date	Time	Organizers	P Present I Invitee N Non-invitee									
Date	Time	Organizers	Ap	H	Frp	KrF	Sp	V	Sv	R	MdG	Refs
9 August		Civita (think tank)	P Jonas Gahr Støre	P Erna Solberg	N Sylvi Listhaug	N Kjell Ingolf Ropstad	N Trygve Slagsvold Vedum	N Guri Melby	N Audun Lysbakken	N Bjørnar Moxnes	N Une Bastholm	
9 August	20.00	Verdens Gang	P Jonas Gahr Støre	P Erna Solberg	N Sylvi Listhaug	N Kjell Ingolf Ropstad	P Trygve Slagsvold Vedum	N Guri Melby	N Audun Lysbakken	N Bjørnar Moxnes	N Une Bastholm	
16 August	21:20	NRK	P Jonas Gahr Støre	P Erna Solberg	P Sylvi Listhaug	P Kjell Ingolf Ropstad	P Trygve Slagsvold Vedum	P Guri Melby	P Audun Lysbakken	P Bjørnar Moxnes	P Une Bastholm	
31 August		TV 2	P Jonas Gahr Støre	P Erna Solberg	P Sylvi Listhaug	P Kjell Ingolf Ropstad	P Trygve Slagsvold Vedum	P Guri Melby	P Audun Lysbakken	P Bjørnar Moxnes	P Une Bastholm	
2 September	21:20	NRK	P Jonas Gahr Støre	P Erna Solberg	N Sylvi Listhaug	N Kjell Ingolf Ropstad	P Trygve Slagsvold Vedum	N Guri Melby	N Audun Lysbakken	N Bjørnar Moxnes	N Une Bastholm	
8 September		TV 2	P Jonas Gahr Støre	P Erna Solberg	P Sylvi Listhaug	P Kjell Ingolf Ropstad	P Trygve Slagsvold Vedum	P Guri Melby	P Audun Lysbakken	P Bjørnar Moxnes	P Une Bastholm	
9 September	20:00	NRK	P Ingvild Kjerkol, Eva Kristin Hansen	P Linda Hofstad Helleland, Elin Agdestein	P Sivert Bjørnstad	P Øyvind Håbrekke	P Ola Borten Moe, Marit Arnstad	P Jon Gunnes	P Lars Haltbrekken, Siv furunes	P Hege Bae Nyholt	P Ask Ibsen Lindal	
10 September	19:40	NRK	P Jonas Gahr Støre	P Erna Solberg	P Sylvi Listhaug	P Kjell Ingolf Ropstad	P Trygve Slagsvold Vedum	P Guri Melby	P Audun Lysbakken	P Bjørnar Moxnes	P Une Bastholm	

== Results ==
Party	Votes	%	Seats	+/–
Labour Party	783,394	26.25	48	–1
Conservative Party	607,316	20.35	36	–9
Centre Party	402,961	13.50	28	+9
Progress Party	346,474	11.61	21	–6
Socialist Left Party	228,063	7.64	13	+2
Red Party	140,931	4.72	8	+7
Liberal Party	137,433	4.61	8	0
Green Party	117,647	3.94	3	+2
Christian Democratic Party	113,344	3.80	3	–5
Democrats in Norway	34,068	1.14	0	0
Pensioners' Party	19,006	0.64	0	0
The Christians	10,448	0.35	0	0
Industry and Business Party	10,031	0.34	0	New
Center Party	7,836	0.26	0	New
Health Party	6,490	0.22	0	0
Patient Focus	4,950	0.17	1	New
Capitalist Party	4,520	0.15	0	0
People's Action No to More Road Tolls	3,435	0.12	0	New
Alliance – Alternative for Norway	2,489	0.08	0	0
Pirate Party	2,308	0.08	0	0
Communist Party of Norway	301	0.01	0	0
Feminist Initiative	275	0.01	0	0
Generation Party	199	0.01	0	New
Coastal Party	171	0.01	0	0
Save Nature	97	0.00	0	New
Total	2,984,187	100.00	169	0
Valid votes	2,984,187	99.36		
Invalid/blank votes	19,103	0.64		
Total votes	3,003,290	100.00		
Registered voters/turnout	3,891,736	77.17		
Source: valgresultat.no

=== Voter demographics ===
Cohort	Percentage of cohort voting for									
Cohort	Ap	H	Sp	FrP	Sv	R	V	MDG	KrF	Others
Total vote	26.25%	20.35%	13.50%	11.61%	7.64%	4.72%	4.61%	3.94%	3.80%	2.18%
Gender
Females	27.5%	19.6%	12.9%	8.2%	10.7%	5.4%	5.2%	3.7%	3.9%	2.9%
Males	25%	21.1%	14.1%	14.8%	5%	4.1%	4%	4.1%	3.6%	4.2%
Age
18–30 years old	15.1%	14.5%	13.2%	12.6%	17.6%	5%	9.4%	10.7%	1.3%	0.6%
30–59 years old	27.1%	20%	14.5%	11%	6.3%	4.7%	4.8%	3.5%	4%	3.1%
60 years old and older	29.4%	23.6%	12.2%	12.2%	5.6%	4.8%	2.1%	1.9%	4.5%	3.7%
Work
Low income	23.6%	13.9%	16.4%	15%	9.4%	6.7%	3.6%	3.9%	2.2%	5.3%
Average income	30.6%	19.2%	11.9%	11.2%	7%	4.1%	3.4%	4.1%	5.1%	3.4%
High income	23.7%	28.5%	12.3%	8.7%	6.4%	3.6%	7%	4.2%	3.4%	0.2%
Education
Primary school	29.7%	13.7%	18.3%	21.1%	3.4%	2.9%	1.1%	1.7%	1.7%	6.4%
High school	21.1%	23.8%	15.2%	14.9%	6%	5.4%	3.3%	3%	3.3%	4%
University/college	27.9%	20.3%	11.5%	6.8%	10%	5.1%	6.3%	5.3%	4.3%	2.5%
Source: Norwegian Institute for Social Research

=== By electoral district ===
Below is the percentage of vote each party earned in each electoral district.

Electoral district	Ap	H	Sp	Frp	SV	R	V	MDG	KrF	PF
Østfold	30.6	18.7	14.2	12.8	5.9	4.5	2.8	2.9	3.3	–
Akershus	26.0	27.7	8.9	10.6	6.6	3.9	6.6	4.6	2.1	–
Oslo	23.0	23.6	3.1	6.0	13.3	8.3	10.0	8.5	1.8	–
Hedmark	33.3	10.6	28.3	8.5	6.7	3.3	2.2	2.0	1.6	–
Oppland	35.2	12.5	26.2	8.6	5.3	3.7	2.3	2.2	1.6	–
Buskerud	28.5	22.1	16.2	12.3	5.5	3.4	3.5	2.9	2.3	–
Vestfold	27.0	25.2	10.0	12.5	6.0	4.4	4.0	3.8	3.5	–
Telemark	31.0	15.7	16.6	12.8	5.9	4.6	2.2	2.7	4.5	–
Aust-Agder	24.6	20.3	13.6	13.4	5.4	3.7	3.1	2.9	8.8	–
Vest-Agder	20.8	21.4	10.4	13.3	5.2	3.2	3.5	3.0	13.9	–
Rogaland	22.4	24.0	10.5	16.9	4.9	3.7	3.4	2.4	8.1	–
Hordaland	22.8	24.6	9.9	12.7	8.8	4.6	4.2	3.8	4.9	–
Sogn og Fjordane	26.5	13.9	28.7	9.4	5.6	4.0	3.3	2.3	3.9	–
Møre og Romsdal	20.2	16.3	17.6	22.3	6.1	3.3	2.8	2.3	5.4	–
Sør-Trøndelag	30.0	16.5	15.1	8.7	9.0	5.6	4.3	4.7	2.2	–
Nord-Trøndelag	33.7	10.6	29.1	8.1	5.5	3.9	2.0	1.7	2.3	–
Nordland	29.0	15.4	21.3	12.3	6.9	5.4	2.4	2.2	2.0	–
Troms	27.2	13.7	19.1	14.1	10.6	4.7	2.4	2.9	2.2	–
Finnmark	31.6	6.8	18.3	10.9	5.9	4.9	1.4	2.2	1.6	12.7
Total	26.3	20.5	13.6	11.7	7.5	4.7	4.5	3.8	3.8	0.2

Below is the number of district seats for each party, with the party winning the most votes coloured in. The party earning the leveling seat in each district is marked by (*).

Electoral district	AP	H	Sp	Frp	SV	R	V	MDG	KrF	PF	Total
Østfold	3	2	2	1	1*	–	–	–	–	–	9
Akershus	5	6*	2	2	1	1	1	1	–	–	19
Oslo	4	5	–	1	3	2	3*	2	–	–	20
Hedmark	3	1	2	1*	–	–	–	–	–	–	7
Oppland	2	1	2	1*	–	–	–	–	–	–	6
Buskerud	3	2	1	1	1*	–	–	–	–	–	8
Vestfold	2	2	1	1	1*	–	–	–	–	–	7
Telemark	2	1	1	1	–	1*	–	–	–	–	6
Aust-Agder	1	1	1	1*	–	–	–	–	–	–	4
Vest-Agder	1	1	1	1	–	–	1*	–	1	–	6
Rogaland	3	4	2	2	1	1*	–	–	1	–	14
Hordaland	4	4	2	2	1	1	1*	–	1	–	16
Sogn og Fjordane	1	1	1	–	–	–	1*	–	–	–	4
Møre og Romsdal	2	1	2	2	1*	–	–	–	–	–	8
Sør-Trøndelag	3	2	2	1	1	1*	–	–	–	–	10
Nord-Trøndelag	2	–	2	–	–	–	1*	–	–	–	5
Nordland	3	1	2	1	1	1*	–	–	–	–	9
Troms	2	1	1	1	1*	–	–	–	–	–	6
Finnmark	2	–	1	1*	–	–	–	–	–	1	5
Total	48	36	28	21	13	8	8	3	3	1	169

=== By municipality ===
Labour

Conservative

Centre

Progress

Socialist Left

Red

Liberal

Green

Christian Democratic

Patient Focus

== Aftermath ==
After the announcement of the results, Conservative Party prime minister Erna Solberg conceded defeat to opposition leader Jonas Gahr Støre. Solberg thanked her supporters and said she was proud of the government's achievements throughout eight years of centre-right rule. On her way to the podium to deliver her concession speech, Solberg told reporters that she had called Jonas Gahr Støre, the head of the Labour Party, to congratulate him on his victory. Addressing a crowd shortly after Solberg conceded, Støre said: "We have waited, we have hoped and worked so hard, and now we can finally say, we did it."

=== International reactions ===
International news outlets commented that following the elections, all five Nordic countries, namely Denmark, Finland, Iceland, Norway, and Sweden, now had left-leaning prime ministers or were to be ruled by left-wing-led governments simultaneously for the first time since 1959. (Note: The government in Iceland has been headed by a centre-left–centre-right coalition, which was confirmed in November 2021, and is headed by left-leaning prime minister Katrín Jakobsdóttir since 2017.)

=== Disestablishment of Viken ===
The parties that seek to dissolve the unpopular and controversial Viken county, formed in 2020 by the forced merger of Akershus, Buskerud, and Østfold, won a majority, and as a result the county executive initiated the formal process to dissolve the county and divide it back into its original constituent counties.

=== Government formation ===
Government pre-negotiations took place at Hurdalsjøen Hotel in Hurdal municipality after Trygve Slagsvold Vedum and the Centre Party opted for pre-negotiations with the Socialist Left Party before subsequent government negotiations. These negotiations began on 23 September and lasted until 29 September (excluding the weekend), when the Socialist Left Party, led by Audun Lysbakken, withdrew from negotiations citing their disagreement with the Labour Party and the Centre Party, in particular over issues of petroleum and welfare. To the press, he reassured that the party was open for future negotiations and would be going into opposition for the time being. At a press conference later that day, along with Vedum, Støre announced that the Labour Party and the Centre Party had started negotiations for a minority government. On 8 October, Støre and Vedum announced that the new government's platform (Hurdalsplattformen) would be presented on 13 October and that they were ready to form a government, which was formalized for 14 October, and the Støre Cabinet was formed that day.

As a minority coalition, the government has to rely on opposition parties to pass budget motions. For both the 2021 and 2022 budgets, the government was able to come to an agreement with the Socialist Left Party.

== Donations ==
According to Statistisk sentralbyrå, a total of 94.98 million NOK in campaign contributions was raised by all political parties in 2021.

Party	Donations (NOK)
Labour Party	31,277,077
Conservative Party	20,679,650
Socialist Left Party	12,951,033
Centre Party	7,369,400
Progress Party	5,563,750
Green Party	4,507,123
Christian Democratic Party	4,275,500
Liberal Party	3,954,298
Red Party	2,929,285

== See also ==
- 2021 Icelandic parliamentary election
- 2021 Norwegian Sámi parliamentary election
