= Knut Storberget =

Norwegian lawyer and politician

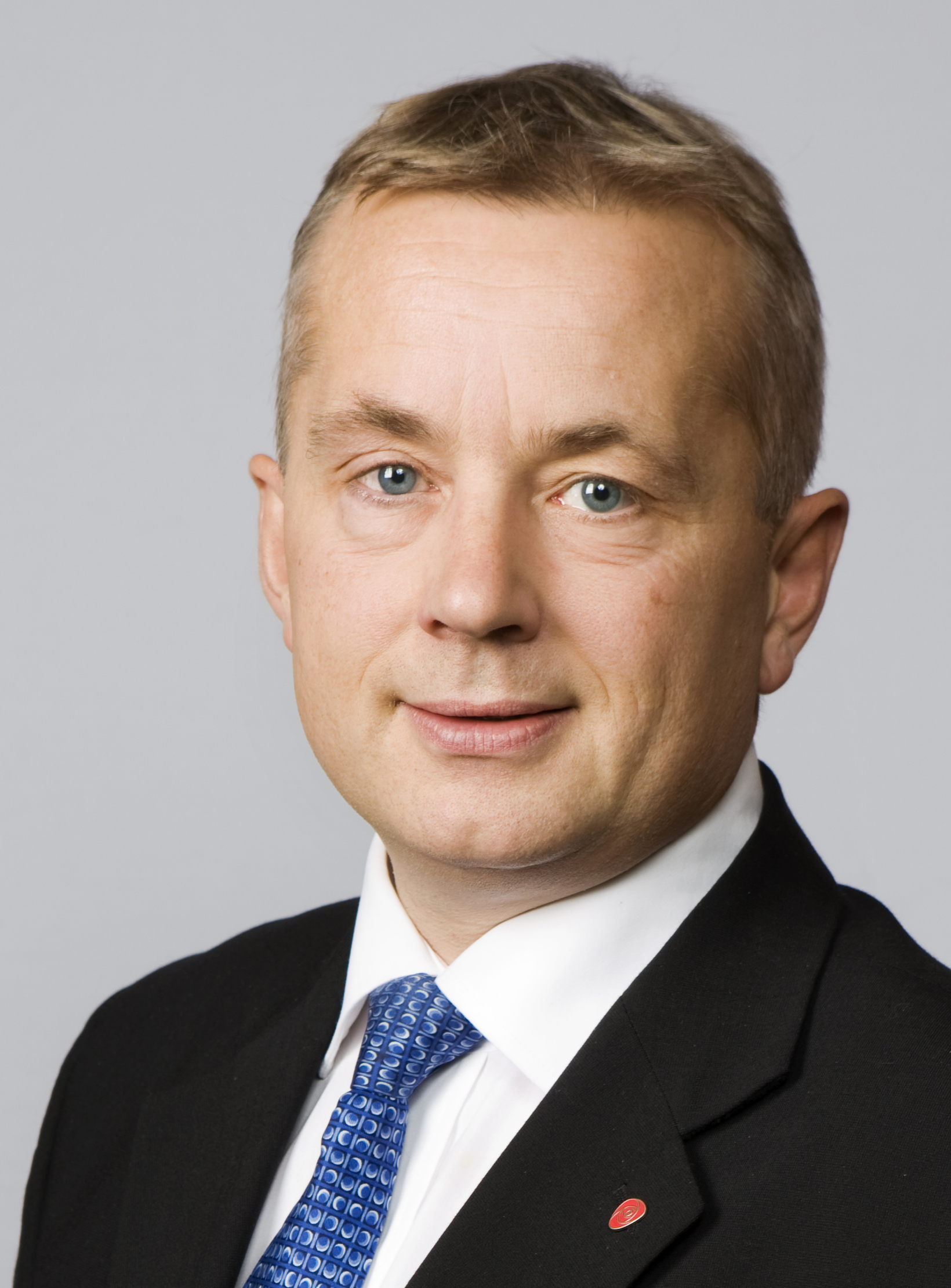

County Governor of Innlandet
- Incumbent
- Assumed office 1 January 2019
- Monarch: Harald V
- Prime Minister: Erna Solberg; Jonas Gahr Støre
- Preceded by: Office established (counties merged)

Minister of Justice and the Police
- In office 17 October 2005 – 11 November 2011
- Prime Minister: Jens Stoltenberg
- Preceded by: Odd Einar Dørum
- Succeeded by: Grete Faremo

Member of the Storting
- In office 1 October 2001 – 30 September 2017
- Deputy: Thomas Breen; Thor Lillehovde
- Constituency: Hedmark

Deputy Member of the Storting
- In office 1 October 1993 – 30 September 2001
- Constituency: Hedmark

Personal details
- Born: 6 October 1964 (age 61) Elverum, Hedmark, Norway
- Party: Labour
- Education: University of Oslo
- Occupation: Politician
- Profession: Barrister

Knut Storberget (born 6 October 1964) is a Norwegian lawyer and politician for the Labour Party. He is currently serving as the county governor of Innlandet since 2019. He previously served as Minister of Justice under Jens Stoltenberg from 2005 to 2011. He was also a member of parliament for Hedmark from 2001 to 2017, and deputy member for the same constituency from 1993 to 2001.

== Early life and education ==
Storberget was born in the small town of Elverum in Hedmark county on 6 October 1964. The son of forester Lars Storberget (1921–1992) and nurse Marit Drangsholt-Salvesen (1923–1992). After completing high school, he attended the University of Oslo, graduating first in 1985, receiving an associate degree in Political science, he later received a law degree after completing law school at the same university in 1990.

== Political career ==
From 1992 to 2002 he worked as an attorney-at-law, participating in several high-profile cases, including at the supreme court. He was namely a defense attorney. On the local level he was a member of Elverum municipal council for the Labour party from 1991 to 1999.

=== Parliament ===
He was first elected to the Norwegian Parliament from Hedmark in 2001, and was re-elected on three occasions. He had previously served as a deputy representative during the terms 1993–1997 and 1997–2001. In October 2005 he was appointed Minister of Justice and the Police in the second cabinet Stoltenberg. His seat in parliament was taken by Thomas Breen between 2005 and 2009, and by Thor Lillehovde between 2009 and 2011.

After his resignation as minister, Storberget signaled his intention to run for reelection as member of parliament for his native Hedmark county. It had been suggested that his chance for party nomination is in jeopardy due to his support for the controversial Temporary and Agency Workers Directive. The directive is vehemently opposed by the labor unions which have significant influence over the nomination of Labour party candidates. On 1 December 2012, he was however renominated with acclamation and got the top spot on Hedmark Labour Partys's ballot for the 2013 election.

On 14 June 2016, Storberget announced that he would not be seeking re-election in the 2017 election. On Facebook, he stated that "new forces just step in".

=== Minister of Justice and the Police ===
A long-time proponent of reforming the Norwegian policy towards narcotics and drug use, he declared in June 2010 that he no longer wants to punish drug use altogether. Using Portugal as an example of the positive effects of decriminalization of narcotics.

In April 2008, he issued an apology to the family of Fritz Moen, who had been wrongfully convicted of two murders and died three years earlier. Storberget stated: "I would like to offer an unreserved apology and regret to Fritz Moen and those who knew him and were close to him, for the injustice he was subjected to".

Storberget is also a key supporter of criminal rehabilitation, having built Norway's most modern prison in Halden in 2009. The prison facility included tiled bathrooms and flat-screen TV-sets in each cell. The project received criticism for being a "luxury hotel" for criminals. Storberget rebuked the critics by declaring the prison "a beacon of light" and that Norway does not put prisoners "into cold dungeons".

He also declared to have eradicated the "incarceration queue" of convicts who is waiting to serve time in prison due to prisons being full. He attributes this to reforms making the judicial system more efficient, as well as the construction of more prisons. However the Opposition claimed it is mainly caused by more early releases of convicts and thus more free cells in prison. A year later, the queue was reported to have again doubled.

=== County Governor of Innlandet ===
On 21 June 2017, he was nominated to become the first county governor of Innlandet county. He assumed office on 1 January 2019, a year before Hedmark and Oppland were officially merged to become Innlandet. The government announced in May 2024 that they would nominate Storberget for a second six-year-term as county governor.

In October 2024, the Ministry of Digitalisation and Public Governance were informed of a complaint filed against Storberget after he had started a relationship with a younger employee at the County Governor's office for the last four years. Later the same month, it was revealed that the ministry had altered the information they received and added to their lists ten days overdue, removed the original sender and altered the subject of the complaint. These actions regarding the case can be considered illegal according to law experts. Storberget was issued a written warning by the Minister of Digitalisation and Public Governance, Karianne Tung, in February 2025 upon the investigation's conclusion.

== Controversies ==
During Storberget's six years as cabinet minister, numerous controversies has erupted. Late political scholar Hanne Marthe Narud attributed the disproportional number of controversies to Storbergets poor planning skills.

=== The Hijab affair ===
In February 2009 the National Police Directorate recommended to Storberget, who was then Minister of Justice and the Police, that the religious garment known as Hijab should be allowed used as a part of the standard police uniform. A press release from Storberget later confirmed that the new rules would be applied. The decision caused a storm of criticism and brought fierce reactions from the National Police Unions, the opposition Conservative, Progress, Centre parties and members of the government coalition.

In the immediate aftermath, the press release was suddenly removed from the Justice department's website, and Storberget denied having taken a decision on the matter. Prime minister Jens Stoltenberg admitted to the Storting that the issue was not "explored" sufficiently. The issue was canceled altogether by Storberget on 20 February.

During a press conference regarding the matter, journalists challenged Storberget as to whether he himself had made the decisions on the issue. Facing extreme pressure to resign, he refused to comment on who was responsible and how it could have happened, uttering the word "prosess" (lit: Process) almost forty times during the thirty-minute session. Days later he was briefly hospitalized after experiencing a "Medical episode". Analysts have noted that as Storberget was on vacation at the time, he probably did not know about the proposal or the decision to approve it, which was authored by his state secretaries Astri Aas-Hansen and Hadia Tajik. However the allegations against Aas-Hansen and Tajik have never been confirmed, and other newspapers have reported that the Minister of Justice himself may have authored the decision, leaving the two with the blame when the storm came.

=== Allegations of coercion ===
A lawyer for victims of the Utøya massacre, Mette Yvonne Larsen, was telephoned by Storberget on 19 August 2011, and allegedly the minister asked her to reduce her criticism (after she publicly criticized some of actions by police during and after the massacre, and after having asked, on behalf of her clients, why police did not arrive earlier to the scene of the massacre, and asked why there was no helicopter [belonging to the Government] on standby). Storberget said that he could not remember (having called the lawyer and asking her to soften her criticism (dempe kritikken).

=== Resignation ===
Facing mounting pressure in the aftermath of the 2011 Norway attacks over the state of the police and security, Storberget announced his resignation. He declared that six years as justice minister was sufficient and that he wished to focus his attention on remaining in parliament and his family. He was replaced by defense minister Grete Faremo.

== Bibliography ==
- Storberget, Knut: Miscellaneous articles
- Storberget, Knut: Legal control of alcohol policy decisions, Oslo 1993
- Storberget, Knut: Legal and alcohol policy, Oslo 1995
- Storberget, Knut: "The bear sleeps", Aschehoug Oslo 2007

Political offices
Preceded by Odd Einar Dørum	Minister of Justice and the Police; 2005–2011	Succeeded by Grete Faremo
Civic offices
New office	County Governor of Innlandet; 2019–present	Incumbent
