= Ahmed Al Meraikhi =

Ahmed Al Meraikhi is the United Nations Secretary-General's Humanitarian Envoy. Prior to this appointment of 8 December 2016 by United Nations Secretary-General Ban Ki-moon, Mr. Al Meraikhi was an Ambassador for the Ministry of Foreign Affairs of Qatar. As Humanitarian Envoy, Mr. Al Meraikhi will work closely with the United Nations Under-Secretary-General for Humanitarian Affairs in Qatar, the Persian Gulf region and beyond.

== Biographical information ==
Al Meraikhi's experience includes work with the Qatari Ministry of Foreign Affairs as an Ambassador.

Prior to his appointment, Al-Meraikhi joined the UN CERF-Advisory Group. He was appointed to CERF's advisory committee. Members of the advisory group represent themselves and not their country. Other group members included Susan Eckey of Norway, Susanna Moorehead from the UK, Ugandan Julius Oketta, Yukie Osa from Japan and Croatian Nancy Butijer. He was elected to be the Vice-Chair in October 2015. Al-Meraikhi has served as Vice President of the Qatar Regulatory Authority for Charitable Activity since 2014. He simultaneously served as the Founding Director of the International Development Department in the Ministry of Foreign Affairs of Qatar (2010-2016) and had served as Director General of the Qatar Development Fund (2010-2015).

In 2008, Al-Meraikhi began his association with charitable associations; serving as Vice Chairman of the Qatar Coordination Committee for Charity Associations (2008) whose primary objective was to assist in developing Qatari civil society. He still serves as a member of the Executive Committee for the Education Above All Foundation (since 2011) and continues to serve as Vice Chairman for the Standing Committee for the rescue and relief work and humanitarian assistance in the affected areas of sisterly and friendly countries (since 2010).

He holds a master's degree and Doctorate from Sheffield Hallam University in the United Kingdom.
