= Council of State (Norway) =

Executive branch of Norway's government

The Council of State (Norwegian: Statsrådet) is a formal body composed of the most senior government ministers chosen by the prime minister of Norway, and functions as the collective decision-making organ constituting the executive branch of Norway. The council simultaneously plays the role of privy council as well as government cabinet.

With the exception of the prime minister and the minister of foreign affairs, who retain their ministerial ranking in their own right, all the other members of the cabinet concurrently hold the position of statsråd, meaning Councillor of State, and that of chief of the various departments, not formally being considered 'ministers', although commonly addressed as such. The cabinet normally convenes every week, usually on Fridays at 11:00 a.m. at the Royal Palace, Oslo, and is presided over by the monarch.

== Constitutional basis ==
Under the 1814 Constitution of Norway, the third-oldest national Constitution still in operation (after the constitution of San Marino and US Constitution), the King is the head of the executive branch of Norway. However, historical developments such as the introduction of parliamentarism in 1884 and evolving constitutional tradition have altered the King's role, meaning that the Prime Minister, holding the leadership of a political party enjoying electoral support, is the de facto head of government. Accordingly, when Article 3 of the Constitution reads, "The Executive Power is vested in the King", this nowadays reflects the powers conferred on the elected government, operating through the Council of State and headed by the Prime Minister.

The parliamentary system of Norway entails that the Cabinet must not have Parliament against it, and that the appointment by the King is a formality. The members making up the Council of State require the confidence of the Norwegian legislative body, known as the Storting. In practice, the monarch will ask the leader of a parliamentary block that has a majority in the Storting to form a government. After elections resulting in no clear majority to any party or coalition, the leader of the party most likely to be able to form a government is appointed Prime Minister.

The fact that the original wording of the Constitution has not been modified to reflect contemporary practice, is a testimony to the widespread conservative sentiments shared across the political aisle that extensive constitutional revision should be avoided. In practice, this means that the function, authority and mandate of the Council of State is heavily influenced by long-standing conventions.

The Council of State is established by the following article of the Constitution, stating that

The King himself chooses a Council from among Norwegian citizens who are entitled to vote. This Council shall consist of a Prime Minister and at least seven other Members.

The King apportions the business among the Members of the Council of State as he deems appropriate. Under extraordinary circumstances, besides the ordinary Members of the Council of State, the King may summon other Norwegian citizens, although no Members of the Storting, to take a seat in the Council of State.

Husband and wife, parent and child or two siblings may never sit at the same time in the Council of State.

— Constitution of Norway

== Functions and mandate ==
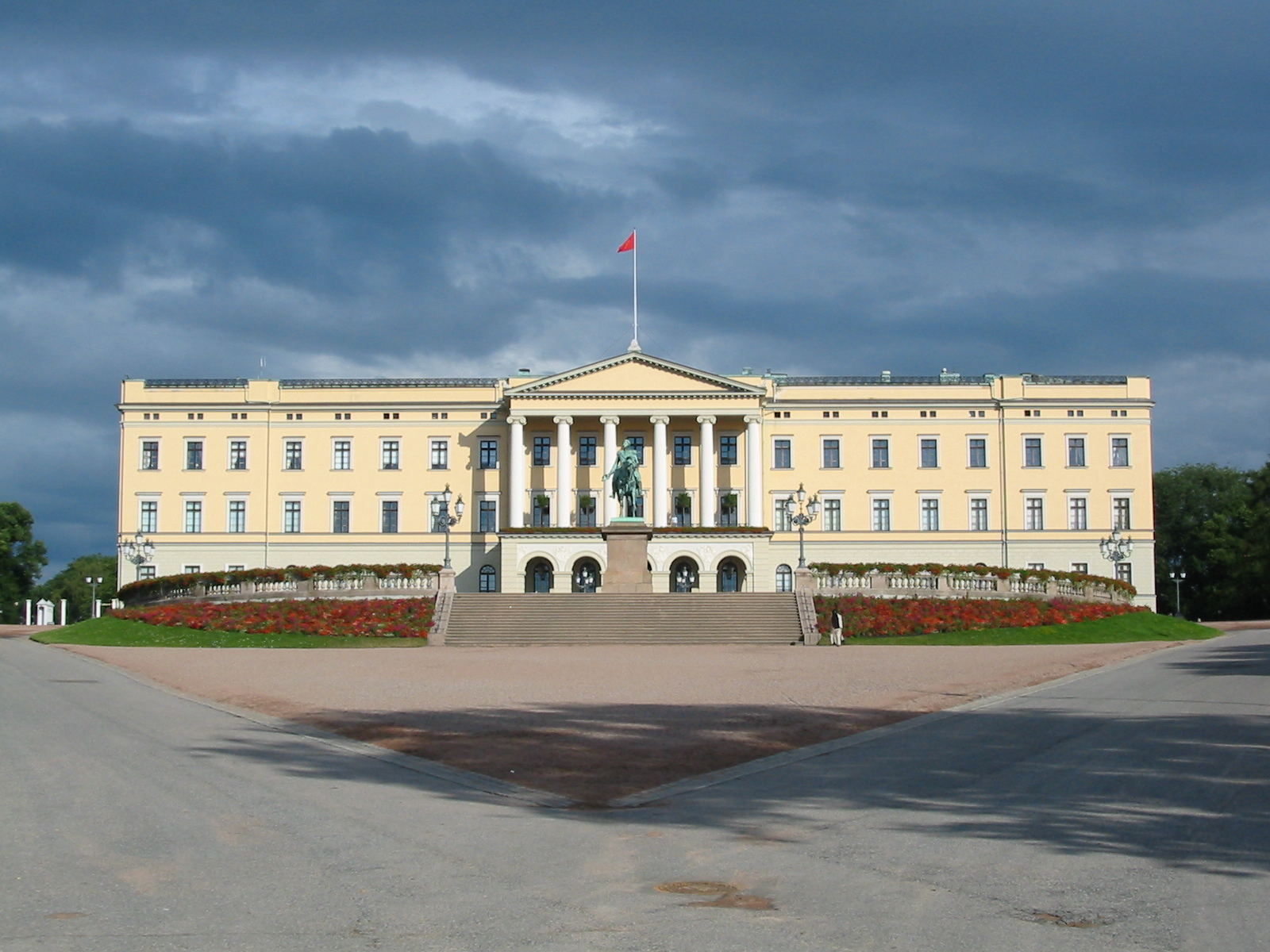
The council meets in the Royal Palace, Oslo

The Council of State convenes to formally make decisions on matters of State, passing so-called Royal Resolutions (Norwegian: Kongelige resolusjoner) or Orders in Council. Formally, the Royal Resolutions themselves are the King's decisions, but are practically those of the government. However, they require the contra-signature of the Prime Minister, or, in cases relating to military command, of the Minister of Defence in order to be valid. Later, entire records from the proceedings of the Council of State is signed by all its members. This is done in order to remove all personal responsibility on part of the King, in keeping with Article 5 of the Constitution, which states that, "The King's person is sacred; he cannot be censured or accused. The responsibility rests with his Council". Another feature of this system is that the King, when having sanctioned a decision, is referred to as King-in-Council (Norwegian: Kongen i statsråd), meaning the King as well as his council.

According to the Constitution, certain cases, such as appointments and dismissals of higher office, pardons, provisional measures, church ordinances and ratifications of treaties must be administered by the Council of State. Whilst not prescribed in the Constitution, the signing of bills and other regulations into law is the most important feature of the work being conducted during sessions of the Council of State.

== Duty of remonstrance ==
Article 30 of the Norwegian Constitution states that any member of the Council of State, if he or she is of the opinion that the "King's decision conflicts with the form of government or the laws of the Realm" is bound by a "duty to make strong remonstrances against it, as well as to enter his opinion in the records." The Article continues by stating that a Member who has not voiced such objections is liable of impeachment by the Storting should a decision made in the Council of State later be found unlawful. For the same reason, the aforesaid Article prescribes that all of the decisions made in the Council of State shall be put down in official records.

== Requirements of membership ==
Whilst most members of the Cabinet originate from within the Storting and will have their seats deputised during their time in office, being Member of Parliament is not a requirement. However, since the introduction of parliamentarism in 1884, all members of the Cabinet must have the express support of the legislature. In addition, they must hold Norwegian citizenship and be eligible to vote, meaning that they have attained the age of 18. Until a 2012 amendment, there was a requirement that a majority of the members had to be affiliated with the Church of Norway, the national state church. When church matters are on the table, all members of the Cabinet not registered with the Church would not be in attendance.

== Order of precedence and succession ==
There is no official order of succession to the premiership of Norway, but the Minister of Foreign Affairs has traditionally been regarded as akin to Deputy Prime Minister, although no such title officially exists. The King established on 1 July 1993 an Order of precedence to direct seating and ranking on formal occasions. Here, the Minister of Finance enjoys the foremost rank after the Prime Minister, with the Minister of Foreign Affairs only coming in third, behind the minister of Agriculture and Food.

== Current composition ==
Ministry	Position	Incumbent	Image	In office since
Office of the Prime Minister; Statsministerens kontor	Prime Minister statsminister	Jonas Gahr Støre		14 October 2021
Ministry of Labour and Social Inclusion; Arbeids- og inkluderingsdepartementet	Minister of Labour and Social Inclusion arbeids- og inkluderingsminister	Kjersti Stenseng		16 September 2025
Ministry of Children and Families; Barne- og familiedepartementet	Minister of Children and Families barne- og familieminister	Lene Vågslid		4 February 2025
Ministry of Digitalisation and Public Governance; Digitaliserings- og forvaltningsdepartementet	Minister of Digitalisation and Public Governance digitaliserings- og forvaltningsminister	Karianne Oldernes Tung		16 October 2023
Ministry of Energy; Energidepartementet	Minister of Energy energiminister	Terje Aasland		7 March 2022
Ministry of Finance; Finansdepartementet	Minister of Finance finansminister	Jens Stoltenberg		4 February 2025
Ministry of Defence; Forsvarsdepartementet	Minister of Defence forsvarsminister	Tore Onshuus Sandvik		4 February 2025
Ministry of Health and Care Services; Helse- og omsorgsdepartementet	Minister of Health and Care Services helse- og omsorgsminister	Jan Christian Vestre		19 April 2024
Ministry of Justice and Public Security; Justis- og beredskapsdepartementet	Minister of Justice and Public Security justis- og beredskapsminister	Astri Aas-Hansen		4 February 2025
Ministry of Climate and Environment; Klima- og miljødepartementet	Minister of Climate and Environment klima- og miljøminister	Andreas Bjelland Eriksen		16 October 2023
Ministry of Local Government and Regional Development; Kommunal- og distriktsdepartementet	Minister of Local Government and Regional Development kommunal- og distriktsminister	Bjørnar Selnes Skjæran		16 September 2025
Ministry of Culture and Equality; Kultur- og likestillingsdepartementet	Minister of Culture and Equality kultur- og likestillingsminister	Lubna Jaffery		28 June 2023
Ministry of Education and Research; Kunnskapsdepartementet	Minister of Education kunnskapsminister	Kari Nessa Nordtun		16 October 2023
Ministry of Education and Research; Kunnskapsdepartementet	Minister of Research and Higher Education forsknings- og høyere utdanningsminister forskings- og høgare utdanningsminister	Sigrun Gjerløw Aasland		4 Februar 2025
Ministry of Agriculture and Food; Landbruks- og matdepartementet	Minister of Agriculture and Food landbruks- og matminister	Nils Kristen Sandtrøen		4 February 2025
Ministry of Trade, Industry and Fisheries; Nærings- og fiskeridepartementet	Minister of Trade and Industry næringsminister	Cecilie Myrseth		19 April 2024
Ministry of Trade, Industry and Fisheries; Nærings- og fiskeridepartementet	Minister of Fisheries and Ocean Policy fiskeri- og havminister	Marianne Sivertsen Næss		19 April 2024
Ministry of Transport; Samferdselsdepartementet	Minister of Transport samferdselsminister	Jon-Ivar Nygård		14 October 2021
Ministry of Foreign Affairs; Utenriksdepartementet; Utanriksdepartementet	Minister of Foreign Affairs utenriksminister utanriksminister	Espen Barth Eide		16 October 2023
Ministry of Foreign Affairs; Utenriksdepartementet; Utanriksdepartementet	Minister of International Development utviklingsminister	Åsmund Grøver Aukrust		4 February 2025
