= Linda Hofstad Helleland =

Norwegian politician (born 1977)

Linda Cathrine Hofstad Helleland
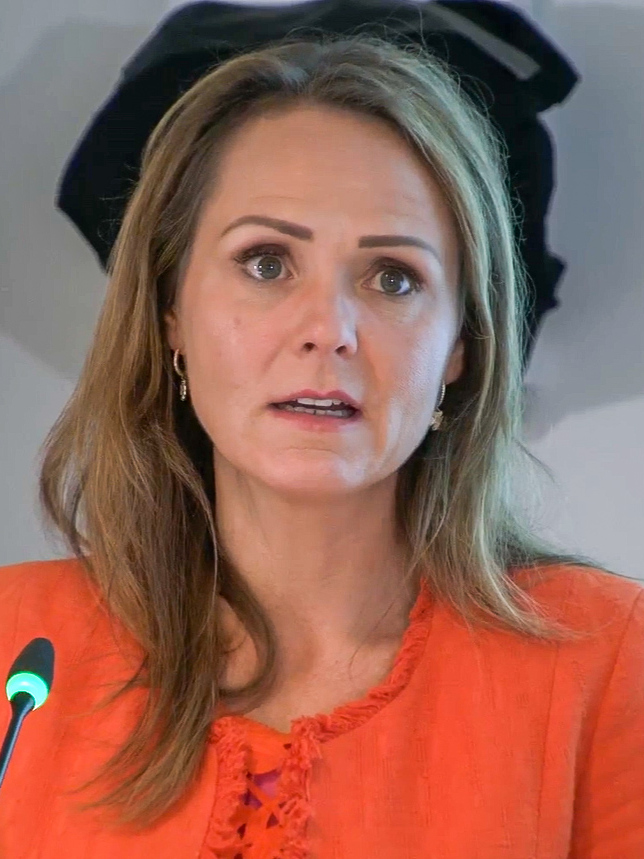
- Helleland in 2020

Minister of Regional Development and Digitalisation
- In office 24 January 2020 – 14 October 2021
- Prime Minister: Erna Solberg
- Preceded by: Nikolai Astrup
- Succeeded by: Karianne Tung (2023)

Minister of Children and Equality
- In office 17 January 2018 – 22 January 2019
- Prime Minister: Erna Solberg
- Preceded by: Solveig Horne
- Succeeded by: Kjell Ingolf Ropstad

Minister of Culture
- In office 16 December 2015 – 17 January 2018
- Prime Minister: Erna Solberg
- Preceded by: Thorhild Widvey
- Succeeded by: Trine Skei Grande

Vice President of WADA
- In office 20 November 2016 – 31 December 2019
- President: Craig Reedie
- Preceded by: Makhenkesi Stofile
- Succeeded by: Yang Yang

Personal details
- Born: 26 August 1977 (age 48) Klæbu Municipality, Sør-Trøndelag, Norway
- Party: Conservative
- Spouse: Trond Helleland (m. 2006)
- Children: 2

Linda Cathrine Hofstad Helleland (born 26 August 1977 in Klæbu Municipality) is a Norwegian career politician for the Conservative Party. She held several ministerial positions in Erna Solberg's government between 2015 and 2021, with a break between 2019 and 2021. She also served as Vice President of the World Anti-Doping Association from 2016 to 2019. In parliament, she has represented Sør-Trøndelag since 2009, and been a deputy representative between 2001 and 2009. Her husband is politician Tronn Helleland.

== Political career ==
=== Parliament ===
She served as a deputy representative in the Norwegian Parliament from Sør-Trøndelag between 2001 and 2009. During the entire first term she deputised for Børge Brende, who was appointed to the second cabinet Bondevik. She was elected as a regular representative in 2009 and has been re-elected since. While serving in government between 2015 and 2019, Torhild Aarbergsbotten and Guro Angell Gimse deputised for her. Gimse did so again when Helleland was in government between 2020 and 2021.

In parliament, she sat in the Standing Committee on Justice between 2001 and 2005. Between 2009 and 2013, she sat on the Standing Committee on Family and Cultural Affairs. That same year, she joined the Standing Committee on Transport and Communications, which she also led until her 2015 ministerial appointment. After returning to parliament in 2019, she joined the Standing Committee on Business and Industry, which she also rejoined following her ministerial appointment between 2020 and 2021. In 2021, she also became her party's spokesperson for business and industry.

In October 2023, she announced that she wouldn't seek re-election at the 2025 election.

=== Local politics ===
Helleland was a member of the municipal council of Trondheim Municipality from 1999 to 2001.

=== Minister of Culture ===
Helleland was appointed minister of culture in a cabinet reshuffle on 16 December 2015.

As minister of culture, she oversaw the government's first culture message to Parliament in over 14 years, and the separation between the Church of Norway and the state, which saw the church becoming a separate entity rather than an agency subjected to the state.

=== Minister of Children and Equality ===
After the Liberal Party joined the Solberg cabinet on 17 January 2018, Helleland was appointed minister of children and equality.

During her tenure, she faced criticism for not taking part in a BBC documentary about the Norwegian Child Welfare Services, which she later argued was because she was in no position to comment on individual cases. She further championed them as a leading example in taking care of children who has been victim to violence and would be an ideal model for other countries in years to come.

In early 2019 she received the Norwegian Board of Health Supervision's report into several child welfare cases from municipalities, which included recommendations for measures to be taken at the municipal level to assist children. The report did however mention that the county wide services were sufficient. Helleland stated that the government would be prioritising more competence for child welfare workers rather than increasing the employment numbers.

When the Christian Democratic Party joined the cabinet on 22 January 2019, Helleland was shuffled out of the cabinet and was succeeded by Kjell Ingolf Ropstad.

=== Minister of Regional Development and Digitalisation ===
She rejoined the cabinet on 24 January 2020 upon being appointed minister of districts and digitalisation when the Progress Party withdrew from the government.

Following the Solberg cabinet's defeat at the 2021 election, Helleland left her post on 14 October following the new cabinet's appointment. Her position was left vacant for the next two years until Karianne Tung was appointed to the post.

== Vice President of WADA ==
Helleland was elected vice president of the World Anti-Doping Agency in 2016 representing governments in WADAs Foundation Board and executive committee. Near the end of her term, she released a book, detailing her experiences as vice president. She described a toxic working environment and uses of threats and intimidation. Furthermore, she described how she was gradually isolated from her coworkers and a deteriorating relationship with WADA President Craig Reedie.

== Personal life ==
She is married to Trond Helleland and has two sons.

== External sources ==
- "Linda Hofstad Helleland" (in Norwegian). Storting.

Political offices
Preceded by Thorhild Widvey	Minister of Culture; 2015–2018	Succeeded by Trine Skei Grande
Preceded by Solveig Horne	Minister of Children and Equality; 2018–2019	Succeeded by Kjell Ingolf Ropstad
Preceded by Nikolai Astrup	Minister of Regional Development and Digitalisation; 2020–2021	Vacant Title next held by Karianne Tung
