= Carsten Staur =

Danish diplomat

H.E. Ambassador Carsten Staur
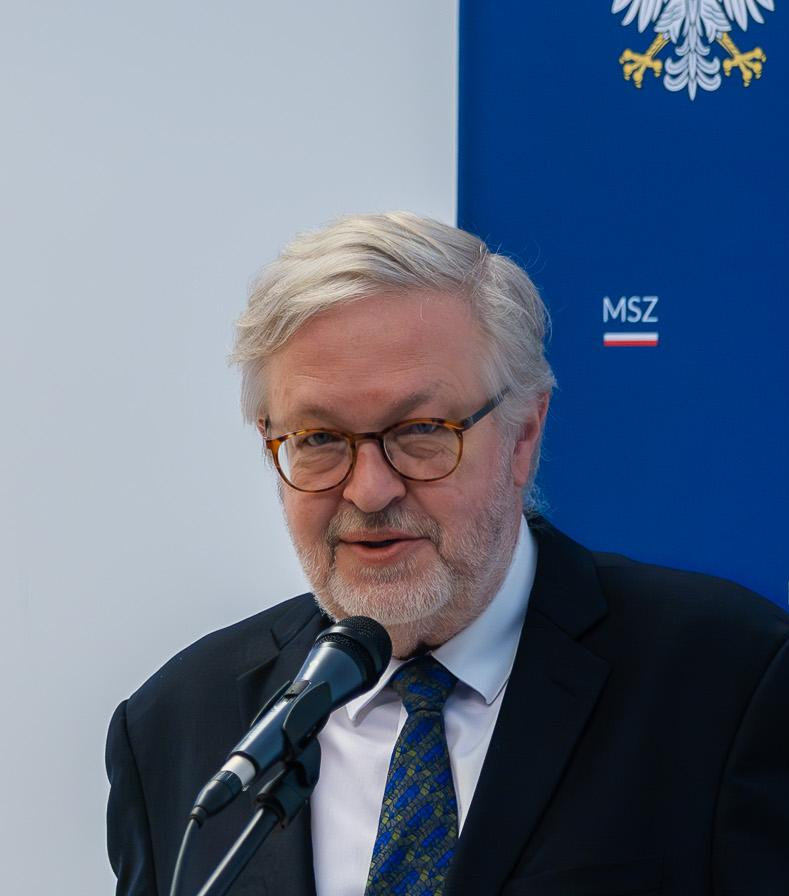
- Carsten Staur (2024)

Chair of the Development Assistance Committee (DAC) in OECD, Paris
- Incumbent
- Assumed office March 2023

Permanent Representative to the OECD and Permanent Delegate to the UNESCO in Paris for Denmark
- In office 2018–2023

Permanent Representative to the UN in Geneva for Denmark
- In office 2013–2018

Permanent Representative to the UN in New York for Denmark
- In office 2007–2013

Ambassador to Israel for Denmark
- In office 1996–1998

Personal details
- Born: 9 November 1954 (age 71)
- Spouse: Marie-Louise Wandel
- Education: University of Copenhagen

Carsten Staur (born 9 November 1954) is a Danish diplomat who has been chairing the Organisation for Economic Co-operation and Development’s Development Assistance Committee since 2023 He previously served as the Permanent Representative of Denmark to the Organisation for Economic Co-operation and Development in Paris. Prior to this he was Denmark's Permanent Representative to the United Nations in Geneva (2013–2018), and before that Permanent Representative to the United Nations in New York (2007–2013).

== Early life and education ==
Staur holds a MA degree (History and Literature) from the University of Copenhagen.

== Career ==
Staur joined the Ministry of Foreign Affairs of Denmark in 1981. From 1996 to 1998, he served as Denmark's Ambassador to Israel. He then became Under Secretary for Administrative Affairs (1998-2000) and later Under Secretary for Bilateral Development Cooperation (2000-2001).

Staur has an extensive background in development cooperation. He was State Secretary in the Ministry of Foreign Affairs from 2001 to 2007, with responsibility for the implementation of the Danish International Development Agency (DANIDA). As State Secretary, he was also in charge of Denmark's cooperation with the United Nations system and the World Bank.

As representative of Denmark, Staur has chaired UNHCR's executive committee (2015-2016), the drafting committee of the 32nd Conference of the International Red Cross and Red Crescent (2015), and the Board of UNDP, UNFPA, and UNOPS (2007-2008). He also served as vice-chair of the council of the International Organization for Migration (IOM) from 2016 to 2018; and was a member of the board of the Global Fund to Fight AIDS, Tuberculosis and Malaria (GFATM) from 2005 to 2007 and again from 2016 to 2018.

In 2022, Staur became Denmark's candidate to succeed Susanna Moorehead as chair of the Organisation for Economic Co-operation and Development’s Development Assistance Committee; in the final vote, he won over Nikolai Astrup, who won the support of 13 members in the ballot compared to Staur’s 16.

Staur has published the books: “Shared Responsibility. The United Nations in the Age of Globalization”, McGill-Queens's University Press, 2013; and “Skilleveje. Dansk udenrigspolitik i 250 år”, Gads Forlag, 2020 (in Danish).

== Publications ==
- "Shared Responsibility - The United Nations in the Age of Globalization" by Carsten Staur, McGill-Queen's University Press (2013)
- “Skilleveje. Dansk udenrigspolitik i 250 år” by Carsten Staur, Gads Forlag (2020)
