= Nikolai Astrup (politician) =

Norwegian politician (born 1978)

Nikolai Astrup MP
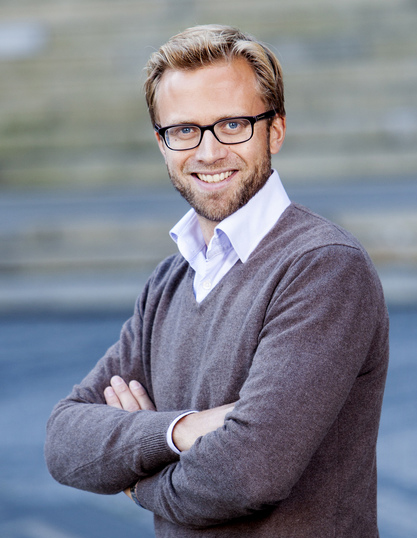
- Astrup in November 2012

Minister of Local Government
- In office 24 January 2020 – 14 October 2021
- Prime Minister: Erna Solberg
- Preceded by: Monica Mæland
- Succeeded by: Bjørn Arild Gram

Minister of Digitalisation
- In office 22 January 2019 – 24 January 2020
- Prime Minister: Erna Solberg
- Preceded by: Office established
- Succeeded by: Linda Hofstad Helleland

Minister of International Development
- In office 17 January 2018 – 22 January 2019
- Prime Minister: Erna Solberg
- Preceded by: Heikki Holmås (2013)
- Succeeded by: Dag Inge Ulstein

Member of the Norwegian Parliament
- Incumbent
- Assumed office 1 October 2009
- Deputy: Astrid Nøklebye Heiberg; Camilla Strandskog; Eirik Lae Solberg
- Constituency: Oslo

Leader of the Oslo Conservatives
- In office 28 January 2012 – 27 January 2018
- Deputy: Kristin Vinje
- Preceded by: Michael Tetzschner
- Succeeded by: Heidi Nordby Lunde

Personal details
- Born: Nikolai Eivindssøn Astrup; 12 June 1978 (age 48) Oslo, Norway
- Party: Conservative
- Spouse: Helle Astrup
- Children: 3
- Education: London School of Economics

Nikolai Eivindssøn Astrup (born 12 June 1978) is a Norwegian politician representing the Conservative Party. He served as Minister of Local Government from 2020 to 2021. Previously he served as the Minister of International Development from 2018 to 2019 in Prime Minister Erna Solberg's cabinet, being the first since Heikki Holmås from 2012 to 2013. In 2019, he also became the first Minister of Digitalisation after the Christian Democratic Party joined the Cabinet, a post he served in until 2020.

== Education ==
Astrup graduated from Institut Le Rosey with an International General Certificate of Secondary Education (1995) and from Berg Upper Secondary School with an International Baccalaureate (1997). He holds a master's degree in European Politics and Governance and a bachelor's degree in International Relations, both from the London School of Economics and Political Science (LSE).

== Early career ==
Astrup worked in management consulting at Arkwright from 2000 until 2002. Between 2001 and 2008 he was the editor of the conservative periodical Minerva.

Prior to his election to parliament, Astrup worked as political adviser for the Conservative Party parliamentary group and political adviser to the Governing Mayor of Oslo Erling Lae from 2008 until 2009.

== Political career ==
=== Parliament ===
Ahead of the 2009 election for parliament, Astrup was nominated as the Conservative Party's fourth candidate for Oslo, considered the last safe seat; he defeated Inge Lønning in the nomination. Astrup was elected Member of Parliament in 2009 and leader of the Conservative Party in Oslo in 2012 and has previously been leader of the Oslo Norwegian Young Conservatives. He was re-elected as leader of the Oslo Conservative Party in 2014 and 2016 before stepping down in 2018, when he was succeeded by Heidi Nordby Lunde. Kristin Vinje served as his deputy throughout the entirety of his term.

Ahead of the election in 2013 Astrup was nominated as the second candidate for Oslo, behind the Minister of Defence, Ine Eriksen Søreide. Due to his relatively young age, he was considered a rising star in the party at the time. After the elections, Astrup was appointed as deputy leader of the Conservative Party Parliamentary Group, and he was re-appointed to this position after the 2017 election. He held this position until his government appointment in January 2018.

In parliament, Astrup sat on the Standing Committee on Energy and the Environment from 2009 to 2015, and from 2016 to 2017 he chaired the Standing Committee on Transport and Communication. After the election in 2017 he was appointed chair of the Standing Committee on Finance and is the Conservative's spokesperson on issues relating to these issues. For a number of years Astrup was also spokesperson on European affairs.

Following the cabinet's defeat at the 2021 election, he was appointed spokesperson for energy and environmental policy. He became the party's financial spokesperson following the 2025 election.

=== Party politics ===
Following Erna Solberg's resignation as party leader following the 2025 parliamentary election, Astrup was considered one of the favourite candidates to succeed her. He officially announced his candidacy in October, stating that the party "needs to find back to itself". He withdrew his candidacy the next month and endorsed Ine Eriksen Søreide. Astrup also ruled himself out of the running for the deputy leadership, arguing that the leadership needed a broad regional reflection.

=== Minister ===
Astrup entered the Solberg cabinet in 2018 as minister of international development, a post he held until 2019. That year he was appointed minister of digitisation, and the year after, minister of local government.

=== Minister of International Development ===
Following the Liberal Party's entrance into the Solberg cabinet, Astrup was appointed minister of international development, the first person to hold the post in five years.

In his capacity as minister, Astrup was appointed by United Nations Secretary General António Guterres in 2018 to the High-level Panel on Digital Cooperation, co-chaired by Melinda Gates and Jack Ma.

=== Minister of Digitalisation ===
After the Christian Democratic Party entered government on 22 January 2019, Astrup was appointed minister of digitalisation, the first of its kind.

=== Minister of Local Government ===
After the Progress Party withdrew from government in January 2020, Astrup was appointed minister of local government, succeeding Monica Mæland, who had been appointed minister of justice.

Astrup championed the implementation of the Sustainability Development Goals (SDG) in all of government and local municipalities, being among the first countries to localize the 2030-agenda, as the Norwegian prime minister Erna Solberg was the UN Secretary General's co-chair for the SDGs.

== Later career ==
In 2022, Astrup was Norway's candidate to succeed Susanna Moorehead as chair of the Organisation for Economic Co-operation and Development's Development Assistance Committee. In the final vote, he lost to Carsten Staur, who won the support of 16 members in the ballot compared to Astrup's 13.

== Other activities ==
=== International organizations ===
- Asian Infrastructure Investment Bank (AIIB), Ex-Officio Member of the Board of Governors (2018–2019)
- Multilateral Investment Guarantee Agency (MIGA), World Bank Group, Ex-Officio Member of the Board of Governors (2018-2019)
- World Bank, Ex-Officio Member of the Board of Governors (2018-2019)

=== Corporate boards ===
- Pactum AS, Member of the Board (2010–2015)

=== Non-profit organizations ===
- European Movement in Norway, Vice-President (2012–2013)

== Recognition ==
In March 2011, Astrup was named the "European of the Year" by the JEF Norway.

== Personal life ==
In 2017, Astrup’s estimated net worth was $40 million, making him the wealthiest member of Parliament.

Astrup is married to Nordea attorney Helle Astrup, with whom he has three children.

Government offices
Vacant Title last held by Heikki Holmås	Minister of International Development; 2018–2019	Succeeded by Dag Inge Ulstein
New office	Minister of Digitalisation; 2019–2020	Succeeded by Linda Hofstad Helleland
Preceded by Monica Mæland	Minister of Local Government; 2020–2021	Succeeded by Bjørn Arild Gram
Party political offices
Preceded by Michael Tetzschner	Leader of the Conservative Party in Oslo; 2012–2018	Succeeded by Heidi Nordby Lunde
Preceded by Jan Tore Sanner	Deputy Parliamentary Leader of the Conservative Party; 2013–2018	Succeeded by Tone Wilhelmsen Trøen
