= Julius Oketta =

Ugandan Senior Commander (1956–2016)

- Born: 3 October 1956; Amuru District, Uganda
- Died: 5 November 2016 (aged 60); Kadic Hospital, Naguru; Kampala, Uganda
- Citizenship: Uganda
- Education: Cambridge International College (Diploma in Economics & Commerce); Ndejje University (Bachelor of Business Administration); Cambridge Management Institute (Master of Business Administration); Uganda Senior Command and Staff College (Senior Command and Staff Course)
- Occupation: Military officer
- Years active: 1979–2016
- Known for: Military matters, management

Major General Julius Facki Oketta (3 October 1956 – 5 November 2016) was a military officer in Uganda. He was a senior commander in the Uganda People's Defence Force (UPDF). Before his death, he was the Director of National Emergency Coordination and Operations in the Office of the Prime Minister of Uganda. In October 2013, the President of Uganda nominated and the Secretary General of the United Nations endorsed General Oketta to join the advisory group of the United Nations (UN) Central Emergency Response Fund (CERF). In 2004, at the rank of Brigadier, he was a member of the pioneer class to attend the Uganda Senior Command and Staff College, at Kimaka, Jinja, Eastern Uganda, under its first Commandant, Lieutenant General Ivan Koreta. Oketta died in the early hours on 5 November 2016.

== Work history ==
He joined the army in 1979 immediately after the overthrow of President Idi Amin. He was a UNLA officer before joining the NRA in 1985. From 1989 until 1993, he was the division commander of the 6th Division of the National Resistance Army (NRA). From 2001 until 2003, he was the chief of logistics and engineering in the UPDF. In 2003, he was the Uganda liaison officer, in the Republic of Sudan. Following that, he was the head of the Procurement and Disposal Unit at the Uganda Ministry of Defence during 2004. From 2007 until his death in 2016, he was the director of the National Emergency Co-ordination and Operations Center, in the Office of the Prime Minister. In 2013 he joined the UN CERF-Advisory Group. He was appointed to CERF's advisory committee. Members of the advisory group represent themselves and not their country. Other group members included Susan Eckey of Norway, Susanna Moorehead from the UK, Yukie Osa from Japan and Croatian Nancy Butijer.

== Other responsibilities ==
He was also a Member of Parliament, representing the UPDF in the 9th parliament (2011 to 2016). In parliament, he was a member of the Committee on Commissions, Statutory Authorities and State Enterprises. In September 2014, Major General Oketta was nominated to join the African Union-led humanitarian mission to address the threat of the Ebola virus to the continent. The mission, code-named Africa Union Support to Ebola Outbreak in West Africa (ASEOWA), is based in Ethiopia. Oketta was awarded a medal of honor by the President of Liberia for his efforts in the fight against Ebola.
