= Thomas Breen =

Norwegian politician (born 1972)

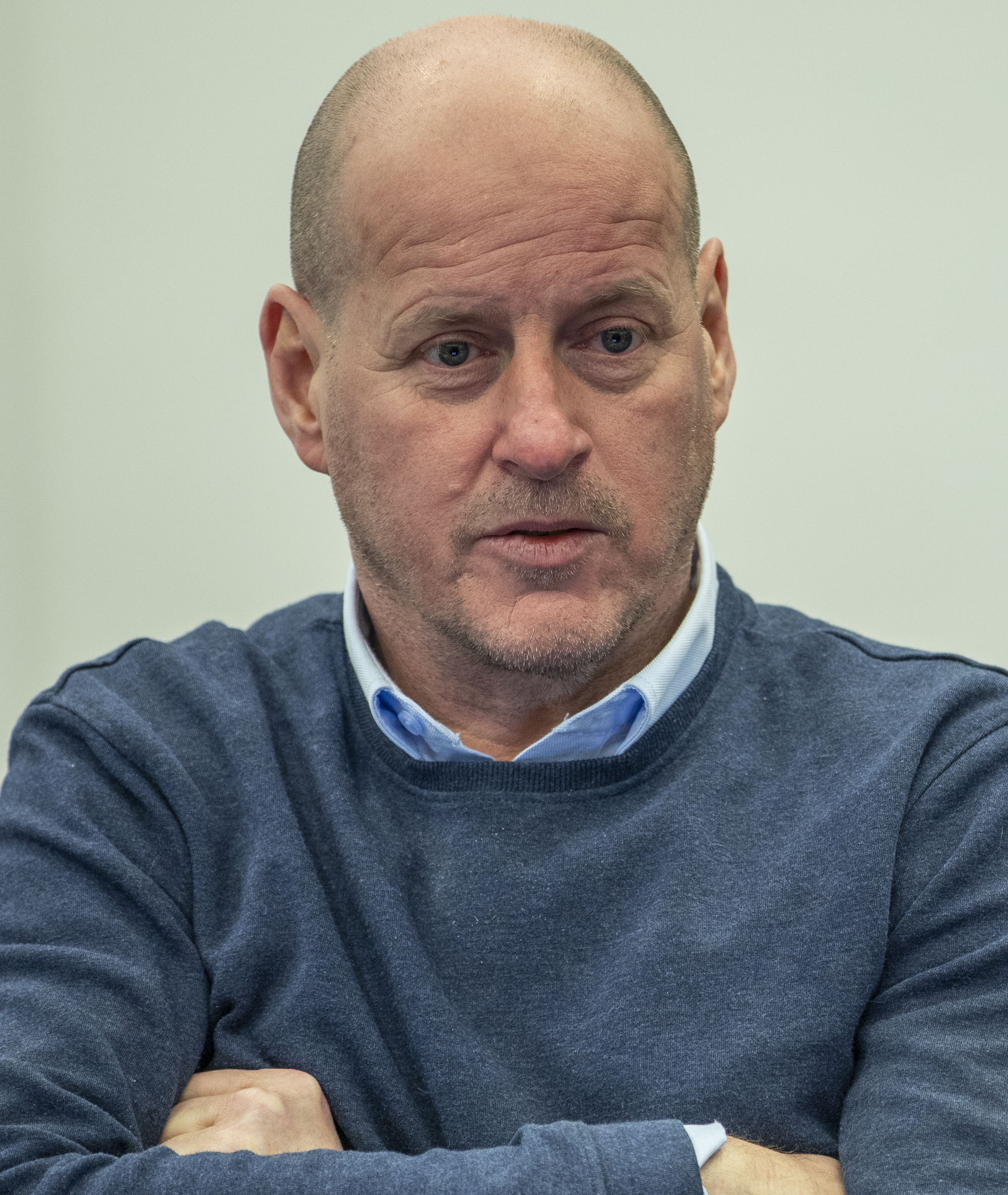
- Breen in 2025

County Mayor of Innlandet
- Incumbent
- Assumed office 24 October 2023
- Deputy: Hanne Velure
- Preceded by: Aud Hove

Member of the Storting
- In office 1 October 2009 – 30 September 2013
- Constituency: Hedmark

Deputy Member of the Storting
- In office 1 October 2005 – 30 September 2009
- Deputising for: Knut Storberget
- Constituency: Hedmark

Personal details
- Born: 13 September 1972 (age 54) Folldal Municipality, Hedmark, Norway
- Party: Labour

Thomas Breen (born 13 September 1972) is a Norwegian politician for the Labour Party. He represented Hedmark in the Norwegian Parliament from 2009 to 2013, where he was elected to deputise for Knut Storberget, who was appointed to a government position. He previously served as a deputy representative from 2005 to 2009, during which he deputised for Storberget.

== Political career ==
=== Parliament ===
Breen was elected as a deputy representative from Hedmark at the 2005 election. He held the position until 2009. During his term he also sat on the Standing Committee on Justice and also deputised for Knut Storberget, who served as minister of justice in Jens Stoltenberg's second government.

He was elected as a regular representative from Hedmark at the 2009 election and held the position until 2013. During this time, he sat on the Election Committee, the Standing Committee on Finance and Economic Affairs between 2009 and 2011 and the Standing Committee on Health and Care Services between 2011 and 2013. He also served as the second vice chair of the latter committee between November 2011 and March 2013.

=== Local politics ===
==== Folldal and Hedmark County politics ====
He was a member of the municipal council for Folldal Municipality between 1999 and 2003. He also served as the deputy mayor of Folldal Municipality between 2003 and 2007 and concurrently a deputy member of the Hedmark County Council.

==== County Mayor of Innlandet ====
Breen was the Labour Party's nominee for county mayor in the 2023 local elections. He became county mayor of Innlandet following the election in a coalition consisting of the Labour, Conservative and Green Party, with the Conservatives' Hanne Velure as deputy county mayor. In December 2025, he announced that he wouldn't seek re-election at the 2027 local elections.

During his term, he was notably criticised in August 2024 for the county establishing a health group that would evaluate which students with mental illnesses could be qualified for taxi rides to schools. Breen defended the decision, arguing that the purpose of the group is to find the right tools to help with the issue.

Breen and his coalition faced criticism and mass protests in October 2024 when they announced the county council's decision to close down several upper secondary schools and their school places around Innlandet. Justice Minister Emilie Mehl caused controversy when she described Breen as "prostituting himself to the Conservative Party" in order to issue the closure, which both Breen and his deputy condemned and called on Mehl to focus on her duties as minister. Mayor of Lom Municipality Kristian Frisvold stated that "this is war" in a municipal council meeting and encouraged people to dig up dirt on Breen and other county politicians. Breen called his comments "undemocratic" and distanced himself from Frisvold's rhetoric. Despite all the opposition to the closures, a majority in the Innlandet county council approved the school closures on 23 October. By December, he further suggested that more closures would be necessary in the coming years in order to keep pace with declining population numbers. He further suggested that Mehl should resign and retake her parliamentary duties after she visited one of the affected schools, if she wanted to focus on local issues outside of her ministerial duties.

In June 2025, the county legislature voted 29–28 against providing public funds to the establishment of private-run upper secondary schools in Lom and Flisa. After several members resigned from the former local Labour chapter, Breen dismissed accusations of utilising the party whip to ensure enough support against public funding after a legislative deputy member was dismissed and replaced. The member, Bjørn Olav Aukrust, had supported public funding of the private upper secondary schools and could have tilted the majority in favour of funding had he not been dismissed.

In September 2025, it was revealed that the county director Tron O. Bamrud, had given Breen advance payment of remuneration three times with a total sum of 150 000 NOK. The chief of staff Hjalmar Nørstebø-Solbjør notified about the issue and expressed that the director can't approve such payments to elected officials, which is also in violation of county guidelines. Other counties around the country have stated that they don't issue similar payments at all. Ernst & Young was tasked with investigating the issue and have preliminarily determined that the county guidelines were possibly breached and encouraged that the matter be looked into further.

In November 2026, he criticised his own party in government for their plan to relocate reindeer in Fosen to Nord-Østerdalen, arguing that despite the verdict in the prior court case, relocation would only make the matter worse. He sighted that it would cause further division between the Sami with semi-domesticated reindeer, the agriculture sector, the local population, and commercial interests. Concurrently a Innlandet county commission unanimously agreed to advise the governemnt against the relocation plans.

== Controversies ==
Breen was implicated in the impartiality scandal that forced the resignation of minister of culture and equality Anette Trettebergstuen in June 2023. He was one of the two colleagues she had appointed to the board of Norsk Tipping, and she claimed to have evaluated her impartiality regarding Breen.

Political offices
Preceded by Aud Hove	County Mayor of Innlandet; 2023–present	Incumbent
Preceded by Tore Hagebakken	Second Vice Chair of the Standing Committee on Health and Care Services; 2011–2013	Succeeded by Håkon Haugli
