= Mykhailo Podolyak =

Ukrainian presidential adviser (born 1972)

- Михайло Подоляк
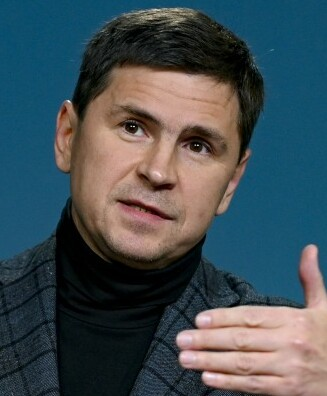
- Podolyak in 2021

Advisor to the Head of the Office of the President of Ukraine
- Incumbent
- Assumed office April 2020
- President: Volodymyr Zelenskyy

Personal details
- Born: Mykhailo Mykhailovych Podolyak; 16 February 1972 (age 54) Lviv, Ukrainian SSR, Soviet Union
- Education: Minsk Medical Institute
- Occupation: Journalist, political strategist

Mykhailo Mykhailovych Podolyak (Note: Ukrainian: Михайло Михайлович Подоляк; Ukrainian pronunciation: [meˈxai̯ɫɔ meˈxai̯ɫɔʋet͡ʃ pɔdɔˈlʲak]) (born 16 February 1972) is a Ukrainian politician, journalist and negotiator, serving as the advisor to the head of the Office of the President of Ukraine. In 2022, he became one of the representatives of Ukraine at Russian-Ukrainian peace negotiations during the 2022 Russian invasion of Ukraine.

== Early life and education ==
Podolyak spent his childhood in Lviv and Novovolynsk, Ukraine. Between 1989 and 2004, Podolyak lived and worked in Belarus. He graduated from the Minsk Medical Institute.

== Career ==
=== Journalism in Belarus ===
In the 1990s, Podolyak worked as a journalist for various newspapers, including Narodnaja Vola and Belorusskaya Delovaya Gazeta as well as a newspaper affiliated with the pro-Russian politician Sergei Gaidukevich. Podolyak was criticized by members of the Belarusian democratic opposition for a publication discrediting the former opposition presidential candidate Alaksandar Milinkievič.

In 2004, Podolyak was deputy editor-in-chief of the opposition Belarusian newspaper Vremya. In June 2004, officers of the KGB of Belarus came to his house and gave him half an hour to collect his things. The Belarusian authorities accused Podoliak that his activities "contradict the interests of state security", and the materials contain "slanderous fabrications about the real situation in the country, calls to destabilize the political situation in Belarus".

=== Journalism in Ukraine ===
In 2005, Podolyak was the editor-in-chief of Ukrainska Hazeta. In June, the newspaper published his article "The Last Supper": it concerned the poisoning in 2004 of the then presidential candidate Viktor Yushchenko. The material was a journalistic investigation presented in an artistic form. In it, Podolyak, relying on his own sources, suggested that persons close to Yushchenko were behind the poisoning of David Zhvania, deputy head of the headquarters of Yushchenko's Our Ukraine Bloc, and Yevhen Chervonenko, Minister of Transport and Communications, a member of Yushchenko's party.

After that, investigators from the Security Service of Ukraine (SBU, headed at that time by Oleksandr Turchynov), came to the editorial office to find out if similar materials about Yushchenko's poisoning would still be published in the newspaper. In addition, the Prosecutor General's Office summoned Podolyak for questioning as a witness in the poisoning case. According to Podolyak himself, during the 4 hours of interrogation he was mainly asked about the sources of information, which he refused to name. Law enforcement officers also tried to find out who paid for the publication of such an article. Podolyak claims that there was no customer, but due to pressure, the newspaper was unable to publish the second part of the investigation.

In 2006, Podolyak began working with Ukrainian internet publication Obozrevatel as a freelancer. At the same time, he became an adviser to the owner of the publication, Chairman of the State Committee for Regulatory Policy and Entrepreneurship, Mykhailo Brodskyy. In December 2011, Podoliak became the editor-in-chief of Obozrevatel.

=== Russo-Ukrainian War ===
In April 2020, Podolyak became an adviser to the head of the Office of the President of Ukraine Andriy Yermak and an "anti-crisis manager" of the Office. He controls the entire information policy of the Office of the President and advises Volodymyr Zelenskyy directly. In addition, he prepares ministers of the Ukrainian government for broadcasts in the media so that their theses are coordinated with the content promoted by the president.

==== Russian invasion of Ukraine (2022–present) ====
===== 2022 =====
On 25 February, as the 2022 Russian invasion of Ukraine had begun, Podolyak and prime minister Denys Shmyhal briefed the media. In the early days, the Russian armed forces failed to significantly advance deep into the territory of Ukraine due to Ukrainian defenses. On 26 February, the Office of the President of Ukraine alleged that the advance of the Russians had stopped due to “huge losses” allegedly inflicted by the Ukrainian army.

On 28 February, the first round of Ukrainian-Russian negotiations took place on the territory of Belarus. Podolyak, as part of the Ukrainian delegation, participated in both this and subsequent rounds of meetings and became the main speaker of Ukraine during the negotiations. At the same time, according to him, the key demands, uncompromising for Ukraine, are: a ceasefire, the withdrawal of Russian troops to the positions they occupied before 24 February, and security guarantees.

“Our position at the negotiations is quite specific — legally verified security guarantees; ceasefire; withdrawal of Russian troops. This is possible only with a direct dialogue between the heads of Ukraine and the Russian Federation.” — said Podolyak in an interview with PBS. “There are some concessions that we definitely aren’t going to make,” he said. “We cannot give away any territories.”

After the discovery of Russian war crimes in Bucha in April 2022 Podolyak was worried that the occurrence would complicate ceasefire discussions with Russia.

On 22 May 2022, after Russia captured the Azovstal steelworks and took full control of Mariupol, Podolyak ruled out ceasefire talks with Russia and would not accept any deal that ceded territories to Russia.

On 9 June 2022, Podolyak stated to the BBC "that between 100 and 200 Ukrainian troops are being killed on the front line every day."

On 17 June 2022, Podolyak was interviewed by France24 in the wake of the visit of a day after the visit of the Emmanuel Macron, Olaf Scholz, Mario Draghi and Klaus Iohannis to Kyiv and Irpin. He stressed that Ukraine could win the war in three to six months if it were to obtain heavy weapons.

On 9 August 2022, Podolyak told the BBC: "In short, in my opinion, it’s impossible [to return to the March 2022 Istanbul communiqué]. The emotional background in Ukraine has changed very, very much. We have seen too many war crimes live. Ukrainian society will probably not agree because will understand that if Russia bears no responsibility for these crimes, they will continue in one form or another in the territory of Ukraine. Therefore, the communiqué that was proposed in Istanbul should undergo a certain upgrade." On the same day he said he had deduced the Putinite strategy of wartime negotiation.

On 10 August 2022, Spanish daily El País elicited a comment in interview from Podolyak that if a single point of conflict with Russia remains, it will be an unfinished war.

In an in-depth 16 August 2022 interview with The Guardian Podolyak said the current aim of the Ukrainians was "to create chaos with Russian forces", specifically targeting supply lines and Crimea. According to him, "there was no prospect of Russia negotiating seriously until it experienced a defeat on the battlefield." He added that the tactics of the opponents differed: "a Ukrainian counteroffensive looks very different. We don’t use the tactics of the 60s and 70s, of the last century." Rather, "by striking at the invaders’ supply lines deep into occupied territories.. [the] strategy is to destroy the logistics, the supply lines and the ammunition depots and other objects of military infrastructure."

On 19 August a Ukrainian source quoted Podolyak as follows: "Negotiations with Russia are a game of Russian roulette with a full cylinder and a fatal ending for everyone. This is a continuation of war, terror, and criminal blackmail."

In August 2022 when Hungarian-based Wizz Air announced that it would restart flights between Moscow and Abu Dhabi in the midst of the Russian invasion of its neighbour, Podolyak tweeted: "Cynics Wizz Air decided that Ukrainians’ blood does not smell, but Russian rubles from Moscow flights smell nice. Soon they realized that supporting barbarians is not about profit, but about destroyed reputation."

On 24 August 2022, Ukraine saw its thirty-first anniversary and the sixth month mark since the beginning of the invasion. Podolyak rejected a "congratulatory" message from Alexander Lukashenko, the president of Belarus. Podolyak called Lukashenko's message cynical and disingenuous given Belarus' heavy involvement in the attacks of Ukraine, and asserted that "this blood-soaked clowning is recorded and will have consequences."

===== 2023 =====
In March 2023, he rejected the Chinese peace plan, saying that "One of the points says about the inviolability of sovereignty and territorial integrity, and the other about the need for an immediate ceasefire, which means the transfer of the occupied territories to Russia: but this is an absolute contradiction."

On 5 April 2023, Podolyak declared that Ukraine should "completely close everything related to the Russian cultural space" in Crimea and advocated driving "the Russian world out of there in its entirety", including Russian troops and "many people [dragged] from the Russian Federation to Crimea, who illegally obtained our property", calling them "gangsters", "criminals", and "occupying armies and administrations".

Ιn June 2023, Podolyak came under criticism for calling African leaders "incompetent" and telling them to "stay out of European affairs" after a delegation of African leaders headed by South African President Cyril Ramaphosa met with Ukrainian President Volodymyr Zelenskyy in Kyiv and Russian President Vladimir Putin in St. Petersburg.

In July 2023 when Ukrainian four-time individual world sabre champion Olga Kharlan was disqualified at the World Fencing Championships for not shaking the hand of her defeated Russian opponent, though Kharlan instead offered a tapping of blades in acknowledgement, Podolyak voiced support for Kharlan. He called the Fédération Internationale d'Escrime (FIE) decision "absolutely shameful," and posted a photo on his Twitter feed which appeared to show the Russian fencer smiling and flashing the victory sign with a Russian soldier, writing: "The photo features ... the Russian fencer.... As you can see, she openly admires the Russian army.... The [FIE] disqualified the Ukrainian representative for not shaking hands with the Russian."

On 13 September 2023 Podolyak came under criticism for a statement in which he claimed, "What's wrong with India, China, Turkey and so forth. The problem is that they are not analysing the consequences of their steps, these countries have weak intellectual potential, unfortunately. Yes, they invest in science. Yes, India has launched a lunar rover presently and is now trekking on the surface of the Moon, but that does not indicate that this country fully comprehends what the modern world is about." Ukrainian Embassy in Delhi stated that it was his personal opinion while Podolyak accused Russian propaganda outlets of taking it out of context to distort the meaning.

===== 2025 =====
In April 2025, Podolyak called for secondary sanctions against Russia, saying, "Everything Russia earns on global markets — it's not just oil and liquefied gas, but also pipeline gas — must be subject to secondary sanctions against countries that are profiting from this without consequences."

== Awards and honors ==
- Commander's Cross of the Order of the Lithuanian Grand Duke Gediminas (Lithuania, 2023)
