= Torgeir Micaelsen =

Norwegian politician

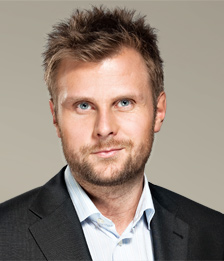
- Micaelsen in 2012

Minister of Digitalisation and Public Governance
- Incumbent
- Assumed office 11 September 2026
- Prime Minister: Jonas Gahr Støre
- Preceded by: Karianne Tung

Member of the Storting
- In office 1 October 2005 – 30 September 2017
- Constituency: Buskerud

Personal details
- Born: 20 May 1979 (age 47) Bergen, Hordaland, Norway
- Party: Labour
- Spouse: Line Deinboll-Micaelsen
- Children: 3
- Education: University of Oslo; BI Norwegian Business School

Torgeir Eikstad Micaelsen (born 20 May 1979 in Bergen) is a Norwegian politician for the Labour Party. He was a member of the Norwegian Parliament from Buskerud from 2005 to 2017. He had previously served as a deputy representative from 2001 to 2005. Micaelsen made it to some fame as "the man who got slapped by Martin Schanche". The incident happened during a 2003 school debate in Drammen.

== Political career ==
=== Parliament ===
He served as a deputy member of the Storting for Buskerud between 2001 and 2005, before being elected a regular member in 2005. He was re-elected in 2009 and 2013. Micaelsen led the Standing Committee on Finance and Economic Affairs between 2009 and 2013, and then served as the second vice chair of the Standing Committee on Health and Care Services from 2013 to 2017.

=== Local politics ===
On the local level Micaelsen was a member of Nedre Eiker municipal council from 1999 to 2003.

=== State Secretary ===
In 2024, he was appointed state secretary at the Ministry of Digitalisation and Public Governance. In February 2025, he was re-assigned to the Ministry of Finance.

=== Minister of Digitalisation ===
In September 2026, he was appointed Minister of Digitalisation and Public Governance in a cabinet reshuffle.

==== 2026 ====
The government signed an agreement of intention that would ensure responsible implementation and use of AI in the workforce, just two days after similar laws were implemented in the US state of California. Of the agreement, Micaelsen explained that it does not give new demands to employers, but rather mandates them and other actors, to "keep the Norwegian workforce model in mind" when using AI.

Although Micaelsen had been opposed to the usage of Meta smartglasses, he stated in November that the governemnt could allow exceptions for notably blind people to use them as means of assistance in daily life. He added that the governemnt would be consulting an expert group on how to best regulate the use of the glasses longterm.

== Personal life ==
Micaelsen is married to Line Deinboll-Micaelsen, with whom he has three sons.

Political offices
Preceded by Karianne Tung	Minister of Digitalisation and Public Governance; 2026–present	Incumbent
