= Susanna Moorehead =

British diplomat. Ambassador to Ethiopia 2016

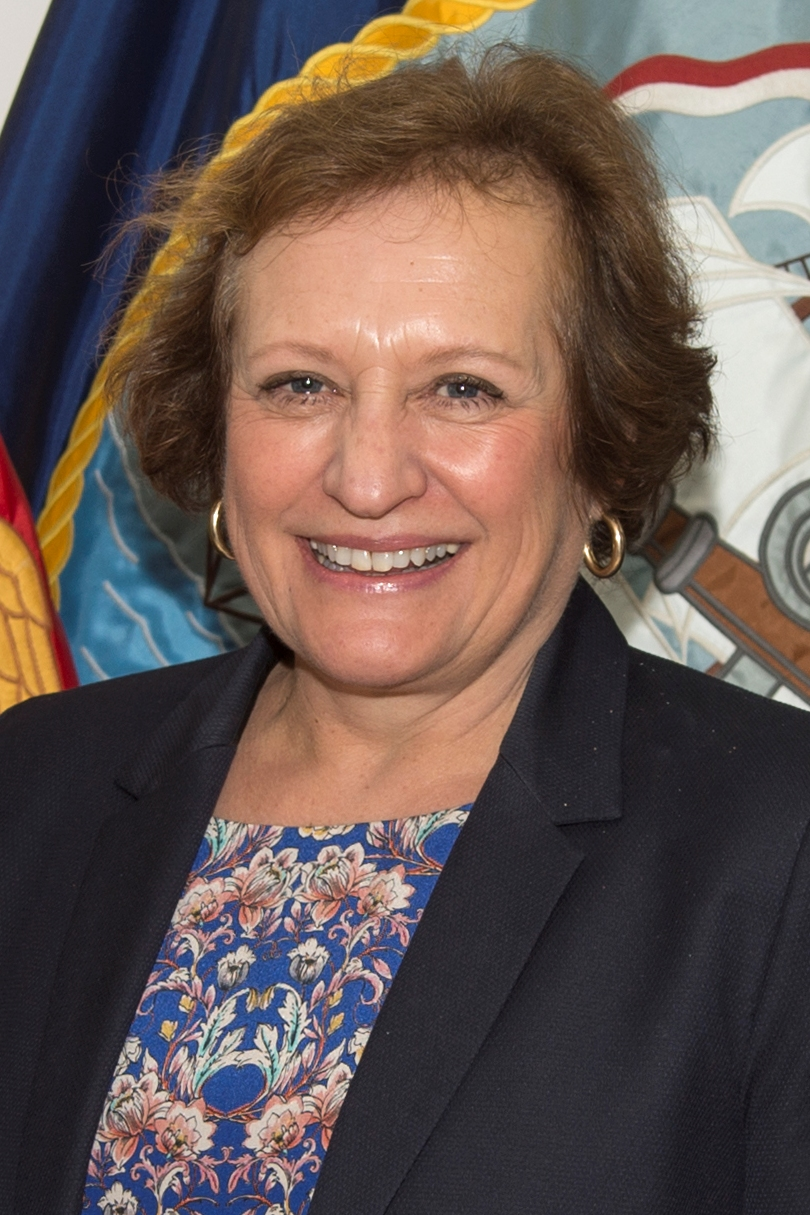
Moorhead in 2017 at Camp Lemonnier, Djibouti

Susanna Mary Davies Moorehead CMG (born 22 April 1957) is a British diplomat and civil servant who served as Chair of the OECD Development Assistance Committee from 2018 to 2022.

== Early life and career ==
Moorehead was an undergraduate at the University of York and graduated from the London School of Economics with a PhD in International Relations in 1983.

== Career ==
In 2012 Moorehead was appointed to the advisory committee to the Central Emergency Response Fund (CERF). Members of the advisory group represent themselves and not their country. Other group members included Ahmed Al-Meraikhi of Qatar, Jozef H.L.M. Andriessen from the Netherlands, Ugandan Julius Oketta, Susan Eckey of Norway, Yukie Osa from Japan and Croatian Nancy Butijer.

Moorehead has served as the U.K. Ambassador to Ethiopia and Djibouti and Permanent Representative to the African Union and UNECA. She was the U.K. Executive Director to the World Bank Group, and the Department for International Development's Director for West and Southern Africa.

She was awarded an Honorary Doctorate from University of York in 2014.

Moorehead was appointed Companion of the Order of St Michael and St George (CMG) in the 2024 New Year Honours for services to international development and diplomacy.

== Other activities ==
- Global Partnership for Effective Development Co-operation, Member of the Steering Committee
