= Vitaly Herasevich =

Belarusian physician and scientist

- Born: 1974 (age 51–52); Byelorussian Soviet Socialist Republic
- Education: Belarusian State Medical University (MD); Mayo Clinic College of Medicine and Science (MSc)
- Known for: Clinical informatics, AI in healthcare, sepsis surveillance, telemedicine, health IT evaluation
- Notable work: Sepsis; Health care quality
- Scientific career
- Fields: Clinical Informatics, Critical Care Medicine, Clinical Decision Support
- Workplaces: Mayo Clinic

Vitaly Herasevich is a Belarusian physician-scientist specializing in clinical informatics and critical care medicine. His work focuses on developing and implementing health information technology (HIT) solutions, particularly in the areas of predictive analytics, sepsis surveillance, smart alerts, and Clinical decision support system. Currently, he serves as a Professor of Anesthesiology and Medicine at the Mayo Clinic in Rochester, Minnesota. His research has over 8,000 citations and h-index over 40. Herasevich has been featured in Healthcare IT News. His perspectives on healthcare have also been highlighted in Becker's Hospital Review.

== Early life and education ==
Vitaly Herasevich was born and raised in Soviet Belarus. He earned his Doctor of Medicine (MD) and PhD degrees in Belarus. He joined the Mayo Clinic in 2006 and later ee earned his master's degree in clinical research from the Mayo Clinic College of Medicine and Science. He is also a Certified Professional in Healthcare Management Systems (CPHIMS).

== Career ==
Herasevich is recognized for his contributions to clinical informatics and critical care medicine, particularly in the development and implementation of health information technology (HIT) solutions. His work has significantly influenced the fields of real-time clinical decision support systems, AI-driven sepsis surveillance, alarm fatigue reduction, and telemedicine.

=== Key contributions ===
Herasevich co-developed AWARE, a clinical decision support platform designed to improve intensive care unit (ICU) workflows by reducing cognitive overload for clinicians. The system integrates real-time patient data, streamlining information presentation to enhance situational awareness and prevent medical errors. AWARE has been adopted in critical care settings and has demonstrated effectiveness in improving patient safety and clinician efficiency.

Herasevich played a key role in developing AI-driven predictive models for early sepsis detection, aiming to reduce mortality through timely interventions. His research has contributed to the implementation of automated monitoring systems that analyze patient data in real time, identifying early signs of sepsis before clinical deterioration occurs. These AI-powered surveillance systems have been shown to improve early intervention rates and patient outcomes in intensive care and emergency settings.

Recognizing the burden of alarm fatigue in ICUs, Herasevich led the development of smart alerting systems to reduce unnecessary alarms and enhance clinician response times. His work focuses on integrating machine learning algorithms with clinical workflows to differentiate between critical and non-urgent alerts, minimizing distractions for healthcare providers. The implementation of these intelligent alarm systems has improved patient safety by reducing alert fatigue while ensuring timely interventions for high-risk conditions.

Herasevich is the author of the Health Information Technology Evaluation Handbook, which provides a framework for assessing the impact and effectiveness of health IT solutions in clinical practice. His work emphasizes the importance of evidence-based evaluation methodologies to ensure that new health technologies improve patient care, efficiency, and safety. The book serves as a reference for researchers, policymakers, and healthcare professionals seeking to optimize health IT implementation.

In response to the growing need for remote patient management, Herasevich has contributed to research on telemedicine solutions for critically ill patients. His work explores real-time remote monitoring systems that enable continuous surveillance of high-risk patients, improving care delivery in both hospital and home settings. These innovations have been instrumental in expanding access to critical care and optimizing resource allocation, particularly during the COVID-19 pandemic.
