= Torhild Aarbergsbotten =

Norwegian politician (born 1969)

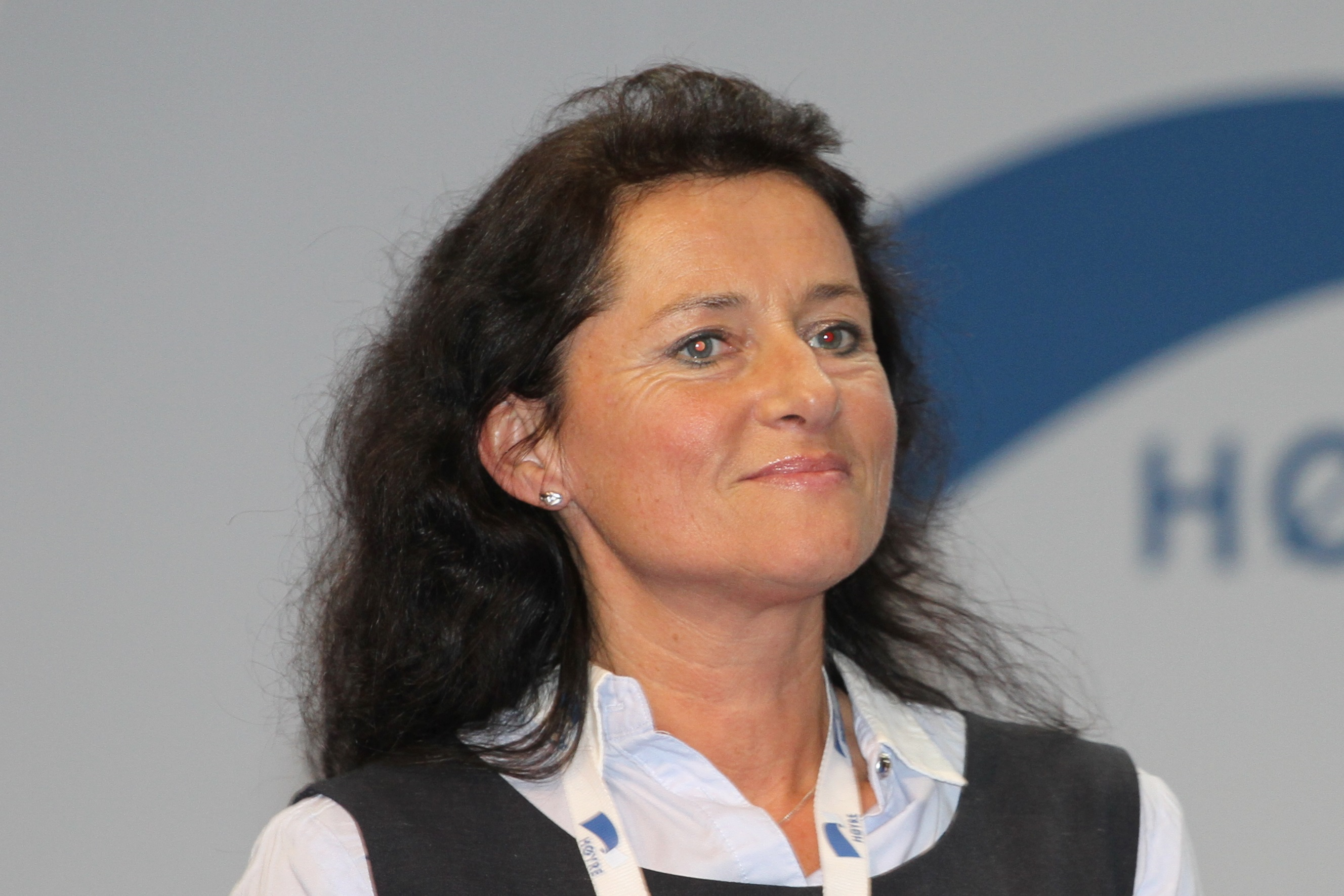
- Torhild Aarbergsbotten in 2017
- Born: December 6, 1969 (age 56); Sande, Vestland
- Occupation: Member of the Storting
- Years active: 2009–2013 and 2013–2017

Torhild Aarbergsbotten (born 6 December 1969) is a Norwegian politician for the Conservative Party.

She served as a deputy representative to the Parliament of Norway from Sør-Trøndelag during the terms 2009–2013 and 2013–2017. She hails from Sande i Sunnfjord, but resides in Ørland Municipality and has been a member of the municipal council of Ørland Municipality and the Sør-Trøndelag county council.
