= Susanne Fries-Gaier =

German diplomat

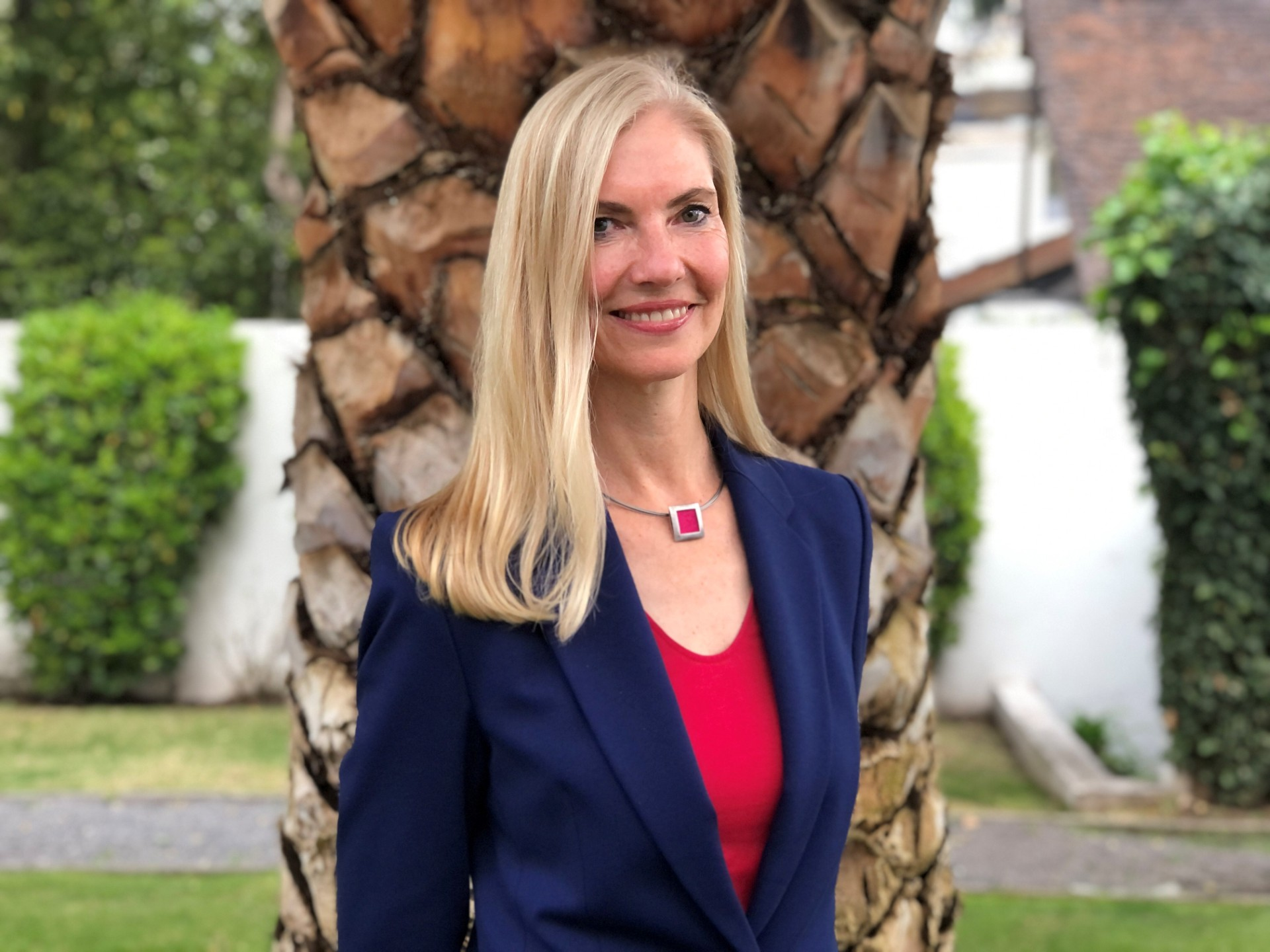
Susanne Fries-Gaier (2024)

Susanne Fries-Gaier (born July 5, 1968) is a German diplomat. From August 2021 to July 2024, she was Deputy Head of the Crisis Prevention, Stabilization, Peacebuilding and Humanitarian Aid Division and Commissioner for Humanitarian Aid at the Federal Foreign Office. In August 2024, she traveled to Chile as Ambassador-designate to take over as head of the Embassy in Santiago. Since November 6, 2024 she is the ambassador of Germany to Chile

== Biography ==
Fries-Gaier studied at the German Foreign Service Academy, from which she graduated in 1991 with a Bachelor of Arts in Public Administration. During her first diplomatic assignments abroad, she studied Political Science at the Open University of Hagen. She is married to the retired German diplomat Achim Gaier.

In 2001, she joined the training program for the Senior Foreign Service. From 2003 to 2006, she worked as a desk officer for Chinese Domestic policy at the Embassy in Beijing. This was followed by a posting in the Department for Global Affairs and the United Nations at the Federal Foreign Office from 2006 to 2008. Until 2010, she moved to the Human resources Division at the German Foreign Office headquarters.

In July 2010, Fries-Gaier was transferred to the Permanent Mission to the United Nations in New York. She served there until summer 2013 as a Counsellor in the Political Section. Back at the Federal Foreign Office, she was appointed Deputy Head of Division for UN Affairs until summer 2017.

She then moved to the Permanent Mission to the United Nations in Geneva for a year as Head of the Political Section. From there, she was transferred to the Federal Chancellery in summer 2018, where she became Head of the section for the United Nations, Global Issues, Sub-Saharan Africa and Sahel.

Back at the German Foreign Office in August 2021, she was appointed Deputy Head of the Crisis Prevention, Stabilization, Peacebuilding and Humanitarian Aid Division and Commissioner for Humanitarian Aid at the Federal Foreign Office. On June 5, 2024, the Federal Cabinet decided to appoint Fries-Gaier as Ambassador to Chile. On November 6, 2024 she presented her letter of credence to the President of the Republic of Chile, Gabriel Boric Font, to become the ambassador of Germany to Chile.

Fries-Gaier is a member of the German Council on Foreign Relations.

== Publications ==
- Fries-Gaier, Susanne; Fritze, Heidrun (2018), "Mitgestaltung oder Scheinpartizipation der Jugend?" [Involvement or pseudo-participation of young people?], Vereinte Nationen: German Review on the United Nations, vol. 66, no. 5, pp. 201–206, JSTOR 48551305
