= Minister of Digitalisation and Public Governance =

Norwegian cabinet position

Minister of Digitalisation and Public Governance of Norway
- Digitaliserings- og forvaltningsminister

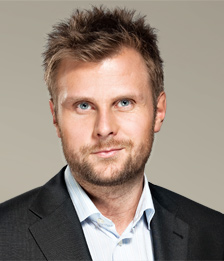
- Incumbent; Torgeir Micaelsen since 11 September 2026
- Ministry of Digitalisation and Public Governance
- Member of: Council of State
- Seat: Oslo
- Nominator: Prime Minister
- Appointer: Monarch; With approval of Parliament
- Term length: No fixed length
- Constituting instrument: Constitution of Norway
- Formation: 22 January 2019
- First holder: Nikolai Astrup
- Deputy: State secretaries at the Ministry of Digitalisation and Public Governance
- Website: Official website

The Minister of Digitalisation and Public Governance (Norwegian: Digitaliserings- og forvaltningsminister) is a ministerial position in the Norwegian government responsible for the government's digitalisation policies and coordinating its UN sustainability goals. Furthermore, the position's responsibilities are related to work and issues related to electronic communication, state building, property management, and the administrative responsibility for the county governors. In 2020, the title was changed to Minister of Regional Development and Digitalisation. In addition to digitalization policies, the minister was also responsible for overlooking the regional and district policies, privacy and policies related to the Sami people and other minorities in the country. The position was re-established in 2023, with Karianne Tung's appointment. It was also renamed Minister of Digitalisation and Public Governance and given its own ministry, the Ministry of Digitalisation and Public Governance, from 1 January 2024.

== Ministers ==
=== Key ===
Conservative Party
Labour Party

=== Minister ===
| Photo | Name | Party | Took office | Left office | Tenure | Cabinet | Ref |
|---|---|---|---|---|---|---|---|
| | Nikolai Astrup | Conservative | 22 January 2019 | 24 January 2020 | 1 year, 2 days | Solberg | |
| | Linda Hofstad Helleland | Conservative | 24 January 2020 | 14 October 2021 | 1 year, 263 days | Solberg | |
Abolished between 2021 and 2023
| | Karianne Tung | Labour | 16 October 2023 | 11 September 2026 | 2 years, 330 days | Støre | |
| | Torgeir Micaelsen | Labour | 11 September 2026 | present | 39 days | Støre | |
