= Aud Hove =

Norwegian politician

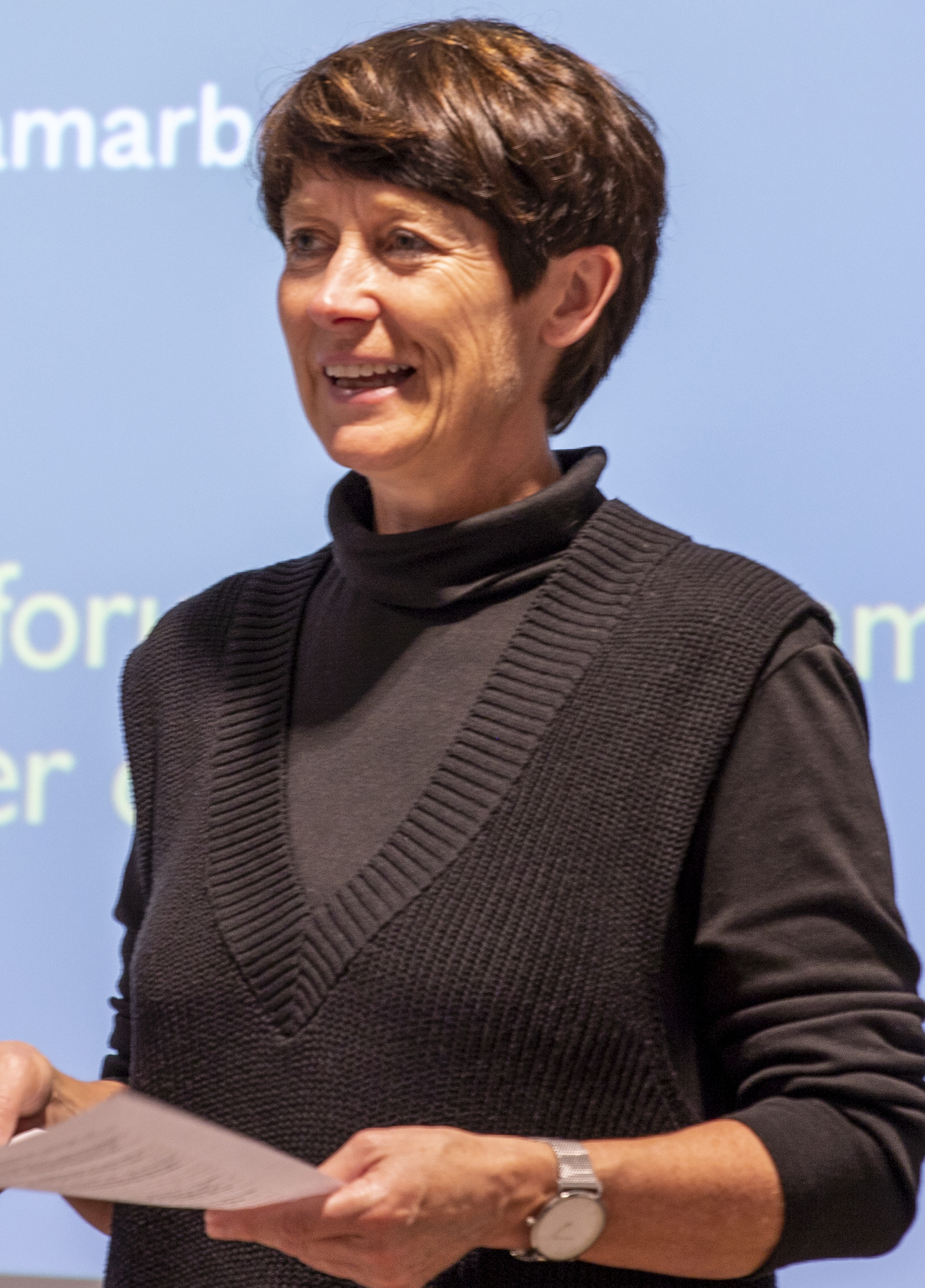
Image of Aud Hove

Aud Hove (born 5 January 1970) is a Norwegian politician for the Centre Party.

She served as a deputy representative to the Parliament of Norway from Oppland during the terms 2009–2013 and 2017–2021. She first became a member of the municipal council for Skjåk Municipality in 1995, later of Oppland county council, becoming deputy county mayor in 2017.
