= Elena Buglova =

IAEA administrator

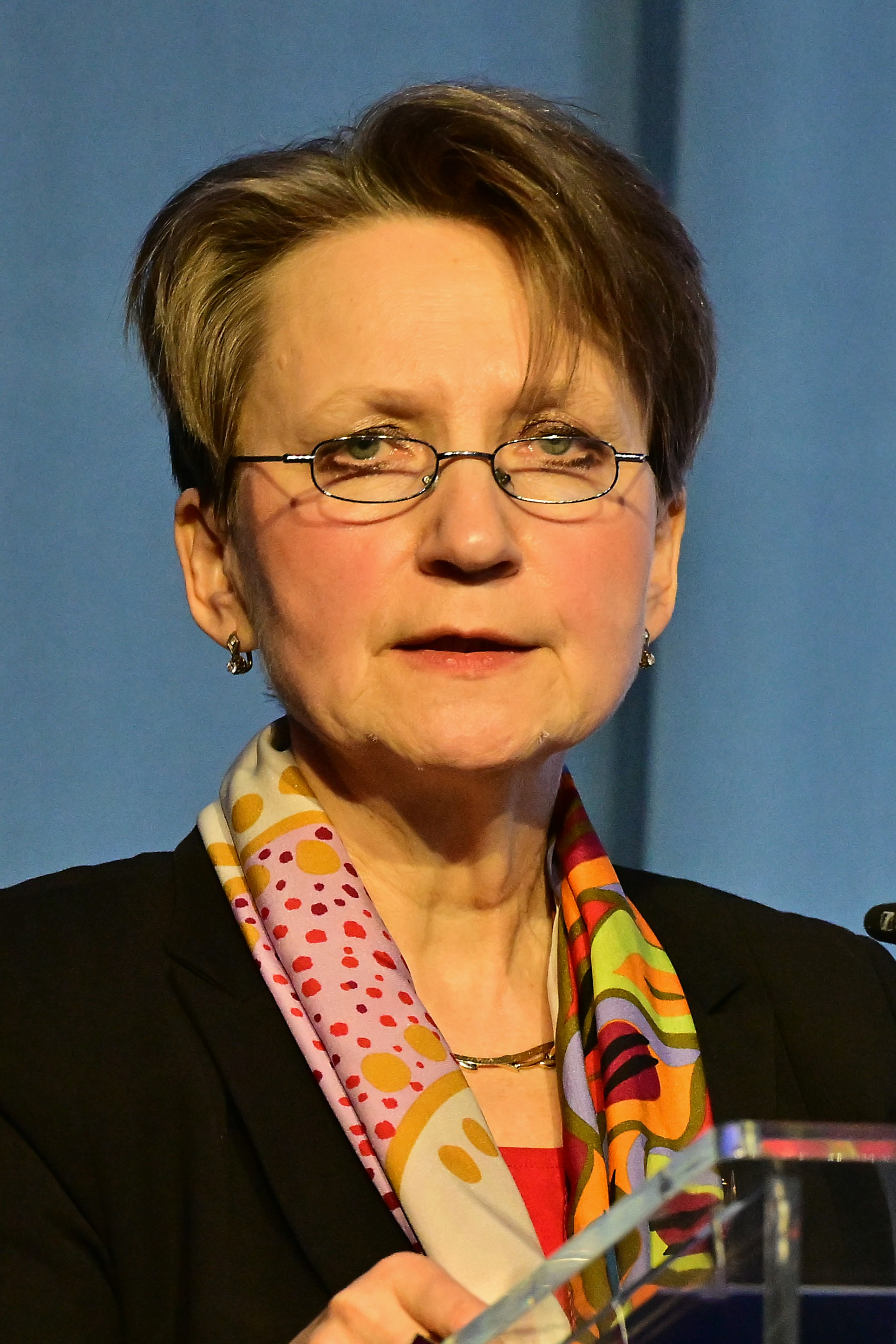
- Born: Belarus
- Education: Belarusian State Medical University
- Occupation: Director of the IAEA's Division of Nuclear Security
- Employer: International Atomic Energy Agency
- Known for: leading the international response to nuclear incidents

Elena Buglova or Yelena Buglova is a Belarusian doctor of medicine. She was the Head of the Incident and Emergency Centre of the International Atomic Energy Agency (IAEA). In 2021, she was promoted to lead the IAEA's Division of Nuclear Security.

== Life ==
Buglova was born and lived as a child in Belarus. She went to university in Minsk at what is now called the Belarusian State Medical University. She became a Belarusian doctor of medicine, and she also has a PhD.

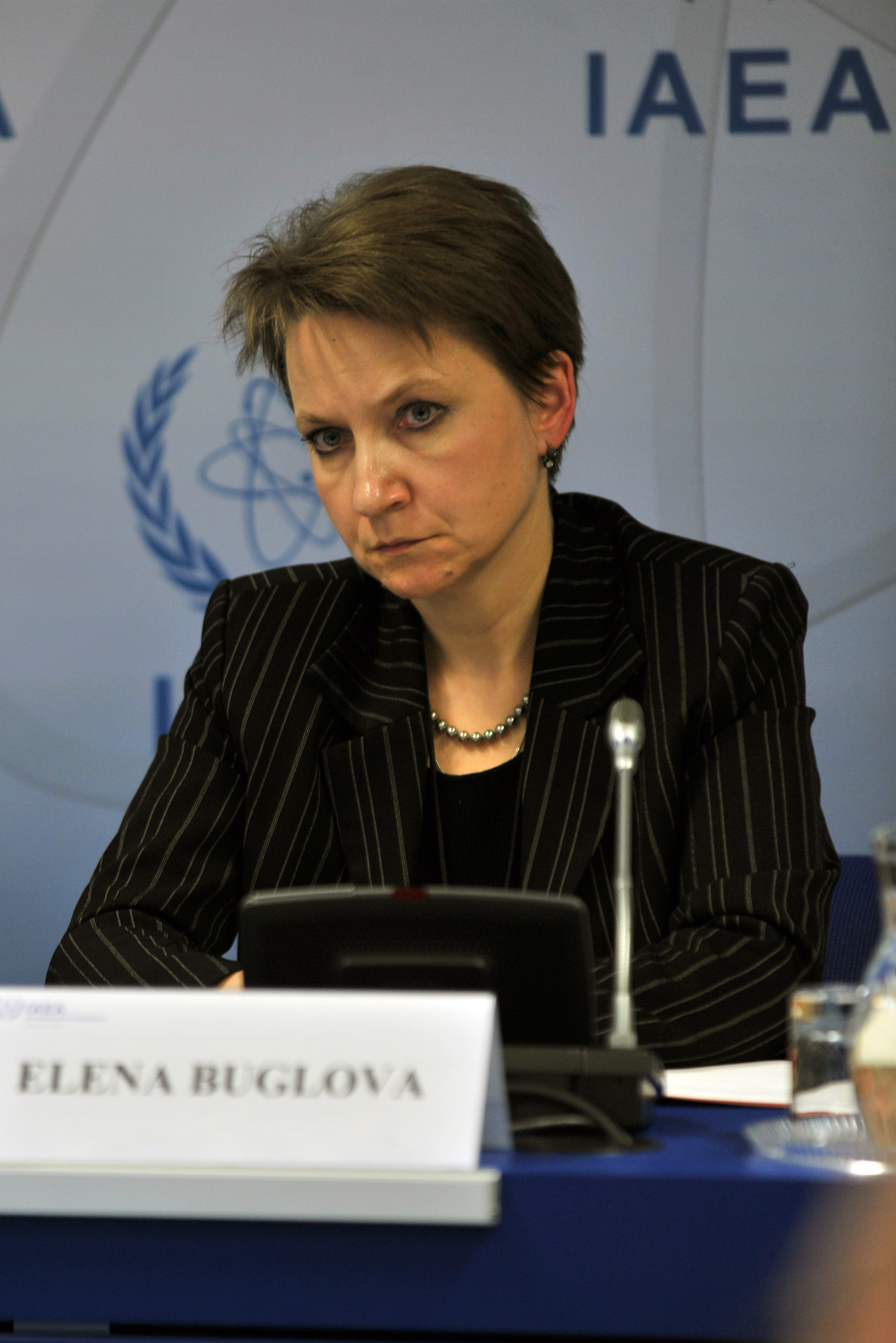
Buglova at the briefing of the Fukushima nuclear accident, 2011

She joined the IAEA in 2002 to lead its Center for Incidents and Emergencies. She had worked till then at Belarus's Institute of Radiation Medicine, where she was involved in steps to monitor and avoid the far-reaching consequences of the accident at Chernobyl. She worked in Chernobyl's exclusion zone and was able to report on safety levels. She said that one woman was not reassured until she saw Buglova demonstrate her findings by drinking a glass of the local milk. She also introduced a national system for the registration of nuclear sources. This was part of a programme to ensure nuclear safety.

Buglova led the IAEA's team after Fukushima Daiichi accident in 2011. The Japanese nuclear plant had an incident after an earthquake and seven metre high tsunami destroyed its power supplies and nuclear material was released. Japan accepted the IAEA's offer of help. The IAEA Director General and Buglova gave a daily press briefing starting on 14 March in Vienna.

At the start of 2021 she was promoted to lead the IAEA's Division of Nuclear Security. In May 2024 she was being quoted in an IAEA press release concerning the disappearance of nuclear material. There had been thousands of reports of lost sources that was mainly due to poor management. However a small proportion involved criminal activity, Buglova and the IAEA called for increased vigilance.
