= Susan Eckey =

Norwegian diplomat

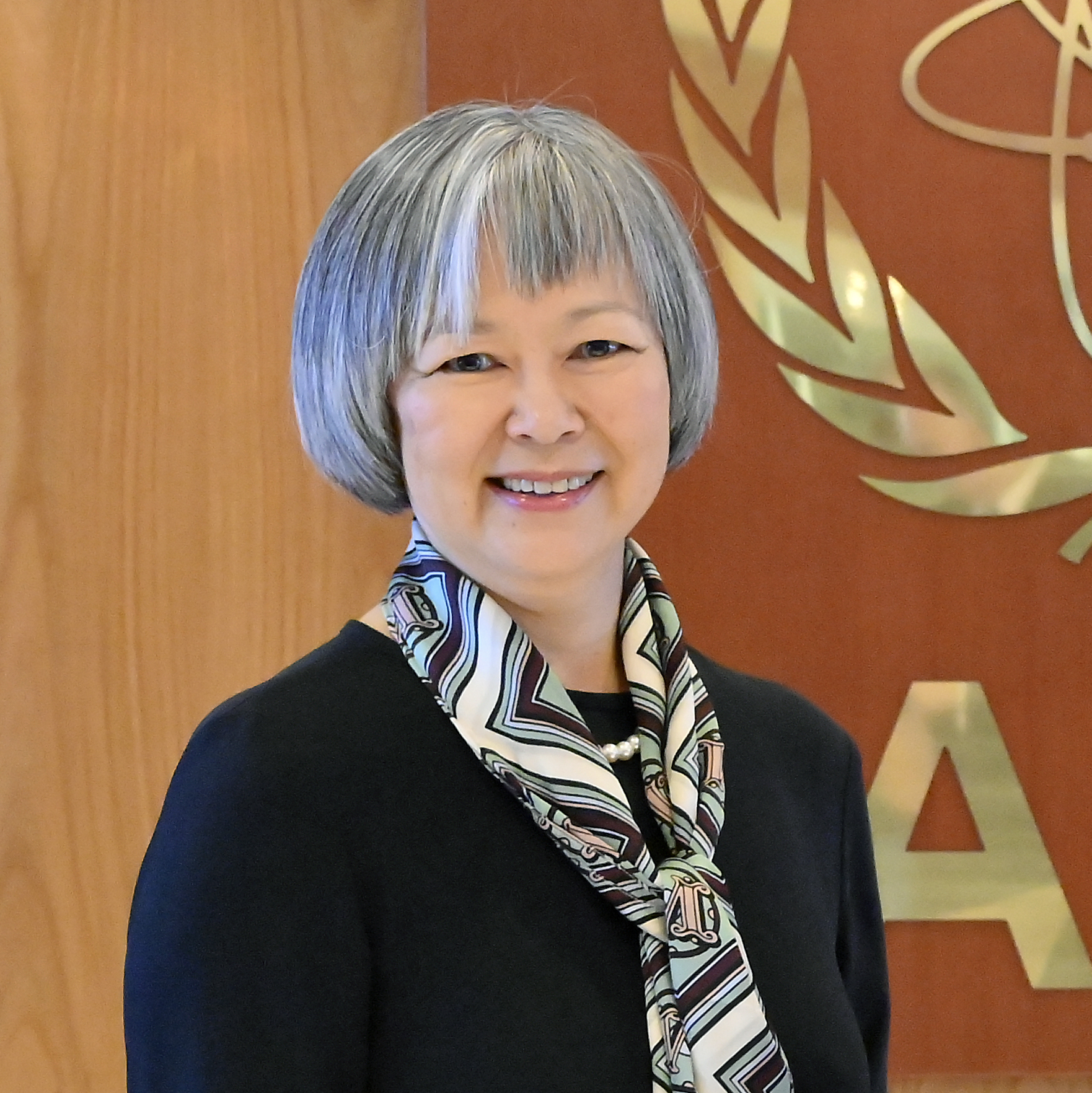
- in 2022 in Vienna
- Born: 22 July 1964 (age 61)
- Education: Norwegian School of Economics
- Known for: Norwegian ambassador

Susan Eckey (born 22 July 1964) is a Norwegian diplomat who since 2022 has been the Ambassador of Norway to Austria, Slovakia and Permanent Representative to the United Nations and other international organisations in Vienna. From 2015 to 2019 she was Ambassador to Uganda, Rwanda and Burundi.

== Life ==
Eckey was born in 1964. She took her masters degree in Science in Economics and Business Administration at the Norwegian School of Economics and an International Baccalaureate Diploma at UWC Lester B. Pearson College in Canada.

She started work at Norway's Ministry of Foreign Affairs in 1991, and she has served at Norwegian diplomatic missions in Chile, New York, Uganda and Austria.

In 2012 she was appointed to the advisory group of the Central Emergency Response Fund (CERF).

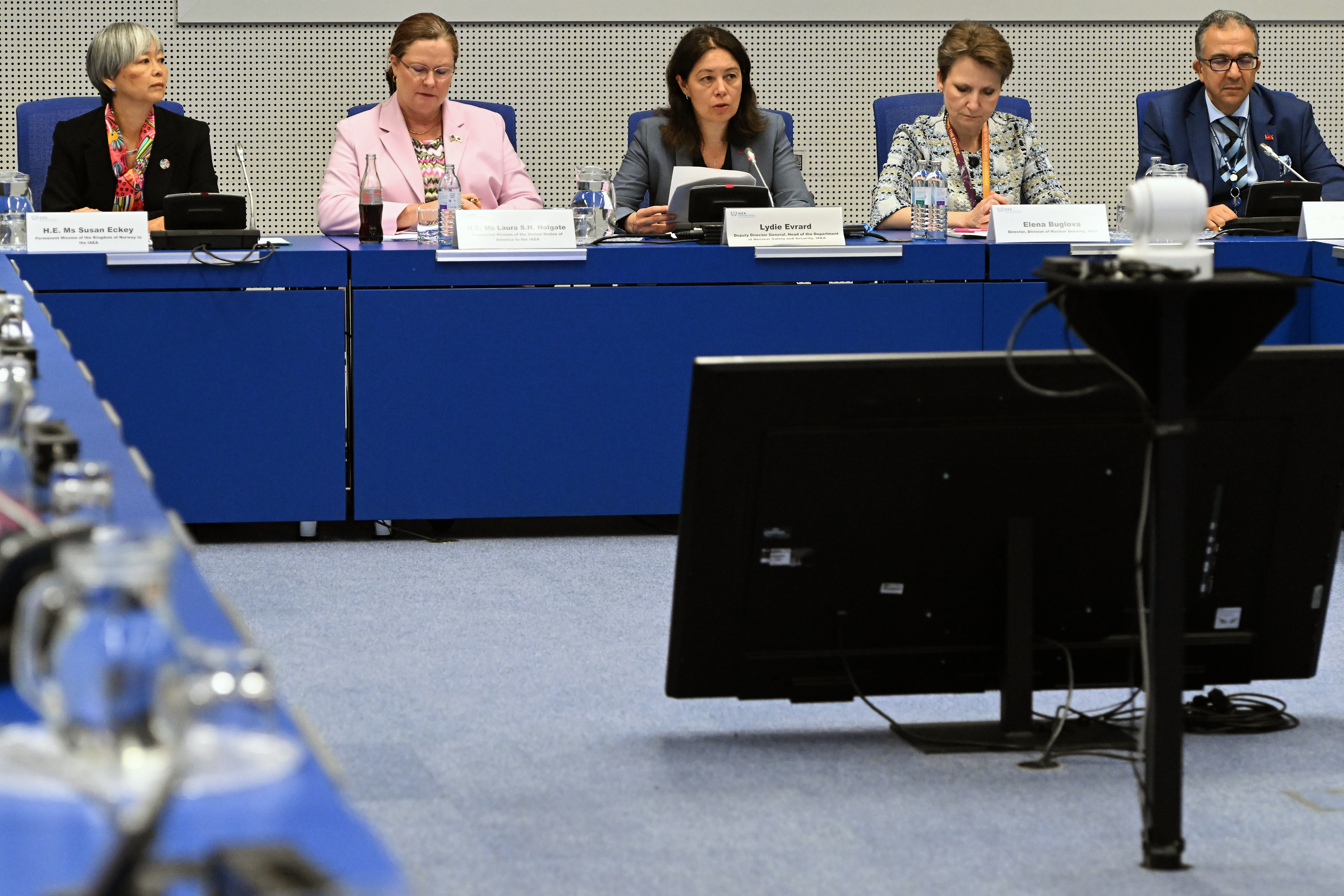
Eckey, Laura Holgate, Lydie Evrard and Elena Buglova at IAEA conference in May 2024

From 2015 to 2019 she was Norway’s Ambassador to Uganda, Rwanda and Burundi based in Kampala, Uganda. She was overseeing Norway’s cooperation with Uganda, including development cooperation programmes, which included energy cooperation, management of natural resources and empowerment of women. From 2019-2020 she was Norway’s ECOSOC Ambassador, and from 2020 to 2022 she served in the Ministry of Foreign Affairs as a Deputy Director General of the Multilateral Department.

Since 2022, Eckey has been in Vienna as Norway’s Ambassador to Austria, Slovakia and Permanent Representative to the United Nations and other international organisations in Vienna, including the International Atomic Energy Agency IAEA and the Comprehensive Nuclear-Test-Ban Treaty Organization (CTBTO).
