= Belarusian State Medical University =

Public university in Minsk, Belarus

- Беларускі дзяржаўны медыцынскі універсітэт
- Motto: Arte et humanitate, labore et scientia.
- Motto in English: Art and humanity, work and knowledge.
- Type: Public
- Established: 1921
- Rector: Rubnikovich Sergej Petrovich
- Academic staff: 888
- Students: 6,513
- Postgraduates: 300
- Location: Minsk, Republic of Belarus
- Colours
- Website: www.bsmu.by

Belarusian State Medical University (Belarusian: Беларускі дзяржаўны медыцынскі універсітэт, BSMU) is a public medical university in Minsk, Belarus. It specialises in medicine and dentistry.

== History ==
The beginning of the university's history dates back to 1921, when it was announced the opening of the Belarusian State University, which at that time included the medical faculty, which was separated in 1930 as an independent educational institution.

In 1930, the Belarusian medical Institute was founded on the basis of the faculty. During the Second World War, from June 1941 to October 1943, the Institute did not function, and then its work resumed in the city of Yaroslavl (Russian Federation). In 1944, the Belarusian medical Institute returned to its former location in the city of Minsk. In 1960, the faculty of dentistry was established.

In 1995, the military medical faculty was established as part of the institute. In September 2011, the faculty of pharmacy was opened.

== Rector ==
From 2020 the Rector is Sergey Rubnikovich, Chief non-staff dentist of the Ministry of Health of the Republic of Belarus, Corresponding member of the National Academy of Sciences of Belarus. He is a founder and head of the scientific school of dentistry using cellular and digital technologies. During the period of his scientific activity, he published more than 750 works, including nine monographs, 35 book editions, 300 articles in leading domestic and foreign publications. He has 50 patents for inventions, more than 250 acts of implementation in practical healthcare and the educational process, the author of 27 user manuals approved by the Ministry of Health.

== International cooperation ==
Over 2000 foreign citizens from more than 50 countries of the world study at BSMU .

In 2022 Belarusian State Medical University received the status of accredited educational institution according to the standards of the World Federation for Medical Education. The specialties “General Medicine”, “Dentistry” and “Pharmacy” have been also accredited according to the WFME standards.

The university is accredited by the IAAR for a maximum period of 5 years and this may be renewed .

A joint Belarusian-Israeli project to train Israeli citizens operates in the university. The project is a 4-year educational program in English based on the International Standard of Medical Education according to the USMLE (United States Medical Licensing Examination) system for applicants - citizens of Israel, USA, UK, Canada with higher education in related medical specialties. Israeli students of a 6-year program also study within the project .

== Alumni ==
- Elena Buglova, Director of the Division of Nuclear Security, IAEA
- Vitaly Herasevich, Researcher at the Mayo Clinic

== Political repressions, sanctions ==
On 21 June 2021, Siarhei Rubnikovich, Rector of the Belarusian State Medical University, was added to the EU-led list of people and organizations sanctioned in relation to human rights violations in Belarus. According to the official decision of the EU, "In his position as the Rector of the Belarusian State Medical University, whose appointment was approved by Alexander Lukashenka, Siarhei Rubnikovich is responsible for the decision of University administration to expel students for taking part in peaceful protests. The expulsion orders were taken following Lukashenka's call on 27 October 2020 for expelling from universities students taking part in protests and strikes."

== Campus ==
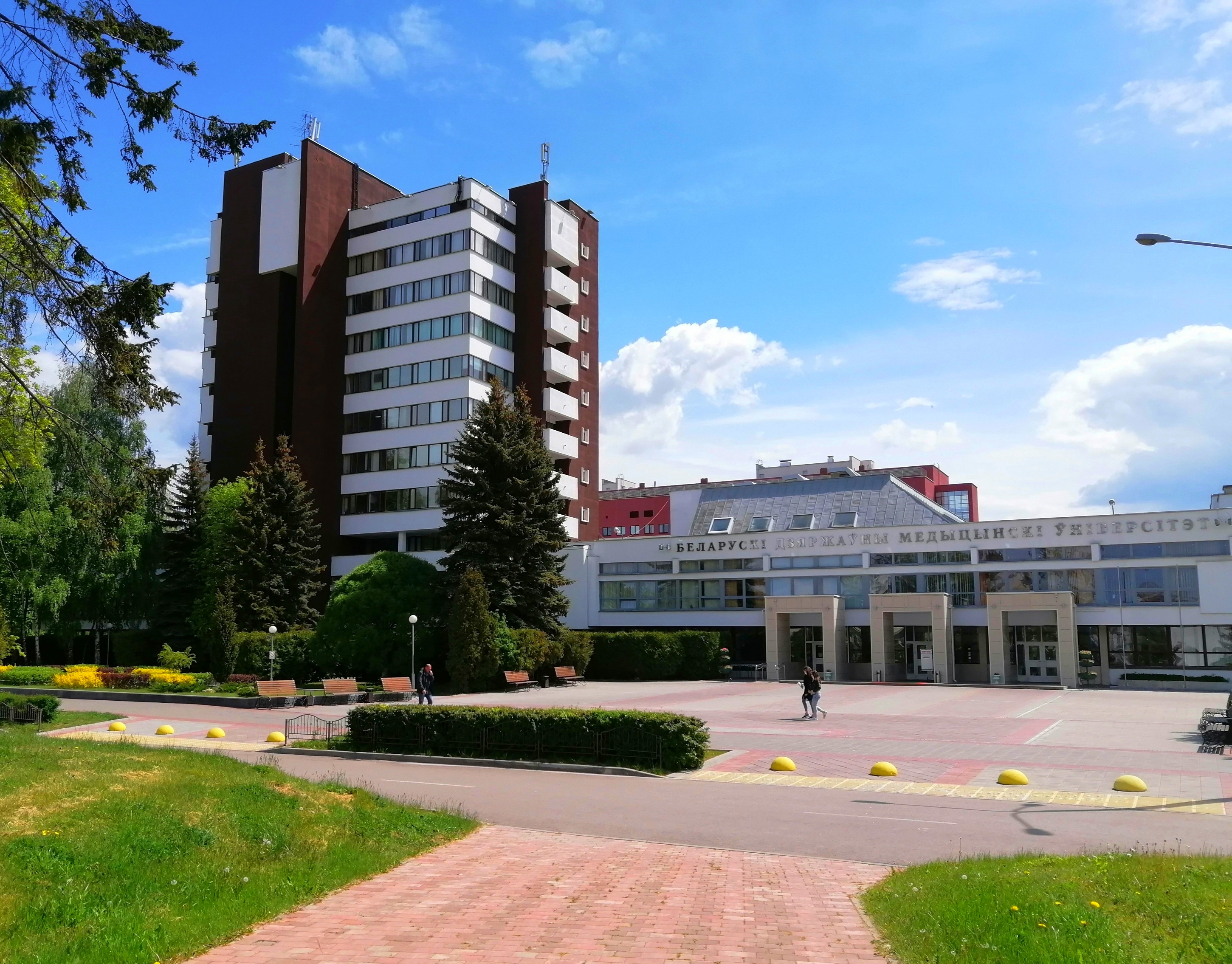
Administrative building

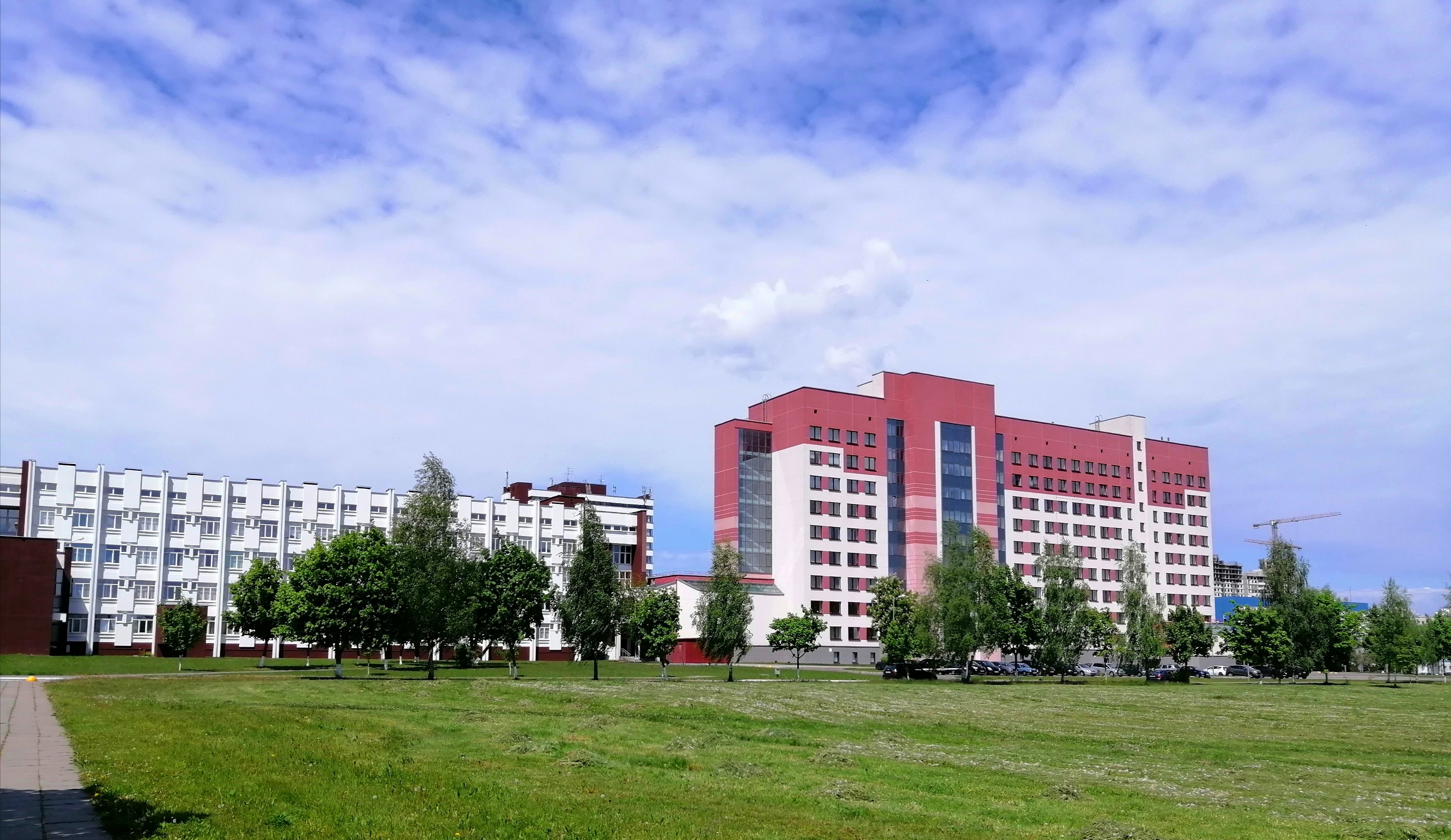
Laboratory building

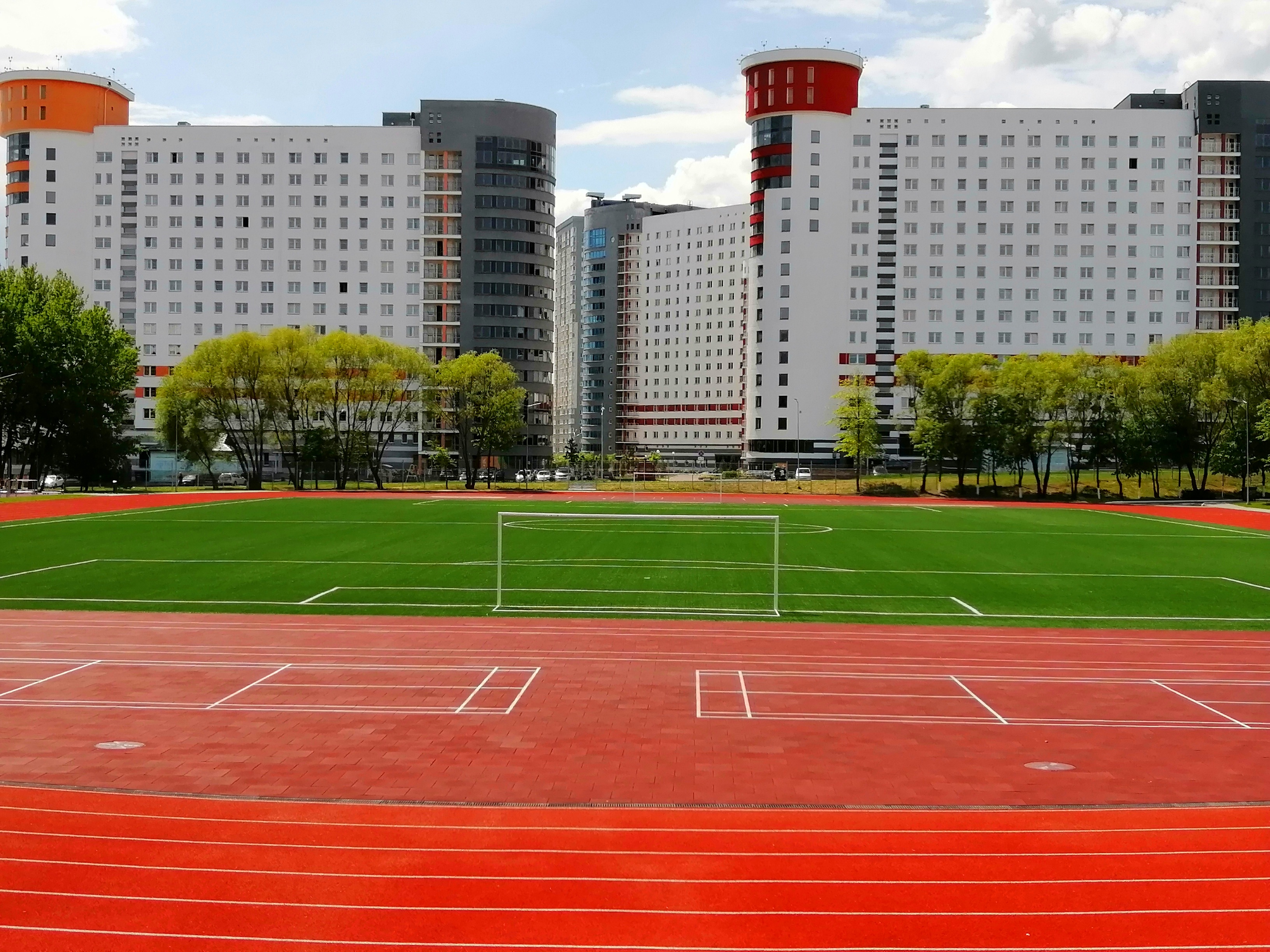
Student residence

== Faculties ==
- Faculty of Pediatrics
- Faculty of General medicine
- Faculty of Military Medicine
- Faculty of Preventive Medicine
- Faculty for International Students
- Faculty of dentistry
- Pharmaceutical faculty
- Faculty of Career Guidance and pre-University Training

== Transport connections ==
- Metro:Pyatrowshchyna (Minsk Metro)0,4 km
- Metro:Malinawka (Minsk Metro) 1,4 km
- Metro:Mikhalova (Minsk Metro) 2.0 km
- Bus: 84, 74c
- Trolleybus: 10, 25
