= Ministry of Digitalisation and Public Governance =

Government ministry of Norway

- Digitaliserings- og forvaltningsdepartementet

Agency overview
- Formed: 1 January 2024
- Jurisdiction: Government of Norway
- Headquarters: Oslo, Norway
- Employees: 130
- Minister responsible: Karianne Tung, Minister of Digitalisation and Public Governance
- Website: Official website

Footnotes
- List of Norwegian ministries

The Ministry of Digitalisation and Public Governance (Norwegian: Digitaliserings- og forvaltningsdepartementet) is a government ministry of Norway. It is responsible for the government's information technology, administrative policy, electronic communication, state employer policy, state building and property management, administrative responsibility for the county governors and work with the United Nations sustainability goals. The ministry was established on 1 January 2024, while the minister position had originally worked for the Ministry of Local Government and Regional Development up until then.

== Organisation ==
The Ministry has about 130 employees, who transferred from the Ministry of Local Government and Regional Development.

=== Departments ===
The Ministry has five underlying departments with different fields of responsibilities.

- State employers' policy
- IT- and administrative policy
- Management and organisation
- Communications
- Public Administration

=== Agencies and businesses ===
A total of 11 agencies and businesses fall under the Ministry's jurisdiction.

- Norid
- Norwegian Agency for Public and Financial Management
- Research Council of Norway
- Norwegian Public Service Pension Fund
- Norwegian Data Protection Authority
- Norwegian Government Security and Service Organisation
- Norwegian Digitalisation Agency
- Norwegian Communications Authority
- Norwegian Directorate of Public Construction and Property
- County Governors
- County Governors' Joint Services
