= Karianne Tung =

Norwegian politician

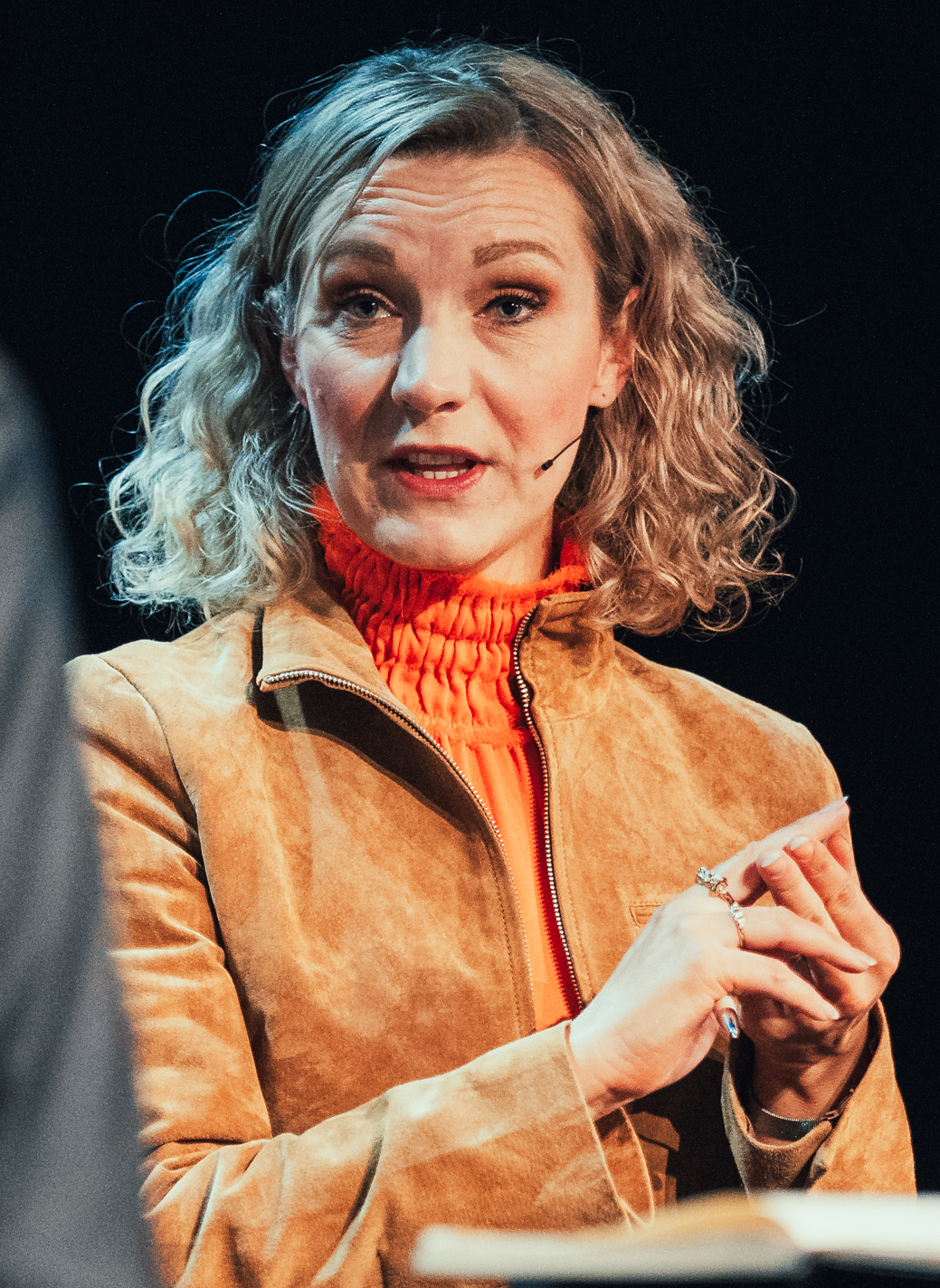
- Tung in 2024

Minister of Digitalisation and Public Governance
- In office 16 October 2023 – 11 September 2026
- Prime Minister: Jonas Gahr Støre
- Preceded by: Linda Hofstad Helleland (2021)
- Succeeded by: Torgeir Micaelsen

Member of the Storting
- In office 1 October 2013 – 30 September 2017
- Constituency: Sør-Trøndelag

Personal details
- Born: 21 January 1984 (age 42)
- Party: Labour
- Children: 1

Karianne Oldernes Tung (born 21 January 1984) is a Norwegian politician for the Labour Party. She served as the Minister of Digitalisation and Public Governance from 2023 to 2026. Previously she was a member of the Storting for Sør-Trøndelag from 2013 to 2017.

== Political career ==
=== Local politics ===
She was a member of the Rissa municipal council between 2003 and 2011 and later the Sør-Trøndalag county council for six years. She has worked particularly with educational issues.

Between 2017 and 2018, she was the leader of the unified Trøndelag county chapter of the Labour Party.

=== Parliament ===
She was elected to the Storting for Sør-Trøndelag in 2013.

In Parliament, she was a member of the Standing Committee on Health and Care Services from 2013 to 2015 and the Standing Committee on Transport and Communications from 2015 to 2017.

In 2016, she announced that she wouldn't seek re-election at the 2017 election, citing that she wanted to focus on her family.

=== Minister of Digitalisation ===
Tung was appointed minister of digitalisation in a cabinet reshuffle on 16 October 2023. At the same time it was announced that she would head a new ministry, the Ministry of Digitalisation and Public Governance starting 1 January 2024, with 130 staff transferring from the Ministry of Local Government and Regional Development.

==== 2023 ====
After Sparebank 1 Østlandet had used an AI generated image in an advertisement online, Tung commented that the use of AI imagery has to be within the bounds of the law, particularly in regards to equality, discrimination and marketing. According to her, the government would be working on a digitalisation strategy about how AI should be regulated, developed and utilised.

In late October, a fake X account in her name was utilised to announce the death of former prime minister Gro Harlem Brundtland, which in itself was also fake.

In November, she stated that workplaces that would see more digitalisation take over responsibilities would not infringe on people working. She further stated that the dynamic would not add up if it weren't for human participation in the workplace.

==== 2024 ====
In January, she expressed the desire to get the European Union's new act on artificial intelligence passed in Norway as soon as possible. The Liberal Party notably expressed their support for the action.

Tung announced in late February that the government would be keeping the current structure for county governors despite several counties being re-established from mergers. This would notably include the transference of some county offices to new locations and a name change for the county governor of Viken, to one for Østfold, Buskerud, Oslo and Akershus.

In April, she announced that the government would want 80% of the public sector to utilise on artificial intelligence by 2025. She hailed it a tool to help the sector improve and renew, and highlighted the need to make more room for jobs more important. She did however concede that there wouldn't be a universal strategy in this aim. Her proposal was met with skepticism from experts, who called the objective "unrealistic" and cited that it would require more financing, competence and more clearer political aims.

Tung announced in early June that she would be asking for a meeting with Meta and for them to give a detailed account about their plans to utilise Facebook and Instagram posts to train artificial intelligence. She added that Meta should be more considerable with users' privacy on all of their platforms. She later praised their decision to halt their implementation of AI on these platforms later that month. Tung emphasised that she expected Meta to offer a "real and simple solution for users" and "regulation where companies have too much power".

In September, she attended the G20 minister summit on digital economy in Maceió, Brazil as Norway was granted to be a guest member. She outlined Norway's goals as contributing to "a more inclusive and responsible digital future" and that the meeting's declaration would "help secure Norwegian interests in cooperating with the G20 countries".

She and education minister Kari Nessa Nordtun met representatives of technology companies Google, Meta, Snapchat and TikTok in December to discuss how to best protect children on social media and age restrictions on their platforms. Norwegian media reported that there were tensions between the ministers and the representatives at times during the meeting. Tung emphasised that the government would seek to increase the age restriction on the platforms from 13 to 15 and that they were preliminarily looking at getting the change in place by 2025 or 2026.

==== 2025 ====
In March, she expressed that the government would be aiming to implement the EU's AI Act and also introduce a Norwegian law specialising in AI to go alongside it. Tung stated that they were hoping to implement the Norwegian law by the summer of 2026. She also emphasised the importance of keeping up in the AI sector in order to uphold competition with the rest of Europe and that Norwegian businesses should utilise AI more.

In early June, Tung emphasised the importance of producers labelling products that might contain or include AI generated imagery to make customers aware of this. Her comments came in the wake of several reports being made of products in stores being sold with displayed imagery that were suspected of being AI generated.

In the wake of revelations that First Waps' surveillance equipment had been used to track people across the Norwegian telecom system, Tung emphasised in October, the importance of having secure telecom systems and conceded that the case "serves as a reminder that we live in a dangerous world". She also condemned the actions of First Waps.

==== 2026 ====
Upon the government announcing their proposal to set an age limit to social media platforms at 16 years old in April, Tung warned that tech companies would be fined and sanctioned if they didn't obeyed by Norwegian law. She also expressed that the government expects the companies to "behave" regarding their regulations.

She and fellow minister Lene Vågslid met with representatives of tech companies two months later to discuss how the law would be upheld upon coming into effect by early 2027. Meta's Nordic Public Policy Manager Laura Carstens, who attended the meeting, was critical of the lack of clarity from the government about how the companies are expected to verify minors' age on their platforms. Tung argued that "it should be more about the willpower and not just wanting to protect children" from the companies' perspective. Furthermore, she expressed appreciation for the companies' willingness to follow the law once it would be implemented, but warned the government would not act naivily, and additionally highlighting the importance of ensuring similar functions of the law akin to the EU's Digital Services Act.

She left the government in a cabinet reshuffle on 11 September 2026.

== Civic career ==
Tung was a senior advisor at NTNU between 2018 and 2020.

In 2020, Tung became the manager of Trondheim Tech Port. Following her ministerial appointment, May Britt Hansen was appointed as her successor in March 2024.

== Personal life ==
Tung is married and has one daughter. The family resided in Lerkendal before moving to Nardo.

Political offices
| Vacant Title last held by Linda Hofstad Helleland | Minister of Digitalisation and Public Governance; 2023–2026 | Succeeded by Torgeir Micaelsen |
