= Central Emergency Response Fund =

Humanitarian fund established by the United Nations General Assembly

The Central Emergency Response Fund (French: Fonds central d'intervention d'urgence, CERF/FCIU) is a humanitarian fund established by the United Nations General Assembly on 15 December 2005 and launched in March 2006. With CERF's objectives to 1) promote early action and response to reduce loss of life; 2) enhance response to time-critical requirements; and 3) strengthen core elements of humanitarian response in underfunded crises, CERF seeks to enable more timely and reliable humanitarian assistance to those affected by natural disasters and armed conflicts.

The fund is replenished annually through contributions from governments, the private sector, foundations and individuals. From the fund's inception till August 2013, donors include 125 Member States and more than 30 private donors and regional authorities.

== History and background ==
CERF was created by all nations, for all potential victims of disasters. It represents a real chance to provide predictable and equitable funding to those affected by natural disasters and other humanitarian emergencies.

The fund was established to upgrade the Central Emergency Revolving Fund by including a grant element. CERF has a grant facility of US$450 million and a loan facility of $30 million. The CERF grant component has two windows: one for rapid responses and one for underfunded emergencies.

CERF is intended to complement – not to substitute – existing humanitarian funding mechanisms, such as the United Nations Consolidated Appeals. CERF provides seed funds to jump-start critical operations and fund life-saving programmes not yet covered by other donors. In this way, CERF assures that the funds will go where they are most needed in the network of international aid organizations, which include the United Nations Children's Fund (UNICEF), the United Nations High Commissioner for Refugees (UNHCR), the World Food Programme (WFP) and the World Health Organization (WHO), among others.

== Management ==
CERF is managed, on behalf of the United Nations Secretary-General, by the Under-Secretary-General (USG) and Emergency Relief Coordinator (ERC), Head of the United Nations Office for the Coordination of Humanitarian Affairs Office for the Coordination of Humanitarian Affairs (OCHA).

OCHA is the part of the United Nations Secretariat responsible for bringing together humanitarian actors to ensure a coherent response to emergencies. CERF is a vital component of this effort.

Lisa Doughten is the Chief of the CERF secretariat. Before coming to CERF, Doughten has worked in more than 30 countries in Africa, Asia, Europe, Latin America and the Middle East in both the United Nations and the private sector.

== Advisory Group ==
The CERF Advisory Group provides the Secretary-General with periodic policy guidance and expert advice on the use and impact of CERF. Advisory Group members serve in their individual capacity and not as representatives of their countries or governments. They include government officials from contributing and recipient countries, representatives of humanitarian non-governmental organizations and academic experts, whom are carefully selected to reflect a geographical and gender balance.

As of December 2022, the CERF Advisory Group consists of:

- Caecilia Wijgers (The Netherlands)
- Sarah Charles (United States)
- Hilde Salvesen (Norway)
- James Chiusiwa (Malawi)
- Dmitry Chumakov (Russia)
- Deborah Collins (New Zealand)
- Elissa Golberg (Canada)
- Zeinabou Hadari (Niger)
- Cristian Torres (Ecuador)
- Hesham Huwisa (Libya)
- Aqeel Jamaan Al Ghamdi (Saudi Arabia)
- Mohamed Methqal (Morocco)
- Hyunjoo Oh (South Korea)
- Carl Skau (Sweden)
- Matthew Wyatt (United Kingdom)
- Susanne Fries-Gaier (Germany)
- Maria Jose del Aguila Castillo (Guatemala)
- Shaheen Ali Al-Kaabi (Qatar)
- Zvinechimwe R. Churu (Zimbabwe)

== Impact ==
As crises proliferate worldwide, the CERF secretariat continues to receive more requests for funding than before. In 2012, CERF disbursed $485 million for 546 projects in 49 countries and territories – this is the highest amount since the fund's inception. The ten largest recipients were South Sudan, Pakistan, the Syrian Arab Republic, the Democratic Republic of Congo, Niger, Yemen, Sudan, Myanmar, Burkina Faso and Chad, whereas the food, health, and water and sanitation (WASH) sectors continued to be among the most highly funded sectors, receiving approximately $247 million, or nearly 52 per cent, of the $477 million CERF allocated in 2012.

== Allocations ==
The CERF grant element is divided into two windows: one for Rapid Responses (approximately two thirds of the grant element) and the other for Underfunded Emergencies (approximately one third of the grant element). The grant element pools funds from several donors and adopts a decentralized, field-based approach to decision-making.

The Rapid Response window provides funds intended to mitigate the unevenness and delays of the voluntary contribution system by providing seed money for life-saving, humanitarian activities in the initial days and weeks of a sudden onset crisis or a deterioration in an ongoing situation. In parallel to the CERF Rapid Response grant, agencies will be looking for others sources of funding to complement the CERF funds. The maximum amount applied to a crisis in a given year typically does not exceed $30 million, although higher allocations can be made in exceptional circumstances.

The Underfunded Emergencies window supports countries that are significantly challenged by "forgotten" emergencies. With technical support from the CERF secretariat, the ERC selects countries to benefit from the CERF underfunded emergencies window. The ERC also decides on an allocation amount per country and makes recommendations on the use of underfunded emergencies grants in selected countries.

== Contributions ==
Despite the 2008 financial crisis and its effects on member states' budgets, donations to CERF have increased compared to earlier years. Since 2006, CERF has received more than $3.2 billion in contributions and pledges. Close to 99 per cent of the contributions were from Member States, with the United Kingdom, Sweden and Norway being the top three donors to CERF up to 2013.

== See also ==
- Office for the Coordination of Humanitarian Affairs
- United Nations
