= European political alliance =

Alliance of national parties operating at the level of the European Union and Europe

A European political alliance is an entity operating transnationally in Europe, especially across the member states of the European Union. (Note: Regulation 1141/2014 of the European Parliament and of the Council on the statute and funding of European political parties and European political foundations defines a political alliance as a "structured cooperation between political parties and/or citizens") European political alliances differ by their level of integration, their role, and their membership. European political alliances encompass European political parties, Political groups of the European Parliament, other party groups, as well as various entities informally referred to as "political organisations", "political movements", or "transnational parties", and sometimes erroneously as "European parties".

== European political parties ==
A European political party is a type of political party operating transnationally in Europe and within EU institutions. They are regulated and funded by EU Regulation 1141/2014 on the statute and funding of European political parties and European political foundations, and their operations are supervised by the Authority for European Political Parties and European Political Foundations (APPF), with which they are required to register.

European political parties – mostly consisting of national member parties, and few individual members – have the right to campaign during the European elections, for which they often adopt manifestos outlining their positions and ambitions.

European parties influence the decision-making process of the European Council through coordination meetings with their affiliated heads of state and government. They also work closely with their members in the European Commission.

=== Current European political parties ===
As of October 2024, there are twelve European political parties registered with the APPF:

European political party							Politics			Members in		
Name	Abbr.	President	Secretary-General	Founded	Political group	Political foundation	Position	Ideology	European integration	Parliament	Commission	Council
European People's Party	EPP	Manfred Weber (DE)	Dolors Montserrat (ES)	1976	EPP	WMCES	Centre-right	Christian democracy; Conservatism	Pro-European	184 / 720 (26%)	11 / 27 (41%)	11 / 27 (41%)
Party of European Socialists	PES	Stefan Löfven (SE)	Giacomo Filibeck (IT)	1973	S&D	FEPS	Centre-left	Social democracy	Pro-European	135 / 720 (19%)	4 / 27 (15%)	3 / 27 (11%)
Patriots.eu	Patriots	Santiago Abascal (ES)		2014	PfE	PfEF	Right-wing to far-right	National conservatism; Right-wing populism	Eurosceptic	83 / 720 (12%)	0 / 27 (0%)	2 / 27 (7%)
European Conservatives and Reformists Party	ECR	Mateusz Morawiecki (PL)	Antonio Giordano (IT)	2009	ECR	ND	Right-wing to far-right	Conservatism; National conservatism; Economic liberalism	Soft Eurosceptic	68 / 720 (9%)	1 / 27 (4%)	1 / 27 (4%)
Alliance of Liberals and Democrats for Europe Party	ALDE	Svenja Hahn (DE)	Didrik de Schaetzen	1976	Renew	ELF	Centre to centre-right	Liberalism	Pro-European	55 / 720 (8%)	5 / 27 (19%)	4 / 27 (15%)
European Green Party	EGP	Vula Tsetsi (GR); Ciarán Cuffe (IE)	Benedetta De Marte (IT)	2004	Greens/EFA	GEF	Centre-left to left-wing	Green politics	Pro-European	50 / 720 (7%)	0 / 27 (0%)	0 / 27 (0%)
Europe of Sovereign Nations	ESN	Stanislav Stoyanov (BG)		2024	ESN	SF	Far-right	Ultranationalism; Ultraconservatism; Right-wing populism	Hard Eurosceptic	26 / 720 (4%)	0 / 27 (0%)	0 / 27 (0%)
European Left Alliance for the People and the Planet	ELA	Malin Björk (SE); Catarina Martins (PT)	Adrien Le Louarn (FR)	2024	The Left	FTP	Left-wing	Democratic socialism; Eco-socialism	Soft Eurosceptic	20 / 720 (3%)	0 / 27 (0%)	0 / 27 (0%)
Party of the European Left	EL	Walter Baier (AT)		2004	The Left	TE	Left-wing to far-left	Democratic socialism; Communism	Soft Eurosceptic	17 / 720 (2%)	0 / 27 (0%)	0 / 27 (0%)
European Democratic Party	EDP	François Bayrou (FR)	Sandro Gozi (IT)	2004	Renew	IED	Centre	Centrism	Pro-European	10 / 720 (1%)	0 / 27 (0%)	0 / 27 (0%)
European Free Alliance	EFA	Lorena López de Lacalle Arizti (ES)	Jordi Solé (ES)	1981	Greens/EFA, ECR	Coppieters	Big tent	Regionalism; Separatism; Ethnic minority interests	Pro-European	8 / 720 (1%)	0 / 27 (0%)	1 / 27 (4%)
European Christian Political Party	ECPP	Valeriu Ghilețchi (MD, RO)	Maarten van de Fliert (NL)	2002	ECR, EPP	Sallux	Right-wing	Christian right; Social conservatism	Soft Eurosceptic	7 / 720 (1%)	0 / 27 (0%)	0 / 27 (0%)

=== Former European political parties ===
The entities below were formerly registered with the APPF.

European political party		Timeline		Politics			
Name	Abbr.	Founded	Removed from register	Position	Ideology	European integration	Political Group
Alliance of European National Movements	AENM	2009	2018	Far-right	Ultranationalism; Right-wing populism	Hard Euroscepticism	NI
Alliance for Peace and Freedom	APF	2015	2018	Far-right	Ultranationalism, Neo-fascism	Hard Euroscepticism	NI

The entities below qualified at some point for European public funding; however, they were never registered with the APPF.

European political party		Timeline			Politics		
Name	Abbr.	Founded	Dissolved	Received European public funding	Ideology	European integration	Political Group
Alliance for Direct Democracy in Europe	ADDE	2014	2017	2015, qualified in 2016-17 but did not receive funding (Note: The note of the Secretary-General of the European Parliament on the 2016 final reports of political parties and foundations at European level states that the ADDE was "under dissolution procedure since 26/04/2017" and that, "ADDE was awarded a grant for the financial year 2016 and was obliged to submit the 2016 final report by 30 June 2017. The party did not comply with this obligation." As a result, the note proposes "that the Bureau initiates the two procedures for termination of the 2016 grant decisions for the ADDE party and its affiliated foundation IDDE." With regard to the grant for 2017, the note indicates that "as a result [of the dissolution procedure], the Bureau initiated the termination procedure of the 2017 grant decision for ADDE pursuant to Article 11.9.2 (e) of the grant award decision. The Bureau confirmed on 1 November 2017 that the termination procedure shall be continued.")	Direct democracy National conservatism Right-wing populism	Euroscepticism	Europe of Freedom and Direct Democracy
Alliance of Independent Democrats in Europe	ADIE	2005	2008	2006–2008	Right-wing populism National conservatism	Hard Euroscepticism	Independence and Democracy
Alliance for Europe of the Nations	AEN	2002	2009	2004–2009	Conservatism; National conservatism	Hard Euroscepticism	Union for Europe of the Nations
Coalition for Life and Family	CVF	2016		Qualified in 2017 but did not receive funding (Note: The note of the Secretary-General of the European Parliament on the 2017 final reports of political parties and foundations at European level states that "one party and one foundation, for which the pre-financing has not been paid, have neither cooperated with the external auditor nor submitted a final report for the financial year 2017. All attempts of the European Parliament services to contact the respective beneficiaries remained unsuccessful. It appears that the two entities ceased their activities. Considering the circumstances and the non-cooperation with the European Parliament it is proposed that the Bureau sets the final grant amount to zero." Later, it concludes that "for all 22 beneficiaries mentioned in this note (except for EUD, CVF and FP) [...] it is therefore proposed to approve the final reports." Since EUD had waived its request for a grant, this only leaves Coalition pour la vie et la famille (CVF) and its affiliated Pegasus Foundation (FP) as the "one party and one foundation" referred to above. Annex 1 of the note confirms that no pre-financing had been paid to these two entities.)	Social conservatism Political Catholicism; Nationalism; Reactionarism		
European Alliance for Freedom	EAF	2010	2016	2011–2016	Sovereigntism; Right-wing populism Nationalism	Euroscepticism	Europe of Nations and Freedom
Europeans United for Democracy	EUD	2005	2017	2006–2016, qualified in 2017 but did not receive funding (Note: The note of the Secretary-General of the European Parliament on the 2017 final reports of political parties and foundations at European level states that, "subject to dissolution procedure, the party [had] waived the 2017 grant.")	Soft Euroscepticism	Euroscepticism	Independence and Democracy; European Conservatives and Reformists Group; The Left
Libertas		2008	2010	Qualified in 2009 but did not receive funding (Note: The note of the Secretary-General of the European Parliament on the 2009 final reports of political parties and foundations at European level states that "an initial positive decision on the tenth applicant, the Libertas Party Limited was later suspended; consequently a grant agreement was never signed.")	Anti-Lisbon Treaty	Euroscepticism	Europe of Freedom and Democracy
Movement for a Europe of Liberties and Democracy	MELD	2011	2015	2012–2015	National conservatism Right-wing populism	Euroscepticism	Europe of Freedom and Democracy

== Political groups of the European Parliament ==
The political groups of the European Parliament are the officially recognised parliamentary groups consisting of legislators of aligned ideologies in the European Parliament. Each political group is assumed to have a set of core principles, and political groups that cannot demonstrate this may be disbanded.

A political group of the EP usually constitutes the formal parliamentary representation of one or two of the European political parties, sometimes supplemented by members from other national political parties or independent politicians. It is strictly forbidden for political groups to organise or finance political campaigns during European elections, since this is the exclusive responsibility of the parties.

Political group	European political parties	MEPs
European People's Party Group (EPP Group)	European People's Party (EPP); European Christian Political Party (ECPP)	185 / 720 (26%)
Progressive Alliance of Socialists and Democrats (S&D)	Party of European Socialists (PES)	135 / 720 (19%)
Patriots for Europe (PfE)	Patriots.eu	85 / 720 (12%)
European Conservatives and Reformists Group (ECR Group)	European Conservatives and Reformists Party (ECR); European Free Alliance (EFA); European Christian Political Party (ECPP)	81 / 720 (11%)
Renew Europe (Renew)	Alliance of Liberals and Democrats for Europe Party (ALDE Party); European Democratic Party (EDP)	77 / 720 (11%)
Greens/European Free Alliance (Greens/EFA)	European Green Party (EGP); European Free Alliance (EFA)	53 / 720 (7%)
The Left in the European Parliament (The Left)	European Left Alliance for the People and the Planet (ELA); Party of the European Left (PEL)	46 / 720 (6%)
Europe of Sovereign Nations Group (ESN)	Europe of Sovereign Nations (ESN)	27 / 720 (4%)
Non-attached members (Non-Inscrits)		30 / 720 (4%)
Vacant		1 / 720

== Political groups of the Parliamentary Assembly of the Council of Europe ==
The Parliamentary Assembly of the Council of Europe (PACE) is the parliamentary arm of the Council of Europe, a 46-nation international organisation dedicated to upholding human rights, democracy and the rule of law.

The Assembly has six political groups.

Group	Chairman	Seats
Socialists, Democrats and Greens Group (SOC)	Frank Schwabe (Germany)	159 / 575
Group of the European People's Party (EPP/CD)	Pablo Hispán (Spain)	136 / 575
European Conservatives, Patriots & Affiliates (ECPA)	Zsolt Németh (Hungary)	115 / 575
Alliance of Liberals and Democrats for Europe (ALDE)	Iulian Bulai (Romania)	86 / 575
Group of the Unified European Left (UEL)	Laura Castel (Spain); Andrej Hunko (Germany)	37 / 575
Members not belonging to a Political Group (NR)		42 / 575

== Party Groups in the Nordic Council ==
The Nordic Council is the official body for formal inter-parliamentary Nordic cooperation among the Nordic countries. Formed in 1952, it has 87 representatives from Denmark, Finland, Iceland, Norway, and Sweden as well as from the autonomous areas of the Faroe Islands, Greenland, and Åland. The representatives are members of parliament in their respective countries or areas and are elected by those parliaments.

The Nordic Council comprises the following party groups:

Name	Abbr.	Founded	Ideology	Political Group	Nordic Council
Centre Group	MG	1983	Liberalism; Christian democracy Green politics Agrarianism (Nordic)	Renew, Greens/EFA, EPP Group	24 / 87
Conservative Group			Conservatism; Liberal conservatism Economic liberalism	EPP Group	13 / 87
Nordic Freedom	NF	2012	Right-wing populism National conservatism Euroscepticism	ECR, PfE	8 / 87
Nordic Green Left Alliance	NGLA	2004	Democratic socialism Eco-socialism; Popular socialism Socialism; Environmentalism; Feminism; Progressivism	The Left, Greens/EFA	11 / 87
The Social Democratic Group	S-Norden		Social democracy	S&D	26 / 87

== Party Groups in the Benelux Parliament ==
The Benelux Parliament (officially known as the Benelux Interparliamentary Assembly) is one of the institutions of the Benelux economic union. The Parliament was established by an agreement signed by Belgium, the Netherlands and Luxembourg in 1955, and provides the governments with advice on economic and cross-frontier cooperation.

The members of the Benelux Parliament are divided into four political groups. The Christian group includes members of CD&V, the CSP, Les Engagés (LE), and the N-VA from Belgium; the BBB, the CDA, the Christian Union (CU), and OPNL from the Netherlands; and the CSV and the ADR from Luxembourg. The Socialists, Greens and Democrats (SGD) group includes members of Vooruit and the PS from Belgium; GroenLinks–PvdA (GL–PvdA) and the SP from the Netherlands; and The Greens (DG) and the LSAP from Luxembourg. The Liberal group includes members of the MR from Belgium; the VVD and D66 from the Netherlands; and the DP from Luxembourg. Vlaams Belang (VB) from Belgium and the PVV from the Netherlands form their own joint group.

The PVDA-PTB from Belgium does not belong to any group. In the past, FVD, JA21, and the PvdD from the Netherlands were not part of any group.

Political groups in the Benelux Parliament
Name	Parliamentary leader	Ideologies	Seats
Christian Group	Theo Bovens	Christian democracy Conservatism	17 / 49
Liberal Group	Jan Schoonis	Liberalism	14 / 49
Socialists, Greens and Democrats	Patrick Prévot	Social democracy Green politics Democratic socialism	10 / 49
Vlaams Belang–Party for Freedom	Barbara Pas	Nationalism; Right-wing populism	7 / 49
Non-attached members	—	—	1 / 49

== Other political entities ==
The entities below are alliances or networks of national entities and operate across borders. Some of them refer to themselves as European parties, but they are not European political parties in the sense of Regulation 1141/2014 and never qualified for European public funding.

=== Alliances with Members in the European Parliament ===
Name	Abbr.	Founded	Ideology	Political Group	Seats	Notes
Animal Politics EU	APEU	2014	Animal rights Animal welfare	The Left	2 / 720 (0.3%)	Electoral platform of animal rights parties
European Communist Action	ECA	2023	Communism; Marxism–Leninism	Non-Inscrits	2 / 720 (0.3%)	Alliance of Marxist–Leninist parties, successor to the Initiative of Communist and Workers' Parties
European Pirate Party	PPEU	2014	Pirate politics Freedom of information Participatory democracy Pro-Europeanism	Greens/EFA	1 / 720 (0.1%)	Organisation of Pirate Parties
Volt Europa	Volt	2017	European federalism Social liberalism Progressivism; Pro-Europeanism	Greens/EFA	5 / 720 (0.7%)	Organisation of pro-European and European federalist political organisations and parties using the same name and branding in all EU member states and several non-EU states

=== Other currently active transnational alliances ===
Name	Abbr.	Founded	Ideology	Political Group	Notes
Central-Eastern European Green Left Alliance	CEEGLA	2024	Democratic socialism Social democracy Progressivism; Green politics Anti-Putinism	GUE/NGL, S&D, Greens/EFA	Alliance of left-wing and green organizations and political parties in Central and Eastern Europe
Cooperation Committee of the Nordic Worker's Movement	SAMAK	1886	Social democracy	S&D	Alliance of social democratic parties and labour councils in the Nordic countries
Democracy in Europe Movement 2025	DiEM25	2016	Pan-Europeanism; Post-capitalism; Progressivism; Democratic socialism Environmentalism; Ecofeminism; Alter-globalization		Left-wing movement advocating alter-globalisation, social ecology, ecofeminism, post-growth and post-capitalism
Europe–Democracy–Esperanto	EDE	2003	Linguistic rights Esperantism		Organisation advocating for the use of Esperanto as an official EU language
Free Palestine Party	FPP	2024	Anti-Zionism; Muslim minority interests Anti-imperialism		Alliance of Muslim minority political parties for the 2024 European election
Liberal South East European Network	LIBSEEN	2008	Liberalism	Renew	Alliance of liberal parties and think tanks in South East Europe
Now the People	NTP	2018	Democratic socialism Eco-socialism; Left-wing populism	GUE/NGL	Alliance of left-wing political parties

=== Defunct alliances ===
- EuroNat (1997–2009): an alliance of far-right, ultranationalist political parties; involved in establishing the Identity, Tradition, Sovereignty group in the European parliament in 2007;
- The European Alliance of EU-critical Movements (TEAM, 1992–2013): an alliance of Eurosceptic or EU-critical associations, including NGOs and political parties;
- European Alliance for Freedom and Democracy (2020–2023): populist alliance; its application for registration as a European political party in 2020 was not approved.
- European Anti-Capitalist Left (EACL, 2000–2012): Alliance of left-wing and anti-capitalist political parties;
- European National Front (ENF, 2004–2009): an alliance of far-right, ultranationalist political parties;
- Five Star Direct Democracy (5SDD, 2019): an alliance of valence populist and anti-establishment parties;
- Initiative of Communist and Workers' Parties (INITIATIVE, 2013–2023): an alliance of Marxist–Leninist parties;
- Movement for European Reform: an alliance of conservative, pro-free market and Eurosceptic parties;
- Newropeans (2005–2009): a movement of citizens running on a platform of European federalism and reform.

== See also ==
- European political party
- European political foundation
- Authority for European Political Parties and European Political Foundations
- Political groups of the European Parliament
- Political alliances in the European Council
- Parliamentary Assembly of the Council of Europe
