= SAMAK =

Nordic social-democratic European political alliance

Cooperation Committee of the Nordic Workers' Movement Arbejderbevægelsens nordiske samarbejdskommitté (Danish) Arbeiderbevegelsens nordiske samarbeidskomité (Bokmål) Arbeidarrørsla si nordiske samarbeidskomité (Nynorsk) Arbetarrörelsens nordiska samarbetskommitté (Swedish) Pohjoismaiden työläisliikkeen yhteistyökomitea (Finnish)
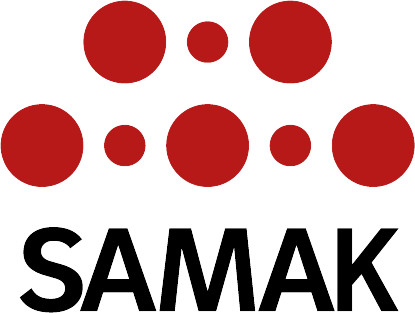
- Abbreviation: SAMAK
- President: Mette Frederiksen
- General Secretary: Antti Rinne
- Chair of the Board: Kjersti Stenseng
- Founded: 1886
- Headquarters: Youngstorget 2, 0181 Oslo
- Ideology: Social democracy
- Political position: Centre-left
- European affiliation: Party of European Socialists
- European Parliament group: Progressive Alliance of Socialists and Democrats
- Nordic Council affiliation: The Social Democratic Group
- Colours: Red
- Nordic Council: 24 / 87

Website
- samak.info

The Cooperation Committee of the Nordic Workers' Movement (Danish: Arbejderbevægelsens nordiske samarbejdskommitté, Finnish: Pohjoismaiden työläisliikkeen yhteistyökomitea, Norwegian Bokmål: Arbeiderbevegelsens nordiske samarbeidskomité, Swedish: Arbetarrörelsens nordiska samarbetskommitté), better known by its abbreviation SAMAK, is a social democratic European political alliance gathering parties and labour councils in Nordic countries.

SAMAK consists of all social democratic parties and trade union organisations in the Nordic countries, including in Greenland, the Faroe Islands and Åland. The current president of the committee as of 2024 is Mette Frederiksen, the leader of the Social Democrats and Prime Minister of Denmark. Antti Rinne is the general secretary, and Kjersti Stenseng the chair of the board.

The committee was formed during the first Scandinavian Workers' Congress in Gothenburg in 1886.

SAMAK holds a congress every four years, while the board meets four to six times per year.

== Member organisations ==
The red rose, a common symbol of social democracy. Nearly all member parties use the red rose as their logo or symbol.

Denmark

- Danish Trade Union Confederation
- Social Democrats

Faroe Islands
• Social Democratic Party

Greenland
• Forward

Finland

- Central Organisation of Finnish Trade Unions
- Social Democratic Party of Finland

Åland
• Åland Social Democrats

Iceland

- Icelandic Confederation of Labour
- Social Democratic Alliance

Norway

- Norwegian Confederation of Trade Unions
- Labour Party

Sweden

- Swedish Trade Union Confederation
- Swedish Social Democratic Workers' Party

== See also ==
- The Social Democratic Group
