= Sivert Bjørnstad =

Norwegian politician (born 1990)

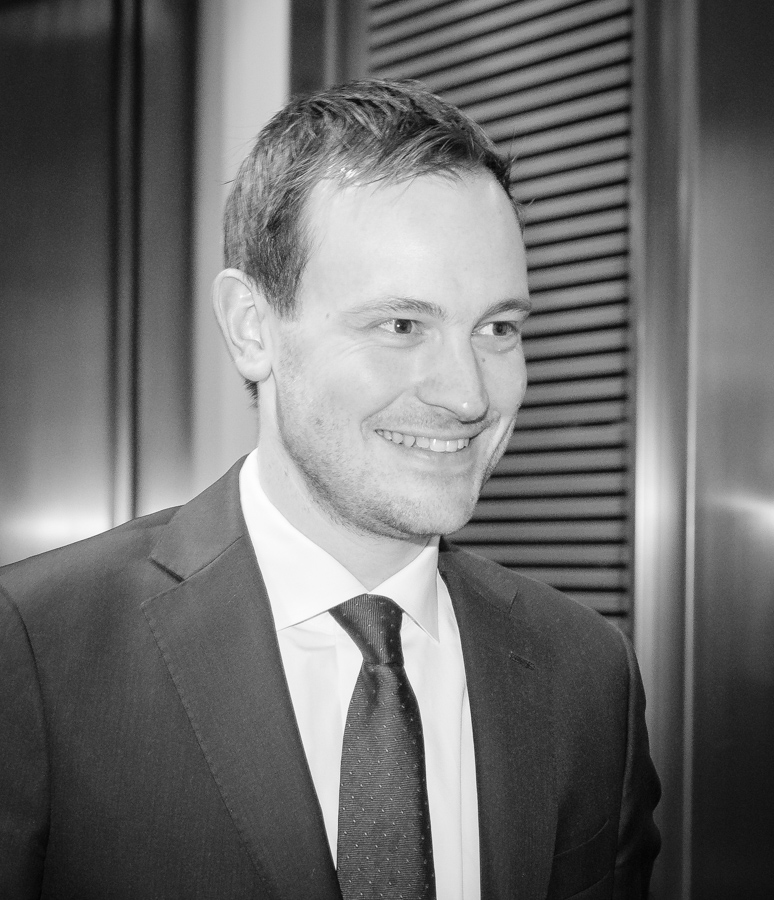
- Bjørnstad in 2018

Member of the Storting
- In office 1 October 2013 – 30 September 2025
- Constituency: Sør-Trøndelag

Personal details
- Born: 3 October 1990 (age 36) Trondheim, Sør-Trøndelag, Norway
- Party: Progress
- Spouse: Mari Holm Lønseth (m. 2024)
- Education: BI Norwegian Business School

Sivert Haugen Bjørnstad (born 3 October 1990) is a Norwegian politician for the Progress Party. He served as a member of the Storting for Sør-Trøndelag from 2013 to 2025, becoming the parliament's youngest member at the time of his first election.

== Education ==
He studies economy at BI Norwegian Business School in Trondheim.

== Political career ==
=== Local politics ===
Bjørstad was elected to the Trondheim city council and the Sør-Trøndelag county council in 2011. He was re-elected in 2015 and sat until 2019. He was elected 2nd deputy leader of the Progress Party's Youth in 2012.

=== Parliament ===
Bjørnstad was elected to the Storting, the Norwegian parliament, in the 2013 election. He was re-elected since in 2017 and 2021. In the Storting, he sat on the Standing Committee on Education and Research between 2013 and 2016. From 2016 to 2017, he sat on the Standing Committee on Business and Industry. He joined the Standing Committee on Finance and Economic Affairs in 2017 and was a part of it until February 2021. Between 2019 and 2020, he also served as its second vice chair. He rejoined the Standing Committee on Business and Industry in February 2021.

In June 2024, he announced that he wouldn't be seeking re-election at the 2025 parliamentary election.

== Personal life ==
Bjørnstad married Conservative Party member of parliament Mari Holm Lønseth in March 2024.

Political offices
Preceded by Helge André Njåstad	Second Vice Chair of the Standing Committee on Finance and Economic Affairs; 2019–2020	Succeeded by Sylvi Listhaug
