= Per-Willy Amundsen =

Norwegian politician (born 1971)

Minister of Justice
- In office 20 December 2016 – 17 January 2018
- Prime Minister: Erna Solberg
- Preceded by: Anders Anundsen
- Succeeded by: Sylvi Listhaug

Member of the Norwegian Parliament
- Incumbent
- Assumed office 1 October 2017
- Deputy: Kristian P. Wilsgård (2017–2018)
- Constituency: Troms
- In office 1 October 2005 – 30 September 2013
- Constituency: Troms

State Secretary to the Minister of Local Government and Modernisation
- In office 16 October 2013 – 20 December 2016
- Prime Minister: Erna Solberg
- Minister: Jan Tore Sanner

Personal details
- Born: Per-Willy Trudvang Amundsen; 21 January 1971 (age 55) Harstad, Troms, Norway
- Party: Progress
- Spouse: Gry-Anette Rekanes Amundsen (m. 2009)
- Education: Norwegian School of Economics; Sør-Trøndelag University College; Home Guard

Per-Willy Trudvang Amundsen (born 21 January 1971) is a Norwegian politician for the Progress Party who served as Minister of Justice from December 2016 to January 2018. He previously served as state secretary in the Ministry of Local Government and Regional Development from 2013, and represented Troms in the Norwegian parliament from 2005 until 2013. He was re-elected in 2017.

== Early life and education ==
Amundsen was born in Harstad to construction and real estate chief Per Roald Amundsen (born 1949) and health secretary Wenche Berit Trudvang (born 1949).

He attended Kanebogen elementary school, finishing in 1984, before enrolling in Harstad Secondary school, graduating in 1987. He later went to Heggen Upper Secondary School between 1987 and 1990. Upon finishing school, he was drafted to the Norwegian Army, serving his tour in the Signal Battalion in Bardufoss. Upon being discharged, he enrolled at Norwegian School of Economics, graduating in 1995 with a degree in economics. In 1999, he received a degree in information technology at the Sør-Trøndelag University College. He also completed the Military leadership course with the Home Guard.

== Political career ==
=== Early career ===
Amundsen joined the Progress Party's Youth when he was fourteen years old, and was the chairman of its Harstad chapter from 1986 to 1990 – the last year also of its Troms chapter. From 1992 to 1994 he served as board member of the Hordaland Progress Party Youth, and from 2000 to 2002 he was chairman of the Harstad Progress Party.

=== Local politics and parliament ===
From 1999 to 2005, Amundsen held various positions in the Harstad municipality council. Since 2005, he has been a Member of Parliament from Troms. During his time in parliament, he has been a member of the Standing Committee on Local Government and Public Administration. In 2011, Amundsen changed from being the party's Spokesperson on Immigration Issues, to Spokesperson on Energy Issues. After the 2013 parliamentary election, Amundsen, located 2nd on the party list, lost his seat due to re-districting of Troms county. He became a deputy member instead, from 2013 to 2017. He was subsequently appointed state secretary in the Ministry of Local Government and Modernisation in the new government of Erna Solberg. He was re-elected following the 2017 election.

Following the 2021 election, Amundsen became the chair of the Standing Committee on Justice. He resigned as chair in March 2024 following controversial comments made on Facebook regarding the Israel-Palestine conflict and women's rights. Helge André Njåstad succeeded him on 14 March, while Amundsen was moved to the Standing Committee on Local Government and Public Administration.

=== Minister of Justice ===
On 20 December 2016, in a cabinet reshuffle, Amundsen was appointed Minister of Justice, succeeding fellow Progress Party politician Anders Anundsen. His appointment received massive criticism for his prior controversial remarks, which he refused to address when he took over as minister.

He was dismissed from government when the Liberal Party joined the Solberg cabinet on 17 January 2018. He was succeeded by fellow party member Sylvi Listhaug.

== Political views ==
Before the 2005 election, he stated as his wishes to work in the background within the Standing Committee on Business and Industry or the Standing Committee on Energy and the Environment. By the latter part of his 2005–2009 term as Member of Parliament, he became well known for his views and proposals on immigration issues. While he formerly favoured Norwegian membership of the European Union, since the late 2000s he has opposed membership. He has stated that his political rolemodel is Margaret Thatcher. He was one of the Norwegian politicians together with Christian Tybring-Gjedde to propose Donald Trump as a candidate for Nobel Peace Prize.

=== Immigration and Islam ===
Amundsen has said that his concern with immigration is largely due to the problem of unintegrated immigrants. He says that many adhere to cultural values which "collide fundamentally" with Norwegian and Western values such as democracy, freedom, freedom of speech, equality and tolerance. He does not accept that all cultures are equally good or valuable. He views radical Islam as "fascism based on religion", which he puts in his context of communism as "fascism based on understanding of class" and nazism as "fascism based on race". He has said that he believes radical Islam should be fought against like all types of fascism.

His political proposals include to establish asylum centres in areas close to where the asylum seekers originate from, and in general to drastically reduce immigration to Norway. He has also sought to remove the public economical support for the Islamic Council Norway as it did not distance itself from the use of death penalty for homosexuality. He wants stricter control on Mosques, not accept halal slaughtering, remove halal food from prison facilities, and reject hijab in the police force. He also oppose special demands such as separate schools for Muslims, classrooms segregated by gender, limitation of freedom of speech regarding religion, special breaks for praying during work-time and alcohol-free days in nightclubs. He claims that the political left, socialists and politically correct people are giving in to many such demands.

He supported the proposal of a ban on burqa and niqab in public spaces which was proposed by his party in 2010. He stated that "we don't accept this type of clothing [which is] oppressive to women, and what they represent". The same year, Amundsen also proposed to put the immigration policy up for a referendum, and proposed a halt of immigration to Oslo in the wake of increased segregation and soon-to-become immigrant majority areas, which he said would turn integration impossible.

==== Racism controversy ====
In early 2019 Amundsen sparked a huge debate in Norway when he suggested for child support for non-western immigrants to be cut to stop them from "producing more children" and halt a possible decline of "ethnic Norwegians" in the population. Some commentators denounced Amundsen intentions and tone of speech as racist and out of line with the principles of Norwegian politics and community. Jon Helgheim, the spokesperson for immigration in Amundsen own party, declared that Amundsen's statement did not represent the Progress Party's immigration policies.

=== Energy and climate ===
Amundsen supports oil exploration off the Lofoten archipelago, a major breeding ground for Atlantic cod. He also supports the involvement of Statoil, the Norwegian oil and gas company where the state of Norway is the majority shareholder, in exploitation of oil sands.

Amundsen defines himself as climate sceptic. He has argued that climate problems are used to conduct socialist policies, saying that "for many socialists, CO_{2} has replaced Karl Marx".

=== Tommy Robinson ===
Amundsen wants Norway to give asylum to UK right wing activist Tommy Robinson, who was given a nine-month jail sentence in 2019. Amundsen said Robinson was being politically persecuted in the UK.

=== Facebook comments controversy ===
In March 2024, Amundsen caused controversy when he responded to Facebook comments accusing Israel supporters of genocide. He made comments about "Standing with Israel against Arabs who kill people", comments he later deleted. Despite the removal he expressed that he didn't regret his response. Other members of Parliament, from both his own party and others, criticsed him for the comments, with some calling them racist. The Green Party's Une Bastholm called for Storting President Masud Gharahkhani to consider removing Amundsen as chair of the Standing Committee on Justice. Later that day, Dagbladet revealed that he had also made controversial remarks about the International Women's Day, notably talking down women's rights and that "schools and kindergartens have hit with unfathomable gender theories". Amundsen later explained that both posts were made while he was under the influence. The day after, party leader Sylvi Listhaug announced that the party would be conducting an internal investigation into Amundsen. The controversy led to him announcing his resignation as chair on 10 March. Furthermore, the police announced two days later that it would be investigating Amundsen's comments on the grounds of discrimination and hate speech.

== Personal life ==
He was married on 11 July 2009 to Gry-Anette Rekanes-Amundsen, herself a local Telemark Progress Party politician. They divide their time between Oslo and their rural estate in Flåbygd in Telemark. In addition, they own a house together in Harstad.

Political offices
Preceded by Anders Anundsen	Minister of Justice and Public Security; 2016–2018	Succeeded by Sylvi Listhaug
Preceded by Lene Vågslid	Chair of the Standing Committee on Justice; 2021–2024	Succeeded by Helge André Njåstad
