= Nordic Council =

Body for cooperation of Nordic countries

(in official languages)
Danish	Nordisk Råd
Finnish	Pohjoismaiden neuvosto
Faroese	Norðurlandaráðið
Icelandic	Norðurlandaráð
Greenlandic	Nunat Avannarliit Siunnersuisoqatigiit
Norwegian	Nordisk råd
Northern Sami	Davviriikkaid ráđđi
Pite Sami	Nuarrtarijkaj rárre
Southern Sami	Noerhtelaanti raerie
Lule Sami	Nuorttarijkaj ráde
Inari Sami	Tave-enâmij rääđi
Skolt Sami	Tâʹvvjânnmi suåvtõs
Swedish	Nordiska rådet
- Flag

- Member states shown in dark blue; and regions of member states shown in light blue.

- Secretariat Headquarters: (Denmark) Copenhagen
- Official languages: Danish; Finnish; Icelandic; Norwegian; Swedish
- Type: Inter-parliamentary institution
- Membership: 5 sovereign states: Denmark; Finland; Iceland; Norway; Sweden; 2 autonomous territories: Faroe Islands; Greenland; 1 autonomous region: Åland

Leaders
  - Secretary-General: (Faroe Islands) Kristina Háfoss (2021–)
  - President: (Sweden) Heléne Björklund (2025)
  - Vice-President: (Sweden) Maria Stockhaus (2025)

Establishment
  - Inauguration of the Nordic Council: 12 February 1953
  - Helsinki Treaty: 1 July 1962
  - Inauguration of the Nordic Council of Ministers: July 1971

Area
  - Total: 3,550,000 km^{2} (1,370,000 sq mi)

Population
  - 2025 estimate: 28.3 million
  - Density: 4.4/km^{2} (11.4/sq mi)
- GDP (PPP): 2026 estimate
  - Total: US$2.45 trillion
  - Per capita: US$86,200
- GDP (nominal): 2026 estimate
  - Total: US$2.25 trillion
  - Per capita: US$79,200
- Currency: (Denmark) (Faroe Islands) (Greenland) Danish krone; (Finland) (Åland) Euro; (Sweden) Swedish krona; (Iceland) Icelandic króna; (Norway) Norwegian krone
- Website www.norden.org/en

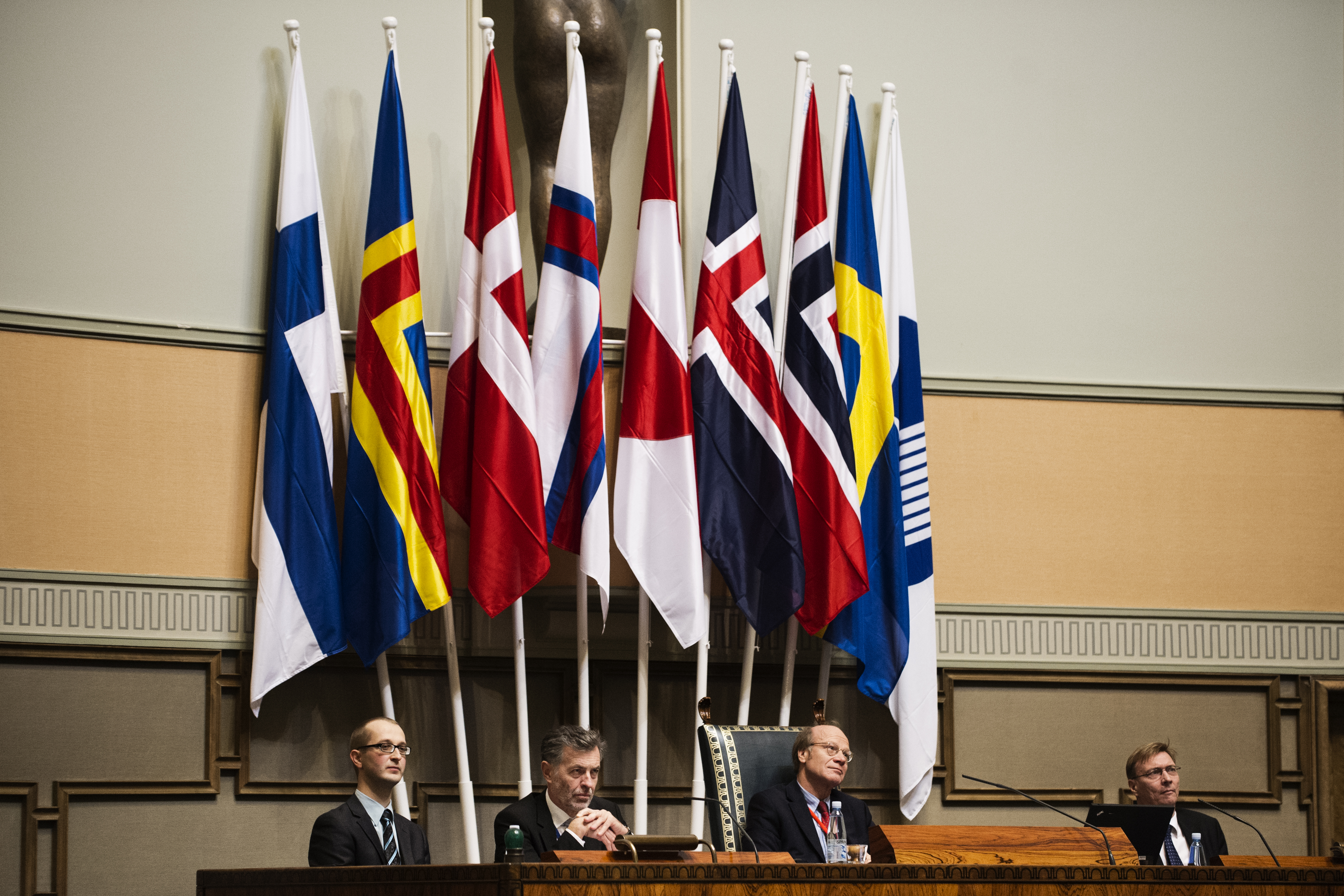
Nordic Council session in Helsinki, Finland (October 2012)

Flag before 2016

The Nordic Council is the official body for formal inter-parliamentary Nordic cooperation among the Nordic countries. Formed in 1952, it has 87 representatives from Denmark, Finland, Iceland, Norway, and Sweden, as well as from the autonomous areas of the Faroe Islands, Greenland, and Åland. The representatives are members of parliament in their respective countries or areas and are elected by those parliaments. The Council holds ordinary sessions each year in October/November and usually one extra session per year with a specific theme. The council's official languages are Danish, Finnish, Icelandic, Norwegian, and Swedish, though it uses only the mutually intelligible Scandinavian languages—Danish, Norwegian, and Swedish—as its working languages. These three comprise the first language of around 80% of the region's population and are learned as a second or foreign language by the remaining 20%.

In 1971, the Nordic Council of Ministers, an intergovernmental forum, was established to complement the council. The Council and the Council of Ministers are involved in various forms of cooperation with neighbouring areas in Northern Europe, including the German state of Schleswig-Holstein, the Benelux countries and the Baltic states.

== History ==
During World War II, Denmark and Norway were occupied by Germany; Finland was under assault by the Soviet Union; while Sweden, though neutral, still felt the war's effects. Following the war, the Nordic countries pursued the idea of a Scandinavian defence union to ensure their mutual defence. However, Finland, due to its Paasikivi–Kekkonen policy of neutrality and FCMA treaty with the USSR, could not participate.

It was proposed that the Nordic countries would unify their foreign policy and defence, remain neutral in the event of a conflict and not ally with NATO, which some were planning at the time. The United States, keen on getting access to bases in Scandinavia and believing the Nordic countries incapable of defending themselves, stated it would not ensure military support for Scandinavia if they did not join NATO. As Denmark and Norway sought US aid for their post-war reconstruction, the project collapsed, with Denmark, Norway and Iceland joining NATO as founding members. Finland and Sweden joined NATO in 2023 and 2024, respectively, following the 2022 Russian invasion of Ukraine.

Further Nordic co-operation, such as an economic customs union, also failed. This led Danish Prime Minister Hans Hedtoft to propose, on 13 August 1951, a consultative interparliamentary body. This proposal was agreed by Denmark, Iceland, Norway, and Sweden during a meeting in Copenhagen on 15–16 March 1952. The council's first session was held in the Danish Parliament on 13 February 1953 and it elected Hans Hedtoft as its president. When Finnish-Soviet relations thawed following the death of Joseph Stalin, Finland joined the council in 1955, following a voting in the Parliament of Finland on 28 October that year, effective from 23 December the same year.

On 2 July 1954, the Nordic labour market was created and in 1958, building upon a 1952 passport-free travel area, the Nordic Passport Union was created. These two measures helped ensure Nordic citizens' free movement around the area. A Nordic Convention on Social Security was implemented in 1955. There were also plans for a single market but they were abandoned in 1959 shortly before Denmark, Norway, and Sweden joined the European Free Trade Area (EFTA). Finland became an associated member of EFTA in 1961 and Denmark and Norway applied to join the European Economic Community (EEC).

This move towards the EEC led to desire for a formal Nordic treaty. The Helsinki Treaty outlined the workings of the council and came into force on 24 March 1962. Further advancements on Nordic cooperation were made in the following years: a Nordic School of Public Health, a Nordic Cultural Fund, and Nordic House in Reykjavík were created. Danish Prime Minister Hilmar Baunsgaard proposed full economic cooperation ("Nordek") in 1968. Nordek was agreed in 1970, but Finland then backtracked, stating that its ties with the Soviet Union meant it could not form close economic ties with potential members of the EEC (Denmark and Norway). Nordek was then abandoned.

As a consequence, Denmark and Norway applied to join the EEC and the Nordic Council of Ministers was set up in 1971 to ensure continued Nordic cooperation. In 1970 representatives of the Faroe Islands and Åland were allowed to take part in the Nordic Council as part of the Danish and Finnish delegations. Norway turned down EEC membership in 1972 while Denmark acted as a bridge builder between the EEC and the Nordics. Also in 1973, although it did not opt for full membership of the EEC, Finland negotiated a free trade treaty with the EEC that in practice removed customs duties from 1977 on, although there were transition periods up to 1985 for some products. Sweden did not apply due to its non-alliance policy, which was aimed at preserving neutrality. Greenland subsequently left the EEC and has since sought a more active role in circumpolar affairs.

In the 1970s, the Nordic Council founded the Nordic Industrial Fund, Nordtest and the Nordic Investment Bank. The council's remit was also expanded to include environmental protection and, in order to clean up the pollution in the Baltic Sea and the North Atlantic, a joint energy network was established. The Nordic Science Policy Council was set up in 1983 and, in 1984, representatives from Greenland were allowed to join the Danish delegation.

Following the collapse of the Soviet Union in 1991, the Nordic Council began to cooperate more with the Baltic states and new Baltic Sea organisations. Sweden and Finland joined the European Union (EU), the EEC's successor, in 1995. Norway had also applied, but once again voted against membership. However, Norway and Iceland did join the European Economic Area (EEA) which integrated them economically with the EU. The Nordic Passport Union was also subsumed into the EU's Schengen Area in 1996.

The Nordic Council became more outward-looking, to the Arctic, Baltic, Europe, and Canada. The Øresund Bridge linking Sweden and Denmark led to a large amount of cross-border travel, which in turn led to further efforts to reduce barriers. However, the initially envisioned tasks and functions of the Nordic Council have become partially dormant due to the significant overlap with the EU and EEA. In 2008 Iceland began EU membership talks, but decided to annul these in 2015. Unlike the Benelux, there is no explicit provision in the Treaty on European Union that takes into account Nordic co-operation. However, the Treaties provide that international agreements concluded by the Member States before they become members of the Union remain valid, even if they are contrary to the provisions of Union law. However, each Member State must take all necessary measures to eliminate any discrepancies as quickly as possible. Nordic co-operation can therefore in practice only be designed to the extent that it complies with Union law.

== Organisation ==
=== Council ===
The Nordic Council consists of 87 representatives, elected from its members' parliaments and reflecting the relative representation of the political parties in those parliaments. It holds its main session in the autumn, while a so-called "theme session" is arranged in the spring. Each of the national delegations has its own secretariat in the national parliament. The autonomous territories – Greenland, the Faroe Islands, and Åland – also have Nordic secretariats.

The Council does not have any formal power on its own, but each government has to implement any decisions through its national legislature. With all countries being members of NATO, the Nordic Council has not been involved in any military cooperation.

=== Council of Ministers ===
The original Nordic Council concentrates on inter-parliamentary cooperation. The Nordic Council of Ministers, founded in 1971, is responsible for intergovernmental cooperation. Prime Ministers have ultimate responsibility but this is usually delegated to the Minister for Nordic Cooperation and the Nordic Committee for Co-operation, which coordinates the day-to-day work. The autonomous territories have the same representation as states. The Nordic Council of Ministers has offices in the Baltic countries.

=== Secretary General ===
- Secretary-General of the Nordic Council

=== Languages ===
The Nordic Council uses the three Continental Scandinavian languages (Danish, Norwegian, and Swedish) as its official working languages, while interpretation and translation service is arranged for Finnish and Icelandic (but never between the Scandinavian languages). The council also publishes material in English for information purposes. The Council refers to Danish, Norwegian, and Swedish collectively as Scandinavian and considers them to be different forms of the same language forming a common language community. Since 1987, under the Nordic Language Convention, citizens of the Nordic countries have the opportunity to use their native language when interacting with official bodies in other Nordic countries without being liable to any interpretation or translation costs. The Convention covers visits to hospitals, job centres, the police, and social security offices. The languages included are Danish, Finnish, Icelandic, Norwegian, and Swedish.

On 31 October 2018, the council established it has five official languages, giving Finnish and Icelandic equal status with Danish, Norwegian, and Swedish from 1 January 2020 onward. While the working languages of the council's secretariat remain the three Scandinavian languages, the Council emphasised that the secretariat must include personnel with comprehensive understanding of Finnish and Icelandic as well. The then-President of the Council Michael Tetzschner thought the compromise good but also expressed concern over the change's expenses and hoped they would not increase so much that there would be pressure to switch over to using English.

== Work ==
=== Language understanding ===
The Nordic Council and the Nordic Council of Ministers have a particular focus on strengthening the Nordic language community; the main focus of their work to promote language understanding in the Nordic countries is on children and young people's understanding of written and oral Danish, Norwegian, and Swedish, the three mutually intelligible Scandinavian languages.

== Location ==
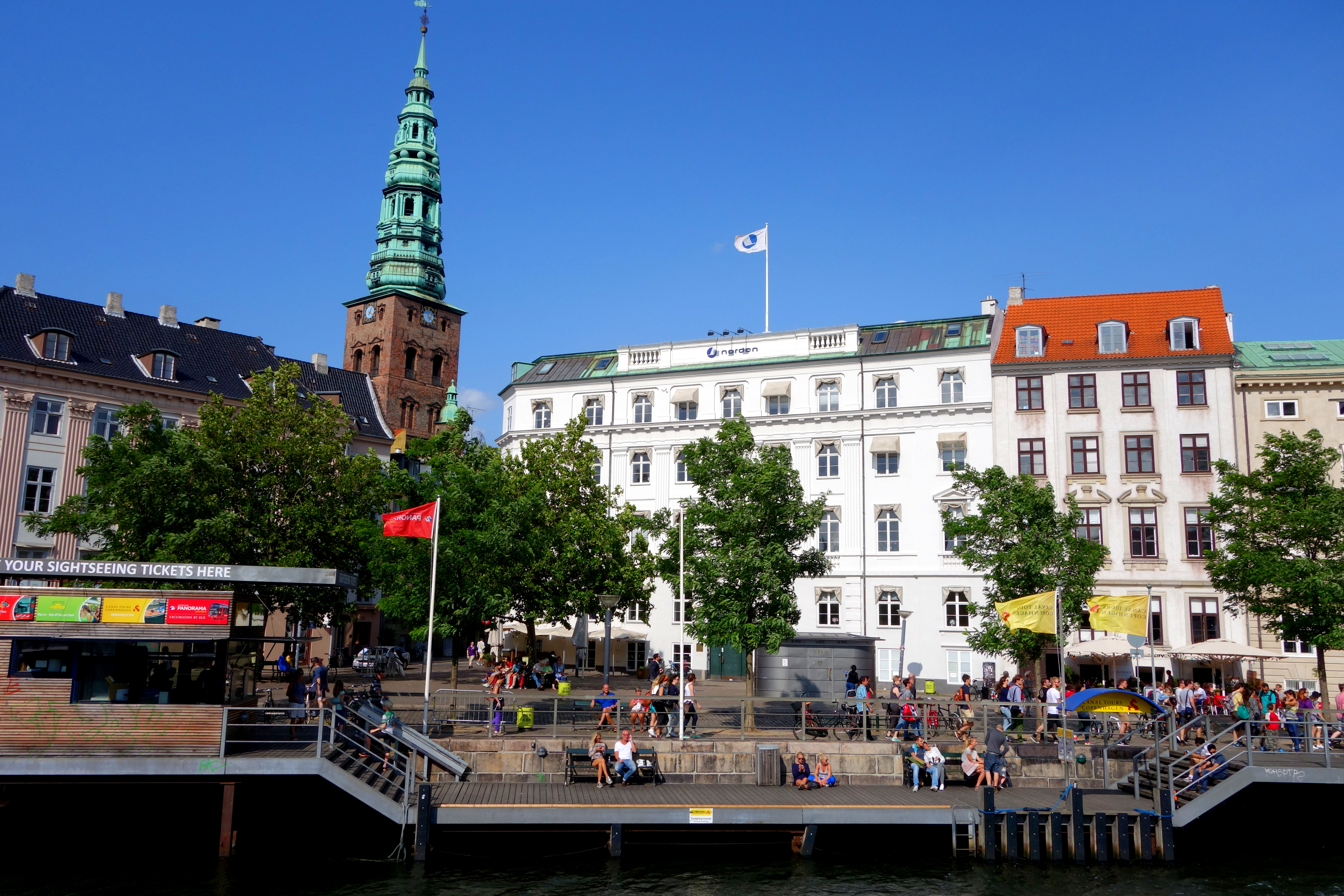
Nordic Council headquarters in Copenhagen. White building with Norden sign and flag at street Ved Stranden No. 18.

The Nordic Council and the Council of Ministers have their headquarters in Copenhagen and various installations in each separate country, as well as many offices in neighbouring countries. The headquarters are located at Ved Stranden No. 18, close to Slotsholmen.

== Members ==
=== List of members ===
The Nordic Council has five full members (which are sovereign states) and three associate members (which are self-governing regions of full member states).

Member name	Symbols		Parliament	Membership	Membership status	Members	Represented since	EFTA/EU/EEA relation
Member name	Arms	Flag	Parliament	Membership	Membership status	Members	Represented since	EFTA/EU/EEA relation
Finland	Finland	(Finland)	Eduskunta (Riksdagen)	full	sovereign state	20 (each)	1955	(Europe) EU member EEA member
Sweden	Sweden	(Sweden)	Riksdag	full	sovereign state	20 (each)	1952	(Europe) EU member EEA member
Denmark	Denmark	(Denmark)	Folketing	full	sovereign state	20 (each)	1952	(Europe) EU member EEA member
Norway	Norway	(Norway)	Storting	full	sovereign state	20 (each)	1952	EFTA founding member EEA member
Iceland	Iceland	(Iceland)	Alþingi	full	sovereign state	7	1952	EFTA founding member EEA member
Greenland	Greenland	(Greenland)	Inatsisartut	associate	self-governing regions of Denmark	2 (each) out of Denmark's 20	1984	OCT
Faroe Islands	Faroe Islands	(Faroe Islands)	Løgting	associate	self-governing regions of Denmark	2 (each) out of Denmark's 20	1970	minimal
Åland	Åland	(Åland)	Lagting	associate	self-governing region of Finland	2 out of Finland's 20	1970	(Europe) EU territory

=== List of representatives ===
As of December 2021

Delegation	Group	Name	Committee(s)
Åland	Centre	Anders Eriksson	Growth and Development
Denmark	Social Democrat	Anders Kronborg	Control, Sustainability
Sweden	Freedom	Angelika Bengtsson	Election
Iceland	Centre	Anna Kolbrún Árnadóttir	Knowledge and Culture
Finland	Conservative	Anna-Kaisa Ikonen	Sustainability
Sweden	Centre	Arman Teimouri	Growth and Development
Sweden	Freedom	Aron Emilsson	Presidium
Norway	Conservative	Bente Stein Mathisen	None
Denmark	Centre	Bertel Haarder	None
Åland	Social Democrat	Camilla Gunell	Knowledge and Culture
Sweden	Conservative	Cecilie Tenfjord Toftby	Sustainability
Denmark	Green Left	Christian Juhl	Presidium, Election
Sweden	Green Left	Daniel Riazat	Knowledge and Culture
Faroe Islands	Centre	Edmund Joensen	Knowledge and Culture
Sweden	Social Democrat	Emilia Töyrä	Sustainability
Finland	Social Democrat	Erkki Tuomioja	Presidium
Norway	Unaffiliated	Erlend Wiborg	Knowledge and Culture
Denmark	Centre	Erling Bonnesen	Welfare
Sweden	Social Democrat	Eva Lindh	Welfare
Finland	Social Democrat	Eveliina Heinäluoma	Growth and Development
Norway	Green Left	Freddy André Øvstegård	Growth and Development
Sweden	Social Democrat	Gunilla Carlsson	Presidium
Sweden	Conservative	Hans Wallmark	Presidium
Norway	Centre	Heidi Greni	Presidium, Election
Finland	Social Democrat	Heidi Viljanen	Knowledge and Culture
Norway	Unaffiliated	Helge André Njåstad	Growth and Development
Finland	Centre	Heli Järvinen	Welfare
Denmark	Social Democrat	Henrik Møller	Knowledge and Culture
Faroe Islands	Green Left	Høgni Hoydal	Welfare
Finland	Social Democrat	Ilmari Nurminen	Welfare
Iceland	Centre	Inga Sæland	Welfare
Norway	Social Democrat	Ingalill Olsen	Sustainability
Faroe Islands	Centre	Jaspur Langgaard	Growth and Development
Finland	Centre	Joakim Strand	Growth and Development
Norway	Social Democrat	Jorodd Asphjell	Knowledge and Culture
Finland	Centre	Jouni Ovaska	Knowledge and Culture
Finland	Conservative	Juhana Vartiainen	Growth and Development
Finland	Freedom	Kaisa Juuso	Control, Welfare
Denmark	Social Democrat	Karin Gaardsted	Welfare
Denmark	Social Democrat	Kasper Roug	Sustainability
Norway	Centre	Ketil Kjenseth	None
Greenland	Social Democrat	Kim Kielsen	None
Sweden	Centre	Kjell-Arne Ottosson	None
Iceland	Green Left	Kolbeinn Óttarsson Proppé	Control
Sweden	Social Democrat	Lars Mejern Larsson	Knowledge and Culture
Sweden	Centre	Linda Modig	Presidium
Denmark	Freedom	Liselott Blixt	Welfare
Sweden	Green Left	Lorena Delgado Varas	Growth and Development
Finland	Freedom	Lulu Ranne	Growth and Development
Sweden	Centre	Magnus Ek	Sustainability
Sweden	Conservative	Maria Stockhaus	Welfare
Norway	Conservative	Marianne Synnes Emblemsvåg	Knowledge and Culture
Norway	Social Democrat	Martin Kolberg	Presidium
Denmark	Freedom	Mette Hjermind Dencker	Growth and Development
Norway	Conservative	Michael Tetzschner	Presidium
Finland	Centre	Mikko Kärnä	Sustainability
Finland	Centre	Mikko Kinnunen	Knowledge and Culture
Norway	Conservative	Nils Aage Jegstad	Growth and Development
Norway	Social Democrat	Nina Sandberg	None
Norway	Conservative	Norunn Tveiten Benestad	Knowledge and Culture, Election
Iceland	Social Democrat	Oddný G. Harðardóttir	Presidium
Norway	Centre	Ole André Myhrvold	Control, Sustainability
Denmark	Social Democrat	Orla Hav	Growth and Development
Finland	Centre	Outi Alanko-Kahiluoto	Welfare
Sweden	Conservative	Pål Jonson	Growth and Development
Sweden	Social Democrat	Per-Arne Håkansson	Control, Welfare
Denmark	Unaffiliated	Peter Seier Christensen	Sustainability
Sweden	Social Democrat	Pyry Niemi	Election
Denmark	Conservative	Rasmus Jarlov	Knowledge and Culture, Welfare
Denmark	Green Left	Rasmus Nordqvist	None
Sweden	Centre	Rebecka Le Moine	Sustainability
Finland	Freedom	Riikka Purra	Knowledge and Culture
Norway	Social Democrat	Ruth Mari Grung	Growth and Development
Iceland	Centre	Silja Dögg Gunnarsdóttir	Presidium
Greenland	Green Left	Sofia Geisler	Sustainability
Norway	Unaffiliated	Solveig Horne	Welfare
Norway	Conservative	Solveig Sundbø Abrahamsen	Welfare
Sweden	Freedom	Staffan Eklöf	Sustainability
Norway	Social Democrat	Stein Erik Lauvås	Growth and Development
Iceland	Green Left	Steinunn Þóra Árnadóttir	Presidium
Denmark	Centre	Stinus Lindgreen	Welfare
Norway	Centre	Torhild Bransdal	Growth and Development
Finland	Green Left	Veronika Honkasalo	Knowledge and Culture
Finland	Freedom	Vilhelm Junnila	Sustainability
Iceland	Conservative	Vilhjálmur Árnason	Sustainability
Finland	Conservative	Wille Rydman	Presidium

=== Party groups ===
The Nordic Council comprises the following party groups:

Name	Abbr.	Founded	Ideology	Political Group	Nordic Council
Centre Group	MG	1983	Liberalism; Christian democracy Green politics Agrarianism (Nordic)	Renew, Greens/EFA, EPP Group	21 / 87
Conservative Group	KG	2015	Conservatism; Liberal conservatism Economic liberalism	EPP Group	15 / 87
Nordic Freedom	NF	2012	Right-wing populism National conservatism Euroscepticism	ECR, PfE	10 / 87
Nordic Green Left Alliance	NGLA	2004	Democratic socialism Eco-socialism; Popular socialism Socialism; Environmentalism; Feminism; Progressivism	The Left, Greens/EFA	9 / 87
The Social Democratic Group	S-Norden	2011	Social democracy	S&D	22 / 87
Blue Nordic		2026	National conservatism	ECR	7 / 87

== Observer, guests and other cooperation with neighbouring countries and regions ==
In accordance with § 13 of the Rules of Procedure for the Nordic Council the Sámi Parliamentary Council is the only institution with observer status with the Nordic Council. In accordance with § 14, the Nordic Youth Council has the status of "guest" on a permanent basis, and the Presidium "may invite representatives of popularly elected bodies and other persons to a session and grant them speaking rights" as guests. According to the council, "within the last couple of years, guests from other international and Nordic organisations have been able to take part in the debates at the Sessions. Visitors from the Baltic States and Northwest Russia are those who mostly take up this opportunity. Guests who have a connection to the theme under discussion are invited to the Theme Session."

The Nordic Council of Ministers has established four Offices outside the Nordic Region: In Estonia, Latvia, Lithuania and the German state of Schleswig-Holstein. The offices form part of the secretariat of the Nordic Council of Ministers; according to the Council of Ministers their primary mission is to promote cooperation between the Nordic countries and the Baltic states and to promote the Nordic countries in cooperation with their embassies within the Baltic states.

The Nordic Council and the Council of Ministers also define Estonia, Latvia, Lithuania, and Russia as "Adjacent Areas" and has formal cooperation with them under the Adjacent Areas policies framework.

The Nordic Council had historically been a strong supporter of Baltic independence from the Soviet Union. During the move towards independence in the Baltic States in 1991, Denmark and Iceland pressed for the Observer Status in the Nordic Council for the then-nonsovereign Estonia, Latvia, and Lithuania. The move in 1991 was opposed by Norway and Finland. The move was heavily opposed by the Soviet Union, accusing the Nordic Council of getting involved in its internal affairs. In the same year, the Nordic Council refused to give observer status for the three, at the time nonsovereign, Baltic states.

While the Nordic Council rejected the Baltic states' application for formal observer status, the council nevertheless has extensive cooperation on different levels with all neighbouring countries, including the Baltic states and Germany, especially the state of Schleswig-Holstein. Representatives of Schleswig-Holstein were present as informal guests during a session for the first time in 2016. The state has historical ties to Denmark and cross-border cooperation with Denmark and has a Danish minority population. As parliamentary representatives from Schleswig-Holstein, a member of the South Schleswig Voter Federation and a member of the Social Democrats with ties to the Danish minority were elected.

The Sámi political structures long desired formal representation in the Nordic Council's structures, and were eventually granted observer status through the Sámi Parliamentary Council. In addition, representatives of the Sámi people are de facto included in activities touching upon their interests. In addition, the Faroe Islands have expressed their wishes for full membership in the Nordic Council instead of the current associate membership.

Three of the members of the Nordic Council (Sweden, Denmark, and Finland, all EU member states), the Baltic Assembly, and the Benelux sought intensifying cooperation in the Digital Single Market, as well as discussing social matters, the Economic and Monetary Union of the European Union, the European migrant crisis and defense cooperation. Foreign relations in the wake of Russia's annexation of Crimea and the 2017 Turkish constitutional referendum were also on the agenda.

Following the 2021 Scottish Parliament election, the Finnish member of Parliament Mikko Kärnä announced he would launch an initiative at the Nordic council to grant Scotland observer status. Scotland's relationship with the Nordics has also been explored by Scottish journalist and Arctic security researcher Anthony Heron, who would go on to interview Bertel Haarder, and later Ville Väyrynen on the topic.

== Nordic unification ==
Some desire the Nordic Council's promotion of Nordic cooperation to go much further than at present. If the states of Iceland, Sweden, Norway, Denmark, and Finland were to merge in such an integration as some desire, it would command a gross domestic product of US$2.3 trillion, making it the twelfth largest economy in the world, larger than that of Australia, Spain, Mexico, or South Korea. Gunnar Wetterberg, a Swedish historian and economist, wrote a book entered into the Nordic Council's year book that proposes the creation of a Nordic Federation from the Council in a few decades.

== See also ==
- Baltoscandia
- Frugal Four
- Kalmar Union
- West Nordic Council
- Nordic identity in Estonia
