= Kierulf =

Kierulf is a surname. Notable people with the surname include:

- Anders Kierulf, author of Smart Game Format
- Anine Kierulf (born 1974), Norwegian lawyer
- Brian Kierulf, American songwriter and producer
- Henrik Gottfries Kierulf (born 1981), Norwegian politician
- Otto Richard Kierulf (1825–1897), Norwegian military officer, politician, and sports administrator
- Severin Kierulf (1752–1834), Danish businessman in Danish India
