= Guro Angell Gimse =

Norwegian politician

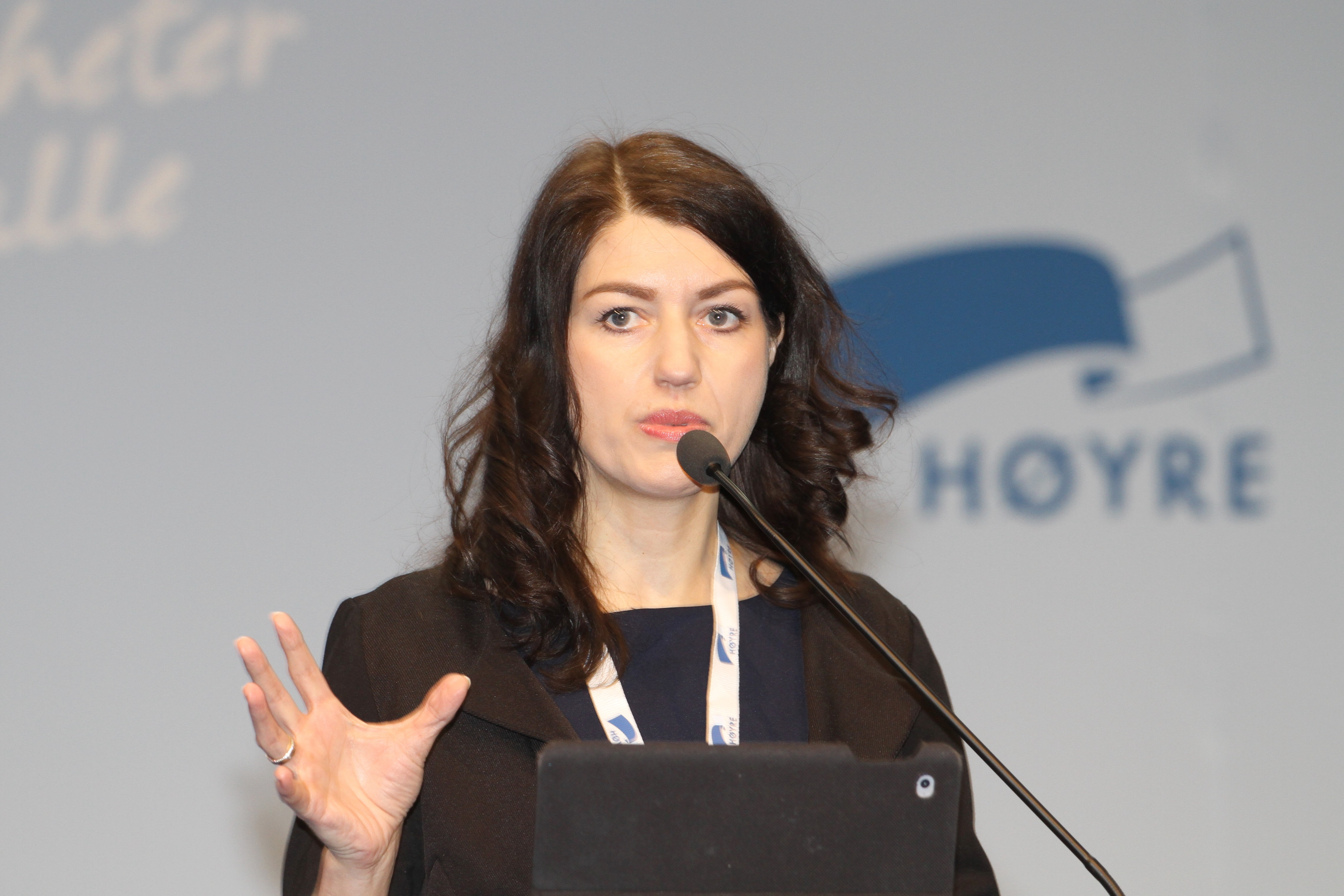

Deputy Member of the Storting
- In office 1 October 2017 – 30 September 2025
- Deputising for: Linda Hofstad Helleland (2017–2019, 2020–2021); Mari Holm Lønseth (2025)
- Constituency: Sør-Trøndelag

Personal details
- Born: 20 July 1971 (age 55)
- Party: Conservative Party
- Education: Norwegian Police University College; BI Norwegian Business School
- Occupation: Police officer, politician

Guro Angell Gimse (born 20 July 1971) is a Norwegian politician for the Conservative Party.

== Career ==
Born on 20 July 1971, Gimse is educated from the Norwegian Police University College, and the BI Norwegian Business School.

From 2011 to 2019 she was an elected member of the municipal council of Melhus Municipality. She was elected deputy representative to the Storting for the period 2017–2021 for the Conservative Party, from the constituency of Sør-Trøndelag. She replaced Linda C. Hofstad Helleland at the Storting from October 2017 to January 2019. From February 2019 to January 2020 she was appointed state secretary in the Ministry of Labour and Social Inclusion, and from January 2020 to October 2021 she again deputised for Helleland at the Storting. She also deputised for Mari Holm Lønseth from March to September 2025 while Lønseth was on parental leave. In the Storting, she was a member of the Standing Committee on Justice from 2017 to 2019, and a member of the Standing Committee on Business and Industry from 2020 to 2021.
