= Standing Committee on Local Government and Public Administration =

The Standing Committee on Local Government and Public Administration (Norwegian: Kommunal- og forvaltningskomiteen) is a standing committee of the Parliament of Norway. It is responsible for policies relating to local government, regional and rural policy, immigration policy, housing policy, building and construction, national minorities, Sami issues, matters relating to the organization and operation of state administration, government administration, personnel policy for state employees including pay and pensions, and economic support for political parties. It corresponds to the Ministry of Local Government and Regional Development and Ministry of Government Administration and Reform. The committee has 15 members and is chaired by Helge André Njåstad of the Progress Party.

== Members ==
=== 2025–present ===
Representative	Party	Position
Hanne Beate Stenvaag	Red Party	Chair
Erlend Wiborg	Progress Party	First Vice Chair
Sigurd Kvammen Rafaelsen	Labour Party	Second Vice Chair
Konstanse Marie Alvær	Labour Party	Member
Isak Veierud Busch	Labour Party	Member
Solveig Vestenfor	Labour Party	Member
Bjørn Larsen	Progress Party	Member
Rune Midtun	Progress Party	Member
Helge André Njåstad	Progress Party	Member
Mudassar Kapur	Conservative Party	Member
Tage Pettersen	Conservative Party	Member
Bengt Fasteraune	Centre Party	Member
Anne Lise Gjerstad Fredlund	Socialist Left Party	Member
Mari Holm Lønseth	Conservative Party	Member
Lene Vågslid	Labour Party	Member

=== 2021–2025 ===
Representative	Party	Position
Lene Vågslid	Labour Party	Chair
Helge André Njåstad	Progress Party	First Vice Chair
Heidi Greni	Centre Party	Second Vice Chair
Rune Støstad	Labour Party	Member
Per Martin Sandtrøen	Centre Party	Member
André N. Skjelstad	Liberal Party	Member
Jon Engen-Helgheim	Progress Party	Member
Mari Holm Lønseth	Conservative Party	Member
Mudassar Kapur	Conservative Party	Member
Tage Pettersen	Conservative Party	Member
Karin Andersen	Socialist Left Party	Member
Siv Mossleth	Centre Party	Member
Bengt Fasteraune	Centre Party	Member
Tommy A. Røynesdal	Red Party	Member
Lars Haltbrekken	Socialist Left Party	Member

=== 2017–2021 ===
Representative	Party	Position
Lene Vågslid	Labour Party	Chair
Kari Kjønaas Kjos	Progress Party	First Vice Chair
Rigmor Aasrud	Labour Party	Second Vice Chair
Stein Erik Lauvås	Labour Party	Member
Heidi Greni	Centre Party	Member
André N. Skjelstad	Liberal Party	Member
Jon Engen-Helgheim	Progress Party	Member
Helge André Njåstad	Progress Party	Member
Mari Holm Lønseth	Conservative Party	Member
Mudassar Kapur	Conservative Party	Member
Tage Pettersen	Conservative Party	Member
Heidi Nordby Lunde	Conservative Party	Member
Karin Andersen	Socialist Left Party	Member
Kjell Ingolf Ropstad	Christian Democratic Party	Member
Kjell-Børge Freiberg	Progress Party	Member
Siv Mossleth	Centre Party	Member

=== 2013–17 ===
Representative	Party	Position
Helge André Njåstad	Progress	Chair
Helga Pedersen	Labour	First deputy chair
Karin Andersen	Socialist Left	Second deputy chair
Jan Bøhler	Labour	
Heidi Greni	Centre	
Stine Renate Håheim	Labour	
Frank J. Jenssen	Conservative	
Mudassar Kapur	Conservative	
Mazyar Keshvari	Progress	
Stein Erik Lauvås	Labour	
Bjørn Lødemel	Conservative	
André N. Skjelstad	Liberal	
Ingjerd Schou	Conservative	
Eirik Sivertsen	Labour	
Geir S. Toskedal	Christian Democratic	

== Leadership ==
=== Chairs ===
Representative	Party	Term
Helge André Njåstad	Progress Party	22 October 2013 – 30 September 2017
Karin Andersen	Socialist Left Party	17 October 2017 – 30 September 2021
Lene Vågslid	Labour Party	21 October 2021 – 4 February 2025
Sverre Myrli	Labour Party	13 February 2025 – 30 September 2025
Hanne Beate Stenvaag	Red Party	15 October 2025 – present

=== First Vice Chairs ===
Representative	Party	Term
Helga Pedersen	Labour Party	22 October 2013 – 30 September 2017
Kari Kjønaas Kjos	Progress Party	17 October 2017 – 30 January 2020
Jon Engen-Helgheim	Progress Party	30 January 2020 – 25 February 2021
Helge André Njåstad	Progress Party	25 February 2021 – 21 March 2024
Erlend Wiborg	Progress Party	21 March 2024 – present

=== Second Vice Chairs ===
Representative	Party	Term
Karin Andersen	Socialist Left Party	22 October 2013 – 30 September 2017
Rigmor Aasrud	Labour Party	17 October 2017 – 19 January 2018
Eirik Sivertsen	Labour Party	30 January 2018 – 12 March 2020
Stein Erik Lauvås	Labour Party	12 March 2020 – 30 September 2021
Heidi Greni	Centre Party	21 October 2021 – 30 September 2025
Sigurd Kvammen Rafaelsen	Labour Party	15 October 2025 – present
