= Kristian P. Wilsgård =

Norwegian politician

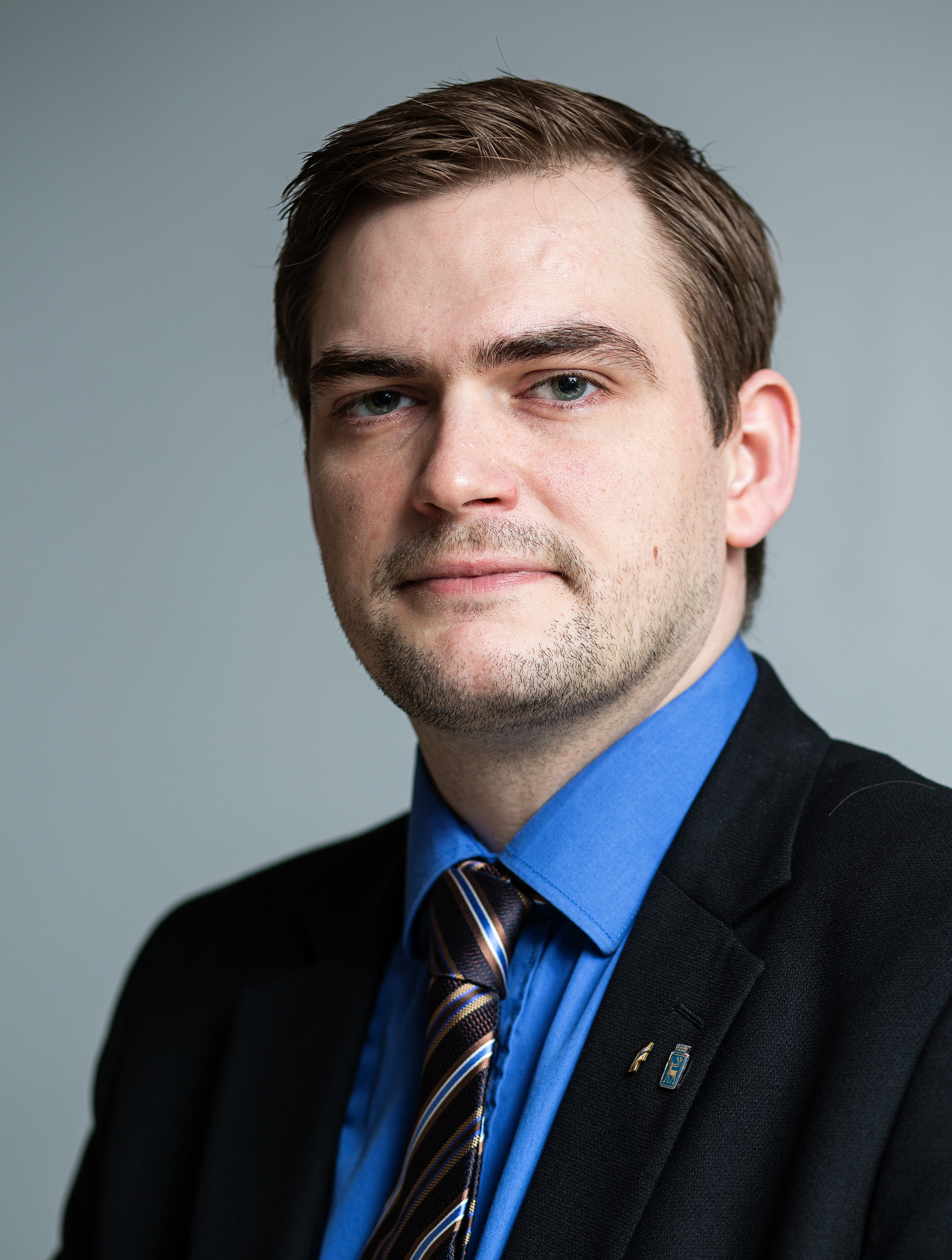
- Wilsgård in 2012
- Born: 11 January 1983 (age 43)
- Occupations: Businessman; Politician

Kristian P. Wilsgård (born 11 January 1983) is a Norwegian businessman and politician.

He hails from Torsken Municipality on the island of Senja, and resides in Tromsø.

He was elected deputy representative to the Storting for the period 2017–2021 for the Progress Party. He covered for cabinet member Per-Willy Amundsen at the Storting from October 2017.
