= Karin Andersen =

Norwegian politician (born 1952)

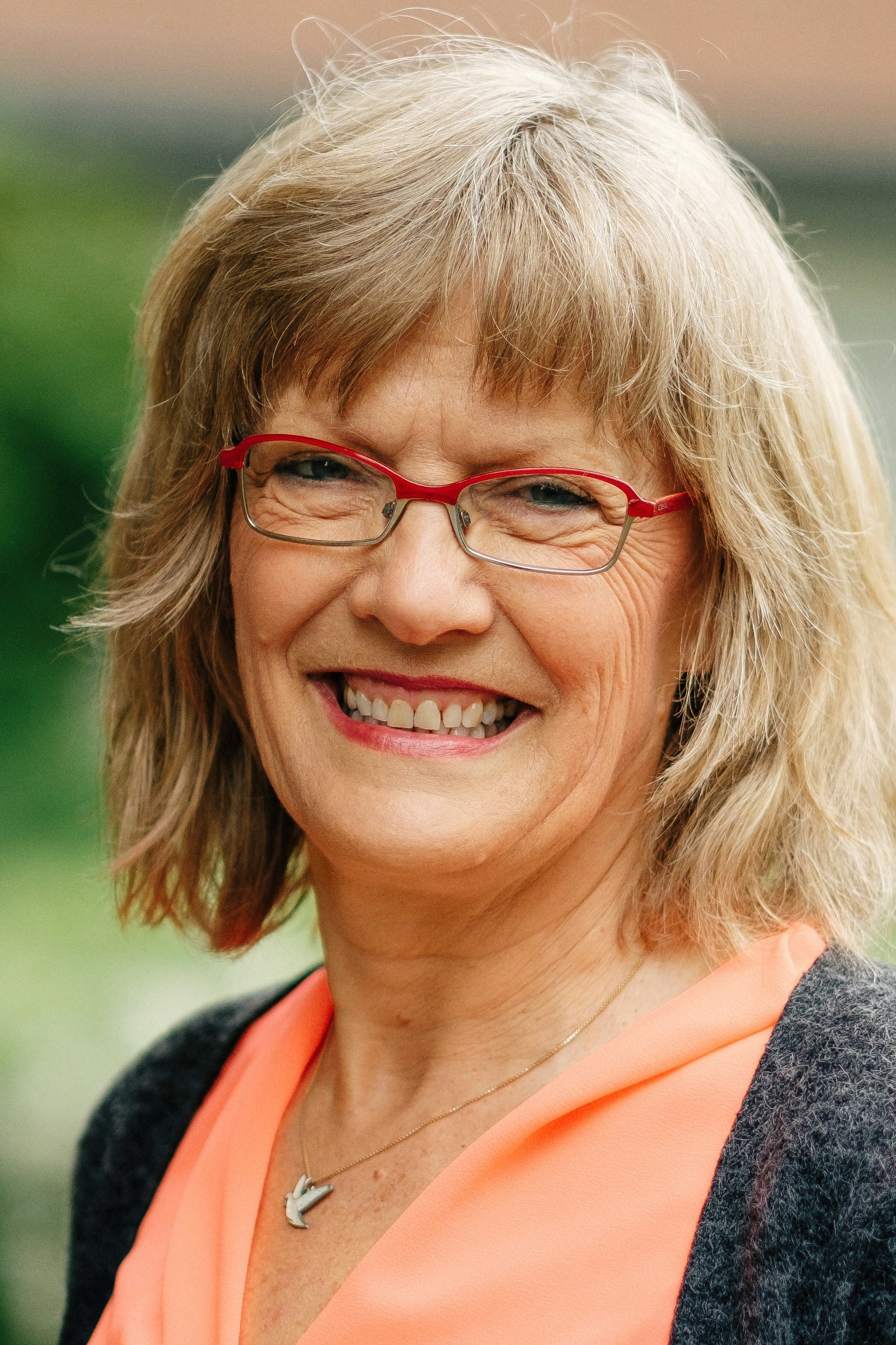
Karin Andersen in 2017

Karin Andersen (born 16 December 1952 in Kongsvinger) is a Norwegian politician for the Socialist Left Party (SV). She was elected to the Norwegian Parliament from Hedmark in 1997; she was not reelected in 2021. She had previously served as a deputy member from 1989-1993. | Prior to entering national politics she served in the Kongsvinger municipality council (1983–1997) and the Hedmark county council (1987–1995)

== Parliamentary Committee duties ==
- from 2017 - leader of the Standing Committee on Local Government and Public Administration.
- 2005 - 2009 leader of the Standing Committee on Labour and Social Affairs.
- 2001 - 2005 member of the Enlarged Foreign Affairs Committee.
- 2001 - 2005 member of the Standing Committee on Local Government and Public Administration.
- 2001 - 2005 member of the Electoral Committee.
- 1997 - 2005 member of the Standing Committee on Local Government and Public Administration.
- 1997 - 2001 member of the Fullmaktskommiteen.
