= Gry-Anette Rekanes Amundsen =

Norwegian politician

Deputy Representative to the Parliament of Norway
- Incumbent
- Assumed office 16 October 2013

Personal details
- Born: 7 July 1973 (age 53)
- Party: Progress Party
- Spouse: Per-Willy Amundsen (2009–present)

Gry-Anette Rekanes Amundsen (born 7 July 1973) is a Norwegian politician for the Progress Party.

She was elected to the municipal council for Nome Municipality, Telemark county council, and deputy leader of Telemark Progress Party. In the 2013 election she was elected as a deputy representative to the Parliament of Norway from Telemark, serving until 2017. She met during 46 days of parliamentary session.

In July 2009 she married fellow politician Per-Willy Amundsen. They divide their time between Oslo and their rural estate in Flåbygd in Telemark. In addition, they own a house together in Per-Willy Amundsen's native Harstad.
