= Mari Holm Lønseth =

Norwegian politician (born 1991)

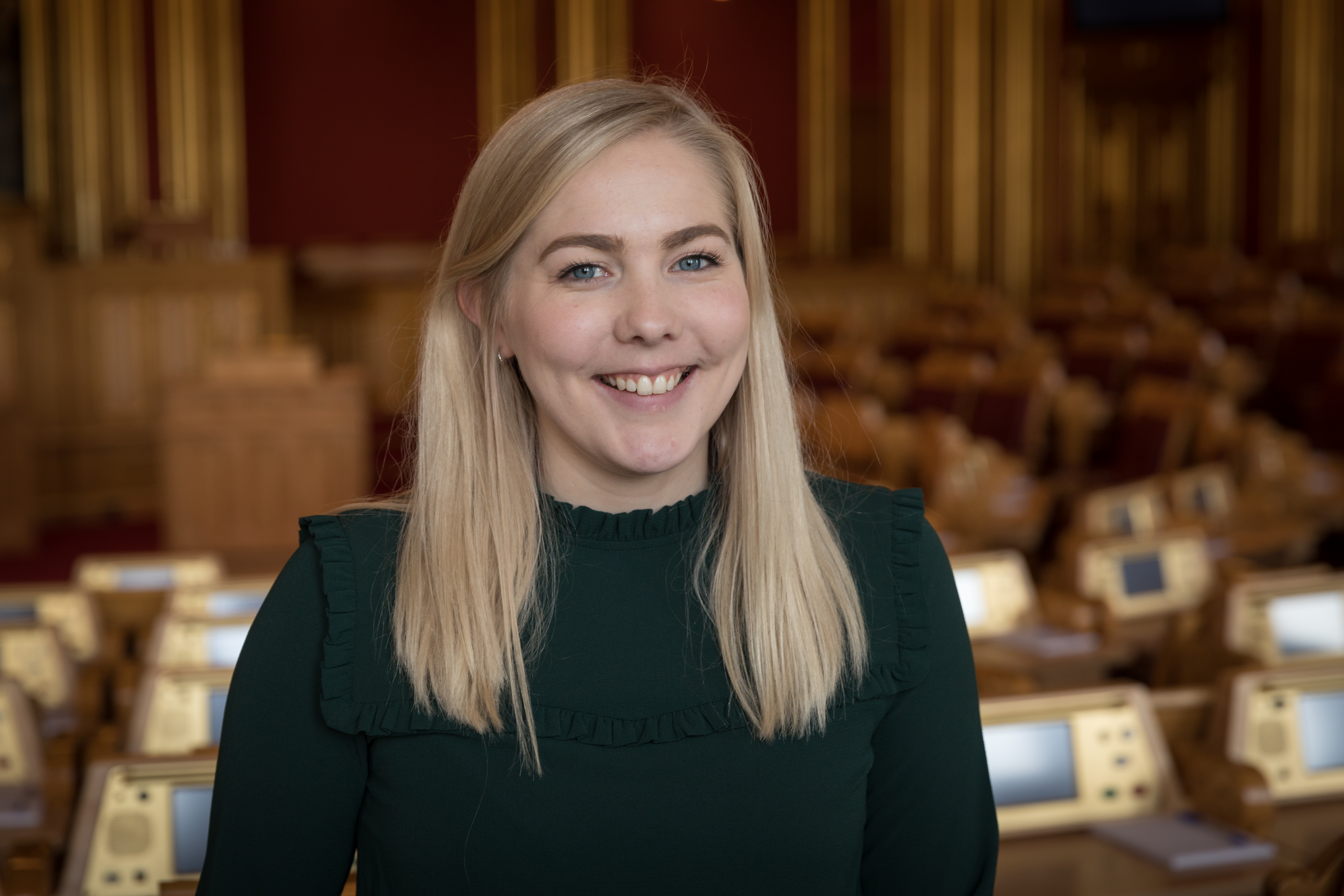

Member of the Storting
- Incumbent
- Assumed office 1 October 2017
- Deputy: Henrik Gottfries Kierulf (2025)
- Constituency: Sør-Trøndelag

Personal details
- Born: 29 August 1991 (age 35) Trondheim, Sør-Trøndelag, Norway
- Party: Conservative
- Spouse: Sivert Bjørnstad (m. 2024)
- Children: 1
- Education: University of Oslo
- Occupation: Jurist; Politician

Mari Holm Lønseth (born 29 August 1991) is a Norwegian jurist and politician. A member of the Conservative Party, she has served as member of parliament for Sør-Trøndelag since 2017.

== Political career ==
=== Youth politics ===
Holm Lønseth was a member of the Norwegian Young Conservatives of Trondheim, which she also led between 2010 and 2011. She went on to join the Sør-Trøndelag county branch of the Young Conservatives, which she led between 2011 and 2013.

=== Local politics ===
She was elected to the Trondheim Municipal Council at the 2011 local elections. She was re-elected in 2015 and sat until 2019.

=== Parliament ===
Holm Lønseth was elected to the Storting, the Norwegian parliament, at the 2017 election and won re-election in the 2021 election and the 2025 election. While she was on parental leave in 2025, Guro Angell Gimse (pre-2025 election) and Henrik Gottfries Kierulf (post-2025 election) was deputising for her at the Storting.

== Personal life ==
Holm Lønseth married Progress Party member of parliament Sivert Bjørnstad in March 2024. They welcomed their first child, a son, in March 2025.
