= Henrik Gottfries Kierulf =

Norwegian politician

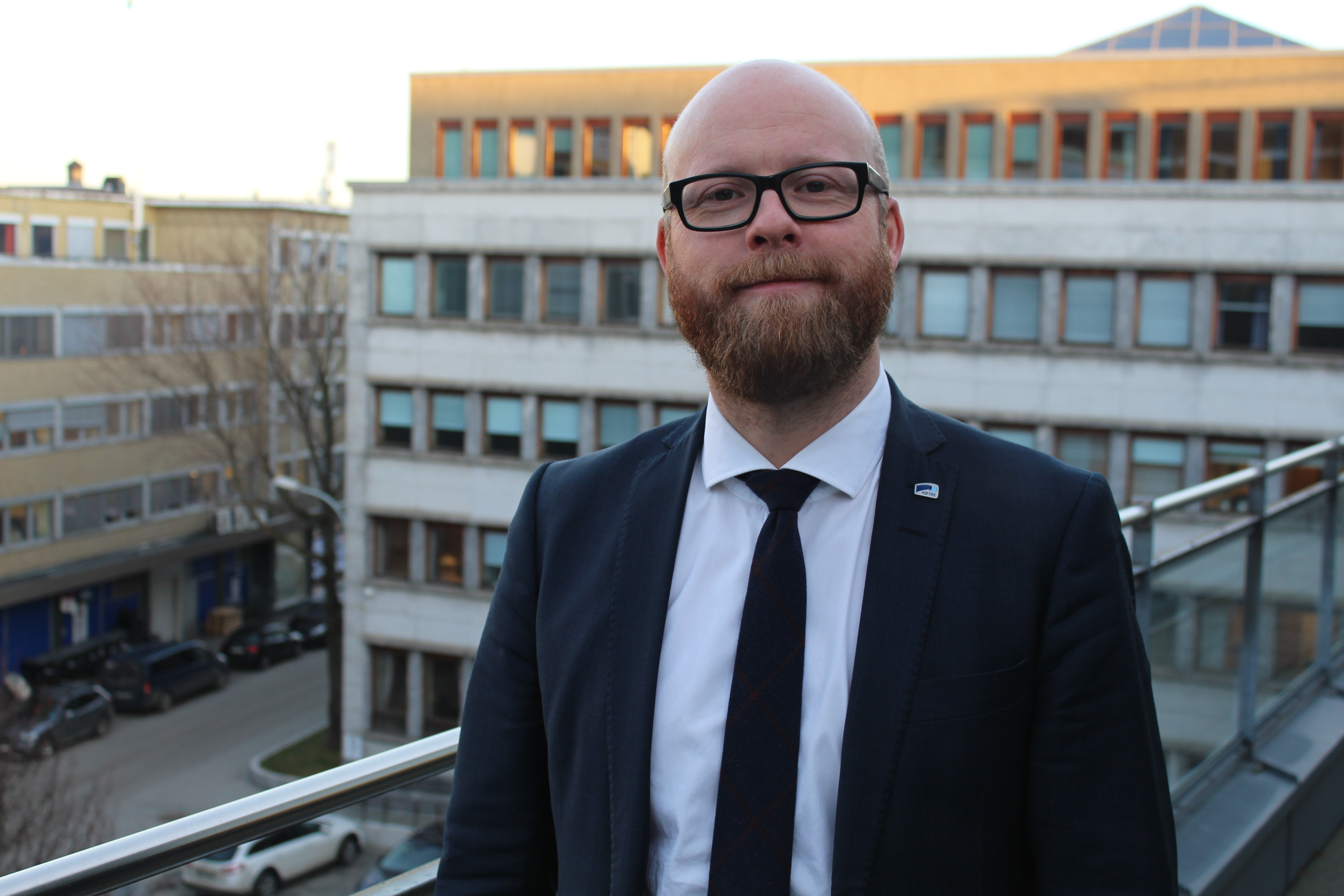

Deputy Member of the Storting
- Incumbent
- Assumed office 1 October 2021
- Deputising for: Mari Holm Lønseth (2025–)
- Constituency: Sør-Trøndelag

Personal details
- Born: 22 February 1981 (age 45) Trondheim, Norway
- Party: Conservative

Henrik Gottfries Kierulf (born 22 February 1981) is a Norwegian politician from the Conservative Party.

== Career ==
Kierulf was previously a member of Trøndelag County Council. He has been a deputy member to the Storting since the 2021 Norwegian parliamentary election and was actively meeting at the Storting for Mari Holm Lønseth after the 2025 Norwegian parliamentary election while she was on parental leave.
