= Nordic Freedom =

Right-wing to far-right party group in the Nordic Council

Nordic Freedom: Nordisk frihet (Swedish); Vapaa Pohjola (Finnish); Nordisk frihed (Danish); Nordisk frihet (Norwegian); Norrænt frelsi (Icelandic)
- Abbreviation: NF
- President: (Sweden) Aron Emilsson
- General Secretary: (Denmark) Karsten Lorentzen
- Founded: Spring 2012
- Headquarters: Christiansborg, 1240 Copenhagen
- Ideology: National conservatism Right-wing populism Euroscepticism
- Political position: Right-wing to far-right
- European affiliation: European Conservatives and Reformists Party (majority); Patriots.eu (DPP)
- European Parliament group: European Conservatives and Reformists Group (majority); Patriots for Europe (DPP)
- Colours: Black; Dark purple
- Nordic Council: 8 / 87
- European Parliament (Scandinavian seats): 5 / 70

Website
- nordiskfrihet.se

Nordic Freedom (Danish: Nordisk frihed; Swedish: Nordisk frihet) is a right-wing to far right party group in the Nordic Council and an alliance in the European Parliament.

== European Parliament ==
In July 2024, Nordic Freedom expanded to the European Parliament as an alliance within the European Conservatives and Reformists, with the Sweden Democrats, Finns Party and Denmark Democrats as its members.

== Members ==
The member organizations of the Nordic Freedom are:

Country	National party	EP party	EP group	Nordic Council	MEPs		National MPs		Status
Country	National party	EP party	EP group	Nordic Council	# of seats	Last election	# of seats	Last election	Status
Denmark	Danish People's Party (DPP); Dansk Folkeparti (DF)	Patriots.eu	PfE	1 / 16	1 / 15 (Note: Not a member of the Nordic Freedom alliance in the European Parliament.)	2024	16 / 179	2026	Opposition
Denmark	Denmark Democrats; Danmarksdemokraterne (DD)	ECR Party	ECR Group	2 / 16 (Note: Not a member of the Nordic Freedom group in the Nordic Council.)	1 / 15	2024	10 / 179	2026	Opposition
Finland	Finns Party; Perussuomalaiset (PS), Sannfinländarna (Sannf)	ECR Party	ECR Group (Note: Formerly part of Identity and Democracy (ID) from 2019 till 2023.)	4 / 18	1 / 15	2024	46 / 200	2023	Coalition
Sweden	Sweden Democrats; Sverigedemokraterna (SD)	ECR Party	ECR Group	4 / 20	3 / 21	2024	73 / 349	2022	Confidence and supply

The Norwegian Progress Party (Bokmål: Fremskrittspartiet; Nynorsk: Framstegspartiet, FrP) was invited into the group in 2017 but they refused to join.

== Elected representatives of Member Parties ==
=== European institutions ===
Organisation	Institution	Number of seats
European Union	European Parliament	5 / 720 (0.7%)
European Union	European Commission	0 / 27 (0%)
European Union	European Council (Heads of Government)	0 / 27 (0%)
European Union	Council of the European Union (Participation in Government)	0 / 27 (0%)
European Union	Committee of the Regions	
Council of Europe	Parliamentary Assembly	
