= The Social Democratic Group =

Social democratic party group in the Nordic Council

The Social Democratic Group: Socialdemokratiska gruppen (Swedish); Sosiaalidemokraattinen ryhmä (Finnish); Socialdemokratisk gruppe (Danish); Sosialdemokratisk gruppe (Norwegian); Jafnaðarmannahópur (Icelandic)
- Abbreviation: S-Norden
- Chairman: (Norway) Martin Kolberg
- Vice chair: (Denmark) Annette Lind
- Founded: 5 October 2011
- Headquarters: Copenhagen, Denmark
- Ideology: Social democracy
- Political position: Centre-left
- European affiliation: Party of European Socialists
- European Parliament group: Progressive Alliance of Socialists and Democrats
- Colours: Red; Green
- Nordic Council: 22 / 87

Website
- s-norden.org

The Social Democratic Group is a social democratic party group in the Nordic Council, making up the largest group on the council. Their members come from all of the Nordic countries, and includes the Faroe Islands, Greenland and Åland. Their main aims are sustainable development, tackling climate change, and reduction in inequality, concomitant with a robust welfare system. The group is strongly opposed to the privatisation of state assets.

== Members ==
The member organizations of the Social Democratic Group are:

Country	National party	Nordic Council	National MPs				European MPs		Status
Country	National party	Nordic Council	# of seats	Last election	# of seats	Last election	# of seats	Last election	Status
Åland	Åland Social Democrats (Ålands Socialdemokrater)	0 / 2	4 / 30	2023	0 / 200 0 / 1	2023	0 / 14	2024	Government
Denmark	Social Democrats (Socialdemokratiet)	3 / 16	38 / 175	2026	38 / 179	2026	3 / 14	2024	Government
Faroe Islands	Social Democratic Party (Javnaðarflokkurin)	0 / 2	6 / 33	2026	1 / 179 1 / 2	2026	Not in EU		Junior partner
Finland	Social Democratic Party (Suomen sosialidemokraattinen puolue/ Finlands socialdemokratiska parti)	4 / 18	43 / 200	2023	43 / 200	2023	2 / 14	2024	Opposition
Greenland	Forward (Siumut)	0 / 2	4 / 31	2025	0 / 179 0 / 2	2026	Not in EU		Opposition
Iceland	Social Democratic Alliance (Samfylkingin jafnaðarmannaflokkur Íslands)	2 / 7	15 / 63			2024	Not in EU		Government
Norway	Labour Party (Arbeiderpartiet/Arbeidarpartiet/Bargiidbellodat)	6 / 20	53 / 169			2025	Not in EU		Government
Sweden	Social Democratic Workers' Party (Sveriges socialdemokratiska arbetareparti)	7 / 20	99 / 349			2026	5 / 20	2024	TBD

In the European Parliament, the MEPs of the member parties are part of the Progressive Alliance of Socialists and Democrats parliamentary group.

== Elected representatives of Member Parties ==
The red rose, a common symbol of social democracy. Nearly all member parties use the red rose as their logo or symbol.

=== European institutions ===
Organisation	Institution	Number of seats
European Union	European Parliament	10 / 720 (1%)
European Union	European Commission	1 / 27 (4%)
European Union	European Council (Heads of Government)	1 / 27 (4%)
European Union	Council of the European Union (Participation in Government)	1 / 27 (4%)
European Union	Committee of the Regions	
Council of Europe	Parliamentary Assembly	

== See also ==
- SAMAK
- Nordic Council
