= Centre Group =

Centrist party group in the Nordic Council

Centre Group: Midtergruppen (Danish); Keskiryhmä (Finnish); Flokkahópur miðjumanna (Icelandic); Midtengruppen (Norwegian); Mittengruppen (Swedish)
- Abbreviation: MG
- Chairperson: (Iceland) Hanna Katrín Friðriksson
- General Secretary: (Finland) Jouni Ovaska
- Founded: February 1983
- Ideology: Centrism; Factions: Liberalism; Christian democracy Green politics Agrarianism (Nordic)
- Political position: Centre; Factions: Centre-right to centre-left
- European affiliation: ALDE, EFA, EGP, EPP
- European Parliament group: Renew, Greens/EFA, EPP Group
- Colours: Orange; Purple
- Slogan: "We make the Nordics bigger!" (Swedish: "Vi gör Norden större!")
- Nordic Council: 24 / 87

Website
- mittengruppen.org

The Centre Group (Danish: Midtergruppen; Finnish: Keskiryhmä; Icelandic: Flokkahópur miðjumanna; Norwegian: Midtengruppen; Swedish: Mittengruppen) is a centrist party group in the Nordic Council. It consists of various political families, such as Christian democrats, liberals, agrarians and greens.

== Members ==
The member organizations of the Centre Group are:

Country or territory	National party	Nordic Council	National MPs				MEPs		Status
Country or territory	National party	Nordic Council	# of seats	Last election	# of seats	Last election	# of seats	Last election	Status
Åland	Liberals for Åland (Liberalerna på Åland)	1 / 2	9 / 30	2023	0 / 200 0 / 1	2023	0 / 14	2024	Junior partner
Åland	Åland Centre (Åländsk Centern)	0 / 2	7 / 30	2023	1 / 200 1 / 1	2023	0 / 14	2024	Junior partner
Åland	Sustainable Initiative (Hållbart Initiativ)	0 / 2	1 / 30	2023	0 / 200 0 / 1	2023	0 / 14	2024	Opposition
Åland	Future of Åland (Ålands Framtid)	0 / 2	0 / 30	2023	0 / 200 0 / 1	2023	0 / 14	2024	Opposition
Denmark	Venstre (Venstre, Danmarks Liberale Parti)	1 / 16	23 / 175	2022	18 / 179	2026	2 / 15	2024	Junior partner
Denmark	Moderates (Moderaterne)	1 / 16	16 / 175	2022	14 / 179	2026	1 / 15	2024	Junior partner
Denmark	Liberal Alliance (Liberal Alliance)	1 / 16	14 / 175	2022	16 / 179	2026	1 / 15	2024	Opposition
Denmark	Social Liberal Party (Radikale Venstre)	0 / 16	7 / 175	2022	10 / 179	2026	1 / 15	2024	Opposition
Faroe Islands	Union Party (Sambandsflokkurin)	2 / 20 (Note: Johan Dahl is part of the Faroese delegation while Anna Falkenberg is part of the Danish delegation.)	7 / 33	2026	1 / 179 1 / 2	2026	Not in EU		Junior partner
Faroe Islands	Centre Party (Miðflokkurin)	0 / 2	2 / 33	2026	0 / 179 0 / 2	2026	Not in EU		Opposition
Faroe Islands	Progress (Framsókn)	0 / 2	2 / 33	2026	0 / 179 0 / 2	2026	Not in EU		Opposition
Faroe Islands	Sjálvstýri	0 / 2	1 / 33	2026	0 / 179 0 / 2	2026	Not in EU		Opposition
Finland	Centre Party (Suomen Keskusta/Centern i Finland)	2 / 18	23 / 200	2023	23 / 200	2023	2 / 14	2024	Opposition
Finland	Green League (Vihreä liitto/Gröna förbundet/Ruoná lihttu)	1 / 18	13 / 200	2023	13 / 200	2023	2 / 14	2024	Opposition
Finland	Swedish People's Party of Finland (Suomen ruotsalainen kansanpuolue/ Svenska folkpartiet i Finland)	1 / 18	9 / 200	2023	9 / 200	2023	1 / 14	2024	Junior partner
Finland	Christian Democrats (Kristillisdemokraatit/Kristdemokraterna)	0 / 18	5 / 200	2023	5 / 200	2023	0 / 14	2024	Junior partner
Greenland	Democrats (Demokraatit/Demokraterne)	0 / 2	10 / 31	2025	0 / 179 0 / 2	2022	Not in EU		Opposition
Greenland	Solidarity (Atassut)	0 / 2	2 / 31	2025	0 / 179 0 / 2	2022	Not in EU		Confidence and supply
Greenland	Cooperation Party (Suleqatigiissitsisut/Samarbejdspartiet)	0 / 2	0 / 31	2025	0 / 179 0 / 2	2022	Not in EU		Opposition
Iceland	Progressive Party (Framsóknarflokkurinn)	1 / 7	5 / 63			2024	Not in EU		Opposition
Iceland	People's Party (Flokkur Fólksins)	1 / 7	10 / 63			2024	Not in EU		Junior partner
Iceland	Viðreisn	1 / 7	11 / 63			2024	Not in EU		Junior partner
Iceland	Centre Party (Miðflokkurinn)	0 / 7	8 / 63			2024	Not in EU		Opposition
Norway	Centre Party (Senterpartiet/Guovddášbellodat)	3 / 20	9 / 169			2025	Not in EU		Support
Norway	Liberal Party (Venstre/Gurutbellodat)	1 / 20	3 / 169			2025	Not in EU		Opposition
Norway	Christian Democratic Party (Kristelig Folkeparti/Risttalaš Álbmotbellodat)	0 / 20	7 / 169			2025	Not in EU		Opposition
Norway	Green Party (Miljøpartiet De Grønne/Birasbellodat Ruonát)	0 / 20	8 / 169			2025	Not in EU		Support
Sweden	Centre Party (Centerpartiet)	1 / 20	24 / 349			2022	2 / 20	2024	Opposition
Sweden	Christian Democrats (Kristdemokraterna)	1 / 20	19 / 349			2022	1 / 20	2024	Junior partner
Sweden	Liberals (Liberalerna)	1 / 20	16 / 349			2022	1 / 20	2024	Junior partner
Sweden	Green Party (Miljöpartiet de gröna)	1 / 20	18 / 349			2022	3 / 20	2024	Opposition

The liberal parties of Denmark, Sweden and Norway, the centre parties of Finland and Sweden, the Swedish People's Party of Finland and Viðreisn are members of the ALDE and Renew Europe; the Christian Democrats of Denmark, Finland and Sweden are members of the European People's Party and the European People's Party Group; the green parties are members of the European Green Party and Greens–EFA, while Future of Åland is a member of the European Free Alliance.

== Elected representatives of Member Parties ==
=== European institutions ===
Organisation	Institution	Number of seats
European Union	European Parliament	17 / 720 (2%)
European Union	European Commission	1 / 27 (4%)
European Union	European Council (Heads of Government)	0 / 27 (0%)
European Union	Council of the European Union (Participation in Government)	2 / 27 (7%)
European Union	Committee of the Regions	
Council of Europe	Parliamentary Assembly	
