= Heidi Greni =

Norwegian politician (born 1962)

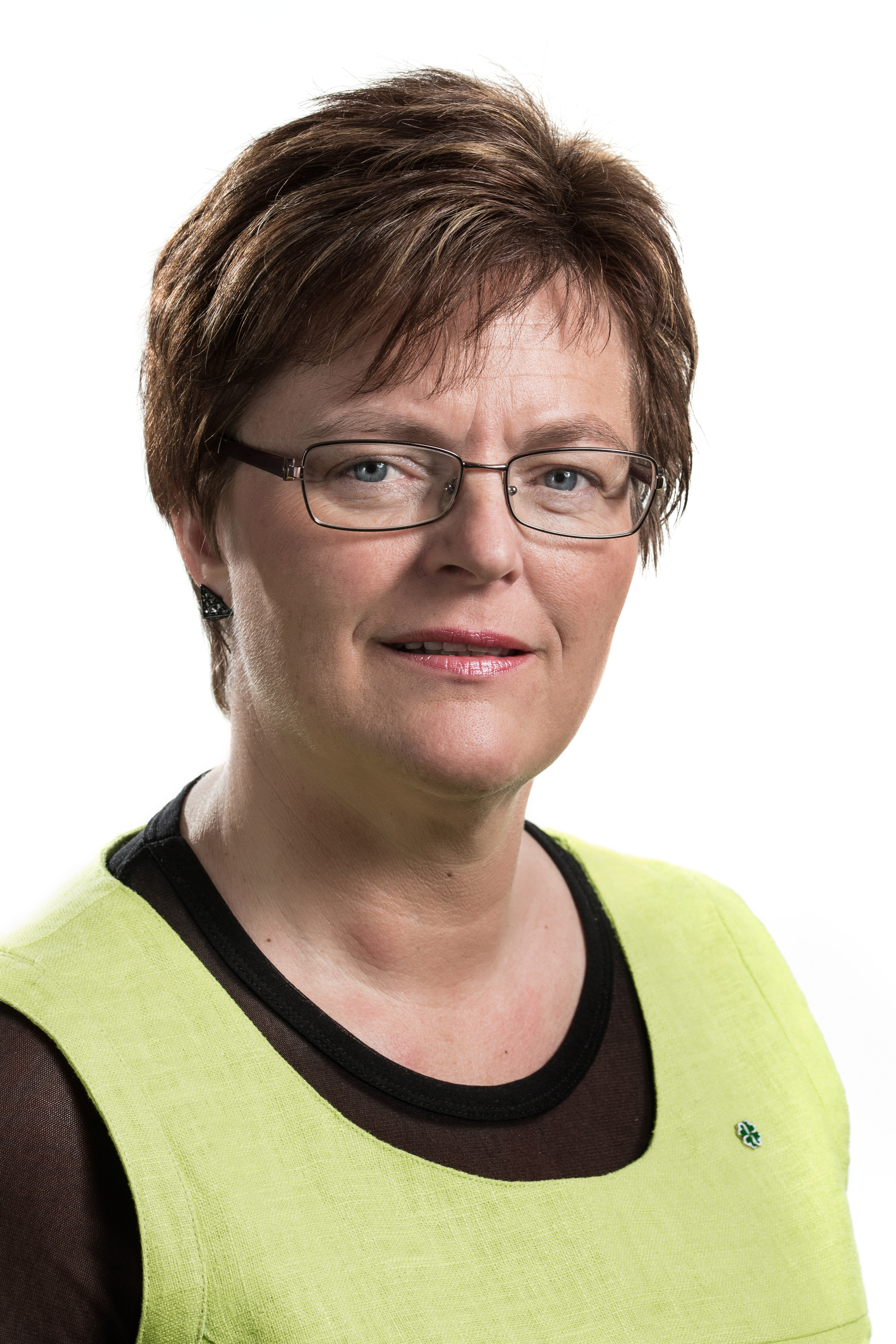
Heidi Greni

Heidi Greni (born 3 July 1962) is a Norwegian politician for the Centre Party.

She served as a deputy representative to the Parliament of Norway from Sør-Trøndelag during the term 2009–2013. In March 2011, when regular representative Ola Borten Moe joined the cabinet, Greni became a full representative. She joined the Standing Committee on Local Government and Public Administration.

She hails from Ålen, and in the 2011 Norwegian local elections she was elected as mayor of Holtålen Municipality as the first non-Labour mayor in 104 years.
