= Conservative Group =

Conservative party group in the Nordic Council

Conservative Group: Konservativa gruppen (Swedish); Konservatiivinen ryhmä (Finnish); Den Konservative Gruppe (Danish); Den konservative gruppen (Norwegian); Flokkahópur hægrimanna (Icelandic)
- Chairperson: (Sweden) Hans Wallmark
- Vice chair: (Norway) Michael Tetzschner
- Founded: 28 October 2015
- Headquarters: Christiansborg DK-1240 København K
- Youth wing: Nordic Young Conservative Union
- Ideology: Conservatism; Liberal conservatism Economic liberalism
- Political position: Centre-right
- European affiliation: European People's Party
- European Parliament group: European People's Party group
- Colours: Blue
- Nordic Council: 13 / 87

Website
- Page on Nordic Council

The Conservative Group is a conservative party group in the Nordic Council.

== Members ==
The member organizations of the Conservative Group are:

Country	National party	Nordic Council	National MPs				European MPs		Status
Country	National party	Nordic Council	# of seats	Last election	# of seats	Last election	# of seats	Last election	Status
Åland	Moderate Coalition for Åland (Moderat Samling för Åland)	1 / 2	4 / 30	2023	0 / 200 0 / 1	2023	0 / 14	2019	Junior partner
Åland	Non-aligned Coalition (Obunden Samling)	0 / 2	5 / 30	2023	0 / 200 0 / 1	2023	0 / 14	2019	Junior partner
Denmark	Conservative People's Party (Det Konservative Folkeparti)	1 / 16	10 / 175	2022	13 / 179	2026	1 / 14	2019	Opposition
Faroe Islands	People's Party (Fólkaflokkurin)	0 / 2	9 / 33	2026	0 / 179 0 / 2	2026	Not in EU		Government
Finland	National Coalition Party (Kansallinen Kokoomus/Samlingspartiet)	4 / 18	48 / 199	2023	48 / 200	2023	4 / 14	2024	Government
Iceland	Independence Party (Sjálfstæðisflokkurinn)	2 / 7	14 / 63			2024	Not in EU		Opposition
Norway	Conservative Party (Høyre/Høgre/Olgešbellodat)	4 / 20	24 / 169			2025	Not in EU		Opposition
Sweden	Moderate Party (Moderata samlingspartiet)	4 / 20	68 / 349			2022	4 / 20	2019	Government

In the European Parliament, the MEPs of the member parties are part of the European People's Party parliamentary group.

== Elected representatives of member parties ==
=== European institutions ===
Organisation	Institution	Number of seats
European Union	European Parliament	8 / 720 (1%)
European Union	European Commission	0 / 27 (0%)
European Union	European Council (Heads of Government)	2 / 27 (7%)
European Union	Council of the European Union (Participation in Government)	2 / 27 (7%)
European Union	Committee of the Regions	
Council of Europe	Parliamentary Assembly	
