= Helge André Njåstad =

Norwegian politician

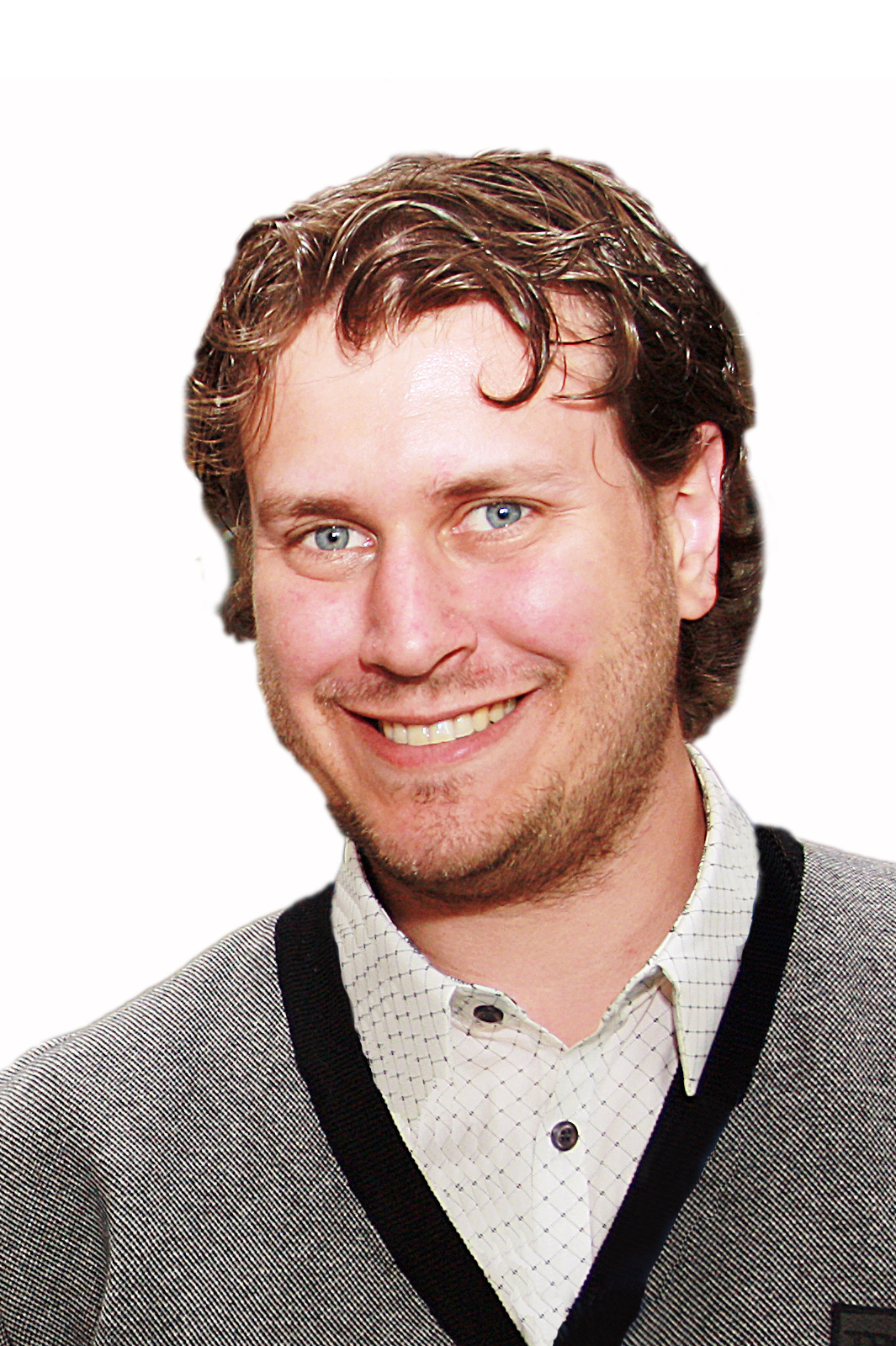

Member of the Storting
- Incumbent
- Assumed office 1 October 2013
- Constituency: Hordaland

Mayor of Austevoll Municipality
- In office 12 November 2003 – 4 November 2013
- Deputy: Edvard Johannes Stangeland
- Preceded by: Olav P. Årland
- Succeeded by: Renate Møgster Klepsvik

Personal details
- Born: 5 June 1980 (age 46) Bergen, Hordaland, Norway
- Party: Progress
- Children: 1
- Education: Bergen Cathedral School (1999)

Helge André Njåstad (born 5 June 1980) is a Norwegian politician for the Progress Party. He has served as a member of the Storting for Hordaland since 2013. He also served as mayor of Austevoll Municipality from 2003 to 2013.

== Education and private career ==
After finishing high school at Bergen Cathedral School in 1999, he started working in a local graphic design company in Austevoll which he went on to lead.

== Local politics ==
Njåstad became a member of the Progress Party in 1997. Two years later, he was elected to the municipal council of Austevoll Municipality, benefitting from cumulative voting. The Austervoll municipal election in 2003 turned out to be a great success for the Progress party which increased their share of the votes from 19,6% in 1999 to 33.2%. A cooperation with the Centre Party and Christian Democratic Party led to Njåstad becoming mayor. He had been nominated in second spot on the local party's ballot, but cumulative voting again showed him the party's most popular figure. Aged 23, he became Norway's youngest mayor. He was the second mayor ever from the Progress party; the first one being Terje Søviknes from the nearby Os municipality.

The municipality of about 4,800 inhabitants and a large fishing industry and much private wealth was at the time struggling with heavy debt and had been on the ROBEK list for municipalities with negative budget balances since the list was introduced in 2001. Njåstad campaigned on a platform of bringing more positivity to the community. During Njåstad's mayoralty, the budget was balanced, including many cuts in appropriations for schools, child care and elder care, but most decisions had broad consensus. The municipality was taken off the ROBEK list in 2012 after the budget deficit had been turned into a surplus.

Njåstad received credit for turning the local economy around during his 10 years of service. and was voted municipality profile of the year for 2012 by Kommunal Rapport for his successful handling of the economy and having creating new optimism in Austervoll.

In 2013, the municipality privatised all elderly care services. The municipality still has all financial responsibilities for the care but all institutions are run by the privately owned Swedish company Alaris. 170 employees were transferred from the public sector to Alaris. The privatisation had broad consensus in the municipality council, but the two Labour Party members voted against it and the unions protested, fearing that the privatisation will lead to reduced pensions and other working conditions for the caregivers. The municipality was the first and only in Norway to privatise all elderly care.

Njåstad has been a member of the Hordaland county council since 2003.

== National politics ==
At the party's congress in 2011, he was elected to the party's Executive Board. He got 200 of 219 votes cast, which was the highest number of the four candidates, of which three were elected.

In the 2013 Norwegian parliamentary election, Njåstad was nominated in second spot on Hordaland Progress Party's ballot. The party got 15.1% of the votes in the election, back 7.2% from the election in 2009. The party lost two seats, but the second seat to Njåstad was secured. In Austevoll, the Progress party got 25.5% which was back 8.8% from 2009.

Njåstad was mentioned as a possible Minister for the fisheries in the Solberg's Cabinet by several newspapers. In the parliament he was elected chair of the Standing Committee on Local Government and Public Administration in October 2013.

On 14 March 2024, he was appointed chair of the Standing Committee on Justice following Per-Willy Amundsen's resignation due to controversial Facebook posts.

== Political positions ==
Njåstad has argued that Austevoll's full privatisation of the elderly care could be a model for the whole country. He believes the rights of welfare clients are better served when the municipality's sole responsibility is to assign welfare services and control the quality of it, as he thinks the control function suffers when both the controllers and those providing services are public employees and there may not be enough distance between them.

He cites transportation and fisheries policies as main priorities. He favours a liberalisation of the fishery policy, including perpetual fishing quotas in line with the system introduced by Conservative Minister of Fisheries Svein Ludvigsen but reversed by Labour minister Helga Pedersen.

Like his party, Njåstad has voiced strong opposition to toll roads. During the election campaign in 2013, he participated in an election stunt where a mock toll road was set up and campaigners for the Progress party gave out small sums of money to protest the system where drivers are required to pay. The stunt was criticised by a Workers' Youth League member for being an attempt of buying voters, but Njåstad claimed it was no different from other parties handing out small effects, like the roses typically handed out by the Labour Party.

He has cited Carl I. Hagen as his political inspiration.

== Personal life ==
Njåstad is in a cohabitation and has a son. He has cited Bruce Springsteen and Ausekarane as musical favourites and Frode Grytten as a favourite in literature.

== Controversy ==
In January 2019, NRK and consequently all major media outlet in Norway reported that Njåstad let several of his travel costs for personal arrangements but with minor job related pretext, including the 60th birthday party of his mother, be reimbursed by the Storting and from tax payers' pocket. The deeds by Njåstad were called by media and the members of the public as 'unwise', and 'maybe legal but very stupid'. In light of fellow party member, Mazyar Keshvari, who was charged with gross fraud for another travel reimbursement controversy, Njåstad's case absorbed much attention in Norway. Some reevaluation of travel regulations for the Storting's representatives were also suggested.
