= Faroe Islands =

Autonomous territory of Denmark

Faroe Islands Føroyar (Faroese) Færøerne (Danish)
- Autonomous territory in the Kingdom of Denmark
- Flag Coat of arms
- Anthem: "Tú alfagra land mítt" (Faroese) (English: "Thou, fairest land of mine")
- Royal anthems: Der er et yndigt land (Danish) (English: "There is a lovely country") Kong Christian stod ved højen mast (Danish) (English: "King Christian stood by the lofty mast")
- Location of the Faroe Islands (green) in Europe (green and dark grey)

- Location of the Faroe Islands (red; circled) in the Kingdom of Denmark (light yellow)
- Sovereign state: Kingdom of Denmark
- Settlement: Early 9th century
- Union with Norway: c. 1035
- Kalmar Union: 1397–1523
- Denmark-Norway: 1523–1814
- Unification with Denmark: 14 January 1814
- Independence referendum: 14 September 1946
- Home rule: 23 March 1948
- Further autonomy: 29 July 2005
- Capital and largest city: Tórshavn; 62°00′N 06°47′W
- Official languages: Faroese; Danish (Note: The national language of the Faroe Islands is Faroese. Danish is the official second language.)
- Ethnic groups: Faroe Islanders
- Religion: Lutheranism (Church of the Faroe Islands)
- Demonym(s): Faroe Islander; Faroese
- Government: Devolved governments within a parliamentary constitutional monarchy
  - Monarch: Frederik X
  - Prime Minister of Denmark: Mette Frederiksen
  - High Commissioner: Lene Moyell Johansen
  - Faroese Prime Minister: Beinir Johannesen
  - Faroese Deputy Prime Minister: Bárður á Steig Nielsen
- Legislature: Folketinget (Realm legislature); Løgting (Local legislature)

National representation
  - Folketing: 2 members

Area
  - Total: 1,393 km^{2} (538 sq mi) (not ranked)
  - Water (%): 0.5
- Highest elevation: 882 m (2,894 ft)

Population
  - July 2026 estimate: 55,466 (214th)
  - 2011 census: 48,346
  - Density: 39.8/km^{2} (103.1/sq mi)
- GDP (PPP): 2024 estimate
  - Total: US$4.478B (not ranked)
  - Per capita: US$81,908 (not ranked)
- GDP (nominal): 2024 estimate
  - Total: US$4.052B (not ranked)
  - Per capita: US$74,119 (not ranked)
- Gini (2018): ▲22.71 low · Not ranked
- HDI (2008): 0.950 very high
- Currency: Faroese króna; Danish krone; (DKK)
- Time zone: UTC±00:00 (WET)
  - Summer (DST): UTC+01:00 (WEST)
- Driving side: Right
- Calling code: +298
- Postal code: FO-xxx
- ISO 3166 code: FO
- Internet TLD: .fo

The Faroe Islands (Note: (Faroese: Føroyar, pronounced [ˈfœɹjaɹ]; Danish: Færøerne [ˈfeɐ̯ˌøˀɐnə])) (/ˈfɛəroʊ/ FAIR-oh), also known as the Faroes, are an archipelago in the North Atlantic Ocean and a rigsdel ('autonomous territory') of the Kingdom of Denmark. Located between Iceland, Norway, and the Hebrides and Shetland isles of Scotland, the islands have a population of 55,466 as of July 2026 and a land area of 1,393 km^{2} (538 sq mi). The official language is Faroese, which is partially mutually intelligible with Icelandic. The terrain is rugged, dominated by fjords and cliffs with sparse vegetation and few trees. As a result of their proximity to the Arctic Circle, the islands experience perpetual civil twilight during summer nights and very short winter days; nevertheless, they experience a subpolar oceanic climate and mild temperatures year-round due to the Gulf Stream. The capital, Tórshavn, receives the fewest recorded hours of sunshine of any city in the world at only 840 hours per year.

Færeyinga saga and the writings of Dicuil date initial Norse settlement in the early 9th century, with Grímur Kamban recorded as the first permanent settler. The islands were initially believed to be mainly settled by Norwegians and Norse-Gaels who also brought thralls (i.e. slaves or serfs) of Gaelic origin, as with Iceland; this was disproved by a 2024 study, which found the origins to be different.

Initially governed as an independent commonwealth under the Løgting, the islands came under Norwegian rule in the early 11th century after the introduction of Christianity by Sigmundur Brestisson. The Faroe Islands followed Norway's integration into the Kalmar Union in 1397 and came under de facto Danish rule following that union's dissolution in 1523. Following the introduction of Lutheranism in 1538, the Faroese language was banned in public institutions and disappeared from writing for more than three centuries. The islands were formally ceded to Denmark in 1814 by the Treaty of Kiel along with Greenland and Iceland, and the Løgting was subsequently replaced by a Danish judiciary.

Following the re-establishment of the Løgting and an official Faroese orthography, the Faroese language conflict saw Danish being gradually displaced by Faroese as the language of the church, public education, and law in the first half of the 20th century. The islands were occupied by the British during the Second World War, who refrained from governing Faroese internal affairs: inspired by this period of relative self-government and the declaration of Iceland as a republic in 1944, the islands held a referendum in 1946 that resulted in a narrow majority for independence. The results were annulled by King Christian X, and subsequent negotiations led to the Faroe Islands being granted home rule in 1948.

Within the Kingdom of Denmark, the Faroe Islands are self-governing apart from defence, policing, justice and currency, with partial control over foreign affairs. Because the Faroe Islands are not part of the same customs area as Denmark, they have an independent trade policy and can establish their own trade agreements. The islands have an extensive bilateral free trade agreement with Iceland, known as the Hoyvík Agreement. In certain sports, the Faroe Islands field their own national teams. In the Nordic Council and Council of Europe, they are represented as part of the Danish delegation.

The islands' fishing industry accounts for around 90% of their exports, with tourism becoming increasingly prominent since the 2010s. They did not become a part of the European Economic Community (EEC) in 1973, instead keeping autonomy over their own fishing waters; as a result, the Faroe Islands are not a part of the European Union (EU) today. The Løgting, although it was suspended between 1816 and 1852, claims to be one of the oldest continuously running parliaments in the world.

== Etymology ==
The islands' endonym Føroyar, as well as the English exonym Faroe Islands (alt. Faeroe or the Faroes), derive from the Old Norse Færeyjar. The second element oyar ('islands') is a holdover from Old Faroese; sound changes have rendered the word's modern form as oyggjar. Names for individual islands (such as Kalsoy and Suðuroy) also preserve the old form.

The name's etymological origin has been subject to dispute. The most widely held theory, first attested in Færeyinga Saga, interprets Færeyjar as a straightforward compound of fær ('sheep') and eyjar ('islands'), meaning 'sheep islands' in reference to their abundance on the archipelago. Clergymen Peder Clausson and Lucas Debes began casting doubt on this theory in the 16th and 17th centuries, arguing that the West Norse-speaking settlers, whose word for sheep was sauðr instead of the East Norse fær, could not have coined it from this exact origin. Debes surmised that it could have derived from fjær ('far'), while Hammershaimb leaned towards fara ('to go', 'to travel').

Others have theorised an Old Irish origin: relating it to the etymologies of neighbouring Orkney and Shetland, Scottish writers James Currie and William J. Watson suggested the words feur ('pasture', 'eaten-up outfield') and fearann ('land', 'territory') as possible derivations, arguing that the original Celtic attestations of the islands made this more likely. Archaeologist Anton Wilhelm Brøgger concurred, elaborating on Watson's theory by positing that the Norse, having first learned of the islands from Scottish and Irish accounts as a fearann, could have coined Færeyjar as a homophonic translation.

== History ==
Archaeological studies from 2021 found evidence of settlement on the islands before the arrival of Norse settlers, uncovering burnt grains of domesticated barley and peat ash deposited in two phases: the first dated between the mid-fourth and mid-sixth centuries, and another between the late-sixth and late-eighth centuries. Researchers have also found sheep DNA in lake-bed sediments dating to the year 500. Barley and sheep had to have been brought to the islands by humans; as Scandinavians did not begin using sails until about 750, it is unlikely they could have reached the Faroes before then, leading to the study concluding that the settlers were more likely to originate from Scotland or Ireland.

Irish monk Dicuil described a group of islands north of Scotland of very similar character to the Faroe Islands in his work De mensura orbis terrae. In this text, Dicuil describes a group of small islands separated by narrow stretches of water that was always deserted since the beginning of time and previously populated by "hermits from our land of Ireland/Scotland" for almost a hundred years before being displaced by the arrival of Norse pirates.

There are many other islands in the ocean to the north of Britain which can be reached from the northern islands of Britain in a direct voyage of two days and nights with sails filled with a continuously favourable wind. A devout priest told me that in two summer days and the intervening night he sailed in a two-benched boat and entered one of them. There is another set of small islands, nearly all separated by narrow stretches of water; in these for nearly a hundred years hermits sailing from our country, Ireland, have lived. But just as they were always deserted from the beginning of the world, so now because of the Northman pirates they are emptied of anchorites, and filled with countless sheep and very many diverse kinds of sea-birds. I have never found these islands mentioned in the authorities.

It has been argued that these were likely the eremitic Papar that had similarly resided in parts of Iceland and Scotland in the same period, with these Papar also being the ones to bring sheep to the islands. A voyage tale, recorded in the ninth-century, concerning Irish saint Brendan, who proceeded Dicuil by 3 centuries, details him visiting an unnamed northern group of islands; this has also been argued to be referring to the Faroe Islands, though not nearly as conclusively. Some toponyms around the islands refer to the Papar and the Irish, such as Paparøkur near Vestmanna and Papurshílsur near Saksun. Vestmanna is itself short for Vestmannahøvn ('harbour of the Westmen'). Tombstones in a churchyard on Skúvoy display a possible Gaelic origin or influence.

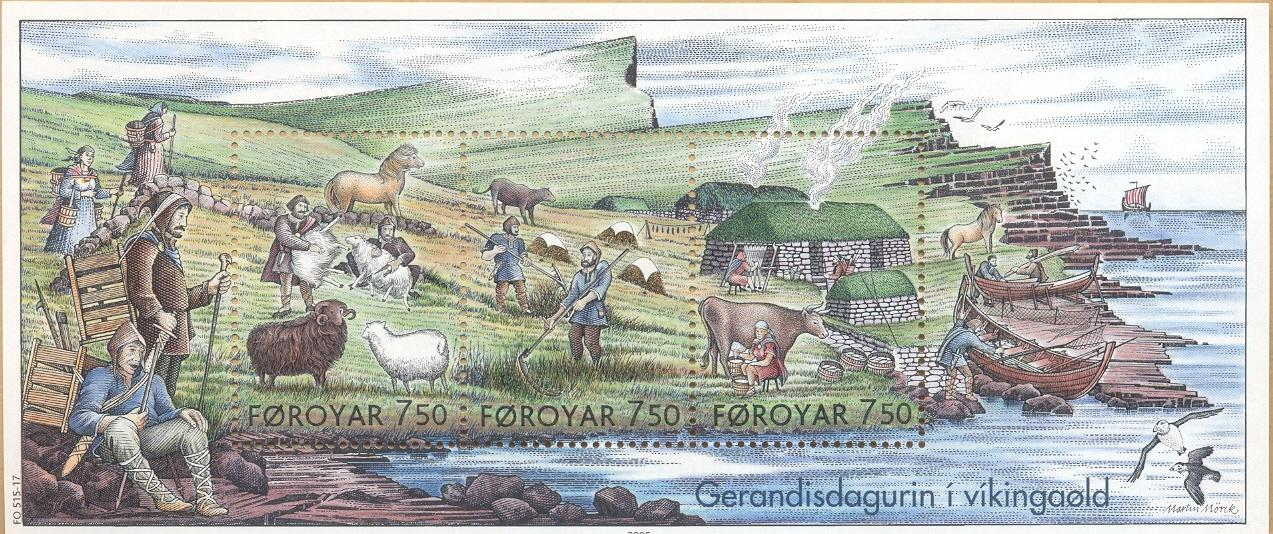
Everyday life in the Viking Age

Old Norse-speaking settlers arrived in the early 9th century, and their Old West Norse dialect would later evolve into the modern Faroese language. A number of the settlers were Norse–Gaels who did not come directly from Scandinavia, but rather from Norse communities that spanned the Irish Sea, Northern Isles, and Outer Hebrides of Scotland, including the Shetland and Orkney islands; these settlers also brought thralls of Gaelic origin with them, and this admixture is reflected today in the Faroese genetic makeup and many loanwords from Old Irish. According to Færeyinga saga, many of the Norwegian settlers in particular were spurred by their disapproval of the monarchy of Harald Fairhair, whose rule was also seen as an inciting factor for the Settlement of Iceland.

The founding date of the Løgting is not historically documented. However, the saga implies that it was a well-established institution by the middle of the 10th century, when a legal dispute between chieftains Havgrímur and Einar Suðuroyingur, resulting in the exile of Eldjárn Kambhøttur, is recounted in detail.

Christianity was introduced to the islands in the late 10th and early 11th centuries by chieftain Sigmundur Brestisson. Baptised as an adult by then-King of Norway Olaf Tryggvason, his mission to introduce Christianity was part of a greater plan to seize the islands on behalf of the Norwegian crown. While Christianity arrived at the same time as in Iceland, the process was met with much more conflict and violence, and was defined particularly by Sigmundur's conflict with rival chieftain Tróndur í Gøtu, the latter of whom was converted under threat of decapitation. Although their conflict resulted in Sigmundur's murder, the Islands fell firmly under Norwegian rule following Tróndur's death in 1035.

=== 14th century onwards ===
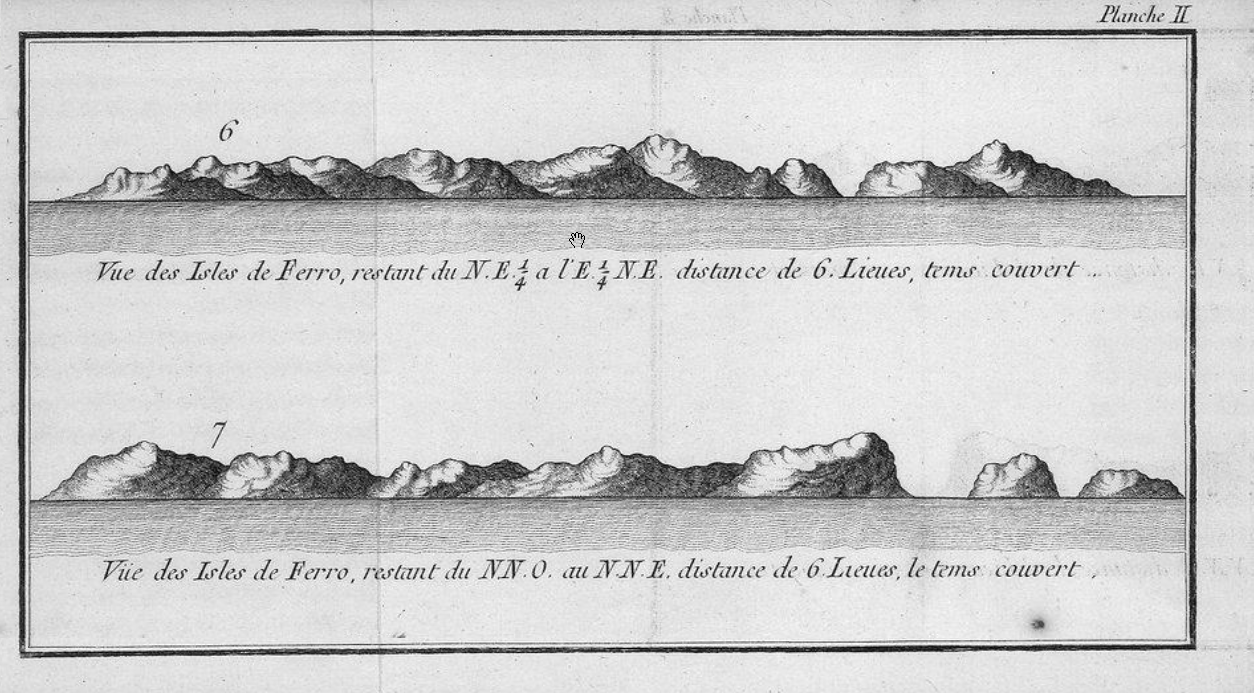
The Faroe Islands as seen by the Breton navigator Yves-Joseph de Kerguelen-Trémarec in 1767

In 1380, the Faroe Islands entered a union with Denmark through the unification of Denmark and Norway, marking the beginning of a prolonged period under Danish influence. This transition led to significant changes, including the introduction of Lutheranism in 1538, which had profound effects on the islands' religious practices and cultural identity.

The Faroe Islands were subjected to repeated slave raids by the Barbary corsairs between the 16th and 18th centuries. The most famous slave raid on the Faroe Islands was the slave raid of Suðuroy in the summer of 1629.

The 17th century brought economic challenges as Denmark imposed a trade monopoly, restricting the Faroese economy and limiting their commercial interactions with other nations. This monopoly was eventually lifted in 1856, allowing the islands to develop a modern fishing industry and revitalise their economy.

The 19th century was a pivotal era for Faroese cultural and political revival. Lutheran minister Venceslaus Ulricus Hammershaimb introduced an official orthography for the Faroese language in 1846, reaffirming its cultural significance after centuries of suppression. This linguistic renaissance fuelled the growth of a national movement, leading to the reinstatement of the Løgting in 1852 as an advisory body.

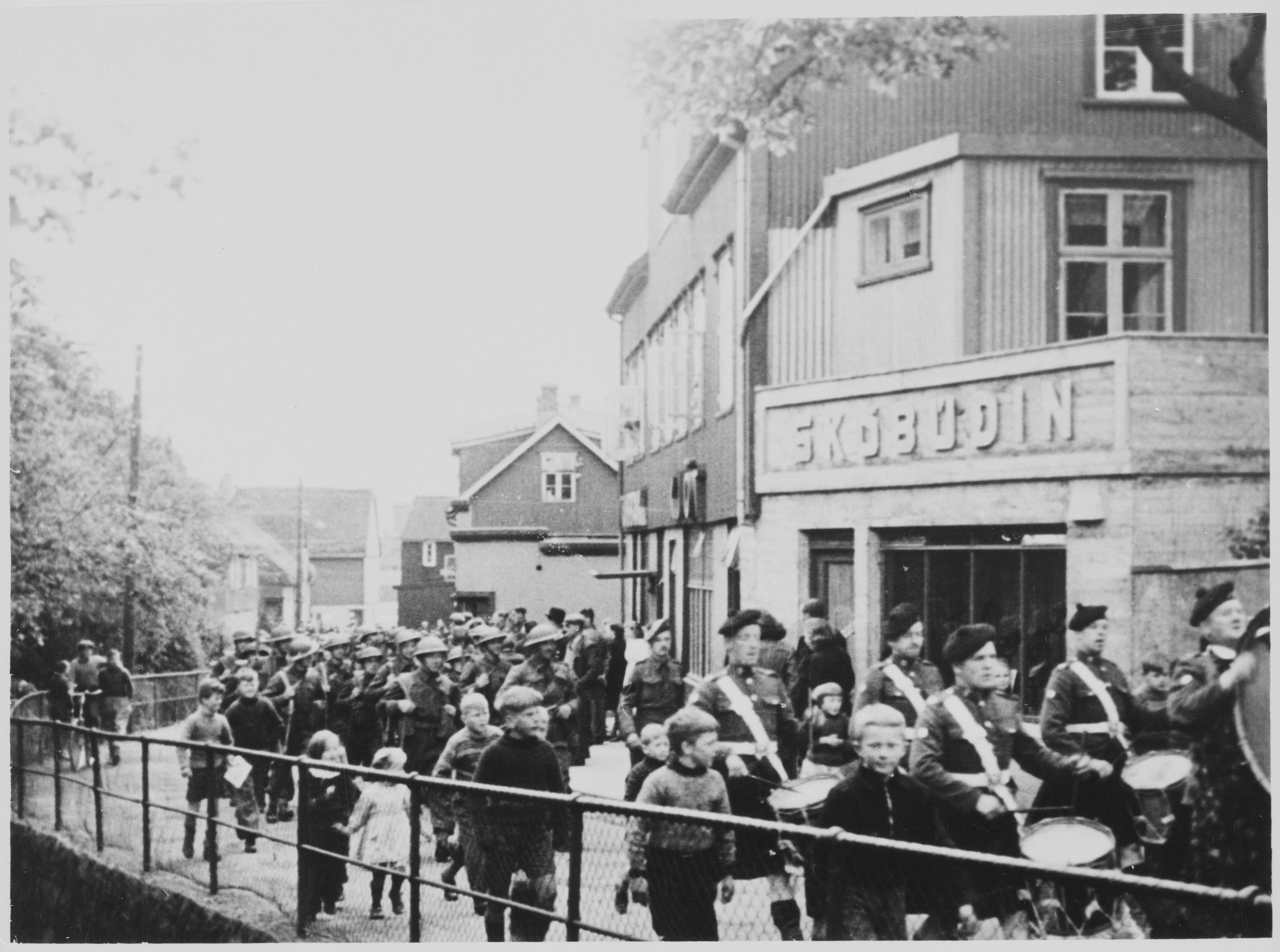
British troops arrive in Tórshavn, 1940

The early 20th century saw the emergence of political parties advocating for greater autonomy. The Union Party favoured maintaining ties with Denmark, while the Self-Government Party pushed for full independence.

In the first year of the Second World War, on 12 April 1940, British troops occupied the Faroe Islands in Operation Valentine. Nazi Germany had invaded Denmark and commenced the invasion of Norway on 9 April 1940 under Operation Weserübung. In 1942–1943, the British Royal Engineers, under the command of Lieutenant Colonel William Law, built the first and only airport in the Faroe Islands, Vágar Airport. The British refrained from governing Faroese internal affairs, and the islands became effectively self-governing during the war. After the war ended and the British army left, this period and Iceland's declaration as a republic in 1944 served as a precedent and a model in the mind of many Faroe Islanders.

Independence debates culminated in a 1946 referendum where a slim majority voted for independence; however, the Danish government annulled the results, and the islands remained under Danish sovereignty. The Løgting held an independence referendum on 14 September 1946, resulting in a very narrow majority for independence; 50.73% voted in favour and 49.27% against; the margin was only 161 votes. The Løgting subsequently declared independence on 18 September 1946; this declaration was annulled by Denmark on 20 September, arguing that the number of invalid votes (481) being greater than the narrow margin in favour made the result invalid. As a result, King Christian X of Denmark ordered that the Faroese Løgting be dissolved on 24 September, with new elections held that November. The Faroese parliamentary election of 1946 resulted in a majority for parties opposed to independence: following protracted negotiations, Denmark granted home rule to the Faroe Islands on 30 March 1948. This agreement granted the islands a high degree of autonomy, and Faroese finally became the official language in all public spheres.

In 1973, the Faroe Islands declined to join Denmark in entering the European Economic Community (EEC); as a result, the islands are not part of the European Union (EU) today (although, as Danish citizens, Faroe Islanders are still considered EU citizens). Following the collapse of the fishing industry in the early 1990s, the Faroes experienced considerable economic difficulties.

Today, the Faroe Islands are a self-governing territory within the Kingdom of Denmark, proud of their cultural heritage, fishing industry, and political autonomy.

== Geography ==
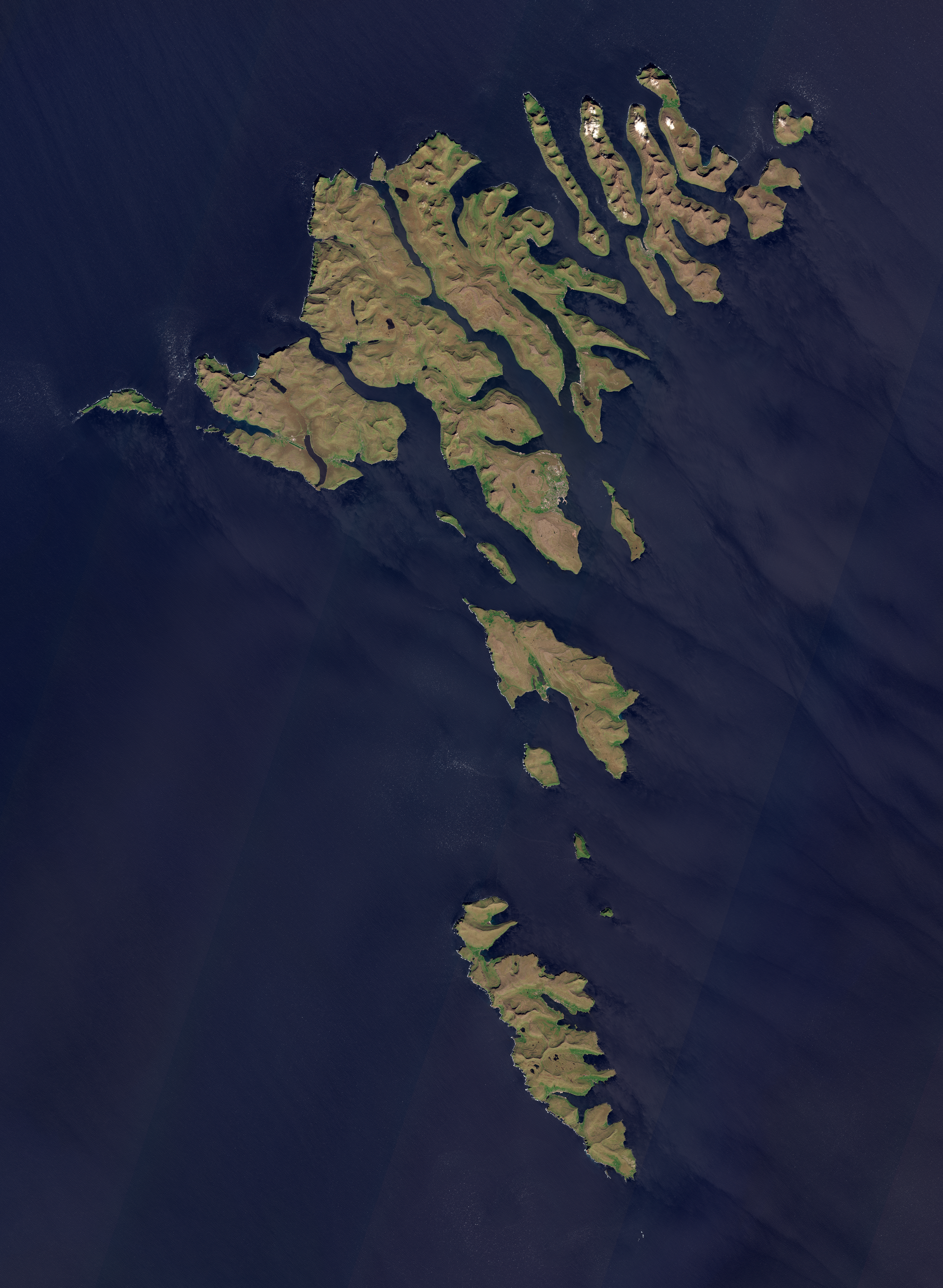
Satellite image of the Faroe Islands

The Faroe Islands are an island group consisting of 18 major islands (and a total of 779 islands, islets, and skerries) about 655 kilometres (407 mi) off the coast of Northern Europe, between the Norwegian Sea and the North Atlantic Ocean, about halfway between Iceland and Norway, the closest neighbours being the Northern Isles and the Outer Hebrides of the United Kingdom. Its coordinates are 62°00′N 06°47′W.

Distance from the Faroe Islands to:

- Rona (uninhabited), United Kingdom: 260 kilometres (160 mi)
- Shetland (Foula), United Kingdom: 285 kilometres (177 mi)
- Orkney (Westray), United Kingdom: 300 kilometres (190 mi)
- United Kingdom (mainland): 320 kilometres (200 mi)
- Iceland: 450 kilometres (280 mi)
- Norway: 580 kilometres (360 mi)
- Ireland: 670 kilometres (420 mi)
- Denmark: 990 kilometres (620 mi)

The islands cover an area of 1,399 square kilometres (540 sq. mi) and have small lakes and rivers, but no major ones. There are 1,117 kilometres (694 mi) of coastline. The only significant uninhabited island is Lítla Dímun.

The islands are rugged and rocky with some low peaks; the coasts are mostly cliffs. The highest point is Slættaratindur in northern Eysturoy, 882 metres (2,894 ft) above sea level.

The Faroe Islands are made up of an approximately six-kilometres-thick succession of mostly basaltic lava that was part of the great North Atlantic Igneous Province during the Paleogene period. The lavas erupted during the opening of the North Atlantic Ocean, which began about 60 million years ago, and what is today the Faroe Islands was then attached to Greenland. The lavas are underlain by circa 30 km of unidentified ancient continental crust.

=== Climate ===
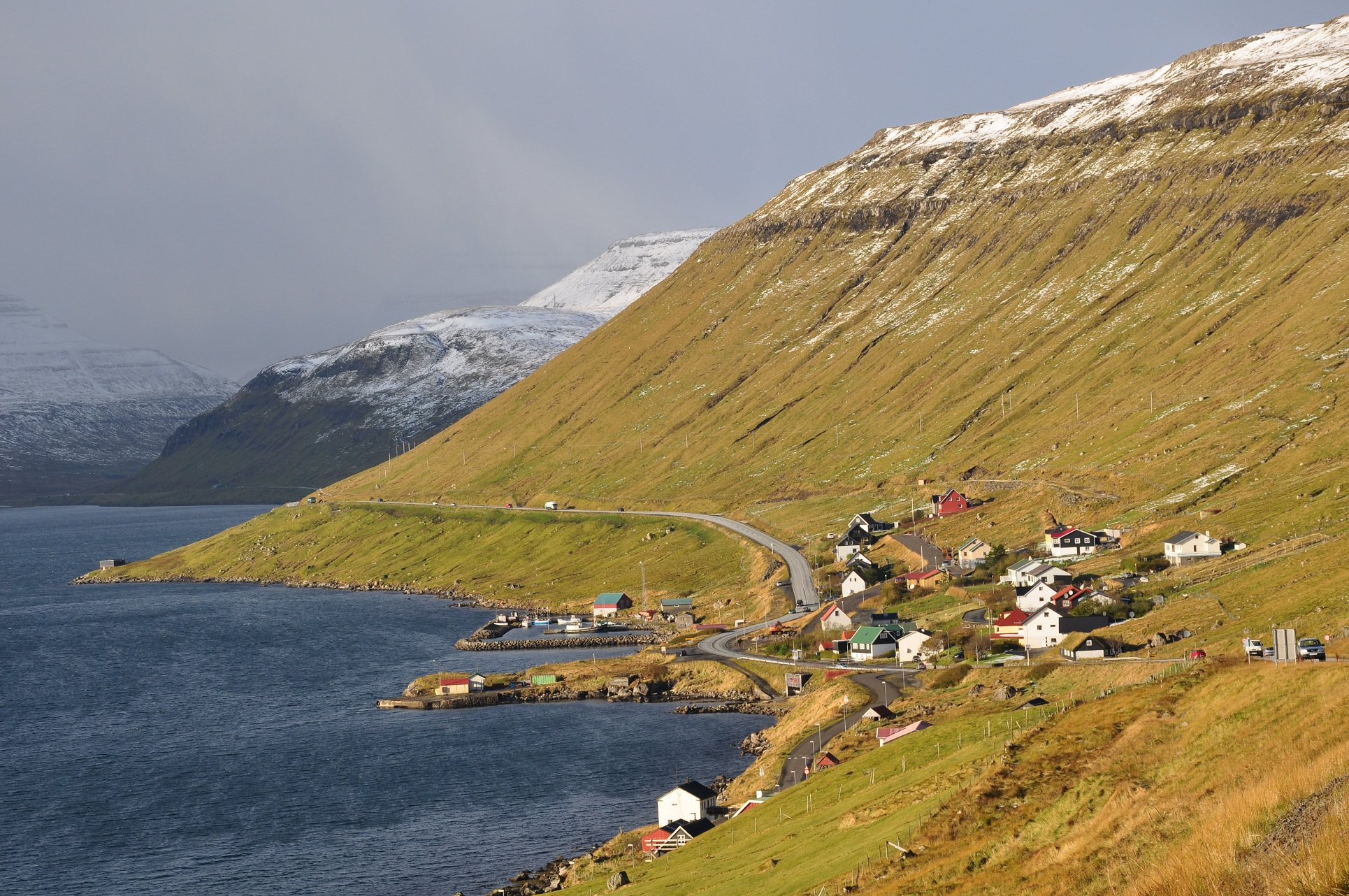
The village of Skipanes on Eysturoy, with murkier weather in the distance

The climate is classed as subpolar oceanic climate according to the Köppen climate classification: Cfc, with areas having a tundra climate, especially in the mountains, although some coastal or low-lying areas may have very mild-winter versions of a tundra climate. The overall character of the climate of the islands is influenced by the strong warming influence of the Atlantic Ocean, which produces the North Atlantic Current. This, together with the remoteness of any source of landmass-induced warm or cold airflows, ensures that winters are mild (mean temperature 3.0 to 4.0 °C or 37 to 39 °F) while summers are cool (mean temperature 9.5 to 11.2 °C or 49 to 52 °F).

The islands are windy, cloudy, and cool throughout the year, with an average of 210 rainy or snowy days per year. The islands lie in the path of depressions moving northeast, making strong winds and heavy rain possible at all times of the year. Sunny days are rare, and overcast days are common. Hurricane Faith struck the Faroe Islands on 5 September 1966 with sustained winds over 100 mph (160 km/h), and only then did the storm cease to be a tropical system.

The climate varies greatly over small distances due to the altitude, ocean currents, topography, and winds. Precipitation varies considerably throughout the archipelago. In some highland areas, snow cover may last for months, with snowfalls possible for the greater part of the year (on the highest peaks, summer snowfall is by no means rare), while in some sheltered coastal locations, several years pass without any snowfall whatsoever. Tórshavn receives frosts more often than other areas just a short distance to the south. Snow is also seen at a much higher frequency than on outlying islands nearby. The area receives on average 49 frosts a year.

The collection of meteorological data on the Faroe Islands began in 1867. Winter recording began in 1891, and the warmest winter occurred in 2016–17 with an average temperature of 6.1 °C (43 °F).

Climate data for Tórshavn (1981–2010 normals, extremes 1961–2010)
Month	Jan	Feb	Mar	Apr	May	Jun	Jul	Aug	Sep	Oct	Nov	Dec	Year
Record high °C (°F)	11.6 (52.9)	12.0 (53.6)	12.3 (54.1)	18.3 (64.9)	19.7 (67.5)	20.0 (68.0)	20.2 (68.4)	22.0 (71.6)	19.5 (67.1)	15.2 (59.4)	14.7 (58.5)	13.2 (55.8)	22.0 (71.6)
Mean daily maximum °C (°F)	5.8 (42.4)	5.6 (42.1)	6.0 (42.8)	7.3 (45.1)	9.2 (48.6)	11.1 (52.0)	12.8 (55.0)	13.1 (55.6)	11.5 (52.7)	9.3 (48.7)	7.2 (45.0)	6.2 (43.2)	8.8 (47.8)
Daily mean °C (°F)	4.0 (39.2)	3.6 (38.5)	4.0 (39.2)	5.2 (41.4)	7.0 (44.6)	9.0 (48.2)	10.7 (51.3)	11.0 (51.8)	9.6 (49.3)	7.5 (45.5)	5.5 (41.9)	4.3 (39.7)	6.8 (44.2)
Mean daily minimum °C (°F)	1.7 (35.1)	1.3 (34.3)	1.7 (35.1)	3.0 (37.4)	5.1 (41.2)	7.1 (44.8)	9.0 (48.2)	9.2 (48.6)	7.6 (45.7)	5.4 (41.7)	3.4 (38.1)	2.1 (35.8)	4.7 (40.5)
Record low °C (°F)	−8.8 (16.2)	−11.0 (12.2)	−9.2 (15.4)	−9.9 (14.2)	−3.0 (26.6)	0.0 (32.0)	1.5 (34.7)	1.5 (34.7)	−0.6 (30.9)	−4.5 (23.9)	−7.2 (19.0)	−10.5 (13.1)	−11.0 (12.2)
Average precipitation mm (inches)	157.7 (6.21)	115.2 (4.54)	131.6 (5.18)	89.5 (3.52)	63.3 (2.49)	57.5 (2.26)	74.3 (2.93)	96.0 (3.78)	119.5 (4.70)	147.4 (5.80)	139.3 (5.48)	135.3 (5.33)	1,321.3 (52.02)
Average precipitation days (≥ 0.1 mm)	26	23	26	22	19	18	19	20	23	26	26	27	273
Average snowy days	8.3	6.6	8.0	4.4	1.5	0.0	0.0	0.0	0.1	1.4	5.5	8.2	44.0
Average relative humidity (%)	89	88	88	87	87	88	89	90	89	89	88	89	88
Mean monthly sunshine hours	14.5	36.7	72.8	108.6	137.8	128.6	103.6	100.9	82.7	53.4	21.1	7.8	868.2
Source: Danish Meteorological Institute (humidity 1961–1990, precipitation days 1961–1990, snowy days 1961–1990)

=== Flora ===
Marsh marigold (Caltha palustris) is common in the Faroe Islands during May and June.

The Faroes belong to the Faroe Islands boreal grasslands ecoregion. The natural vegetation of the Faroe Islands is dominated by arctic-alpine plants, wildflowers, grasses, moss, and lichen. Most of the lowland area is grassland, and some are heath, dominated by shrubby heathers, mainly Calluna vulgaris. Among the herbaceous flora that occurs in the Faroe Islands is the cosmopolitan marsh thistle, Cirsium palustre.

Although it is often asserted that the islands are naturally treeless, several tree species, among them shrubby willows (salix), junipers (Juniperus), and stunted birches, colonised the island after the Ice Age but disappeared later – apparently as a result of grazing impacts, possibly aggravated by a shift to relatively wetter cooler climatic conditions about the same time. A limited number of species have been successfully introduced to the region, in particular, trees from the Magellanic subpolar forests region of Chile. Conditions in the Magellanic subpolar forests are similar to those in the Faroe Islands, with cold summers and near-continuous subpolar winds. The following species from Tierra del Fuego, Drimys winteri, Nothofagus antarctica, Nothofagus pumilio, and Nothofagus betuloides, have been successfully introduced to the Faroe Islands. A non-Chilean species that has been introduced is the black cottonwood, also known as the California poplar (Populus trichocarpa).

=== Fauna ===
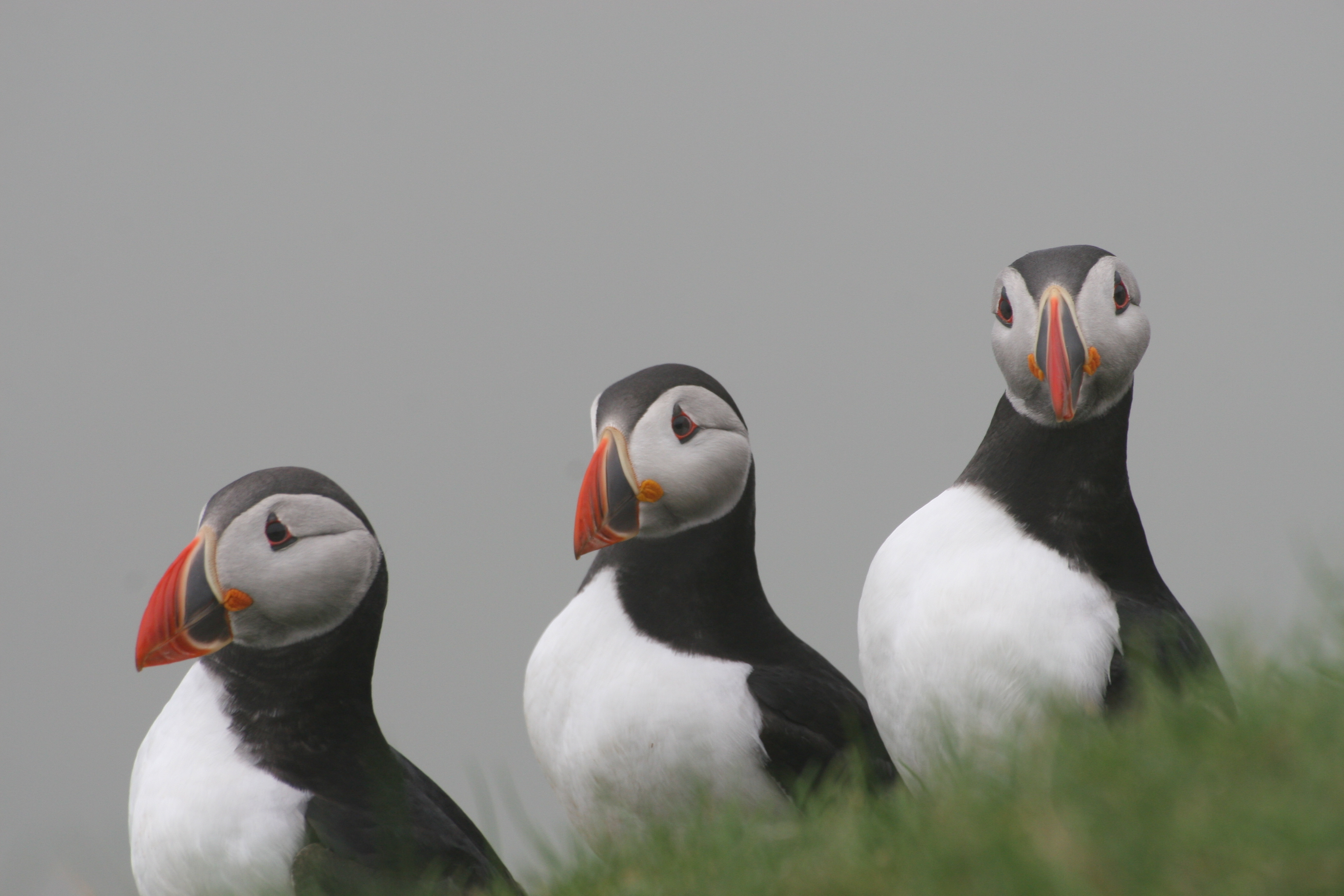
Atlantic puffins are very common and a part of the local cuisine: Faroese puffin.

The bird fauna of the Faroe Islands is dominated by seabirds and birds attracted to open land such as heather, probably because of the lack of woodland and other suitable habitats. Many species have developed special Faroese sub-species such as the common eider, common starling, Eurasian wren, and black guillemot. The pied raven, a colour morph of the North Atlantic subspecies of the common raven, was endemic to the Faroe Islands, but now has become extinct; the ordinary, all-black morph remains fairly widespread in the archipelago.

Only a few species of wild land mammals are found in the Faroe Islands today, all introduced by humans. Three species are thriving on the islands today: mountain hare (Lepus timidus), brown rat (Rattus norvegicus), and the house mouse (Mus musculus). Recent DNA studies have reveal three independent introductions of the brown rat to the Faroe Islands

The domestic animals of the Faroe Islands are a result of 1,200 years of isolated breeding. As a result, many of the islands' domestic animals are found nowhere else in the world. Faroese domestic breeds include Faroe pony, Faroe cow, Faroe sheep, Faroese goose, and Faroese duck. The Faroe sheep is depicted on the coat of arms; there once was a variety of feral sheep, which survived on Lítla Dímun until the mid-nineteenth century.

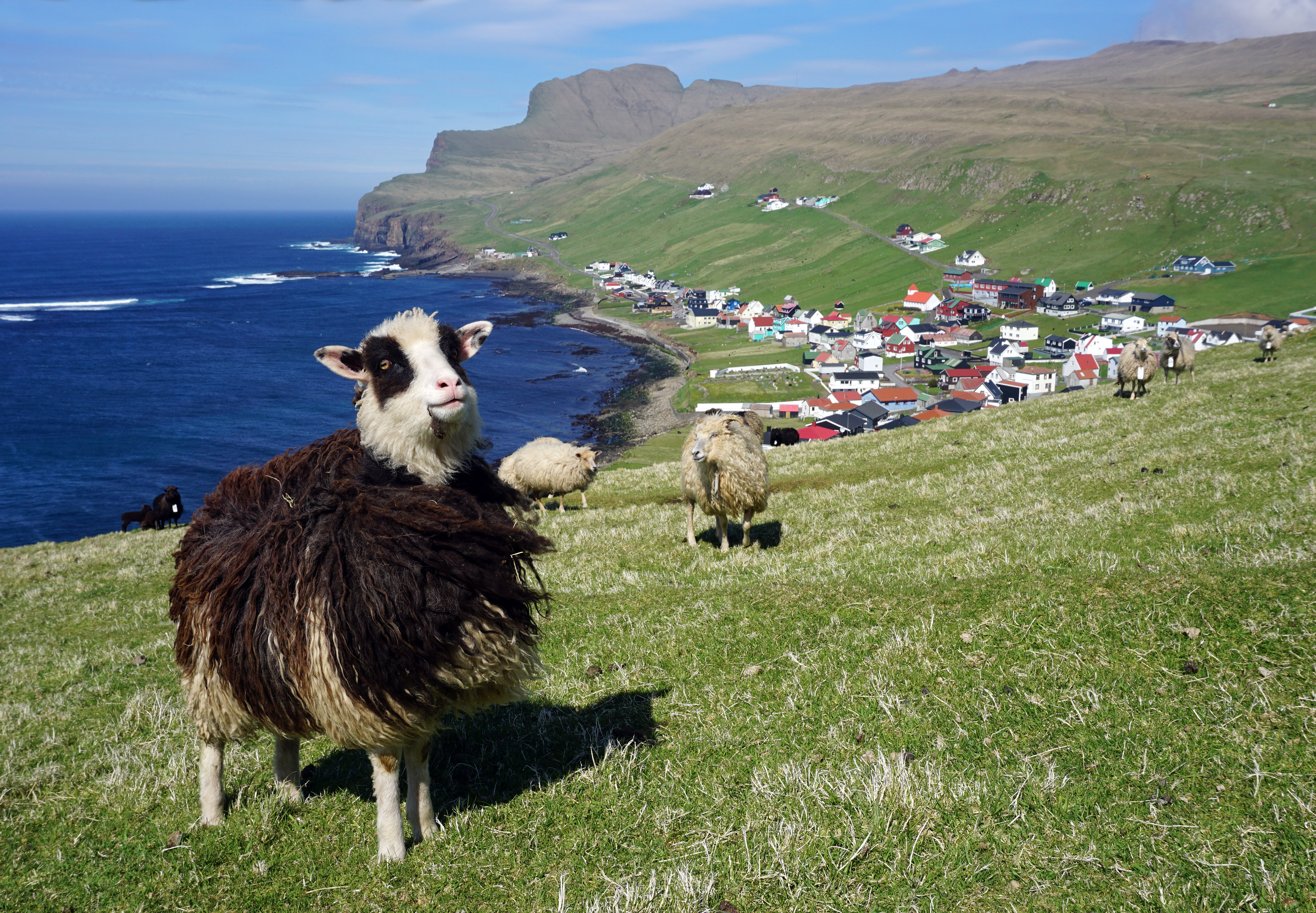
Faroe sheep with the town of Sumba in the background

Grey seals (Halichoerus grypus) are common around the shorelines, away from human habitations. Several species of cetacea live in the waters around the Faroe Islands. Best known are the long-finned pilot whales (Globicephala melaena), which still are hunted by the islanders under longstanding local tradition (see Whaling, below). Orcas (Orcinus orca) are regular visitors around the islands.

=== Geology ===
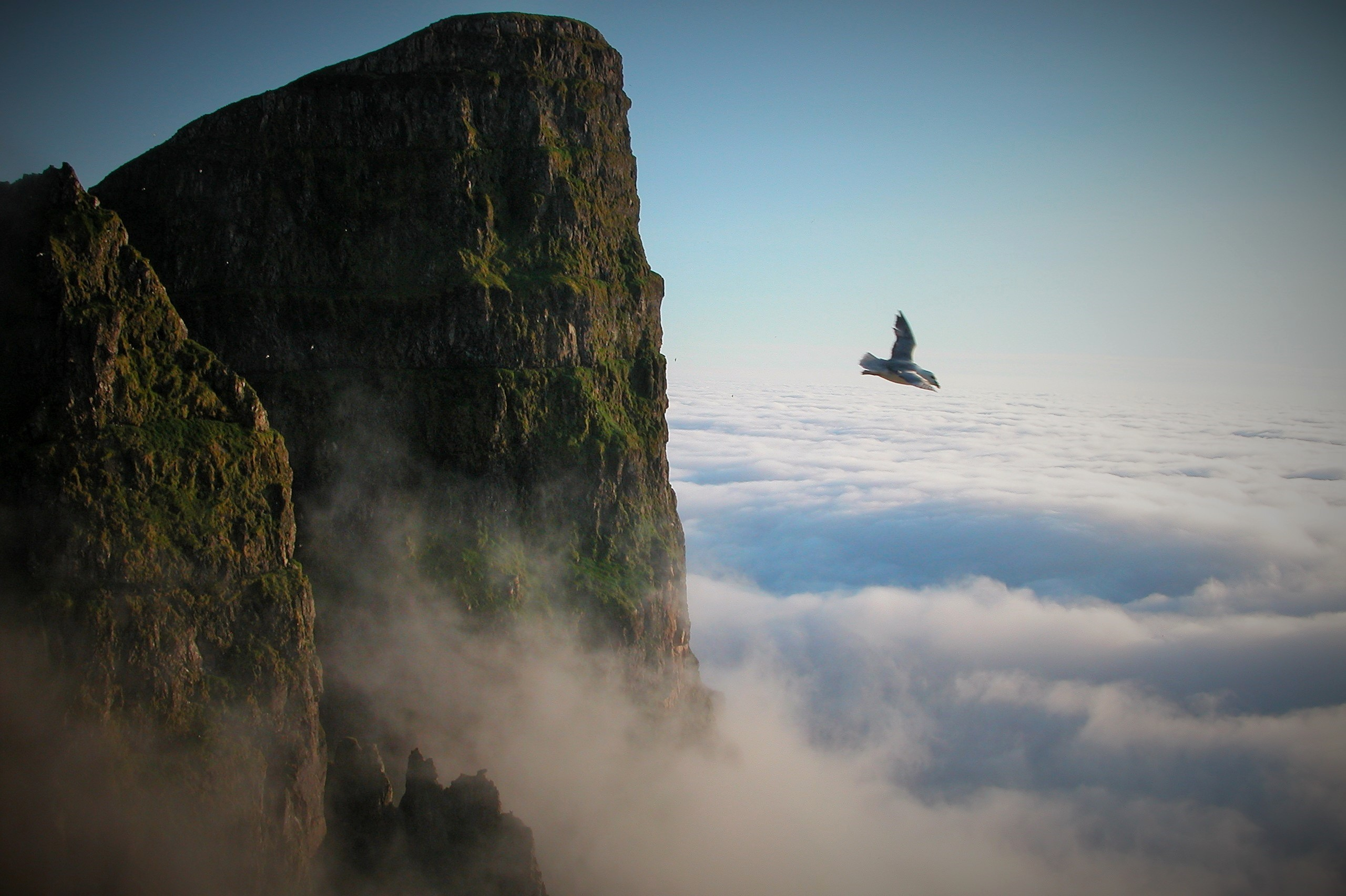
Beinisvørð, on the west coast of Suðuroy

The islands were formed during a period of high volcanic activity in the Early Paleogene, around 50–60 million years ago. The islands are built up in layers of different lava flows (basalt) alternating with thin layers of volcanic ash (tuff). The soft ash and the hard basalt thus lie layer upon layer in narrow and thick strips. The soft tuff or ash zones erode relatively quickly, and the hard lump of basalt above the eroded tuff falls away, forming the first terrace.

Volcanic activity has varied over millions of years, with periods of quiescence and various periods of quiet eruptive fissures and explosive volcanism. In a few places, mainly on Suðuroy, thin layers of coal are present, which are the remains of swamp forests from the time between volcanic eruptions. The plateau has, therefore, been divided into different basalt series according to the course of volcanism and the age sequence of the layers.

There are major differences in the shapes of the islands' terraces. The lowest and oldest series are thick lava deposits that can be seen on the southern part of Suðuroy, Mykines, Tindhólmur, and the western side of Vágar. The basalts of the lower basalt series are often pillared, which is shown by elongated, angular, and regular pillars in the mountainside. Very regular vertical columns are found on northern Mykines, where they can be up to 30 metres (100 ft) high.

The middle basalt series consists of thin lava flows with a highly porous interlayer. This series has very little resistance to crumbling and weathering. As these erosion processes are more severe at higher altitudes than lower down, the lowlands are filled with weathering material from the heights, often resulting in a characteristic curved landscape shape. This can be seen in Vágar, the northernmost part of Streymoy, and the northwestern part of Eysturoy.

Glacial activity has reduced plateau surfaces, especially on the northern islands, where the surfaces have been reduced to a series of narrower or wider zig-zag rows along the length of the islands: especially on the islands of Kunoy, Kalsoy, and Borðoy, where an eastward and a westward ice mass have eroded the intervening mountain range into a narrow ridge.

=== Topography ===
The Faroe Islands have a predominantly mountainous terrain, with elevations rising steeply from the coastline on most islands. The landscape features a series of basaltic plateaus intersected by valleys and fjords, resulting in numerous summits across the archipelago. The highest elevations are located on the larger northern islands, particularly Eysturoy, Viðoy and Kunoy.

The five highest mountain peaks in the Faroe Islands are:

1. Slættaratindur (Eysturoy) – 880 m
2. Gráfelli (Eysturoy) – 856 m
3. Villingadalsfjall (Viðoy) – 841 m
4. Kúvingafjall (Kunoy) – 830 m
5. Teigafjall (Kunoy) – 825 m

See more at Wikipedia page: List of mountains of the Faroe Islands

== Government and politics ==
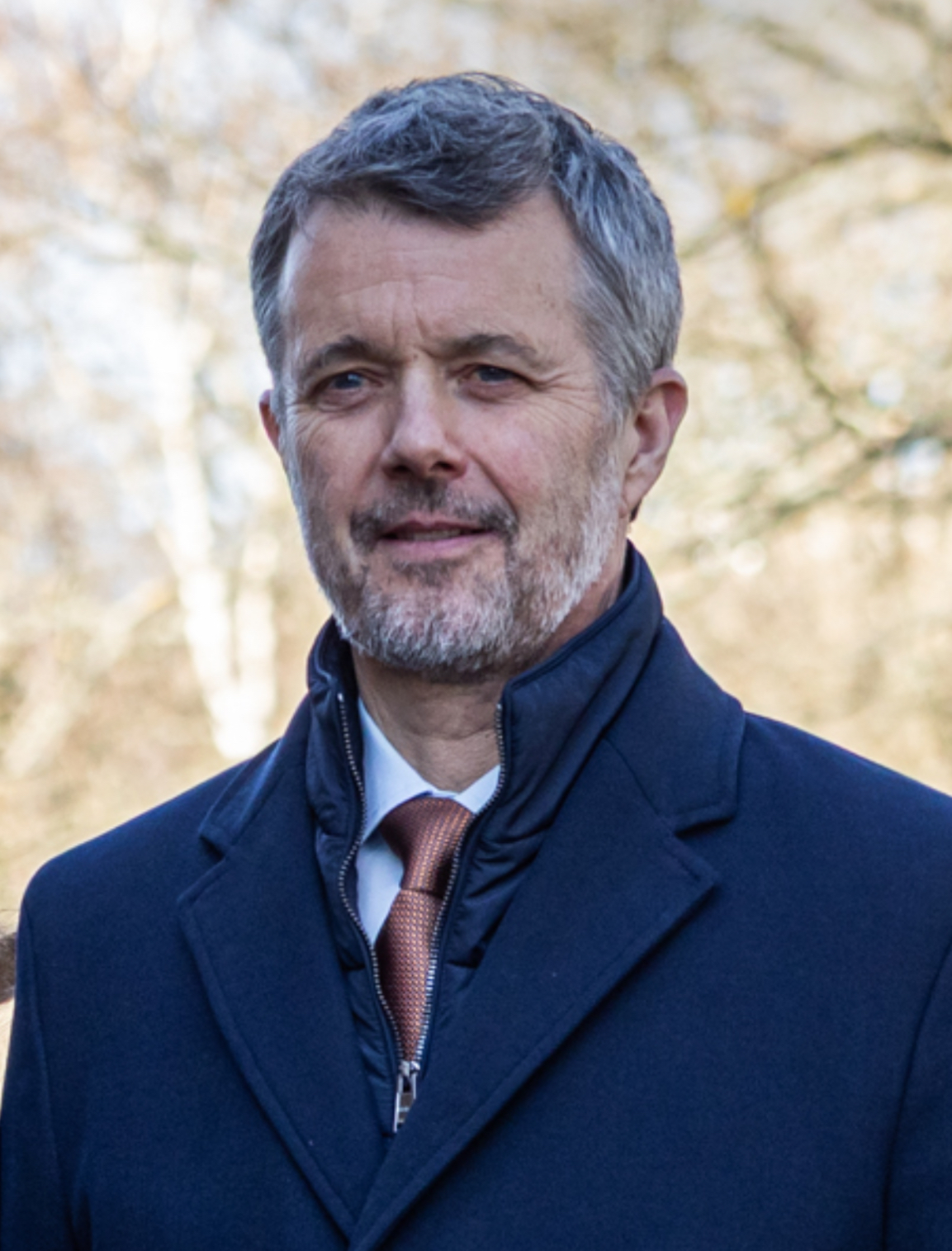
Frederik X,
King of Denmark since 2024

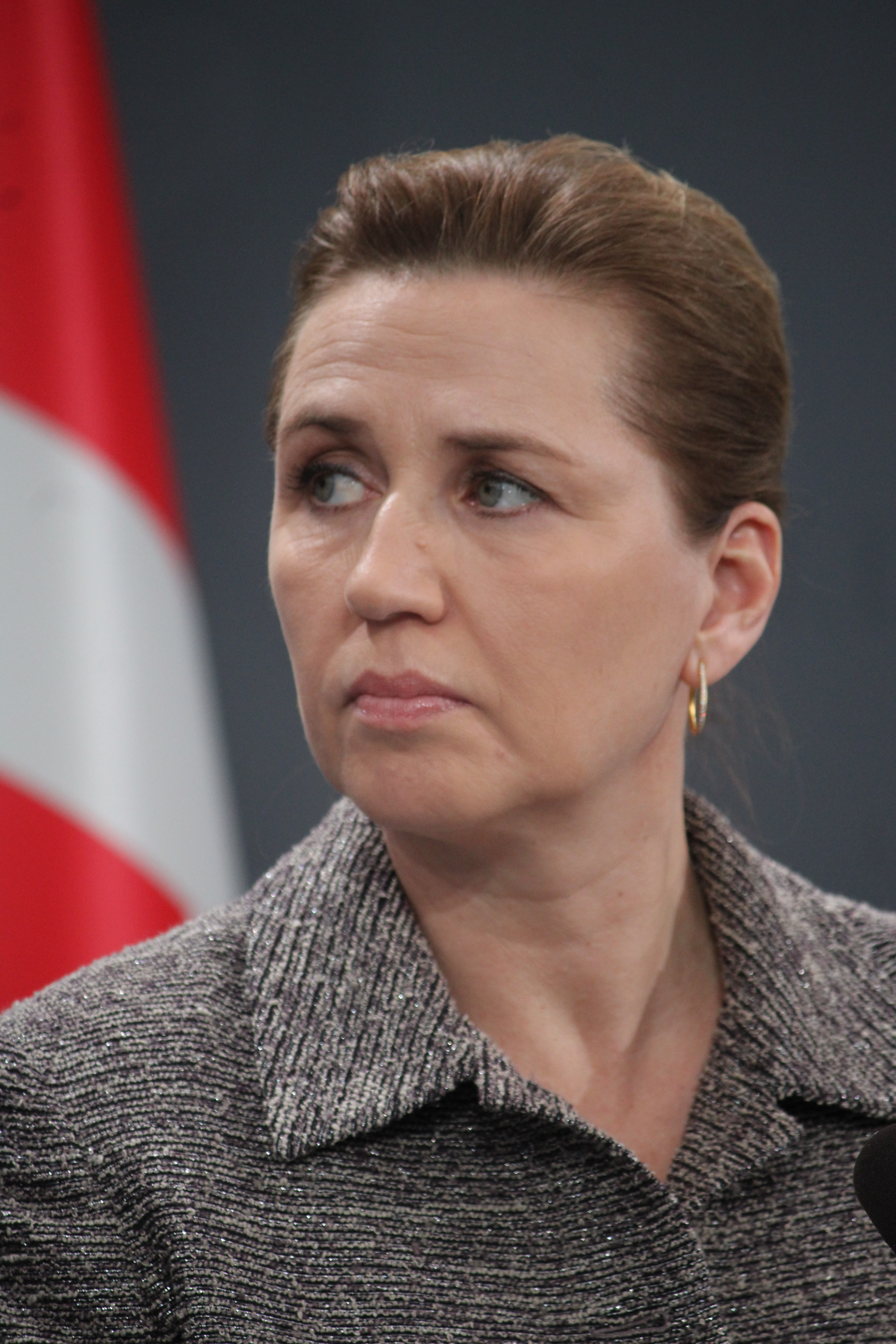
Mette Frederiksen,
Danish Prime Minister since 2019

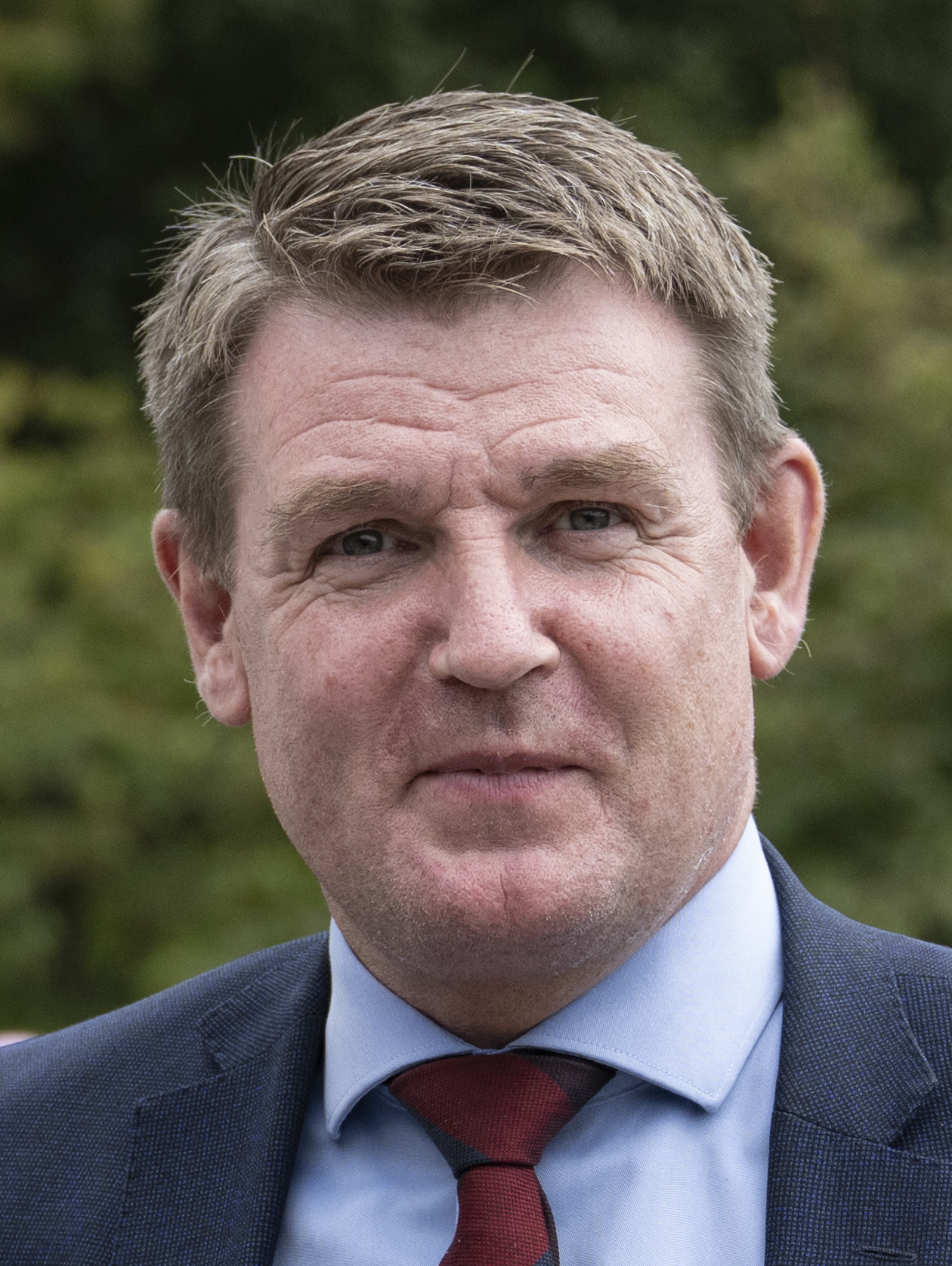
Aksel V. Johannesen,
Faroese Prime Minister since 2022

The Faroe Islands are a self-governing country under the external sovereignty of the Kingdom of Denmark. The Faroese government holds executive power in local government affairs. The head of the government is called the Løgmaður ("Chief Justice") and serves as Prime Minister and head of the Faroese Government. Any other member of the cabinet is called a Minister of the Faroese Government (landsstýrismaður/ráðharri if male, landsstýriskvinna/ráðfrú if female). The Faroese parliament – the Løgting ("Law Thing") – dates back to the early days of settlement and claims to be one of the longest functioning parliaments in the world, alongside the Icelandic Althing and the Manx Tynwald. The parliament currently has 33 members.

Tinganes in Tórshavn, seat of a part of the Faroese government

Elections are held at municipal and national levels, additionally electing two members (North Atlantic mandates) to the Folketing. Until 2007, there were seven electoral districts, which were abolished on 25 October of that year in favour of a single nationwide district.

=== Administrative divisions ===
Relief map of the Faroe Islands

Administratively, the islands are divided into 29 municipalities (kommunur) within which there are 120 or so settlements.

There are also the six traditional sýslur: Norðoyar, Eysturoy, Streymoy, Vágar, Sandoy, and Suðuroy. While no longer of any legal significance, the term is still commonly used to indicate a geographical region. In earlier times, each sýsla had its own assembly, the so-called várting ("spring assembly").

=== Relationship with Denmark ===
The Faroe Islands have been under Norwegian-Danish control since 1388. The 1814 Treaty of Kiel terminated the Danish–Norwegian union, and Norway came under the rule of the King of Sweden, while the Faroe Islands, Iceland, and Greenland remained Danish possessions. From ancient times the Faroe Islands had a parliament (Løgting), which was abolished in 1816, and the Faroe Islands were to be governed as an ordinary Danish amt (county), with the Amtmand as its head of government. In 1851, the Løgting was reinstated, but, until 1948, it served mainly as an advisory body.

The islands are home to an independence movement that has seen an increase in popular support within recent decades. At the end of World War II, some of the population favoured independence from Denmark, and on 14 September 1946, an independence referendum was held on the question of secession. It was a consultative referendum, the parliament not being bound to follow the people's vote. This was the first time that the Faroese people had been asked whether they favoured independence or wanted to continue within the Danish kingdom.

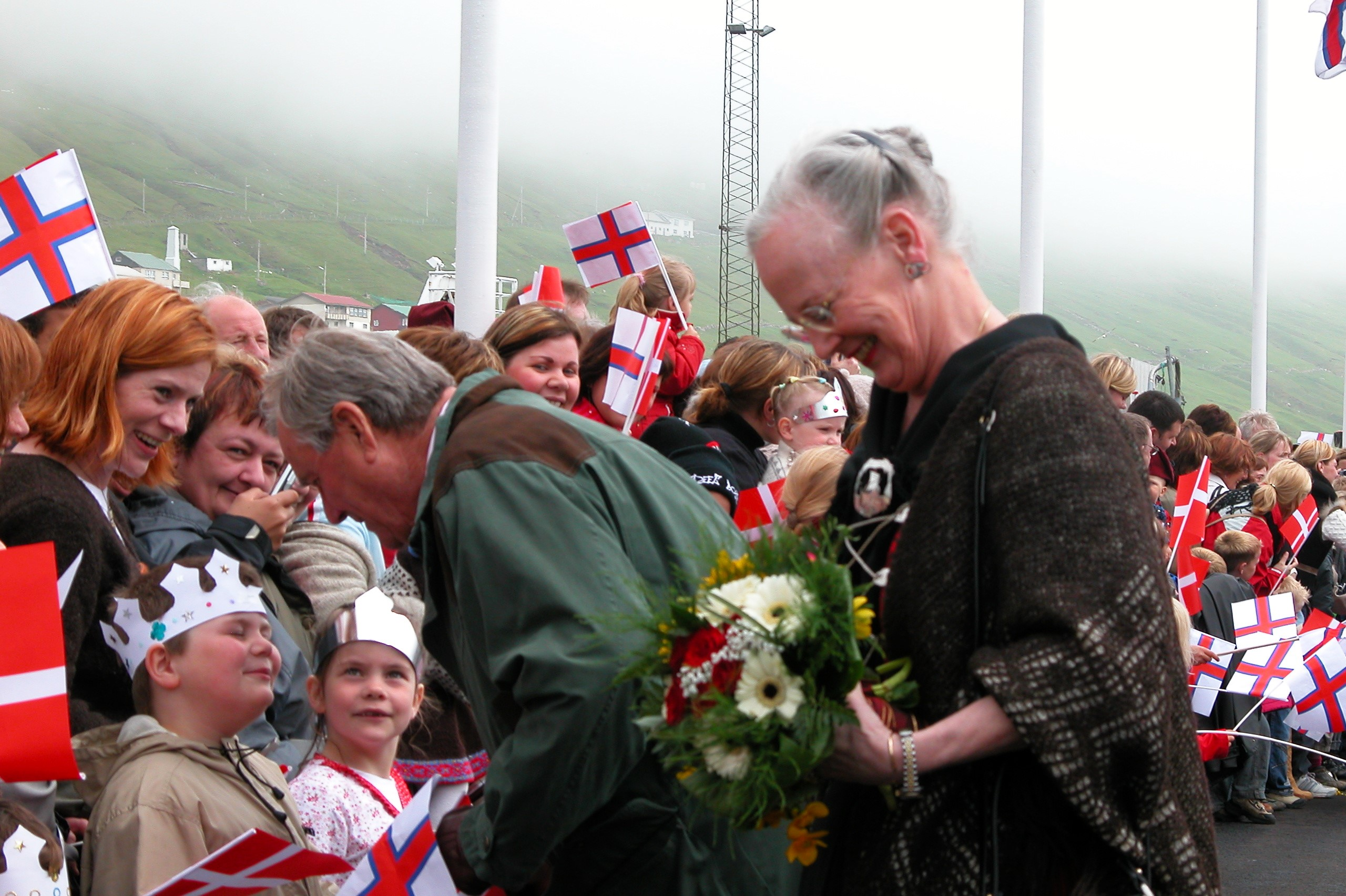
Queen Margrethe II during a visit to Vágur in 2005

The result of the vote was only a slight majority in favour of secession. The Speaker of the Løgting, together with the majority, initiated the process of becoming an independent state. The minority of the Løgting left in protest, regarding these actions as illegal. One parliament member, Jákup í Jákupsstovu, was shunned by his own party, the Social Democratic Party, for having joined the majority of the Løgting.

The Speaker of the Løgting declared the Faroe Islands independent on 18 September 1946.

On 25 September 1946, a Danish prefect announced to the Løgting that the king, rejecting the majority vote, had dissolved the parliament and ordered new elections.

A parliamentary election was held a few months later, in which the political parties that favoured remaining in the Danish kingdom increased their share of the vote and formed a coalition. Based on this, they chose to reject secession. Instead, a compromise was reached, and the Folketing passed a home-rule law that went into effect in 1948. The Faroe Islands' status as a Danish amt was thereby brought to an end; the Faroe Islands were given a high degree of self-governance, supported by a financial subsidy from Denmark to recompense expenses the islands have on Danish services.

In protest against the new Home Rule Act, Republic (Tjóðveldi) was founded.

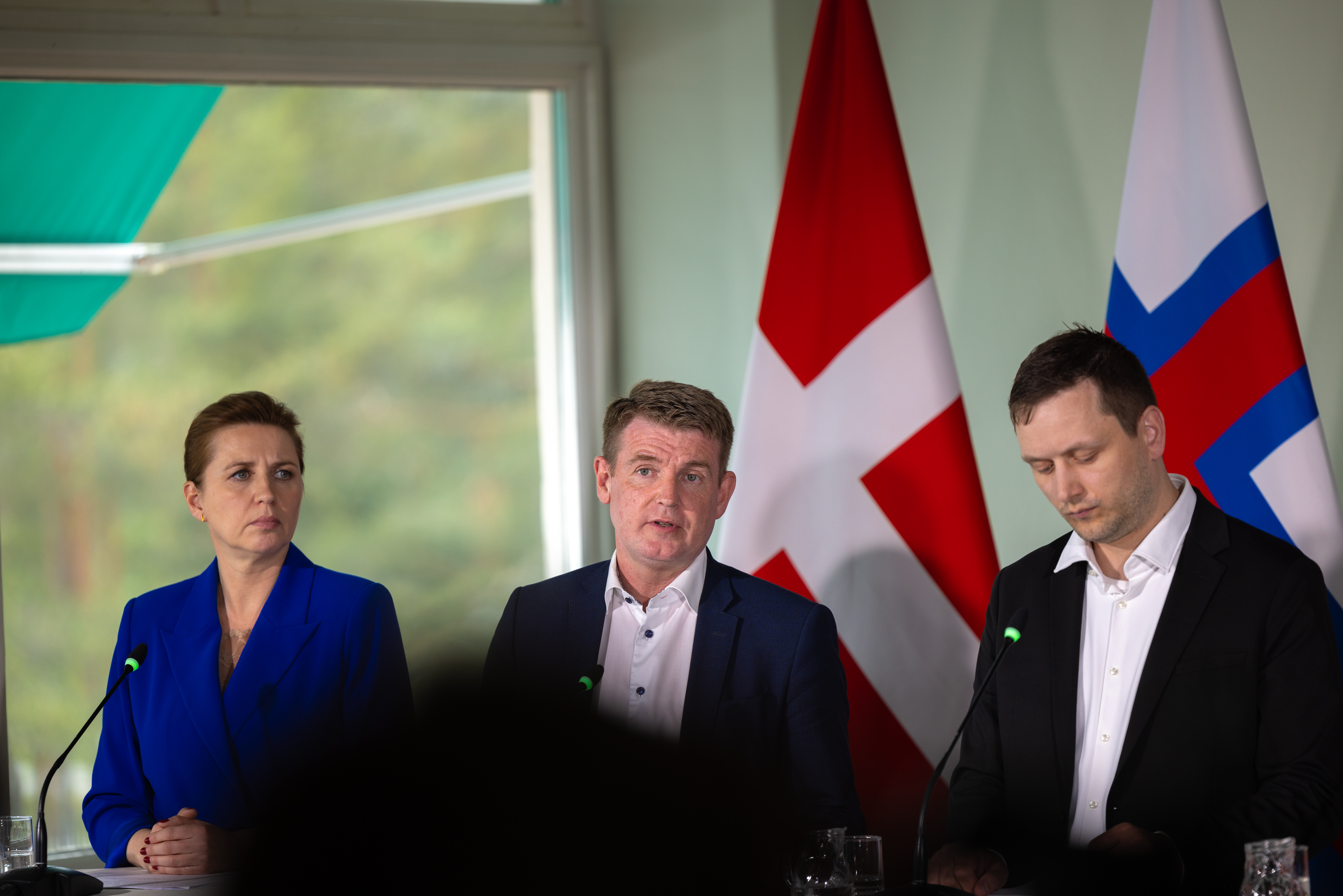
V. Johannesen meeting with Mette Frederiksen and Jens-Frederik Nielsen, 2025

As of 2021, the islanders were evenly split between those favouring independence and those who preferred to continue as a part of the Kingdom of Denmark. Within both camps, there is a wide range of opinions. Of those who favour independence, some are in favour of an immediate unilateral declaration of independence. Others see independence as something to be attained gradually and with the full consent of the Danish government and the Danish nation. In the unionist camp, many foresee and welcome a gradual increase in autonomy even while strong ties with Denmark are maintained.

Two attempts have been made to draft a separate Faroese constitution. The first time was in 2011, when the then prime minister Lars Løkke Rasmussen denounced it as incompatible with Denmark's constitution, stating that if the Faroe Islands wished to continue with the move, they must declare independence. A second attempt was made in 2015, facing similar criticisms before eventually being withdrawn without a vote.

=== Relationship with the European Union ===
As explicitly asserted by both treaties of the European Union, the Faroe Islands are not part of the European Union. The Faroes are not grouped with the EU when it comes to international trade; for instance, when the EU and Russia imposed reciprocal trade sanctions on each other over the war in Donbas in 2014, the Faroes began exporting significant amounts of fresh salmon to Russia. Moreover, a protocol to the treaty of accession of Denmark to the European Communities stipulates that Danish nationals residing in the Faroe Islands are not considered Danish nationals within the meaning of the treaties. Hence, Danish people living in the Faroes are not citizens of the European Union (though other EU nationals living there remain EU citizens). The Faroes are not covered by the Schengen Agreement, but there are no border checks when travelling between the Faroes and any Schengen country (the Faroes have been part of the Nordic Passport Union since 1966, and since 2001 there have been no permanent border checks between the Nordic countries and the rest of the Schengen Area as part of the Schengen agreement).

=== Relationship with international organisations ===
The Faroe Islands are not fully independent, but they do have political relations directly with other countries through an agreement with Denmark. The Faroe Islands is a member of some international organisations as though they were an independent country. The Faroes have associate membership in the Nordic Council but have expressed wishes for full membership.

The Faroe Islands are a member of several international sports federations like UEFA, FIFA in football and FINA in swimming and EHF in handball and have their own national teams. They also have their own telephone country code, +298, Internet country code top-level domain, .fo, banking code FO, and postal code system.

The Faroe Islands make their own agreements with other countries regarding trade and commerce. When the European Union imposed sanctions against the Russian Federation in 2014, the Faroe Islands were not a part of the embargo because they are not a part of EU, and the islands had just themselves experienced a year of embargo from the EU including Denmark against the islands; the Faroese prime minister Kaj Leo Johannesen went to Moscow to negotiate the trade between Russia and the Faroe Islands. The Faroese minister of fisheries negotiates with the EU and other countries regarding the rights to fish.

In mid-2005, representatives of the Faroe Islands raised the possibility of their territory joining the European Free Trade Association (EFTA). According to Article 56 of the EFTA Convention, only states may become members of the EFTA. The Faroes are an autonomous territory of the Kingdom of Denmark, and not a sovereign state in their own right. Consequently, they considered the possibility that the "Kingdom of Denmark in respect of the Faroes" could join the EFTA, though the Danish Government has stated that this mechanism would not allow the Faroes to become a separate member of the EEA because Denmark was already a party to the EEA Agreement. The Government of Denmark officially supports new membership of the EFTA with effect for the Faroe Islands.

=== Defence ===
Defence is the responsibility of the Danish government. The 1st Squadron of the Royal Danish Navy is primarily focused on national operations in and around the Faroe Islands and Greenland. As of 2023, the 1st Squadron comprises

- four Thetis-class patrol vessels;
- three Knud Rasmussen-class patrol vessels; and
- the royal yacht HDMY Dannebrog (having a secondary surveillance and sea-rescue role)

After 2025, the Thetis-class vessels are to be replaced by the planned MPV80-class ships. The new vessels will incorporate a modular concept enabling packages of different systems (for minehunting or minelaying, for example) to be fitted to individual ships as may be required.

In 2022, the Danish and Faroe Islands governments signed an agreement to establish an air surveillance radar system on the islands. The radar will monitor airspace between Iceland, Norway, and Britain with a reported range of 300–400 kilometres (190–250 mi).

In addition to naval units, the Royal Danish Air Force can provide C-130J and Challenger 604 aircraft from Squadron 721 for search and rescue as well as surveillance missions.

== Demographics ==
Historical population
Year	Pop.	±%
1327	4,000	—
1350	2,000	−50.0%
1769	4,773	+138.6%
1801	5,225	+9.5%
1834	6,928	+32.6%
1850	8,137	+17.5%
1880	11,220	+37.9%
1900	15,230	+35.7%
1925	22,835	+49.9%
1950	31,781	+39.2%
1975	40,441	+27.2%
1985	45,749	+13.1%
1995	43,358	−5.2%
2000	46,196	+6.5%
2006	48,219	+4.4%
2011	48,346	+0.3%
2016	49,554	+2.5%
2020	52,110	+5.2%
2026	54,880	+5.3%
2011 data 2019:

The vast majority of the population are ethnic Faroese, of Norse and Celtic descent. Recent DNA analyses have revealed that Y chromosomes, tracing male descent, are 87% Scandinavian, while mitochondrial DNA, tracing female descent, is 84% Celtic.

There is a gender deficit of about 2,000 women owing to migration. As a result, some Faroese men have married women from the Philippines and Thailand, whom they met through such channels as online dating websites, and arranged for them to emigrate to the islands. This group of approximately three hundred women makes up one of the largest ethnic minorities in the Faroes.

The total fertility rate of the Faroe Islands is one of the highest in Europe. The 2015 fertility rate was 2.409 children born per woman.

The 2011 census shows that of the 48,346 inhabitants of the Faroe Islands (17,441 private households in 2011), 43,135 were born in the Faroe Islands, 3,597 were born elsewhere in the Kingdom of Denmark (Denmark proper or Greenland), and 1,614 were born outside the Kingdom of Denmark. People were also asked about their nationality, including Faroese. Children under 15 were not asked about their nationality. 97% said that they were ethnic Faroese, which means that many of those who were born in either Denmark or Greenland consider themselves ethnic Faroese. The other 3% of those older than 15 said they were not Faroese: 515 were Danish, 433 were from other European countries, 147 came from Asia, 65 from Africa, 55 from the Americas, 23 from Russia.

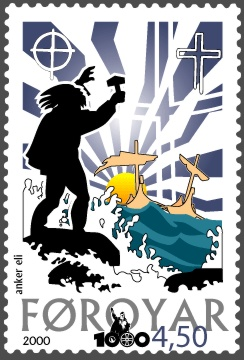
Faroese stamp by Anker Eli Petersen commemorating the arrival of Christianity in the islands

At the beginning of the 1990s, the Faroe Islands entered a deep economic crisis leading to heavy emigration; however, this trend reversed in subsequent years to a net immigration. This has been in the form of a population replacement as young Faroese women leave and are replaced with Asian/Pacific brides. In 2011, there were 2,155 more men than women between the age of 0 to 59 in the Faroe Islands.

=== Language ===
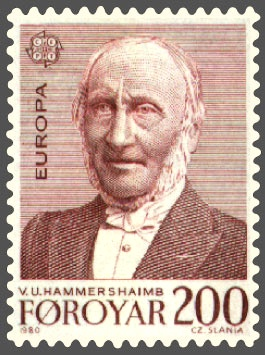
A stamp commemorating V. U. Hammershaimb, a 19th-century Faroese linguist and theologian

As stipulated in section 11 (§ 11) in the 1948 Home Rule Act, Faroese is the primary and official language of the country, although Danish is taught in schools and can be used by the Faroese government in public relations, with public services providing Danish translations of documents on request. Faroese belongs to the North Germanic language branch and is descended from Old Norse, being most closely related to Icelandic. Due to its geographic isolation, it has preserved more conservative grammatical features that have been lost in Danish, Norwegian, and Swedish. It is the only language alongside Icelandic and Elfdalian to preserve the letter Ð, though unlike the others, it is not pronounced.

Faroese sign language was officially adopted as a national language in 2017.

=== Religion ===
According to the Færeyinga saga, Sigmundur Brestisson brought Christianity to the islands in 999. However, archaeology at a site in Toftanes, Leirvík, named Bønhústoftin (English: "the prayer-house ruin") and over a dozen slabs from Ólansgarður in the small island of Skúvoy which in the main display encircled linear and outline crosses, suggest that Celtic Christianity may have arrived at least 150 years earlier. The Faroe Islands' Church Reformation was completed on 1 January 1540. According to official statistics from 2019, 79.7% of the Faroese population are members of the state church, the Church of the Faroe Islands (Fólkakirkjan), following a form of Lutheranism. The Fólkakirkjan became an independent church in 2007; previously it had been a diocese within the Church of Denmark. Faroese members of the clergy who have had historical importance include Venceslaus Ulricus Hammershaimb (1819–1909), Fríðrikur Petersen (1853–1917) and, perhaps most significantly, Jákup Dahl (1878–1944), who had a great influence in ensuring that the Faroese language was spoken in the church instead of Danish. Participation in churches is more prevalent among the Faroese population than among most other Scandinavians.

In the late 1820s, the Christian Evangelical religious movement, the Plymouth Brethren, was established in England. In 1865, a member of this movement, William Gibson Sloan, travelled to the Faroes from Shetland. At the turn of the 20th century, the Faroese Plymouth Brethren numbered thirty. Today, around 10% of the Faroese population are members of the Open Brethren community (Brøðrasamkoman). About 3% belong to the Charismatic Movement. There are several charismatic churches around the islands, the largest of which, called Keldan (The Spring), has about 200 to 300 members. About 2% belong to other Christian groups. . Jehovah's Witnesses also have four congregations with a total of 121 members. The Roman Catholic congregation has about 270 members and falls under the jurisdiction of Denmark's Roman Catholic Diocese of Copenhagen. The municipality of Tórshavn has both Franciscan and Adventists private schools.

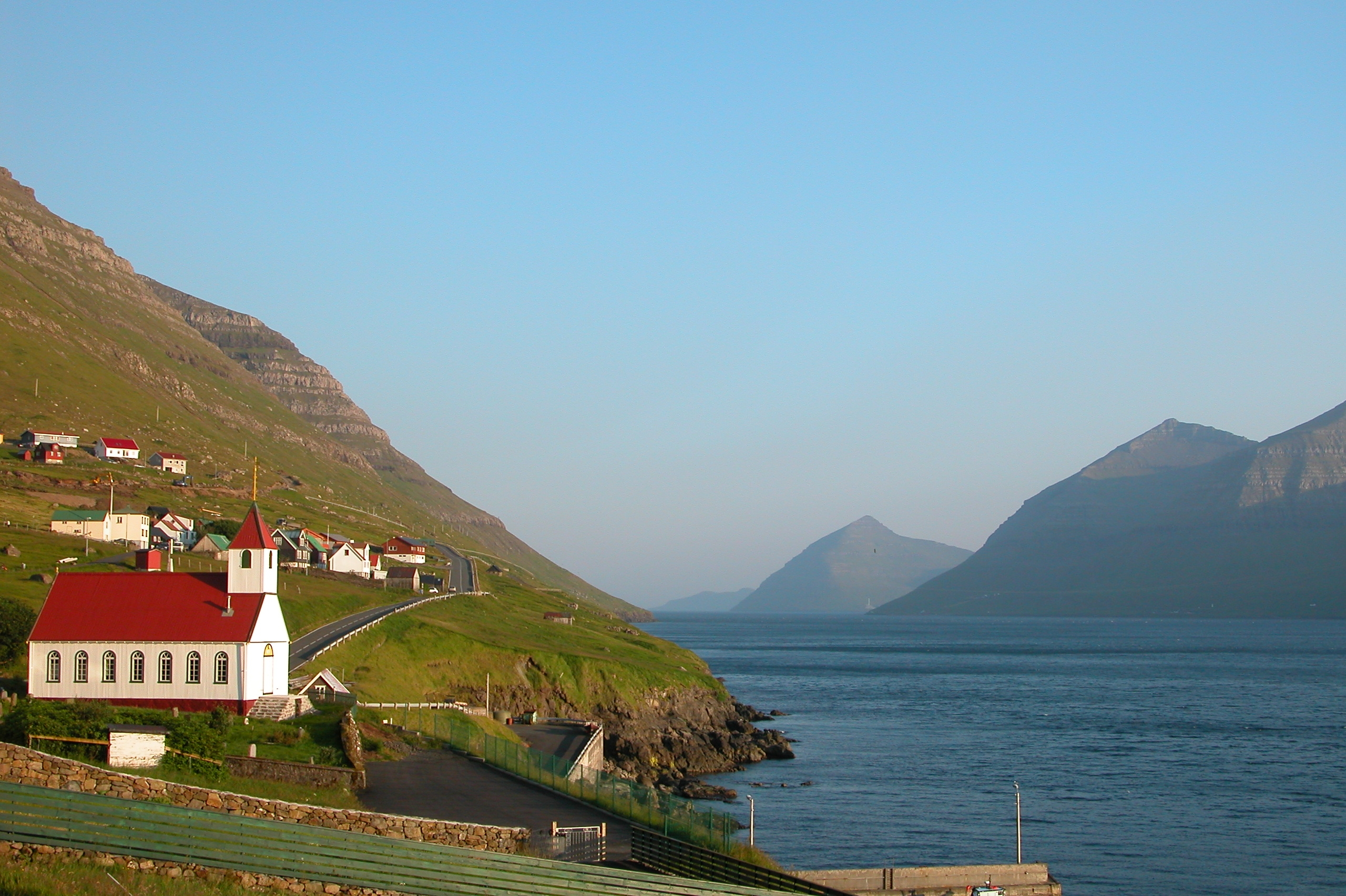
Church on the island of Kunoy

Unlike Denmark, Sweden and Iceland, the Faroes have no organised Heathen community.

The best-known church buildings in the Faroe Islands include Tórshavn Cathedral, Olaf II of Norway's Church and the Magnus Cathedral in Kirkjubøur; the Vesturkirkjan and the St. Mary's Church, both of which are situated in Tórshavn; the church of Fámjin; the octagonal church in Haldórsvík; and Christianskirkjan in Klaksvík.

In 1948, Victor Danielsen completed the first Bible translation into Faroese from different modern languages. Jacob Dahl and Kristian Osvald Viderø (Fólkakirkjan) completed the second translation in 1961. The latter was translated from the original Biblical languages (Hebrew and Greek) into Faroese.

According to the 2011 Census, there were 33,018 Christians (95.44%), 23 Muslims (0.07%), 7 Hindus (0.02%), 66 Buddhists (0.19%), 12 Jews (0.03%), 13 Baháʼís (0.04%), 3 Sikhs (0.01%), 149 others (0.43%), 85 with more than one belief (0.25%), and 1,397 with no religion (4.04%).

=== Education ===
The levels of education in the Faroe Islands are primary, secondary, and higher education. Most institutions are funded by the state; there are few private schools in the Faroe Islands. Education is compulsory for 9 years between the ages of 7 and 16.

Compulsory education consists of seven years of primary education and two years of lower secondary education; it is public, free of charge, provided by the respective municipalities, and is called the Fólkaskúli in Faroese. The Fólkaskúli also provides optional preschool education as well as the tenth year of education that is a prerequisite to being admitted to upper secondary education. Students who complete compulsory education are allowed to continue education in a vocational school, where they can have job-specific training and education. Since the fishing industry is an important part of Faroe Islands' economy, maritime schools are an important part of Faroese education. Upon completion of the tenth year of Fólkaskúli, students can continue to upper secondary education, which consists of several different types of schools. Higher education is offered at the University of the Faroe Islands; a part of Faroese youth moves abroad to pursue higher education, mainly in Denmark. Other forms of education comprise adult education and music schools. The structure of the Faroese educational system bears resemblances with its Danish counterpart.

In the 12th century, education was provided by the Catholic Church in the Faroe Islands. The Church of Denmark took over education after the Protestant Reformation. Modern educational institutions started operating in the last quarter of the nineteenth century and developed throughout the twentieth century. The status of the Faroese language in education was a significant issue for decades until it was accepted as a language of instruction in 1938. Initially education was administered and regulated by Denmark. In 1979 responsibilities on educational issues started transferring to the Faroese authorities, a procedure which was completed in 2002.

The Ministry of Education, Research and Culture has the jurisdiction of educational responsibility in the Faroe Islands. Since the Faroe Islands are a part of the Danish Realm, education in the Faroe Islands is influenced and has similarities with the Danish educational system; there is an agreement on educational cooperation between the Faroe Islands and Denmark. In 2012 the public spending on education was 8.1% of GDP. The municipalities are responsible for the school buildings for children's education in Fólkaskúlin from age 1st grade to 9th or 10th grade (age 7 to 16). In November 2013 1,615 people, or 6.8% of the total number of employees, were employed in the education sector. Of the 31,270 people aged 25 and above 1,717 (5.5%) have gained at least a master's degrees or a Ph.D., 8,428 (27%) have gained a B.Sc. or a diploma, 11,706 (37.4%) have finished upper secondary education while 9,419 (30.1%) has only finished primary school and have no other education. There is no data on literacy in the Faroe Islands, but the CIA Factbook states that it is probably as high as in Denmark proper, i.e. 99%.

The majority of students in upper secondary schools are women, although men represent the majority in higher education institutions. In addition, most young Faroese people who relocate to other countries to study are women. Out of 8,535 holders of bachelor degrees, 4,796 (56.2%) have had their education in the Faroe Islands, 2,724 (31.9%) in Denmark, 543 in both the Faroe Islands and Denmark, 94 (1.1%) in Norway, 80 in the United Kingdom and the rest in other countries. Out of 1,719 holders of master's degrees or PhDs, 1,249 (72.7%) have had their education in Denmark, 87 (5.1%) in the United Kingdom, 86 (5%) in both the Faroe Islands and Denmark, 64 (3.7%) in the Faroe Islands, 60 (3.5%) in Norway and the rest in other countries (mostly EU and Nordic). Since there is no medical school in the Faroe Islands, all medical students have to study abroad; as of 2013, out of a total of 96 medical students, 76 studied in Denmark, 19 in Poland, and 1 in Hungary.

== Economy ==
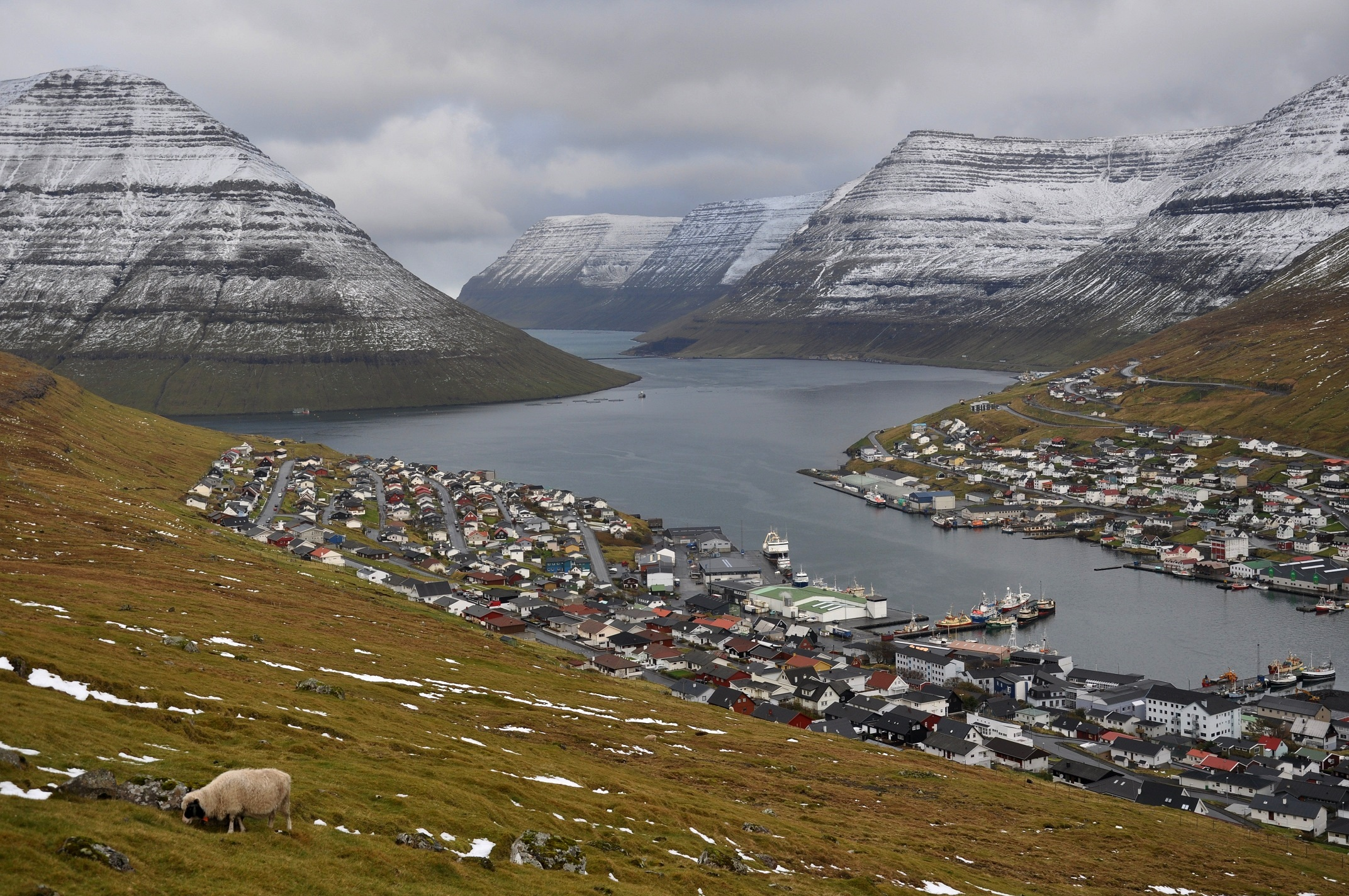
Klaksvík, on the island of Borðoy, is the Faroe Islands' second-largest town.

Economic troubles caused by the collapse of the Faroese fishing industry in the early 1990s brought high unemployment rates of 10 to 15% by the mid-1990s. Unemployment decreased in the later 1990s, down to about 6% at the end of 1998. By June 2008 unemployment had declined to 1.1%, before rising to 3.4% in early 2009. In December 2019 the unemployment reached a record low 0.9%. Nevertheless, the almost total dependence on fishing and fish farming means that the economy remains vulnerable. The largest private company of the Faroe Islands is the salmon farming company Bakkafrost, which is also the largest of the four salmon farming companies in the Faroe Islands, and eighth largest in the world.

In 2011, 13% of the Faroe Islands' national income consists of economic aid from Denmark, corresponding to roughly 5% of GDP.

Since 2000, the government has fostered new information technology and business projects to attract new investment. The introduction of Burger King in Tórshavn was widely publicised as a sign of the globalisation of Faroese culture. It remains to be seen whether these projects will succeed in broadening the islands' economic base. The islands have one of the lowest unemployment rates in Europe, but this should not necessarily be taken as a sign of a recovering economy, as many young students move to Denmark and other countries after leaving high school. This leaves a largely middle-aged and elderly population that may lack the skills and knowledge to fill newly developed positions in the Faroes. Nonetheless, in 2008, the Faroes were able to make a $52 million loan to Iceland in the wake of the 2008 financial crisis.

On 5 August 2009, two opposition parties introduced a bill in the Løgting to adopt the euro as the national currency, pending a referendum. The euro was not adopted.

== Transportation ==
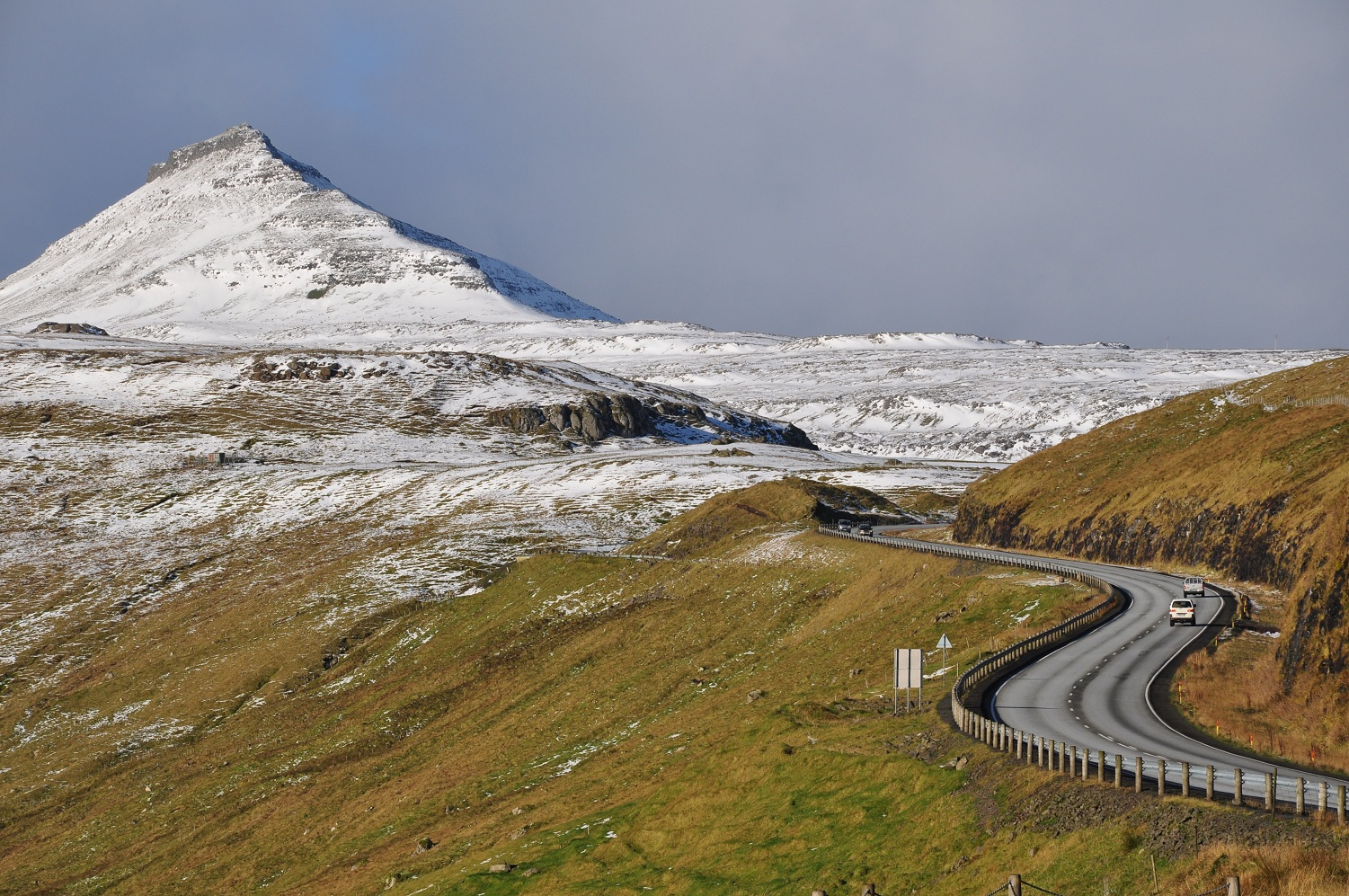
The road from Skipanes to Syðrugøta, on the island of Eysturoy

By road, the main islands are connected by bridges and tunnels. Government-owned Strandfaraskip Landsins provides public bus and ferry service to the main towns and villages. There are no railways.

By air, Scandinavian Airlines and the government-owned Atlantic Airways both have scheduled international flights to Vágar Airport, the islands' only airport. Atlantic Airways also provides helicopter service to each of the islands. All civil aviation matters are controlled by the Civil Aviation Administration Denmark.

By sea, Smyril Line operates a regular international passenger, car, and freight service linking the Faroe Islands with Seyðisfjörður, Iceland, and Hirtshals, Denmark.

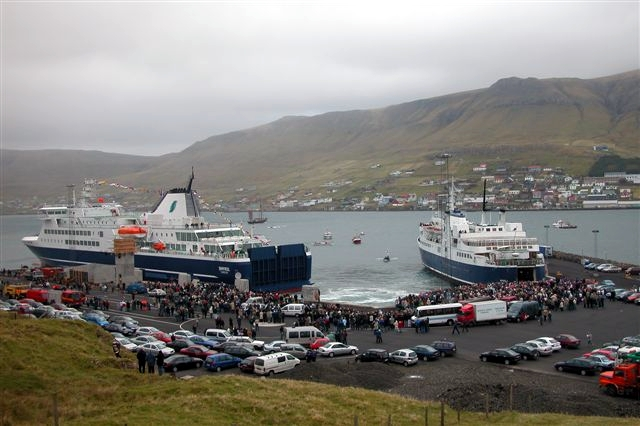
The ferry MS Smyril enters the Faroe Islands at Krambatangi ferry port in Suðuroy.

The Faroes have a highly developed road network connecting almost all settlements by tunnels through the mountains and between the islands, bridges, and causeways that link together the four largest islands and three islands to the northeast. Suðuroy is the only major island not connected by a fixed link.

Koltur and Stóra Dímun have no ferry connection, only a helicopter service. Other small islands—Mykines to the west, Kalsoy, Svínoy and Fugloy to the north, Hestur west of Streymoy, and Nólsoy east of Tórshavn—have smaller ferries and some of these islands also have helicopter service.

Since 2014, the Faroese government has emphasised expanding fixed road connections between islands. In 2020 the Eysturoyartunnilin opened, greatly reducing travel time between Eysturoy and Tórshavn. In 2023, the Faroes' longest single-length tunnel opened, Sandoyartunnilin, linking Sandoy to the greater Faroese road network on Streymoy. A tunnel between Sandoy and Suðuroy, named Suðuroyartunnilin, has been approved. When completed, 99% of the Faroes would be connected by road.

== Culture ==
The culture of the Faroe Islands has its roots in Nordic culture. The Faroe Islands were long isolated from the main cultural phases and movements that swept across mainland Europe. This means that they have maintained a great part of their traditional culture. The language spoken is Faroese, which is one of three insular North Germanic languages descended from the Old Norse language spoken in Scandinavia in the Viking Age, the others being Icelandic and the extinct Norn, which is thought to have been mutually intelligible with Faroese. Until the 15th century, Faroese had a similar orthography to Icelandic and Norwegian, but after the Reformation in 1538, the ruling Norwegians outlawed its use in schools, churches, and official documents. Although a rich spoken tradition survived for 300 years, the language was not written down. This means that all poems and stories were handed down orally. These works were split into the following divisions: sagnir (historical), ævintýr (stories) and kvæði (ballads), often set to music and the medieval chain dance. These were eventually written down in the 19th century.

=== Literature ===
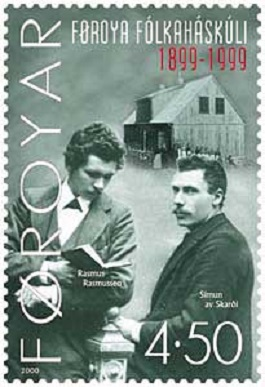
Rasmus Rasmussen, the writer who wrote the first novel in the Faroese language (poetical name: Regin í Líð), and Símun av Skarði, the poet who wrote the Faroese national anthem

Faroese written literature has developed only in the past 100–200 years. This is mainly because of the islands' isolation and also because the Faroese language did not have a standardised writing system. The Danish language was also encouraged at the expense of the Faroese. Nevertheless, the Faroes have produced several authors and poets. A rich centuries-old oral tradition of folk tales and Faroese folk songs accompanied the Faroese chain dance. The people learned these songs and stories by heart and told or sang them to each other, teaching the younger generations, too. This kind of literature was gathered in the 19th century and early 20th century. The Faroese folk songs, in Faroese called kvæði, are still in use, although not as broadly as earlier.

The first Faroese novel, Bábelstornið by Regin í Líð, was published in 1909; the second novel was published 18 years later. In the period 1930 to 1940 a writer from the village Skálavík on Sandoy island, Heðin Brú, published three novels: Lognbrá (1930), Fastatøkur (1935) and Feðgar á ferð (English title: The old man and his sons) (1940). Feðgar á ferð has been translated into several other languages. Martin Joensen from Sandvík wrote about life on Faroese fishing vessels; he published the novels Fiskimenn (1946) and Tað lýsir á landi (1952).

Well-known poets from the early 20th century include the two brothers from Tórshavn: Hans Andrias Djurhuus (1883–1951) and Janus Djurhuus (1881–1948); other well known poets from this period and the mid 20th century are Poul F. Joensen (1898–1970), Regin Dahl (1918–2007), and Tummas Napoleon Djurhuus (1928–71). Their poems are popular even today and can be found in Faroese song books and school books. Jens Pauli Heinesen (1932–2011), a school teacher from Sandavágur, was the most productive Faroese novelist; he published 17 novels. Steinbjørn B. Jacobsen (1937–2012), a schoolteacher from Sandvík, wrote short stories, plays, children's books, and even novels. Most Faroese writers write in Faroese; two exceptions are William Heinesen (1900–91) and Jørgen-Frantz Jacobsen (1900–38).

Women were not so visible in the early Faroese literature except for Helena Patursson (1864–1916), but in the last decades of the 20th century and in the beginning of the 21st-century female writers like Ebba Hentze (born 1933) wrote children's books, short stories, etc. Guðrið Helmsdal published the first collection of modernist poems, Lýtt lot, in 1963, which at the same time was the first collection of Faroese poems written by a woman. Her daughter, Rakel Helmsdal (born 1966), is also a writer, best known for her children's books, for which she has won several prizes and nominations. Other female writers are the novelists Oddvør Johansen (born 1941), Bergtóra Hanusardóttir (born 1946) and novelist/children's books writers Marianna Debes Dahl (born 1947), and Sólrun Michelsen (born 1948). Other modern Faroese writers include Gunnar Hoydal (born 1941), Hanus Kamban (born 1942), Jógvan Isaksen (born 1950), Jóanes Nielsen (born 1953), Tóroddur Poulsen and Carl Jóhan Jensen (born 1957). Some of these writers have been nominated for the Nordic Council's Literature Prize two to six times but have never won it. The only Faroese writer who writes in Faroese to have won the prize is the poet Rói Patursson (born 1947), who was awarded in 1986 for Líkasum. In 2007 the first ever Faroese/German anthology "From Janus Djurhuus to Tóroddur Poulsen – Faroese Poetry during 100 Years", edited by Paul Alfred Kleinert, including a short history of Faroese literature was published in Leipzig.

In the 21st century, some new writers have had success in the Faroe Islands and abroad. Bárður Oskarsson (born 1972) is a children's book writer and illustrator; his books won prizes in the Faroes, Germany, and the West Nordic Council's Children and Youth Literature Prize (2006). Though not born in the Faroe Islands, Matthew Landrum, an American poet and editor for Structo magazine, has written a collection of poems about the Islands. Sissal Kampmann (born 1974) won the Danish literary prize Klaus Rifbjerg's Debutant Prize (2012), and Rakel Helmsdal has won Faroese and Icelandic awards; she has been nominated for the West Nordic Council's Children and Youth Literature Prize and the Children and Youth Literature Prize of the Nordic Council (representing Iceland, wrote the book together with and Icelandic and a Swedish writer/illustrator). Marjun Syderbø Kjelnæs (born 1974) had success with her first novel Skriva í sandin for teenagers; the book was awarded and nominated both in the Faroes and in other countries. She won the Nordic Children's Book Prize (2011) for this book, White Raven Deutsche Jugendbibliothek (2011) and nominated the West Nordic Council's Children and Youth Literature Prize and the Children and Youth Literature Prize of the Nordic Council (2013).

=== Music ===
The Faroe Islands have an active music scene, with live music being a regular part of the Islands' life and many Faroese being proficient at several instruments. Multiple Danish Music Award winner Teitur Lassen calls the Faroes home and is arguably the islands' most internationally well-known musical export.

The Islands have their own orchestra (the classical ensemble Aldubáran) and many different choirs; the best-known of these is Havnarkórið. The best-known local Faroese composers are Sunleif Rasmussen and Kristian Blak, who is also head of the record company Tutl. The first Faroese opera was by Sunleif Rasmussen. It is entitled Í Óðamansgarði (The Madman's Garden) and premiered on 12 October 2006 at the Nordic House. The opera is based on a short story by the writer William Heinesen.

Notable young Faroese musicians include Eivør Pálsdóttir, Høgni Reistrup, Høgni Lisberg, Heidrik (Heiðrikur á Heygum), Guðrið Hansdóttir, and Brandur Enni. In 2023, Reiley became the first Faroese artist to represent Denmark in the Eurovision Song Contest. In 2025, Sissal became the second Faroese artist to represent Denmark in the Eurovision Song Contest, and the first to qualify for the Grand Final.

Well-known bands include Týr, Hamferð, The Ghost, Boys in a Band, 200, and SIC.

A festival of contemporary and classical music, Summartónar, is held each summer. The G! Festival in Norðragøta in July and Summarfestivalurin in Klaksvík in August are both large, open-air music festivals for popular music with local and international acts participating. Havnar Jazzfelag was established on 21 November 1975 and is still active, as well as arranging VetrarJazz and other jazz festivals in the Faroe Islands.

=== Nordic House in the Faroe Islands ===
The Nordic House in the Faroe Islands (Faroese: Norðurlandahúsið) is the most important cultural institution in the Faroes. It aims to support and promote Scandinavian and Faroese culture, locally and in the Nordic region. Erlendur Patursson (1913–86), a Faroese member of the Nordic Council, raised the idea of a Nordic cultural house in the Faroe Islands. A Nordic competition to choose an architect was held in 1977, in which 158 architects participated. The winners were Ola Steen from Norway and Kolbrún Ragnarsdóttir from Iceland. Staying true to folklore, the architects built the Nordic House to resemble an enchanted hill of elves. The house opened in Tórshavn in 1983. The Nordic House is a cultural organisation under the Nordic Council. The Nordic House is run by a steering committee of eight, of whom three are Faroese and five from other Nordic countries. There is also a local advisory body of fifteen members representing Faroese cultural organisations. The House is managed by a director appointed by the steering committee for a four-year term.

=== Traditional food ===
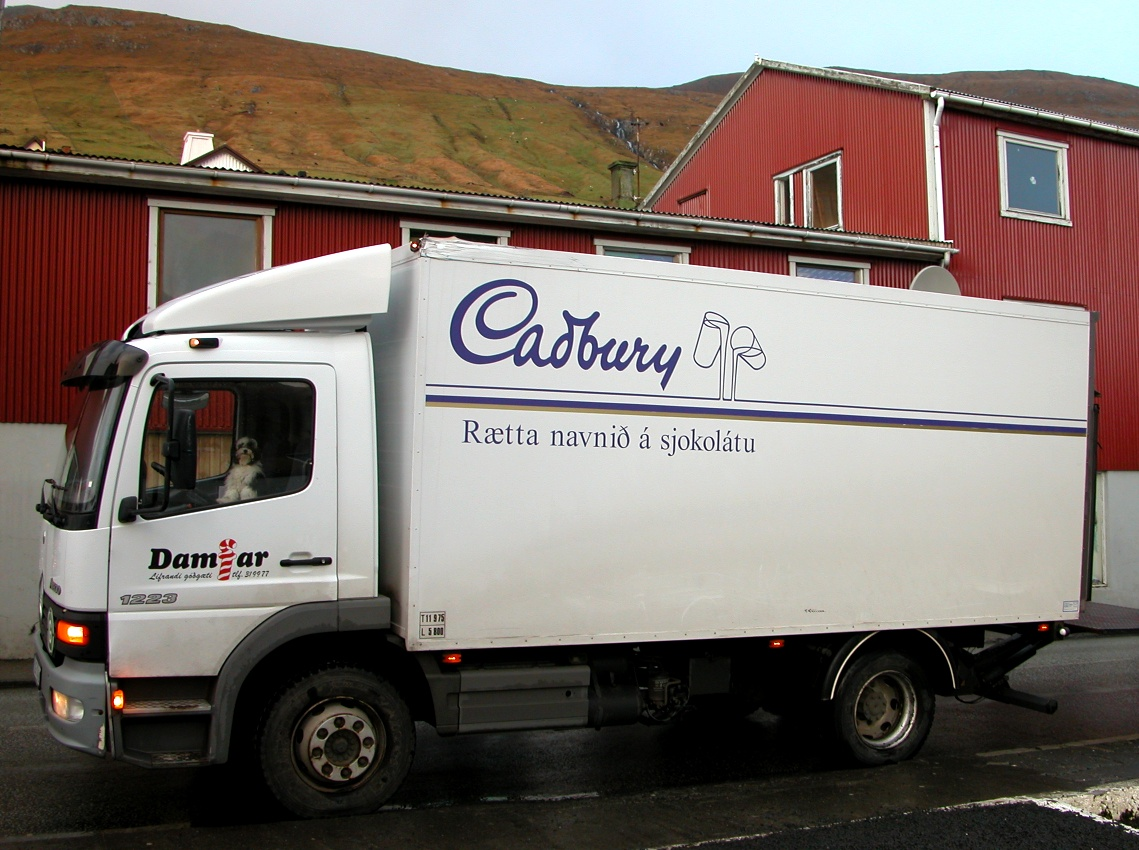
Truck delivering chocolate in the Faroe Islands

Traditional Faroese food is mainly based on meat, seafood, and potatoes and uses a few fresh vegetables. Mutton of the Faroe sheep is the basis of many meals, and one of the most popular treats is skerpikjøt, well-aged, wind-dried, quite chewy mutton. The drying shed, known as a hjallur, is a standard feature in many Faroese homes, particularly in small towns and villages. Other traditional foods are ræst kjøt (semi-dried mutton) and ræstur fiskur (matured fish). Another Faroese speciality is tvøst og spik, made from pilot whale meat and blubber. (A parallel meat/fat dish made with offal is garnatálg.) The tradition of consuming meat and blubber from pilot whales arises from the fact that a single kill can provide many meals. Fresh fish also feature strongly in the traditional local diet, as do seabirds, such as puffins and their eggs. Dried fish is also commonly eaten.

There are two breweries in the Faroe Islands. Föroya Bjór has produced beer since 1888, with exports mainly to Iceland and Denmark. Okkara Bryggjarí was founded in 2010. A local speciality is fredrikk, a special brew made in Nólsoy.

Since the friendly British occupation, the Faroese have been fond of British food, in particular British-style chocolate such as Cadbury Dairy Milk, which is found in many of the island's shops.

=== Whaling ===
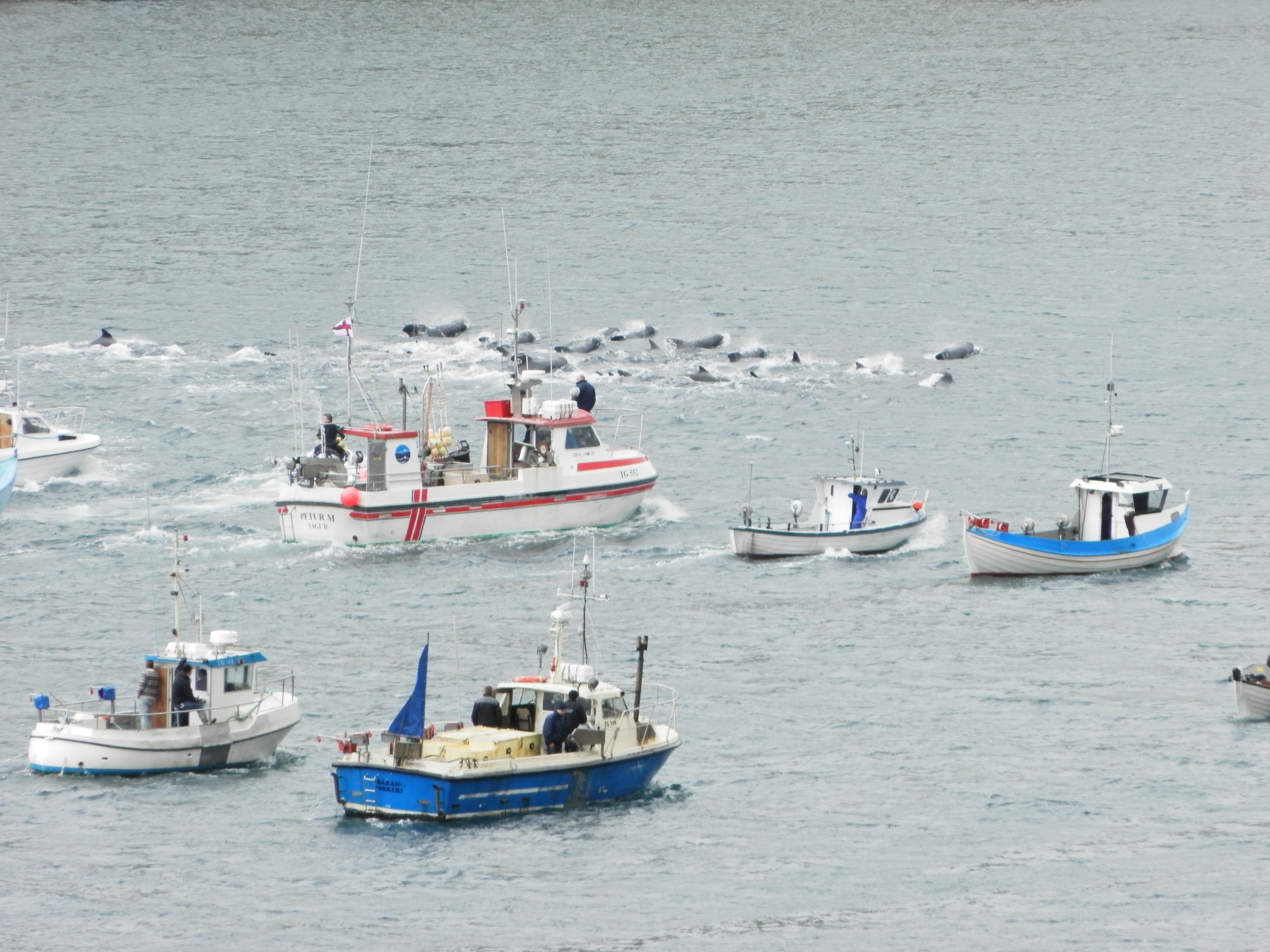
Boats driving a pod of pilot whales into a bay of Suðuroy in 2012

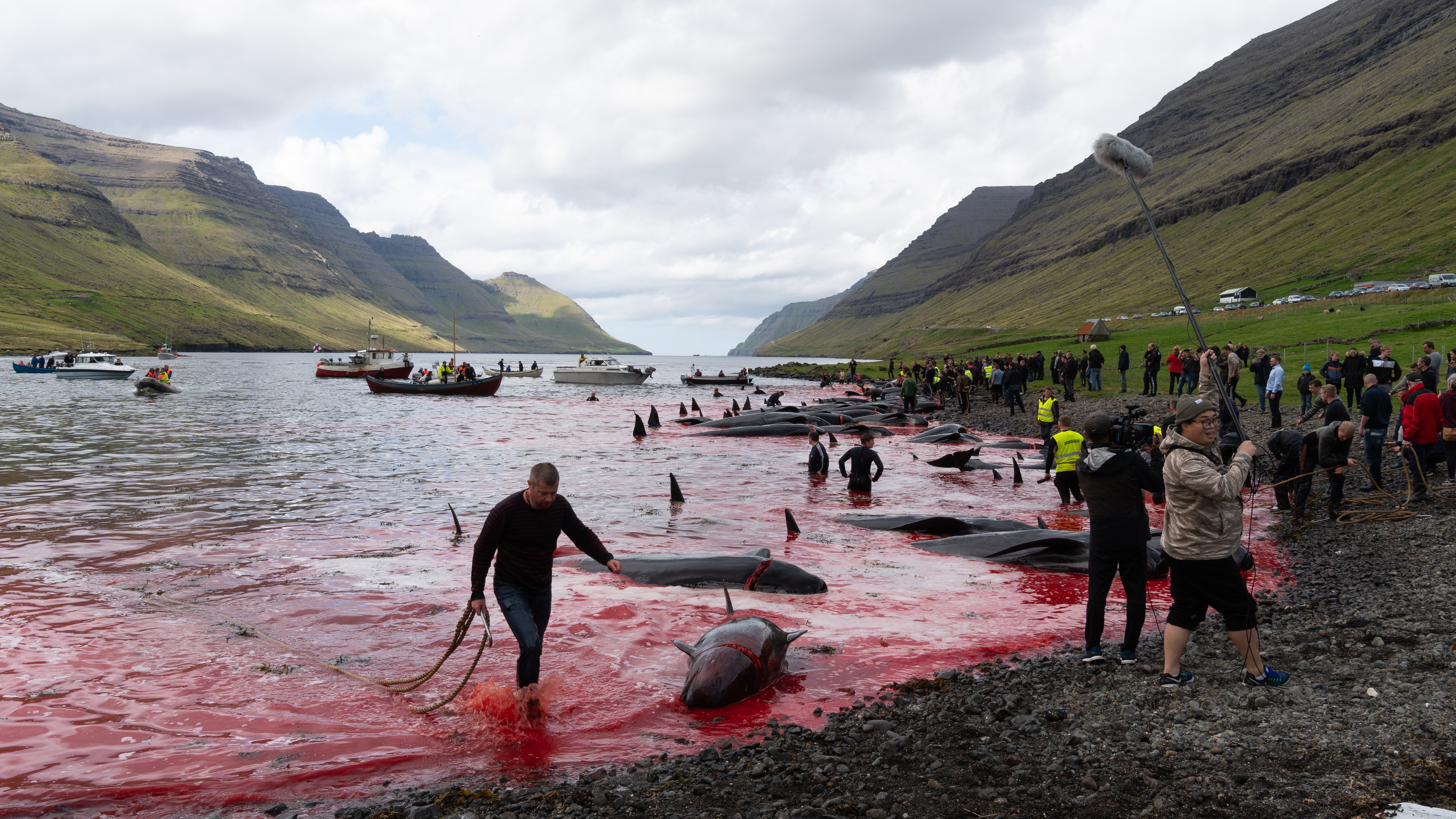
Whaling in Grindadráp, 2018

There are records of drive hunts in the Faroe Islands dating from 1584. Whaling in the Faroe Islands is regulated by Faroese authorities but not by the International Whaling Commission as there are disagreements about the commission's legal authority to regulate cetacean hunts. Hundreds of long-finned pilot whales (Globicephala melaena) could be killed in a year, mainly during the summer. The hunts, called grindadráp in Faroese, are non-commercial and are organised on a community level; anyone can participate. When a whale pod by chance is spotted near land the participating hunters first surround the pilot whales with a wide semicircle of boats and then slowly and quietly begin to drive the whales towards the chosen authorised bay.

Faroese animal welfare legislation, which also applies to whaling, requires that animals are killed as quickly and with as little suffering as possible. A regulation spinal lance is used to sever the spinal cord, which also severs the major blood supply to the brain, ensuring both loss of consciousness and death within seconds. The spinal lance has been introduced as the preferred standard equipment for killing pilot whales and has been shown to reduce killing time to 1–2 seconds.

This grindadráp is legal and provides food for many people in the Faroe Islands. However, a study has found whale meat and blubber currently to be contaminated with mercury and not recommended for human consumption, as too much may cause such adverse health effects as birth defects of the nervous system, high blood pressure, damaged immune system, increased risk for developing Parkinson's disease, hypertension, arteriosclerosis, and diabetes mellitus type 2:

Therefore we recommend that adults eat no more than one to two meals a month. Women who plan to become pregnant within three months, pregnant women, and nursing women should abstain from eating pilot whale meat. Pilot whale liver and kidneys should not be eaten at all.

Animal rights groups such as the Sea Shepherd Conservation Society criticise grindadráp as being cruel and unnecessary since it is no longer necessary as a food source for the Faroese people.

The sustainability of the Faroese pilot whale hunt has been discussed, but with a long-term average catch of around 800 pilot whales on the Faroe Islands a year, the hunt is not considered to have a significant impact on the pilot whale population. There are an estimated 128,000 pilot whales in the Northeast Atlantic, and Faroese whaling is therefore considered a sustainable practice by the Faroese government. Annual records of whale drives and strandings of pilot whales and other small cetaceans provide over 400 years of documentation, including statistics, and represents one of the most comprehensive historical records of wildlife utilisation anywhere in the world.

On 12 September 2021, a super-pod of over 1,420 white-sided dolphins were killed, which caused significant controversy in the Faroe Islands and abroad, leading to the government imposing quotas on the amount of white-sided dolphins allowed to be hunted each year. The UK Government declined to suspend its free-trade agreement with the Faroese, having been called upon by conservationists to do so.

=== Sports ===
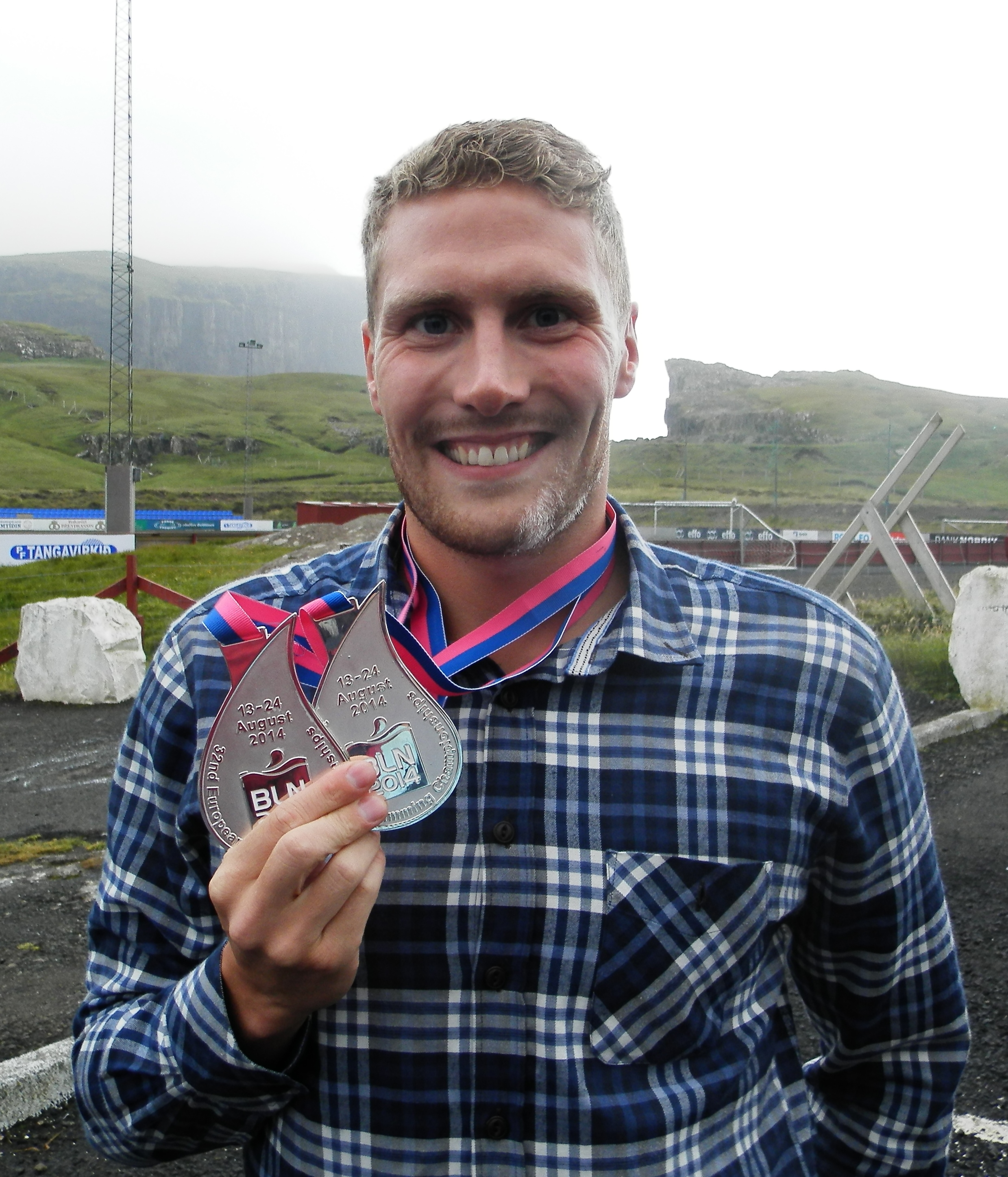
Pál Joensen, Faroese swimmer

Faroese people are very active in sports; they have domestic competitions in football, handball, volleyball, badminton, swimming, outdoor rowing (Faroese kappróður) and indoor rowing in rowing machines, horse riding, shooting, table tennis, judo, golf, tennis, archery, gymnastics, cycling, triathlon, running, and other competitions in athletics.

The Faroe Islands have competed in every biennial Island Games since they were established in 1985. The games were hosted by the Faroes in 1989, and they won the Island Games in 2009.

Football is by far the biggest sports activity on the islands, with 7,000 registered players out of the whole population of 52,000. Ten football teams contest the Faroe Islands Premier League, currently ranked 39th by UEFA's League coefficient. The Faroe Islands are a full member of UEFA, and the Faroe Islands national football team competes in the UEFA European Football Championship qualifiers. The Faroe Islands is also a full member of FIFA and, therefore, the Faroe Islands football team also competes in the FIFA World Cup qualifiers. The Faroe Islands won its first ever competitive match when the team defeated Austria 1–0 in a UEFA Euro 1992 qualifying.

The nation's biggest success in football came in 2014 after defeating Greece 1–0, a result that was considered "the biggest shock of all time" in football thanks to a 169-place distance between the teams in the FIFA World Rankings when the match was played. The team climbed 82 places to 105 on the FIFA ranking after the 1–0 win against Greece. The team went on to defeat Greece again on 13 June 2015 by a score of 2–1. On 9 July 2015, the national football team of the Faroes climbed another 28 places on the FIFA ranking. Recently, Faroe Islands achieved another famous victory by beating Turkey 2–1 in the 2022–23 UEFA Nations League C, although this shock win did not prevent Turkey from achieving promotion to League B.

The Faroe Islands men's national handball team won the first two editions of the IHF Emerging Nations Championship, in 2015 and 2017. The team qualified for the 2024 European Men's Handball Championship in Germany where they ranked 20th out of 24 teams after the draw with Norway and tight games with Slovenia and Poland.

The Faroe Islands are a full member of FINA and compete under their own flag at World Championships, European Championships, and World Cup events. The Faroese swimmer Pál Joensen (born 1990) won a bronze medal at the 2012 FINA World Swimming Championships (25 m) and four silver medals at the European Championships (2010, 2013 and 2014), all medals won in the men's longest and second longest distance, the 1500- and 800-metre freestyle, short and long course. The Faroe Islands also compete in the Paralympics and have won 1 gold, 7 silver, and 5 bronze medals since the 1984 Summer Paralympics.

Two Faroese athletes have competed at the Olympics, but under the Danish flag, since the Olympic Committee does not allow the Faroe Islands to compete under its own flag. The two Faroese who have competed are the swimmer Pál Joensen in 2012 and the rower Katrin Olsen. Olsen competed at the 2008 Summer Olympics in double sculler lightweight together with Juliane Rasmussen. Another Faroese rower, who is a member of the Danish National rowing team, is Sverri Sandberg Nielsen, who currently competes in a single sculler, heavyweight; he has also competed in double sculler. He is the current Danish record holder in the men's indoor rowing, heavyweight; he broke a nine-year-old record in January 2015 and improved it in January 2016. He has also competed at the 2015 World Rowing Championships making it to the semifinal; he competed at the 2015 World Rowing Championship under-23 and made it to the final where he placed fourth.

The Faroe Islands applied to the IOC for full membership in 1984, but as of 2017 they are still not members. At the 2015 European Games in Baku, Azerbaijan, the Faroe Islands were not allowed to compete under the Faroese flag; they were, however, allowed to compete under the Ligue Européenne de Natation flag. Before this, the Faroese prime minister Kaj Leo Holm Johannesen had a meeting with the IOC president Thomas Bach in Lausanne on 21 May 2015 to discuss Faroese membership in the IOC.

During 2014, the Faroe Islands were allowed to compete in the Electronic Sports European Championship (ESEC) in esports. Five players, all of the Faroese nationality, faced Slovenia in the first round, eventually being knocked out with a 0–2 score.

At the 2016 Baku Chess Olympiad, the Faroe Islands got their first chess grandmaster. Helgi Ziska won his third GM norm and thus won the title of chess grandmaster.

=== Clothing ===
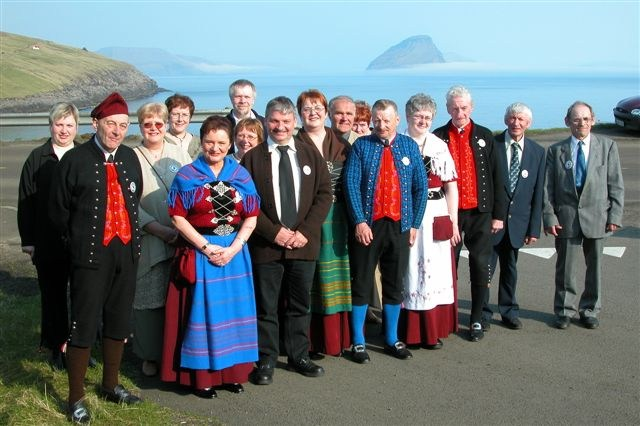
Faroese folk dancers, some of them in national costume

Faroese handicrafts are based on materials available to local villages—mainly wool. Garments include sweaters, scarves, and gloves. Faroese jumpers have distinct Nordic patterns; each village has some regional variations handed down from mother to daughter. There has recently been a strong revival of interest in Faroese knitting, with young people knitting and wearing updated versions of old patterns emphasised by strong colours and bold patterns. This appears to be a reaction to the loss of traditional lifestyles and a way to maintain and assert cultural tradition in a rapidly changing society. Many young people study and move abroad, and this helps them maintain cultural links with their specific Faroese heritage.

There has also been an interest in Faroese sweaterspiqued by the TV series The Killing, where the main actress (Detective Inspector Sarah Lund, played by Sofie Gråbøl) wears them.

Lace knitting is a traditional handicraft. The most distinctive trait of Faroese lace shawls is the centre-back gusset shaping. Each shawl consists of two triangular side panels, a trapezoid-shaped back gusset, an edge treatment, and usually shoulder shaping. These are worn by all generations of women, particularly as an overgarment in the traditional Faroese costume.

The traditional Faroese dress is itself a local handicraft that people invest much time, money, and effort to assemble. It is worn at weddings, traditional dancing events, and on feast days.

A young Faroese person is normally handed down a set of children's Faroese clothes that have passed from generation to generation. Children are traditionally confirmed at age 14 and start to collect the pieces to make an adult outfit, which is considered a rite of passage. Traditionally, the aim would have been to complete the outfit by the time a young person was ready to marry and wear the clothes at the ceremony – though it is mainly only men who do this now.

Each piece is intricately hand-knitted, dyed, woven, or embroidered to the specifications of the wearer. For example, the man's waistcoat is put together by hand in bright blue, red, or black wool. The front is then intricately embroidered with colourful silk threads, often by a female relative. The motifs are often local Faroese flowers or herbs. After this, a row of Faroese-made solid silver buttons is sewn on the outfit.

Women wear embroidered silk, cotton, or wool shawls and pinafores that can take months to weave or embroider with local flora and fauna. They are also adorned with a handwoven black and red ankle-length skirt, knitted black and red jumper, a velvet belt, and black 18th-century style shoes with silver buckles. The outfit is held together by a row of solid silver buttons, silver chains, and locally made silver brooches and belt buckles, often fashioned with Viking-style motifs.

Both men's and women's national dress are extremely costly and can take many years to assemble. Women in the family often work together to assemble the outfits, including knitting the close-fitting jumpers, weaving and embroidering, sewing, and assembling the outfit.

=== Archives ===
The National Archives of the Faroe Islands (Faroese: Tjóðskjalasavnið) is located in Tórshavn. Their main task is to collect, organise, record, and preserve the archival records of the authorities, to make them available to the public in the future. Currently, there are no other permanent archives in the Faroe Islands, but since the end of 2017, the national government has provided financial support for a three-year pilot project under the name "Faroese: Tvøroyrar Skjalasavn", which aims to collect private archives from the area.

=== Libraries ===
The National Library of the Faroe Islands (Faroese: Føroya Landsbókasavn) is based in Tórshavn, and its main task is to collect, record, preserve, and disseminate knowledge of literature related to the Faroe Islands. The National Library also functions as a research library and public library. In addition to the National Library, there are 15 municipal libraries and 11 school libraries in the Faroe Islands.

=== Visual arts ===
The first Faroese art exhibition was held in Tórshavn in 1927. The Faroe Islands' National Gallery (Listasavn Føroya), holds a collection of over 2,500 works of Faroese visual art. It is located within Viðalundin Park in the capital city of Tórshavn. Represented in the collection are paintings, textiles, works on paper, as well as sculpture and installation art.

=== Cinema ===
Faroese filmmakers have made several short films in recent decades, and Katrin Ottarsdóttir, among others, has directed three feature films, several shorts, and documentaries since her debut in 1989 with Rhapsody of the Atlantic. In 2012, the Faroese Geytin Film Award was established. These are two film awards that are presented once a year at a film festival at the Nordic House in Tórshavn in December. Filmmakers enter their films, and a committee selects up to 10 finalists, which are screened at the event at the Nordic House. The main prize, worth DKK 25,000 and a statuette, is called Geytin and is awarded by the Nordic House, while the second prize, the Audience Award (Áskoðaravirðislønin), is worth DKK 15,000 and is awarded by the Thorshavn City Council.

Sakaris Stórá won the first Geytin in December 2012 with the film Summarnátt (Summer Night). In February 2014, his film Vetrarmorgun (Winter Morning) won three awards at the Berlinale. In 2012, Annika á Lofti won the Audience Award. In 2013, Olaf Johannessen won a Robert for Best Supporting Actor in the TV series Forbrydelsen III. In 2013, Dávur Djurhuus Geytin won for the short film Terminal, while Jónfinn Stenberg won the Audience Award for the short film Munch. In 2014, Heiðrikur á Heygum won both the Geytin and the Audience Award for the 30-minute horror film Skuld (Guilt).

Andrias Høgenni won both awards at the 2016 Geytin for the short film A Crack. In 2019, he won the top prize at Geytin for the short Ikki illa meint, which was also awarded at the Cannes Film Festival, Semaine de la Critique, and Danish film awards such as the Robert for Best Short Film and the Fiction award at the Ekko Shortlist Awards.

In 2014, the Faroese Ministry of Culture received a grant in the Finance Act to provide financial support for Faroese films. In 2017, Filmshúsið was established. Filmshúsið is located in Sjóvinnuhúsið in Tórshavn. They will guide and assist the Faroese film community in marketing Faroese films abroad and assist film productions. The Klippfisk film workshop is also located in Sjóvinnuhúsið. Klippfisk is supported by the municipality of Tórshavn and works with young film talent, including organising the annual Nóllywood film school for teenagers. Nóllywood is held on the island of Nólsoy, usually during the summer vacations.

=== Public holidays ===
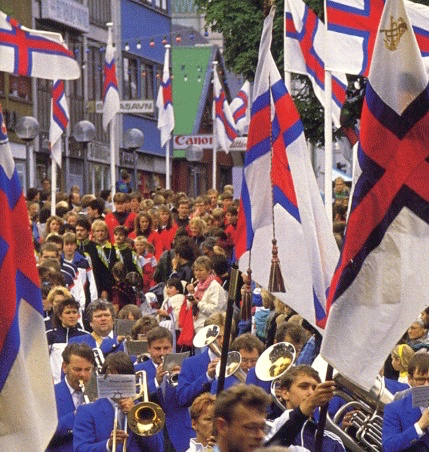
The annual Ólavsøka parade on 28 July 2005

Ólavsøka is on 29 July; it commemorates the death of Saint Olaf. The celebrations are held in Tórshavn, starting on the evening of the 28th and continuing until the 31st. 28 July is a half-working day for the members of some of the labour unions, while Ólavsøkudagur (St Olaf's Day) on 29 July is a full holiday for most union members.

The official celebration starts on the 29th, with the opening of the Faroese Parliament, a custom that dates back 900 years. This begins with a service held in Tórshavn Cathedral; all members of parliament as well as civil and church officials walk to the cathedral in a procession. All of the parish ministers take turns giving the sermon. After the service, the procession returns to the parliament for the opening ceremony.

Other celebrations are marked by different kinds of sports competitions, the rowing competition (in Tórshavn Harbour) being the most popular, art exhibitions, pop concerts, the famous Faroese dance in Sjónleikarhúsið, and on Vaglið outdoor singing on 29 July continuing past midnight. Many also mark the occasion by wearing the national Faroese dress.

- New Year's Day, 1 January.
- Maundy Thursday
- Good Friday
- Easter Sunday
- Easter Monday
- Flag day, 25 April.
- General/Great Prayer Day ([[Store Bededag|Dýri biðidagur]]), 4th Friday after Easter.
- Ascension Day
- Whit Sunday
- Whit Monday
- Constitution Day, 5 June (half-day holiday)
- St. Olav's Eve, 28 July (half-day holiday for some workers' unions).
- St. Olav's Day, 29 July (full holiday for some workers' unions).
- Christmas Eve, 24 December.
- Christmas Day, 25 December.
- Boxing Day, 26 December.
- New Year's Eve, 31 December (half-day holiday).

== See also ==
- List of Faroese people
- Outline of the Faroe Islands
- Faroe Islands–United Kingdom relations
- Gøtudanskt accent

=== Other similar territories ===
- Åland (Finland)
- Svalbard (Norway)

== Sources ==
- Steining, Jørgen (1953). "Rigsdagen og Færøerne". In Bomholt, Jul.; Fabricius, Knud; Hjelholt, Holger; Mackeprang, M.; Møller Andr. (eds.). Den danske rigsdag 1849–1949 bind VI (in Danish). Copenhagen: J. H. Schultz Forlag.
