= Faroe Islands boreal grasslands =

Grasslands ecoregion

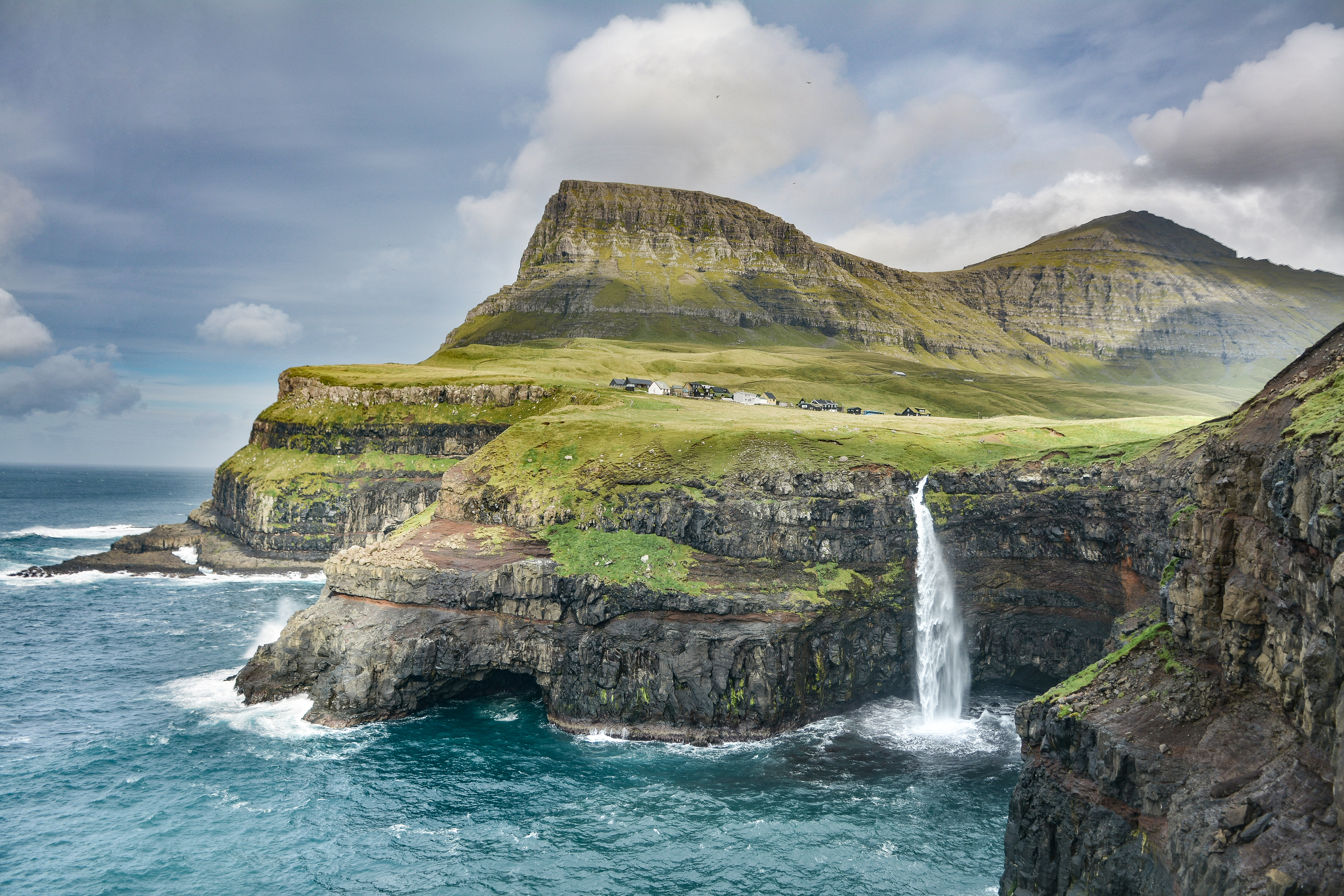
- Waterfall on Vágar Island, Faroe Islands

- Ecoregion territory (in purple)

Ecology
- Realm: Palearctic
- Biome: Temperate grasslands, savannas, and shrublands

Geography
- Area: 1,451 km^{2} (560 sq mi)
- Country: Denmark
- Coordinates: 62°N 6.75°W

The Faroe Islands boreal grasslands ecoregion (WWF ID: PA0807) covers all of the territory of the Faroe Islands, an archipelago of 18 islands in the North Atlantic, roughly equidistant between Scotland, Norway, and Iceland. The ground cover is mostly grassland and dwarf shrub heath (about 80% of the land), the remainder is bare ground or sparse vegetation. There are no forests on the islands.

== Location and description ==
The territory of the ecoregion covers 1,451 square kilometres (560 sq mi) across 18 islands of the archipelago, all clustered within a 100 km circle. The terrain is rocky, with some low peaks (the highest elevation is 882 metres (2,894 ft) at Slættaratindur) and cliffs along much of the coast.

== Climate ==
The climate of the ecoregion is Oceanic climate, subpolar variety (Köppen climate classification (Cfc)). This climate is characterized temperatures cooler than oceanic climates farther from the poles, and with milder winters than those of subarctic or continental climates. No month averages below −3 °C (27 °F), and at least one to three months average above 10 °C (50 °F).

The climate in the Faroes is relatively mild for its position at 61-62 degrees north latitude, being warmed by the North Atlantic Current. There are 210 rainy or snowy days per year, typically cloudy and windy. Precipitation averages 1,321 millimetres (52.0 in) per year, although this can vary locally within the islands depending on elevation and wind patterns.

== Flora and fauna ==
Most of the land cover is alpine-arctic in character: wildflowers, grasses, and common heather (Calluna vulgaris). About 20% of the terrain is bare rock with sparse vegetation or moss and lichen. There are no forests on the island, although remains of birch trees in the soil suggest that trees were more common before the arrival of humans in the 9th century. In recent years, the Faroes have seen the introduction of climate-tolerant tree species from other oceanic areas of the world such as Tierra del Fuego and Alaska.

Sea birds and birds are the most common fauna, with some sea mammals. Common birds include puffins (Fratercula arctica), razorbills (Alca torda), and guillemots (Uria aalge). All land mammals have been introduced by humans.

== Protected areas ==
There are no officially protected areas in this ecoregion.
