= Postal codes in the Faroe Islands =

Postal codes in the Faroe Islands consist of the two letter ISO 3166 code "FO", followed by three digits:

P/F Postverk Føroya
Óðinshædd 22
FO-100 Tórshavn
FAROE ISLANDS

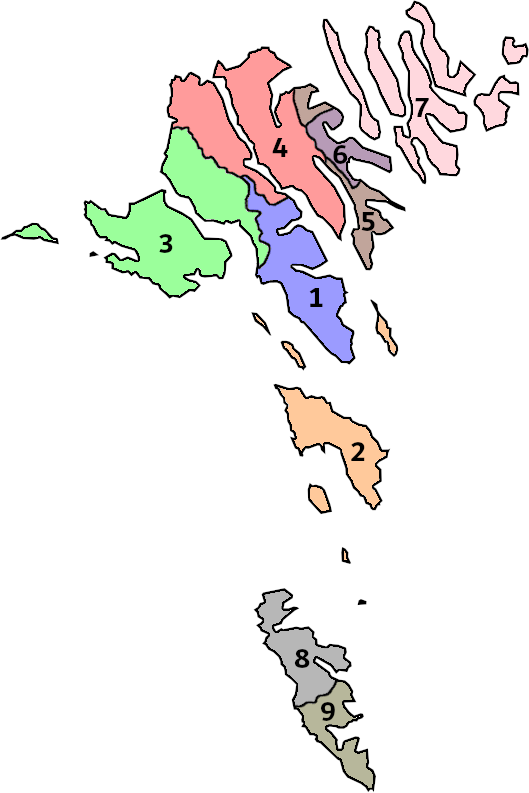
One-digit postcode areas of the Faroe Islands

== PO Box addresses ==
Separate postal codes are used for PO Box addresses, known in Faroese as postsmogur, in the capital Tórshavn and some other towns:

HN Jacobsens Bókahandil
Postboks 55
FO-110 Tórshavn
FAROE ISLANDS

== Former Danish postal codes ==
Previously, the Faroe Islands formed part of the Danish postcode system, introduced in 1967, which also included Greenland. This used the number range 3800 to 3899, and the "DK" prefix for Denmark:

Føroya Ferdamannafelag
DK-3800 Tórshavn
FAROE ISLANDS

Later on, the "FR" prefix was used:

DGU Føroyadeild
Debesartrøð
FR 3800 Tórshavn
FAROE ISLANDS

When the three-digit postal codes were first introduced, they were used for PO Box addresses, alongside the existing four-digit ones.
