= List of Faroese people =

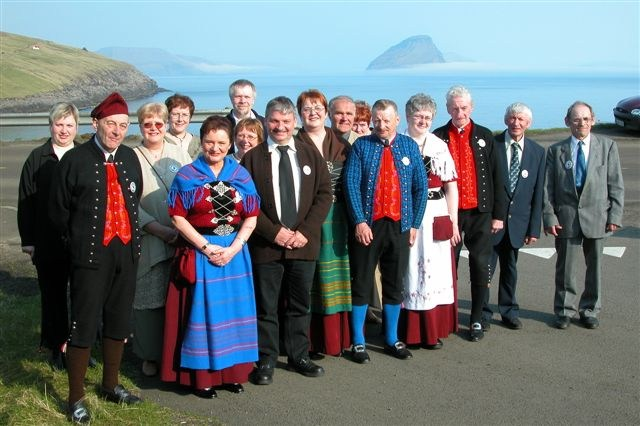
Famous for their peaceful community, unique culture with old ballads and chain-dance, hospitality and cosmopolitanism - despite, or due to their isolated islands in the North Atlantic: Faroese people.

This is a list of famous or important Faroese people. In a small island-society of fewer than 50,000 inhabitants, each person can gain certain meaning for the entire nation. The people listed below, are among those who played or play a distinct role in Faroese culture, politics and history. Many of them are renowned outside the Faroes, especially in Denmark and other Nordic countries.

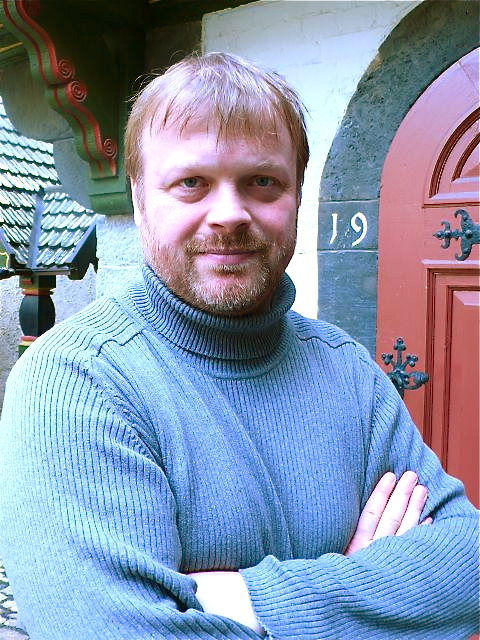
opera singer Runi Brattaberg, 2012

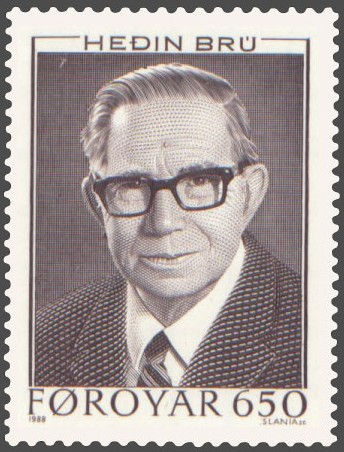
novelist Heðin Brú, 1988

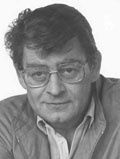
politician Atli Dam, 1970

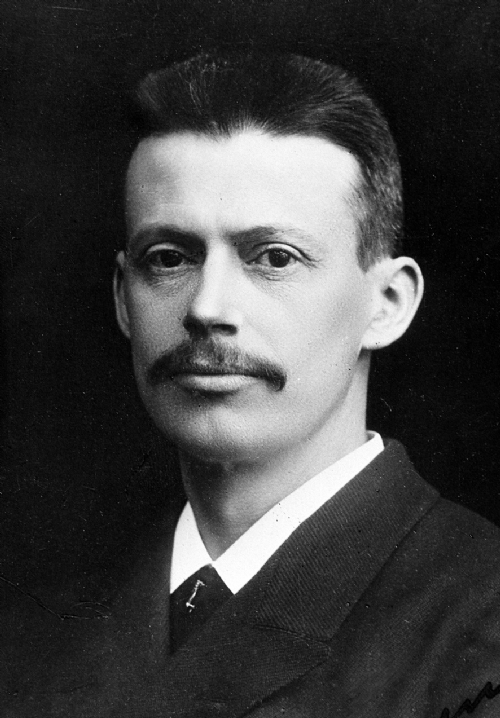
Portrait of 1903 Noble Prize leaurate Niels Ryberg Finsen

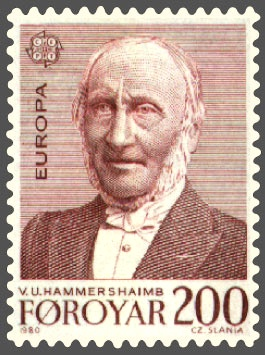
Orthographer Venceslaus Ulricus Hammershaimb, 1980

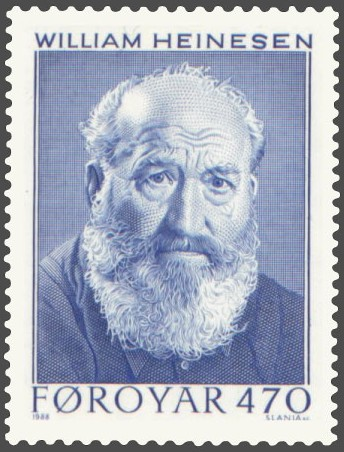
poet William Heinesen, 1988

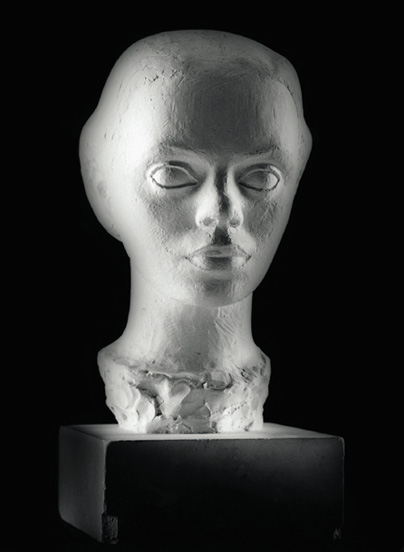
Elinborg Lützen, bust by Janus Kamban, 1995

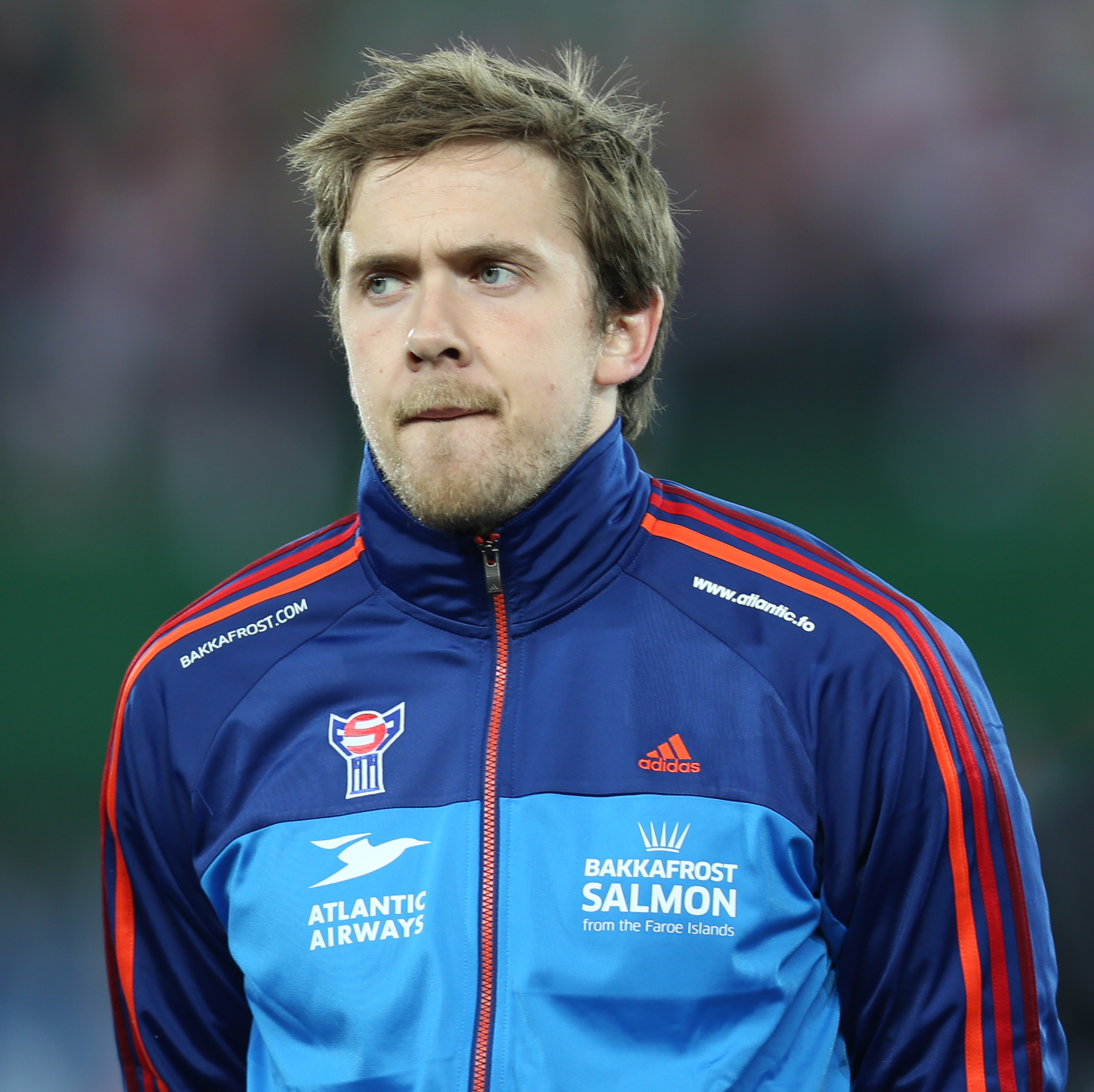
footballer Gunnar Nielsen, 2013

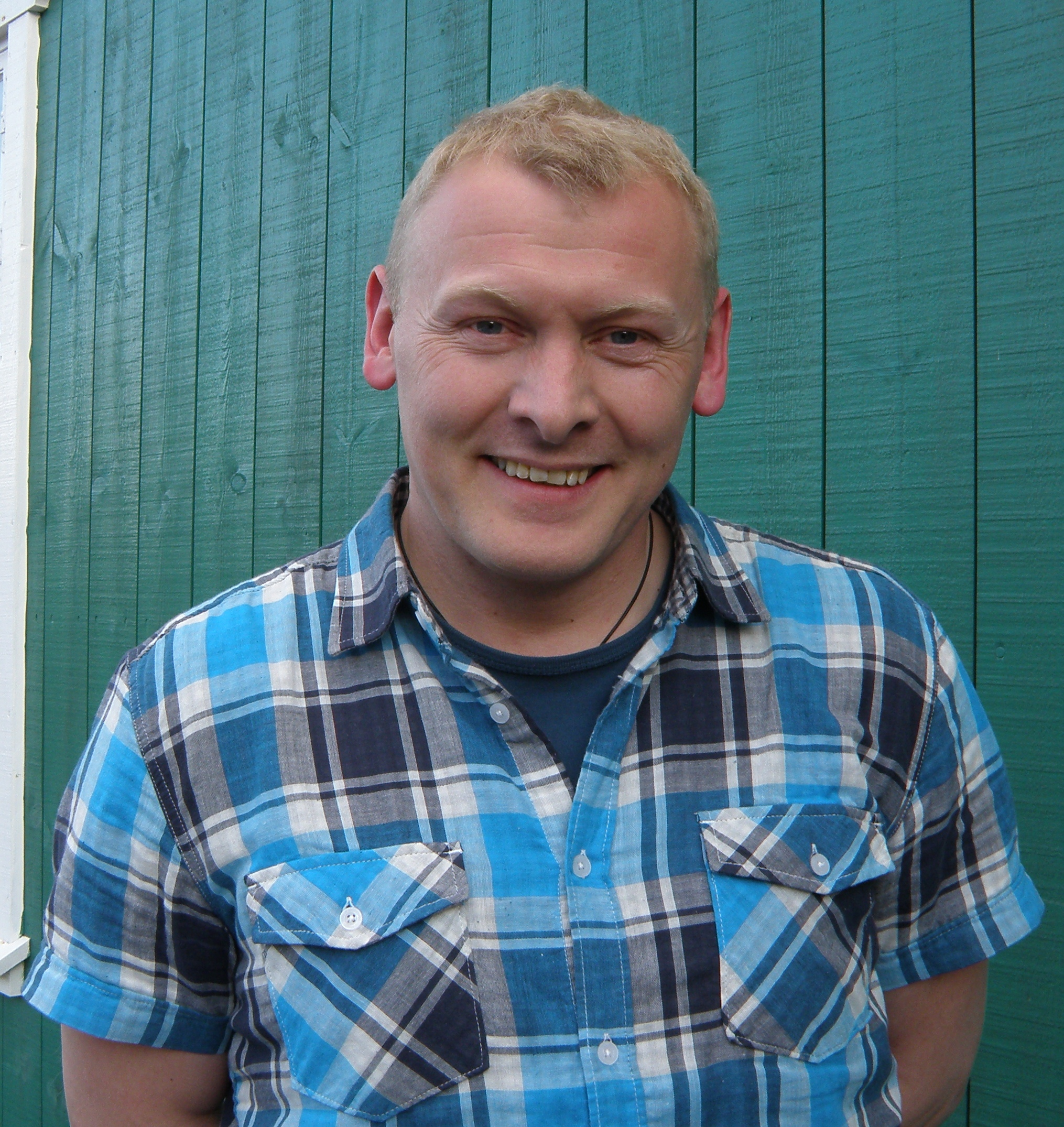
ocean rower Livar Nysted, 2012

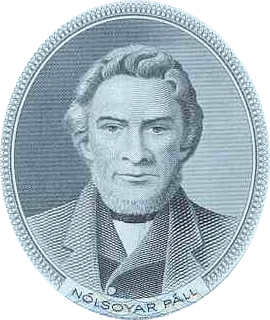
seaman Nólsoyar Páll, 1967

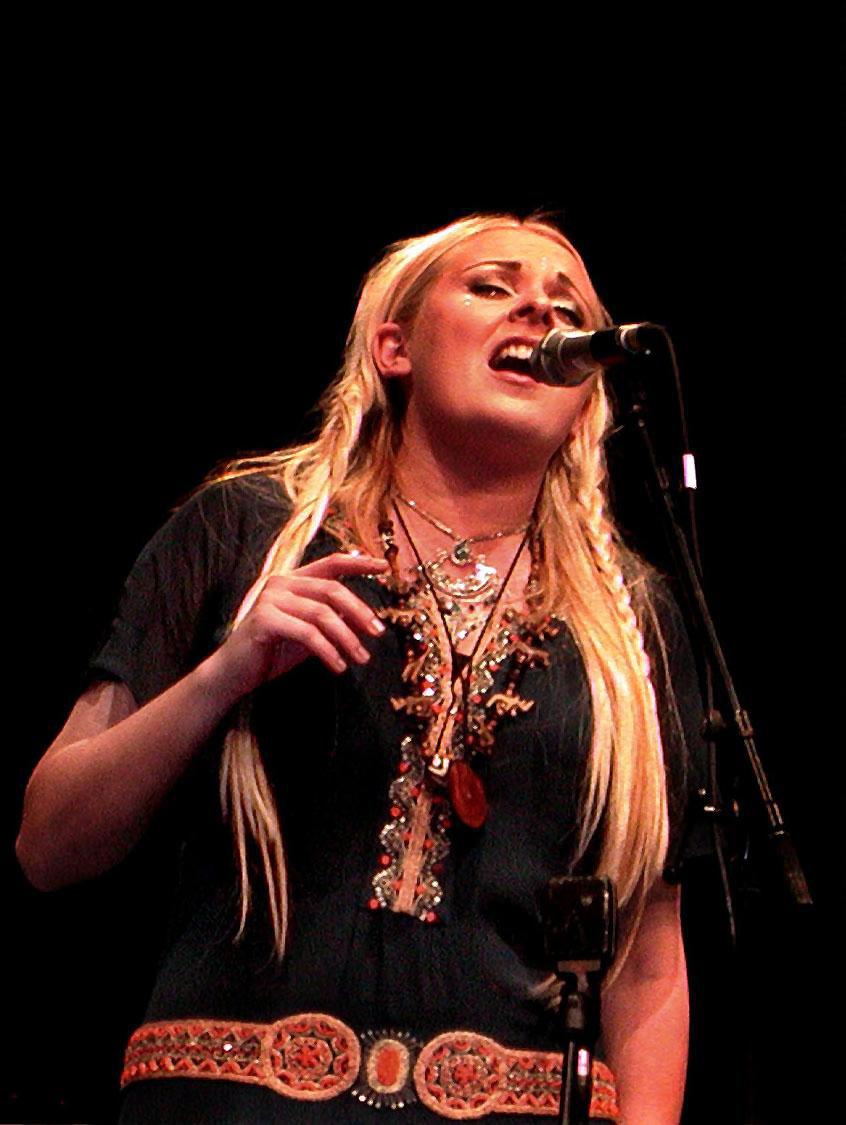
singer Eivør Pálsdóttir, 2005

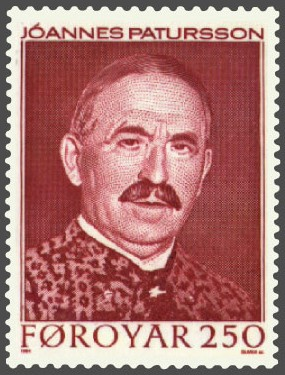
nationalist Jóannes Patursson, 1984

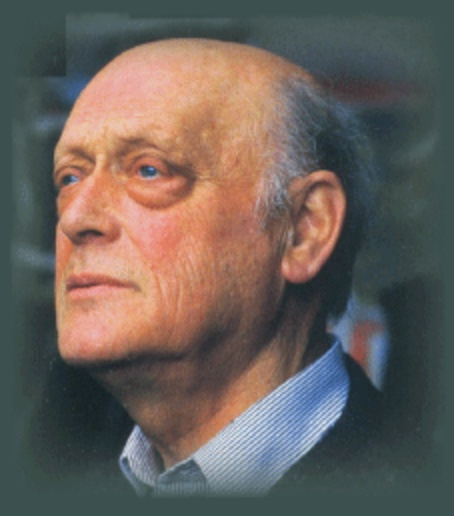
painter Ingálvur av Reyni, 2005

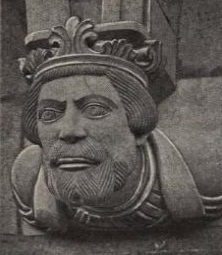
Bust of Sverre Sigurdsson King of Norway, c.1200

== Artists ==
=== Authors and poets ===
- Heðin Brú (1901 – 1987), novelist and translator, pen-name of Hans Jacob Jacobsen
- Marianna Debes Dahl (born 1947), a Faroese writer
- Regin Dahl (1918 – 2007), author and composer
- Joen Danielsen (1843 – 1926), a poet who wrote in the Faroese language.
- Hans Andrias Djurhuus (1883 – 1951), poet and teacher.
- Janus Djurhuus (1881 – 1948), a modern Faroese poet.
- Jens Christian Djurhuus (1773 – 1853), the first poet who wrote in Faroese.
- Bergtóra Hanusardóttir (born 1946), writer and orthodontist
- Jens Pauli Heinesen (1932 − 2011), a Faroese writer.
- William Heinesen (1900 – 1991), a poet, writer, composer and painter
- Guðrið Helmsdal (born 1941). a Faroese poet.
- Rakel Helmsdal (born 1966), author and artist
- Jógvan Isaksen (born 1950), writer and literary historian.
- Jørgen-Frantz Jacobsen (1900 – 1938), a best-seller writer
- Steinbjørn B. Jacobsen (1937 – 2012), poet, teacher and writer.
- Poul F. Joensen (1898 – 1970), poet and writer.
- Sigrið av Skarði Joensen (1908 – 1975), journalist, teacher and feminist.
- Oddvør Johansen (born 1941), writer of novels, short stories and children's books, also an organist.
- Hanus Kamban (born 1942), short story writer, essayist, biographer and poet.
- Sissal Kampmann (born 1974), a Faroese poet.
- Jóanes Nielsen (born 1953), author and poet
- Rói Patursson (born 1947), writer and philosopher.
- Kristian Osvald Viderø (1906 – 1991), Bible translator, clergyman and poet

=== Cinema and theatre artists and film people ===
- Jacob Haugaard (born 1952), actor, comedian, politician, member of the Danish Parliament
- Heiðrikur á Heygum (born 1983), filmmaker, musician and artist
- Olaf Johannessen (born 1961), stage and film actor
- Katrin Ottarsdóttir (born 1957), director
- Helena Patursson (1864–1916), actress, feminist, and writer
- Sakaris Stórá (born 1986), film director and screen-writer
- Hans Tórgarð (born 1969), actor, stage director and playwright

=== Fashion ===
- Liffa Gregoriussen (1904–1992), fashion designer and feminist

=== Musicians ===
- Peter Alberg (1885 – 1940), composer of the Faeroese Anthem
- Lena Anderssen (?), singer-songwriter and guitarist
- Hans Edward Andreassen (born 1983), singer with the rock band The Dreams
- Greta Svabo Bech (born 1987), singer, provided the vocals for deadmau5's track "Raise Your Weapon"
- Kristian Blak (born 1947), composer and musician
- Tróndur Bogason (born 1976), composer and musician
- Boys in a Band (formed 2006), indie rock band from Eysturoy, won 1st place in Global Battle of the Bands
- Rúni Brattaberg (born 1966), opera singer
- The Dreams (2006–2014), Faroese punk/rock/pop band from Tórshavn
- Brandur Enni (born 1989), singer-songwriter, composer and musician
- Bárður Háberg (born 1979), musician, songwriter for pop singers from Japan, Holland, Korea
- Guðrið Hansdóttir (born 1980), singer-songwriter, composer and musician
- Jens Marni Hansen (born 1974), singer-songwriter, rock singer and guitarist
- Jógvan Hansen (born 1978), singer and guitarist, participated in the Icelandic Eurovision Song Contest
- Heiðrikur á Heygum (born 1983), filmmaker, musician, artist and painter
- Heri Joensen (born 1973), vocalist for the folk metal band Týr
- Óli Jógvansson (born 1969), musician, songwriter, composer and producer
- Teitur Lassen (born 1977), singer-songwriter and guitarist
- Høgni Lisberg (born 1982), singer-songwriter
- Dávur Juul Magnussen (born 1986), principal trombonist at the Royal Scottish National Orchestra
- Sissal Jóhanna Norðberg Niclasen (born 1995), known as Sissal, singer, sang for Denmark in the Eurovision Song Contest 2025
- Eivør Pálsdóttir (born 1983), singer-songwriter and guitarist
- Elinborg Pálsdóttir (born 1996), known as Elinborg, singer-songwriter
- Rani Petersen (born 1997), known as Reiley, sang for Denmark at the Eurovision Song Contest 2023
- Sunnleif Rasmussen (born 1961), composer
- Høgni Reistrup (born 1984), singer-songwriter and guitarist
- Evi Tausen (born 1981), country singer

=== Painters, graphical artists and sculptors ===
- Astrid Andreasen (born 1948), textile, scientific and stamp artist
- Aggi Ásgerð Ásgeirsdóttir (born 1966), painter
- Steffan Danielsen (1922 – 1976), painter
- Hans Hansen (1920 – 1970), painter
- Zacharias Heinesen ((born 1936), painter and graphical artist
- Sámal Joensen-Mikines (1906–1979), painter
- Janus Kamban (1913 – 2009), sculptor
- Hans Pauli Olsen (born 1957), sculptor
- Bárður Oskarsson (born 1972), children's writer, illustrator and artist
- Tróndur Patursson (born 1944), painter, glass and iron sculptor, adventurer
- Anker Eli Petersen (born 1959), graphical and stamp artist, songwriter
- Ingálvur av Reyni (1920 – 2005), painter, graphical artist
- Vigdis Sigmundsdóttir (1934 – 2023), painter, artist
- Ruth Smith (1913 – 1958), painter
- Ole Wich (born 1953), conceptuel artist, photographer and graphical artist
- Frida Zachariassen (1912 – 1992), painter, writer

== Leaders and politicians ==
=== Historical ===
- Sigmundur Brestisson (961–1005), Viking age chieftain
- Lucas Debes (1623 – 1675), priest, topographer, conservative rebel
- Floksmen, Faroese rebels in the Middle Ages
- Tróndur í Gøtu (c. 945 – 1035), Viking age chieftain
- Magnus Heinason (1548 – 1589), national hero, naval hero and privateer
- Grímur Kamban (8/9th C - 9/10th C), the first Norse settler in the Faroe Islands.
- Naddoddur (9th C), Viking and settler, discovered Iceland.
- Nólsoyar Páll (1766 – c. 1808), seaman, trader, poet, farmer, boat builder and national hero
- Sverre Sigurðsson (c. 1145/1151 – 1202), King of Norway

=== Modern ===
- Andrea Árting (1891–1988), trade union leader
- Atli Dam (1932–2005), Prime Minister for 16 years, served three times, 1970–1993
- Jóannes Eidesgaard (born 1951), Prime Minister, 2003–2008
- Jona Henriksen (1924–2006), politician, one of the first women to be elected to the Løgting
- Høgni Hoydal (born 1966), Republican leader
- Kaj Leo Johannesen (born 1964), Prime Minister, 2008–2015
- Karin Kjølbro (born 1944), politician, one of the first women elected to the Løgting
- Anfinn Kallsberg (1947–2024), Prime Minister, 1998–2003
- Marita Petersen (1940–2001), Prime Minister, 1993–1994
- Malla Samuelsen (1909–1997), politician, first woman to sit in the Løgting

== Scholars, scientists and academics ==
- Niels Ryberg Finsen (1860 – 1904) , physician, winner of Nobel Prize in Physiology or Medicine in 1903
- Venceslaus Ulricus Hammershaimb (1819 – 1909), a Lutheran minister and philologist
- Jakob Jakobsen (1864 — 1918), linguist, philologist
- Anna Suffía Rasmussen (1876 – 1932), Faroese educator
- Sanna av Skarði (1876 – 1978), Faroese educator
- Símun av Skarði (1872 – 1942), folk high school teacher
- Jens Christian Svabo (1746 – 1824), scientist, philologist

== Explorers and travellers ==
- Magnus Heinason (1548 – 1589), national hero, naval hero and privateer
- Ove Joensen (1948 – 1987), first and only person to row alone from the Faroe Islands to Copenhagen
- Grímur Kamban (8th - 9th C), first settler
- Naddoddur (9th C), explored Iceland
- Livar Nysted (born 1970), crossed the North Atlantic from New York City to Great Britain in a rowboat with four rowers; they broke a 114-year-old world record
- Sigert Patursson (1869 – 1931), traveled to western Siberia and the Kara Sea, Mongolia and Egypt and through Europe
- Tróndur Patursson (born 1944), painter and glass artist, made several adventures with Tim Severin and others, first in 1976
- Inger Klein Thorhauge (?), cruise ship Captain with Cunard Line

== Clergymen ==
- Jákup Dahl (1878 – 1944), Provost and Bible translator
- Daniel Jacob Danielsen (1871 – 1916), missionary and humanitarian worker
- Lucas Debes (1623 – 1675), conservative rebel
- Venceslaus Ulricus Hammershaimb (1819 – 1909), Lutheran minister who established the modern orthography of Faroese

== Athletes ==
- Rannvá Andreasen (born 1980), football player
- Heidi Andreasen (born 1985), swimmer, three-time silver medallist and two-time bronze medallist Paralympian
- Ove Joensen (1948–1987), rowing legend
- Pál Joensen (born 1990), swimmer, triple European Junior Champion in 2008; gold winner in 1500m freestyle at the FINA World Cup in 2009
- Ásla Johannesen (born 1996), football player
- Todi Jónsson (born 1972), former FC Copenhagen professional football player
- Bára Klakstein (born 1973), football player (defender) and coach
- Jens Martin Knudsen (born 1967), football goalkeeper
- Arnborg Lervig (born 1997), football player
- Gunnar Nielsen (born 1986), goalkeeper, first Faroese footballer to play in the Premier League
- Sverri Sandberg Nielsen (born 1993), rower, mainly competes in the heavyweight single sculls.
- Livar Nysted (born 1970), an ocean rower and painter, he crossed the North Atlantic in a rowboat together with three others, setting a new world record
- Bjørk Herup Olsen (born 1991), middle- and long-distance runner, Danish Junior Champion
- Laila Pætursdóttir (born 1990), football player
- Lív Poulsen (born 1997), football player
- Gilli Rólantsson (born 1992), football player
- Johan Sundstein (born 1993), professional eSportsman (Dota 2), 2x International Champion, 6x Major Champion.
- Alex Troleis (born 1979 or 1980), football referee.
- Regin Vágadal (born 1970), strongman

== Chess players ==
- Helgi Dam Ziska (born 1990), top ranked and the highest ever rated player from his country, and has been rated number one amongst Faroese chess players since the age of 16. He is the first Faroese player to qualify for the Grandmaster title.

== See also ==
- List of people on stamps of the Faroe Islands
- List of people by nationality
