= List of people on the postage stamps of the Faroe Islands =

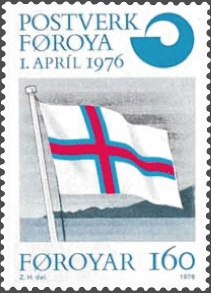

List of people on the postage stamps of the Faroe Islands reflects people of importance to the history and society of Faroe Islands. The Postverk Føroya have chosen an issuing policy where stamp designs are relevant to the islands themselves. The Faroese government uses stamps to build a profile of the country's history, culture, nature and economy.

The Faroe Isles issued their first stamps on January 30, 1975. As the isles are an independent part of Denmark, Danish stamps were used on the isles previous to this date. From a philatelic point of view, there are earlier events of interest in the postal history of the Faroe Islands, but their first stamps came in 1975.

== List of people ==
| Year | Name | Profession | Stamp |
|---|---|---|---|
| 1980 | Jakob Jakobsen | Linguist, son of Hans N. mentioned below | |
| 1980 | V. U. Hammershaimb | Linguist | |
| 1983 | Alexander Fleming | British physician, Nobel laureate | |
| 1983 | Niels Ryberg Finsen | Physician, Nobel laureate | |
| 1984 | Hans Andrias Djurhuus | Author | |
| 1984 | Janus Djurhuus | Author | |
| 1984 | Jóannes Patursson | Author and Independence campaigner, Christmas Meeting of 1888, brother of Sverri | |
| 1984 | Sverri Patursson | Author, brother of Jóannes | |
| 1985 | Ruth Smith | Painter (self portrait) | |
| 1988 | Christian Ludvig Johannesen | Independence campaigner, Christmas Meeting of 1888 | |
| 1988 | Christian Matras | Author | |
| 1988 | Djóni í Geil | Independence campaigner, Christmas Meeting of 1888 | |
| 1988 | Enok Bærentsen | Independence campaigner, Christmas Meeting of 1888 | |
| 1988 | Hans Nicolai Jacobsen | Book seller and Independence campaigner, Christmas Meeting of 1888, father to Jakob, mentioned above | |
| 1988 | Heðin Brú | Author | |
| 1988 | Jens Olsen | Independence campaigner, Christmas Meeting of 1888 | |
| 1988 | Just á Húsum | Independence campaigner, Christmas Meeting of 1888 | |
| 1988 | Jørgen-Frantz Jacobsen | Author | |
| 1988 | Rasmus Christoffer Effersøe | Independence campaigner, Christmas Meeting of 1888 | |
| 1988 | Sámal F. Samuelsen | Independence campaigner, Christmas Meeting of 1888 | |
| 1988 | Jóannes Patursson | Independence campaigner, Christmas Meeting of 1888 (for the second time) | |
| 1988 | William Heinesen | Novelist, artist | |
| 1992 | Christopher Columbus | Italian explorer | |
| 1992 | Leiv Eiriksson | Icelandic explorer | |
| 1994 | Brendan | Irish medieval saint and discoverer | |
| 1995 | Frimod Joensen | Painter (selfportrait) | |
| 1995 | Olaf II of Norway | Norwegian king | |
| 1997 | Anneke von der Lippe | Norwegian actor from the movie Barbara | |
| 1997 | Margrethe II of Denmark | Queen of Denmark | |
| 1998 | Hans Hansen | Painter (Self-portrait) | |
| 2000 | Anna Suffía Rasmussen | Folk high school pioneer | |
| 2000 | Rasmus Rasmussen | Folk high school pioneer and author married to Anna above | |
| 2000 | Sanna av Skarði | Folk high school pioneer | |
| 2000 | Símun av Skarði | Folk high school pioneer and author, married to Sanna above | |
| 2000 | Sigmundur Brestisson | Introduced Christianity to the Faroes according to Færeyinga saga | |
| 2000 | Tróndur í Gøtu | Person from Færeyinga Saga | |
| 2003 | Jesper Rasmussen Brochmand | Danish bishop and author of prayer book | |
| 2003 | Thomas Kingo | Danish priest and poet | |
| 2004 | Frederik, Crown Prince of Denmark | Crown Prince of Denmark | |
| 2004 | Grímur Kamban | First man on Faroe Islands according to Færeyinga Saga | |
| 2004 | Mary, Crown Princess of Denmark | Crown Princess of Denmark | |
| 2004 | Nólsoyar Páll | National hero | |
| 2004 | Tróndur í Gøtu | Person from Færeyinga Saga (2nd time) | |
| 2006 | Olaf I of Norway | Norwegian king; appearing in the ballad Ormen Lange | |
| 2006 | Einar Tambarskjelve | Norwegian Viking hero; appearing in the ballad Ormen Lange | |
| 2007 | Jákup Dahl | Clergyman and Bible translator | |
| 2007 | Kristian Osvald Viderø | Clergyman and Bible translator | |
| 2007 | Victor Danielsen | Baptist pastor, and Bible translator | |
| 2008 | Niels Christopher Winther | Lawyer, politician and editor | |
| 2008 | Súsanna Helena Patursson | Author, editor, feminist | |
| 2008 | Rasmus C. Effersøe | Independence campaigner, editor, poet | |
| 2008 | Jógvan Poulsen | Teacher, author, politician | |
| 2008 | Fríðrikur Petersen | Clergyman and author | |
| 2008 | Andrias Christian Evensen | Clergyman and author | |
| 2010 | Jens Christian Svabo | Linguist | |
| 2011 | Emmeline Pankhurst | British suffragette | |
| 2011 | Clara Zetkin | German suffragette | |
| 2011 | Emma Wiberg and Astrid av Rógvu | Midwives | |
| 2011 | Elsebeth Fr. Malena Johansen, Oluffa Bærentsen, Petra O. J. F. Hansen | Nurses | |
| 2011 | Annika í Dímun | 17th century legendary character | |
| 2012 | Margrethe II | Queen of Denmark and Faroe Isles | |
| 2013 | Søren Aabye Kierkegaard | Danish theologian and philosopher | |
| 2014 | Christian Petersen | Faroese-Canadian soldier of WW1 | |
| 2014 | Daniel Jacob Danielsen | Missionary to Congo | |
| 2014 | Vilhelm Reinert-Joensen | Faoese-U.S. naval officer of WW2 | |
| 2014 | Henrik | Prince Consort of Denmark | |
| 2017 | Martin Luther | Reformator | |
| 2017 | Margrethe II og prince Henrik | Queen of Denmark and Faroe Isles | |
| 2017 | Princess of Nólsoy | Legendary person | |
| 2018 | Regin Dahl | Composer | |
| 2018 | Hans Christopher Müller | Merchant and politician | |
| 2018 | Helena Patursson et al. | Actor and feminist, Actors' Association 100 Years themed | |
| 2019 | Elinborg Lützen | Artist | |
| 2019 | V.U. Hammershaimb | Linguist | |
| 2019 | Edward Fuglø | Artist, self portrait as child in 1969, Apollo 11 themed | |
| 2020 | Mikkjal á Ryggi | Teacher, author and politician | |
| 2020 | Margrethe II | Queen of Denmark and Faroe Isles | |
| 2020 | Ludwig van Beethoven | Composer | |
| 2021 | Christian X of Denmark | King of Denmark and Faroe Isles, 1921 visit themed | |
| 2021 | Czesław Słania | Stamp artist | |
| 2022 | Símun í Vági | Baker and brewer | |
| 2022 | Margrethe II | Queen of Denmark and Faroe Isles | |
| 2022 | Andrea Árting | Labour organization chairwoman | |

== Sources ==
- Stamps by year, Posta Faroe Islands
- Famous people on stamps of the Faroe Islands sorted by year, colnect.com
