= Gazet Patursson =

Faroese gardener and biologist

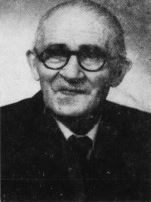
Gazet Patursson

Olaf Gazet Patursson (July 6, 1879 – May 2, 1970) was a Faroese gardener and biologist.

Gazet Patursson was born in Kirkjubøur, the son of Poul Peder Pedersen (a.k.a. Páll Patursson), a holder of publicly owned land (Faroese: kongsbóndi), and Ellen Cathrine (née Djonesen). He was the youngest of the Patursson children, and his siblings Helena, Jóannes, Sverri, Sigert, and Petur were all prominent figures in Faroese society. Although overshadowed by some of his other siblings, Gazet established a reputation as a pioneer in horticulture in the Faroe Islands, specializing in botany and entomology. He established a number of Faroese plant name together with Rasmus Rasmussen. Although Patursson left much written material behind, most biographical accounts of him are based on the obituary that Niels Winther Poulsen wrote for him.

The Patursson siblings were home schooled by Joen Hans Jacob Petersen, the brother of Fríðrikur Petersen. After this, he attended high school in Tórshavn. He also studied together with his brother Jóannes Patursson at the agricultural college in Kirkjubøur, and later at Askov High School and the Royal Veterinary and Agricultural University in Denmark, but illness prevented him from completing his studies there. He also studied at the Stend Secondary School outside of Bergen and at the Grude botany school in Jæren, where he received his vocational training as a gardener. After returning to Kirkjubøur, soon after the First World War he was the first in the Faroe Islands to engage in horticulture as his primary activity.

In contrast to the rest of his siblings, who were all politically active in the Home Rule Party, Gazet Patursson openly sided with the Social Democratic Party and was a personal friend of the party's leader for many years, Peter Mohr Dam. However, Gazet Patursson was never politically active, neither in the party organization nor as an elected official.
