= Sigrið av Skarði Joensen =

- Born: Sigrið av Skarði; May 12, 1908; Klaksvík, Faroe Islands
- Died: July 3, 1975 (aged 67); Tórshavn, Faroe Islands
- Occupations: Journalist, teacher
- Political party: Republic
- Spouse: Sigurð Joensen

Sigrið av Skarði Joensen, also Sigrið av Skarði, (May 12, 1908 – July 3, 1975) was a Faroese journalist, teacher, and feminist.

== Early life and education ==
Sigrið av Skarði Joensen was born in Fagralíð, Klaksvík in 1908, the daughter of Símun av Skarði (1872–1942) and Súsanna Kathrina Jacobsen (1876–1978). Both of her parents taught at the Faroese Folk High School (Faroese: Føroya Fólkaháskúli), which at that time was located between Fagralíð and Klaksvík. In 1909 the school was relocated to Tórshavn and the family followed. Her paternal aunt was educator Anna Suffía Rasmussen who was married to fellow teacher at the school, Rasmus Rasmussen.

After receiving her examen artium in Denmark in 1927, Sigrið av Skarði studied history and English at the University of Copenhagen. Although she interrupted her studies, she started teaching these subjects in 1941.

== Career ==
She also became engaged in journalism early on. She wrote an article about the anarchists Sacco and Vanzetti, who were executed in the United States in 1927, and it was published in the newspaper Føroya Social Demokrat (The Faroes Social Democrat). She was also active in the Faroese language conflict and published an article about it in 1938. The conflict was resolved soon thereafter in favor of the Faroese language.

During the Second World War, contact was broken off between German-occupied Denmark and the British-occupied Faroe Islands. Many Faroese (mostly young students) were unable to return to their homeland and remained in Denmark for the rest of the war, even if they had completed their studies. Sigrið and her husband Sigurð were active in the Faroese Society (Faroese: Føroyingafelagið) in Copenhagen and in the Faroese student union. The Faroese-language newspaper Búgvin (Ready) was published from 1941 to 1946, and Sigrið wrote articles on history and current events for the paper. She also occasionally did translations, and she translated Sigert Patursson's reports of a trip to Siberia in 1901.

The family relocated to the Faroe Islands in 1948, and Sigrið av Skarði Joensen established her publishing house Ungu Føroyar. She was among the founders of the Faorese Women's Society (Faroese: Kvinnufelagið), building on the ideas of Helena Patursson. Sigrið also served as the editor of the newspaper Kvinnutíðindi (Women's News) until 1959. In the 1950s, Sigrið arranged literature and language courses for middle-aged women. She taught Latin at the lower secondary school in Tórshavn, and a singing school was established at her initiative based on her interest in Faroese folk dance and folk song. Her husband Sigurð was a politician for the Faroese Republican Party (Faroese: Tjóðveldisflokkurin) and served several terms in the Tórshavn city government and Faroese Parliament. Sigrið also ran for office, and she served on the youth council for many years.

== Personal life ==
In 1938, she married the politician Sigurð Joensen (1911–1993), with whom she had seven children: Elspa (born 1939), Lív (1942), Búgvi (1945), Turið (1946), Sjúrður (1947), Bergljót (1950), and Inga Rósa (1953).

Sigrið av Skarði Joensen died in Tórshavn.
