= Faroese =

Faroese (/ˌfɛəroʊˈiːz, ˌfær-/ FAIR-oh-EEZ, FARR-) or Faroish (/ˈfɛəroʊɪʃ, ˈfær-/ FAIR-oh-ish, FARR-) may refer to:

- Something of, from, or related to Faroe Islands
  - Faroese language
  - Faroe Islanders
