= Gjógv =

- Village
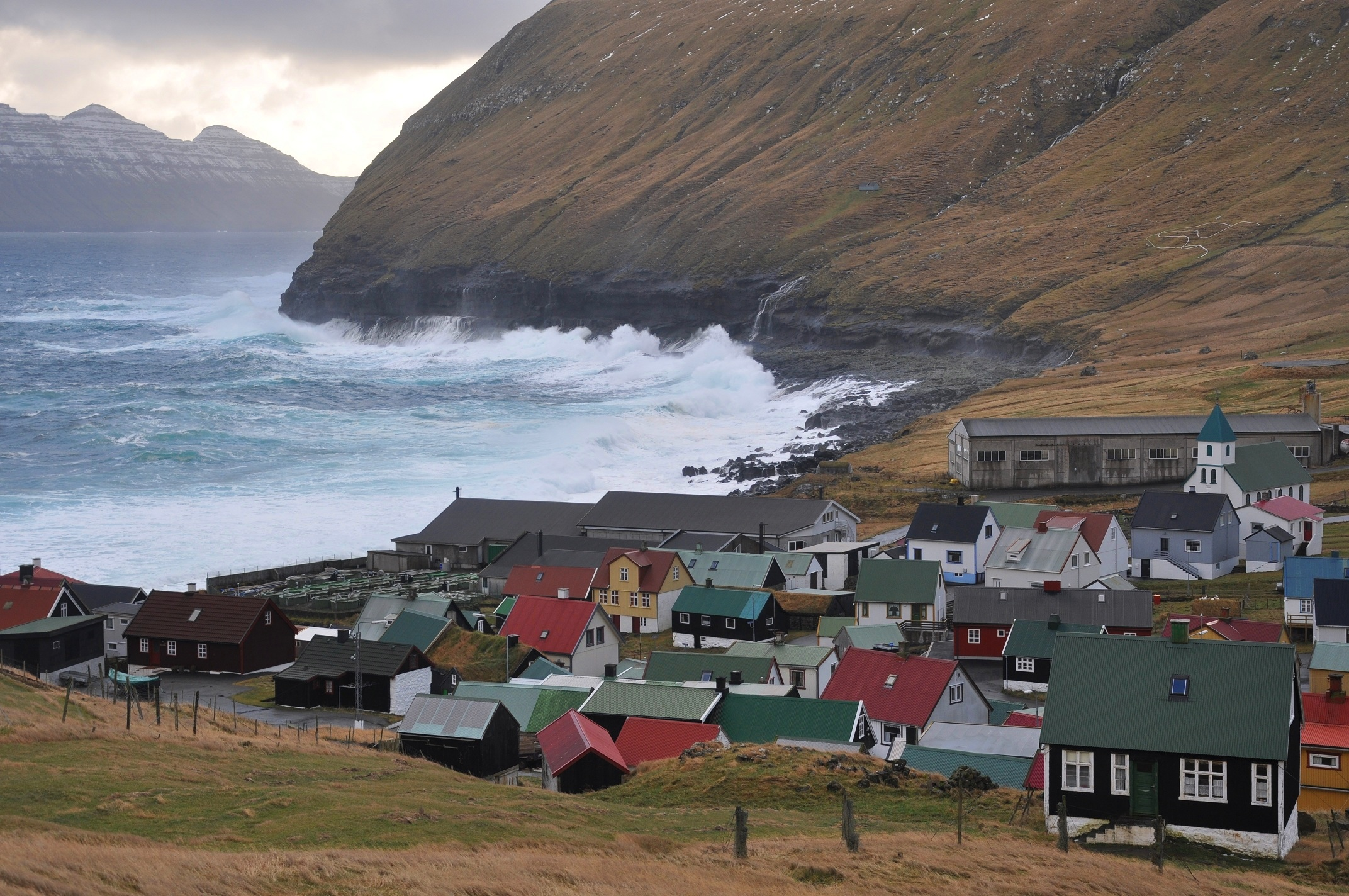
- Gjógv (2010)

- Location in the Faroe Islands
- Coordinates: 62°19′30″N 6°56′28″W
- State: Kingdom of Denmark
- Constituent country: Faroe Islands
- Island: Eysturoy
- Municipality: Sunda
- Established: 9th century

Population (29 April 2025)
  - Total: 19
- Time zone: GMT
  - Summer (DST): UTC+1 (EST)
- Postal code: FO 476
- Climate: Cfc

Gjógv (pronounced [tʃɛkv], literally: gorge, geo) is a village located on the northeast tip of the island of Eysturoy, in the Faroe Islands and 63 km (39 mi) north by road from the capital of Tórshavn.

The village was named after a 200-metre (650 ft) long sea-filled gorge that runs north to the sea from the village.

== History ==
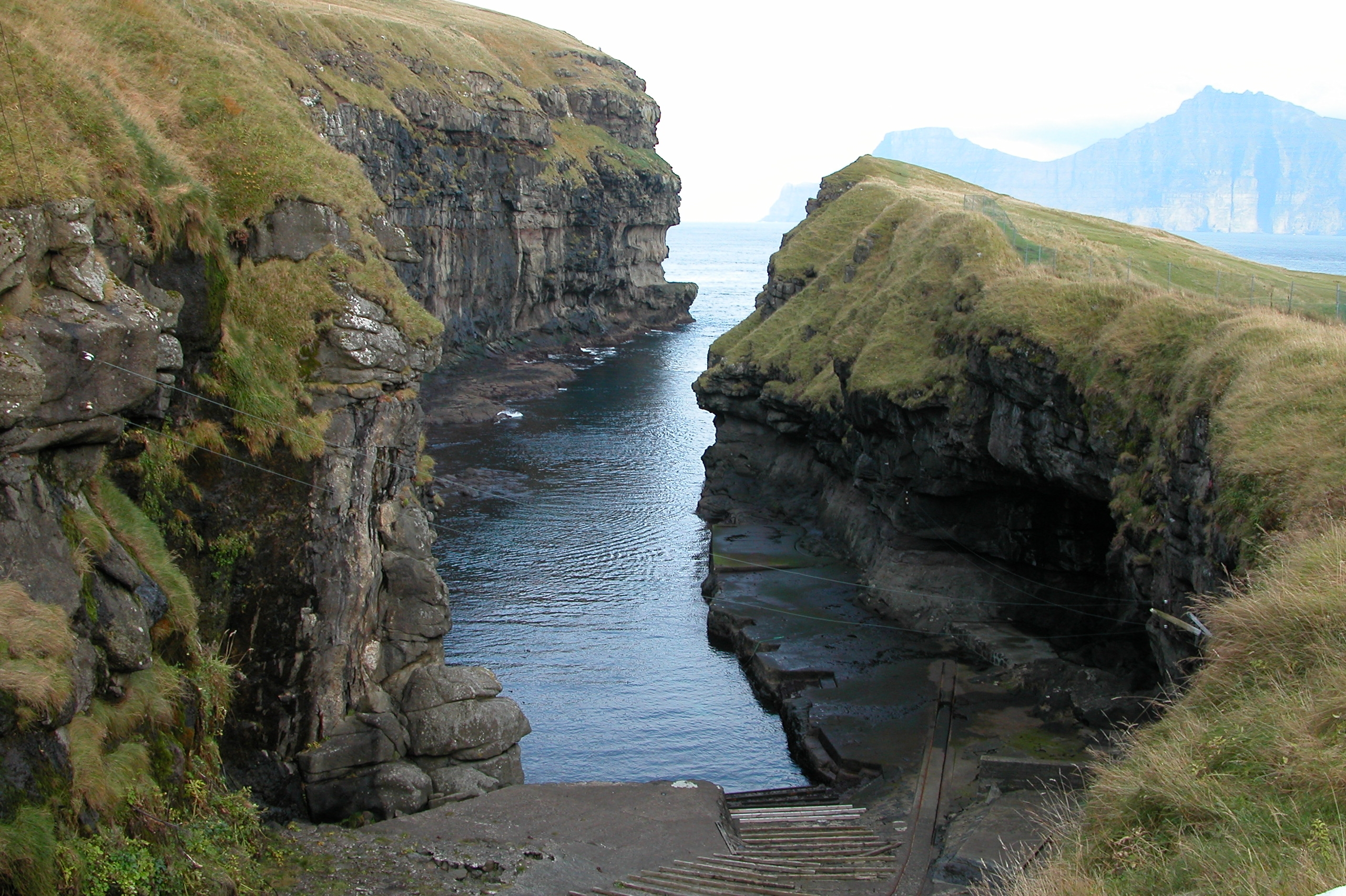
The gorge is the natural harbour of Gjógv.

The village was first mentioned in 1584, but it seems to have existed long before then. It has long subsisted on fishing and selling dried and salted fish (klippfiskur in Faroese). At one time as many as 13 fishing boats sailed from Gjógv. Its population has seen a sharp decline in the past 60 years or so. In 1950 the headcount still stood at 210. A factory producing prefabricated concrete elements was founded in the village in 1982. It employs 6 people and is the only one of its kind in the islands. Other branches of industry are represented by the village's fish farm and guest house / hostel and campsite.

== Sights ==
The village church dates from 1929. It was the first one to be consecrated in the village and the first one to feature services in Faroese. Before that, the villagers walked to Funningur for church and burial services. On the opposite side of the road a sculpture stands as a memorial to fishermen lost at sea, bearing the names and ages of men from the late nineteenth to the mid twentieth century. The sculpture of a mother and two children looking out to sea was created by Fritjof Joensen.

The village school building dates back to 1884. It was built from boulders and was once in use by as many as 50 pupils. Now there are only three. The old village dance hall was renovated and extended in 1986 and now houses a community centre. All houses in the village conform to the prevailing colourful style of building in the Faroes, red, white and green being the predominant colours used. There are still about 50 houses left in the village. Due to the great decrease in population, about half of that number stand empty.

The nearest grocery store is at Eiði, but Gjógv has a post office in a private home, which opens five days a week for 30 minutes each morning and afternoon. There is also a helicopter pad in the village, used mainly for emergency ambulance service or sea-rescue operations.

Gjógv has one of the natural harbours in the Faroes. However, boats need to be pulled up on a ramp to be safe from the surf. To tourists and boating natives alike, the harbour in the gorge is also a well-known site of outstanding natural scenery. The village gets its name from the gorge, Faroese gjógv is derived from the same Norse word (gjó) as the Shetland dialect geo. The inhabitants are known as Gjáarfólk, possibly related to the Icelandic word gjá which itself comes from the Old Norse gjó from which the village name is derived.

Danish crown prince Frederik and Crown Princess Mary visited Gjógv on 22 June 2005. Two elderly inhabitants had the idea of placing a bench with views along the gorge towards the sea. The bench was named 'Mary's bench' (proclaimed by a brass plaque attached to it) and the Crown Princess subsequently became the first to be seated on it. They were also serenaded by Faroese opera singer Rúni Brattaberg on this occasion.

== Gjógv incline railway ==
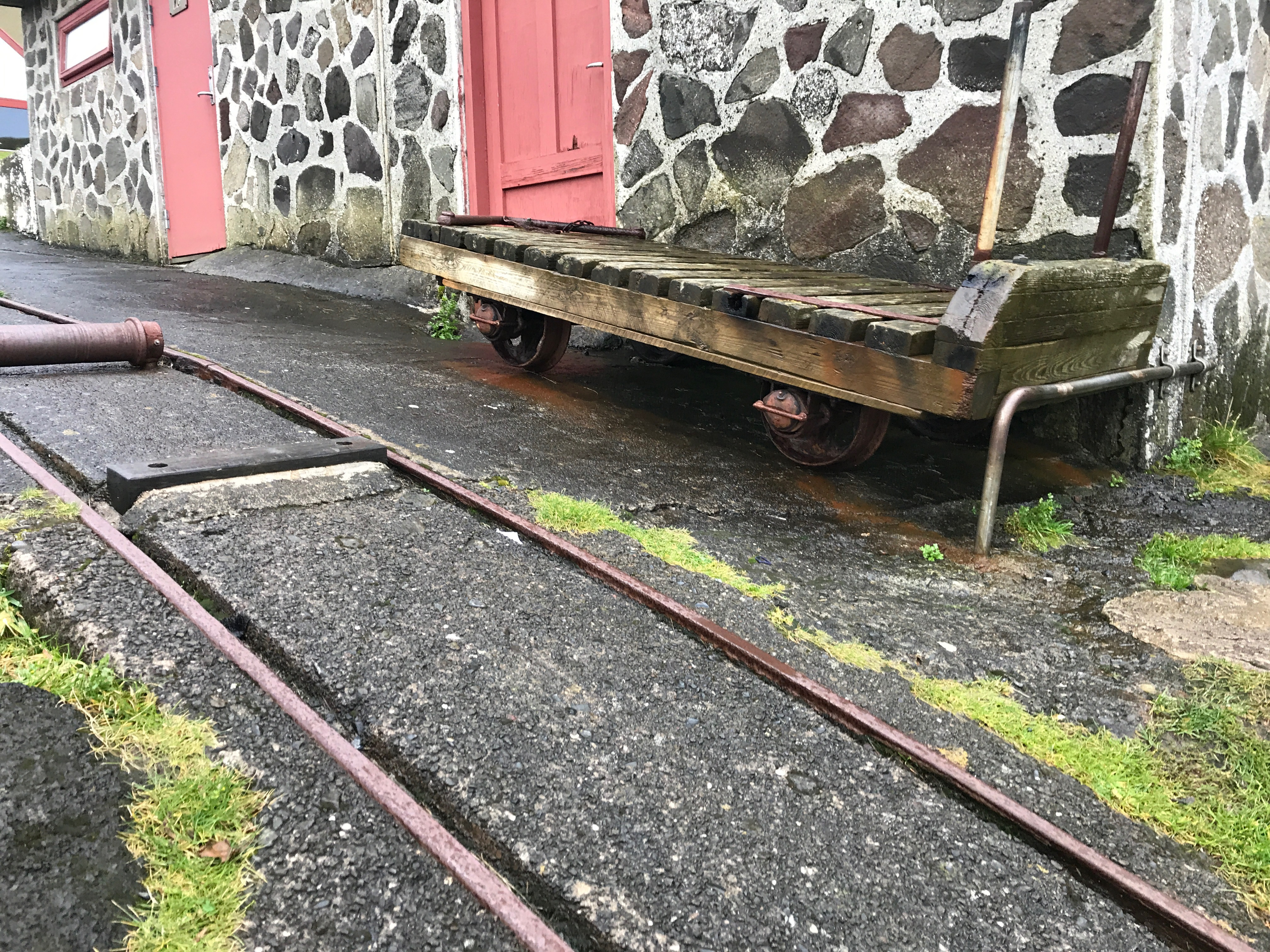
Track, wagon, and winch house of the Gjógv incline railway.

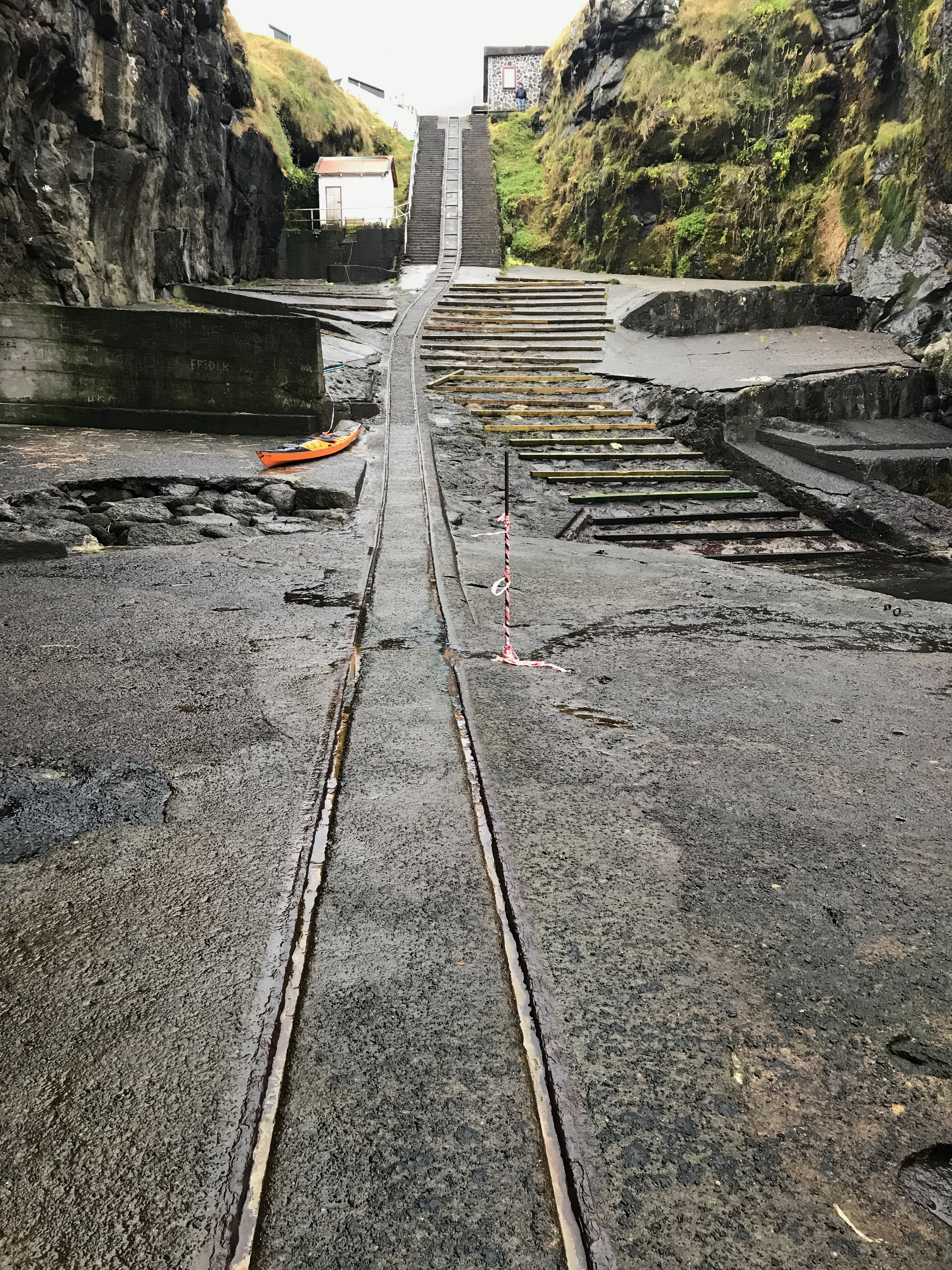
View along the railway line from the harbour.

The Gjógv incline railway is notable as the only operating railway in the Faroe Islands. Transport in the Faroe Islands has to engage with the undulating (and often mountainous) terrain, and the large number of bodies of water (mostly fjords and sea channels, but also lakes), all of which makes rail transport difficult to achieve.

The incline railway operates a narrow-gauge line from the low-level harbour inside the gorge, up a steep incline to the boathouses of the upper village. The line terminates just in front of the village coffee house (Gjáarkaffi). There are no locomotives, and motive power is provided by a winch operating a rope which is attached to the goods wagons. Although the railway is designed for freight transportation, it is a common sight to see local people riding on the wagons with the freight. The winch house is located at the top of the incline, overlooking the gorge. The rope passes from the winch house to the pivot through an underground channel, the route of which may be observed as a series of metal plates set into the road surface. From the pivot onwards the rope is attached to the wagons, and on the incline section of the line it passes over rollers set centrally between the rails of the permanent way.

The incline railway was installed to transport goods offloaded from boats, at a time when road transport of commodities was difficult and unreliable, and most items arrived in the village by sea. Today delivery lorries come to the village to supply the hotel, the post office, and the coffee shop, and use of the incline railway has consequently declined. It remains serviceable, still transporting goods, and sometimes also small boats.

== Surroundings ==
A number of tracks head up into the uplands north and west of the village. The highest peaks between Gjógv and the neighbouring village of Eiði are Slættaratindur (882 m, 2,894 ft) and Gráfelli (857 m, 2,812 ft). The valley of Ambadalur is located just northwest of Gjógv. Just off the coast at Ambadalur the highest free-standing sea-stack in the Faroes is to be found. It reaches up to an astounding 188 metres (617 ft). Locally known as Búgvin, it offers a safe perch for multitudes of seabirds. The peaks of Tyril and Middagsfjall (601 m, 1,972 ft) are found east of Gjógv. Both peaks offer a phenomenal view of Funningsfjørður (Funningur's Fjord).

== Gjógv visiting painters ==
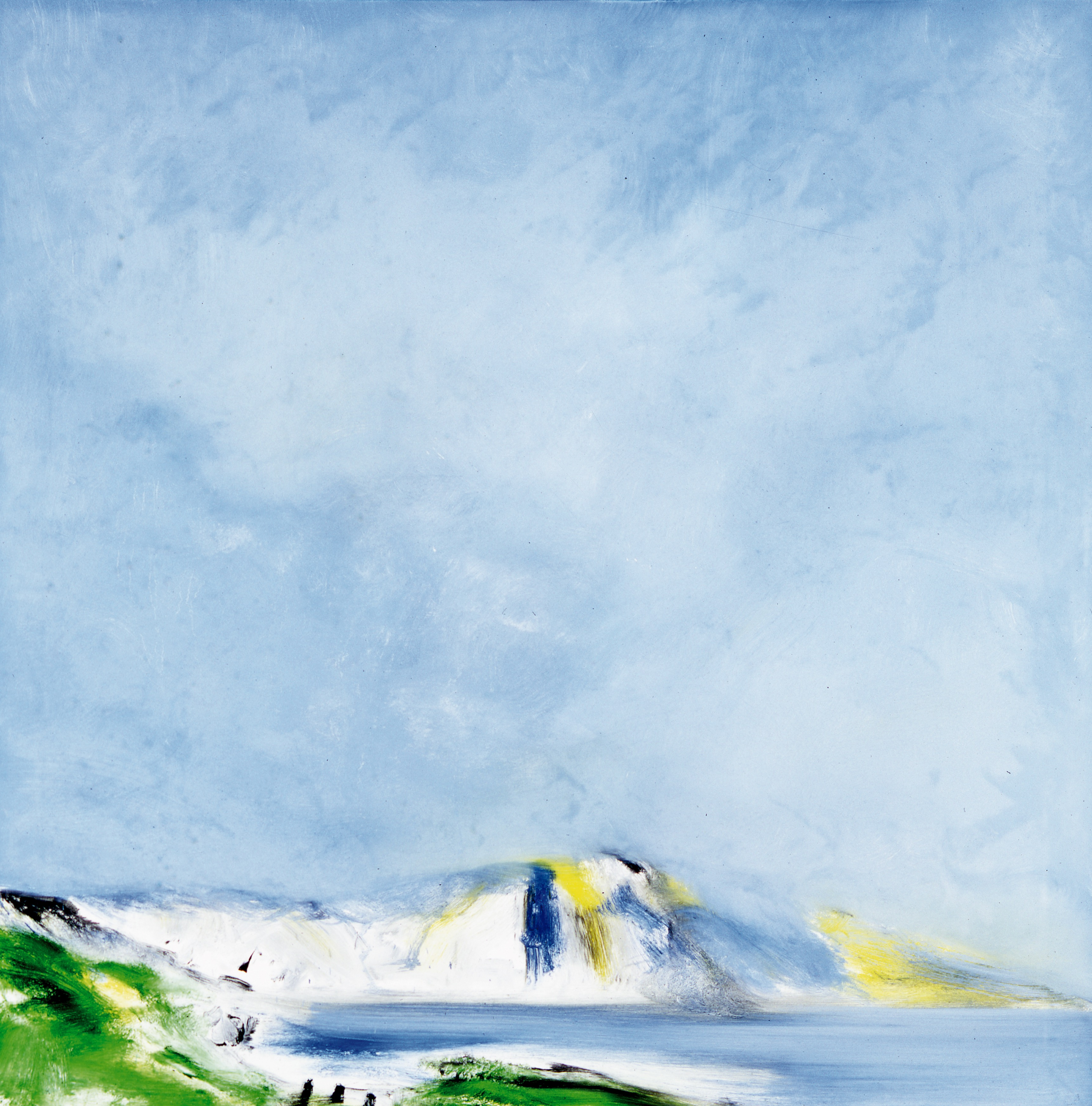
"Faröer II", Oil painting by Ingo Kühl.

In 1995 the german artist Ingo Kühl painted watercolors in Gjógv, after which the nine-part Faroe Islands picture cycle was created, which was exhibited in the Royal Danish Embassy in Berlin in 2003/2004.

== Noted natives and residents ==
- Joen Danielsen (1843–1926) poet
- Hans Jacob Debes (1940–2003), historian.
- Hans Jacob Joensen (1938–present), first (modern era) Bishop of the Faroe Islands.
- Sigurð Joensen (1911–1993), lawyer, author, politician.
- Kristin Hervør Lützen, actress

== Gallery ==
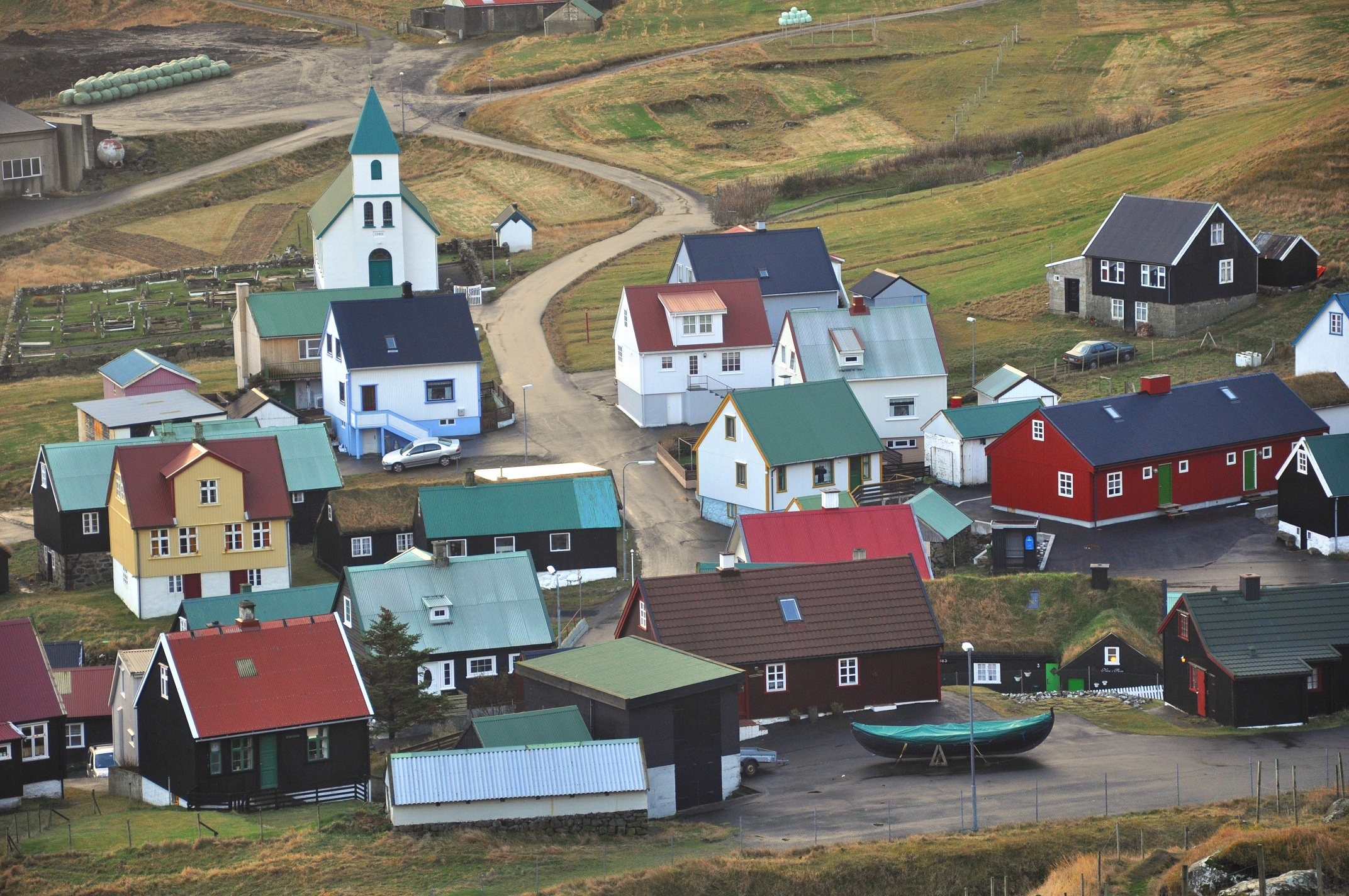
Village centre

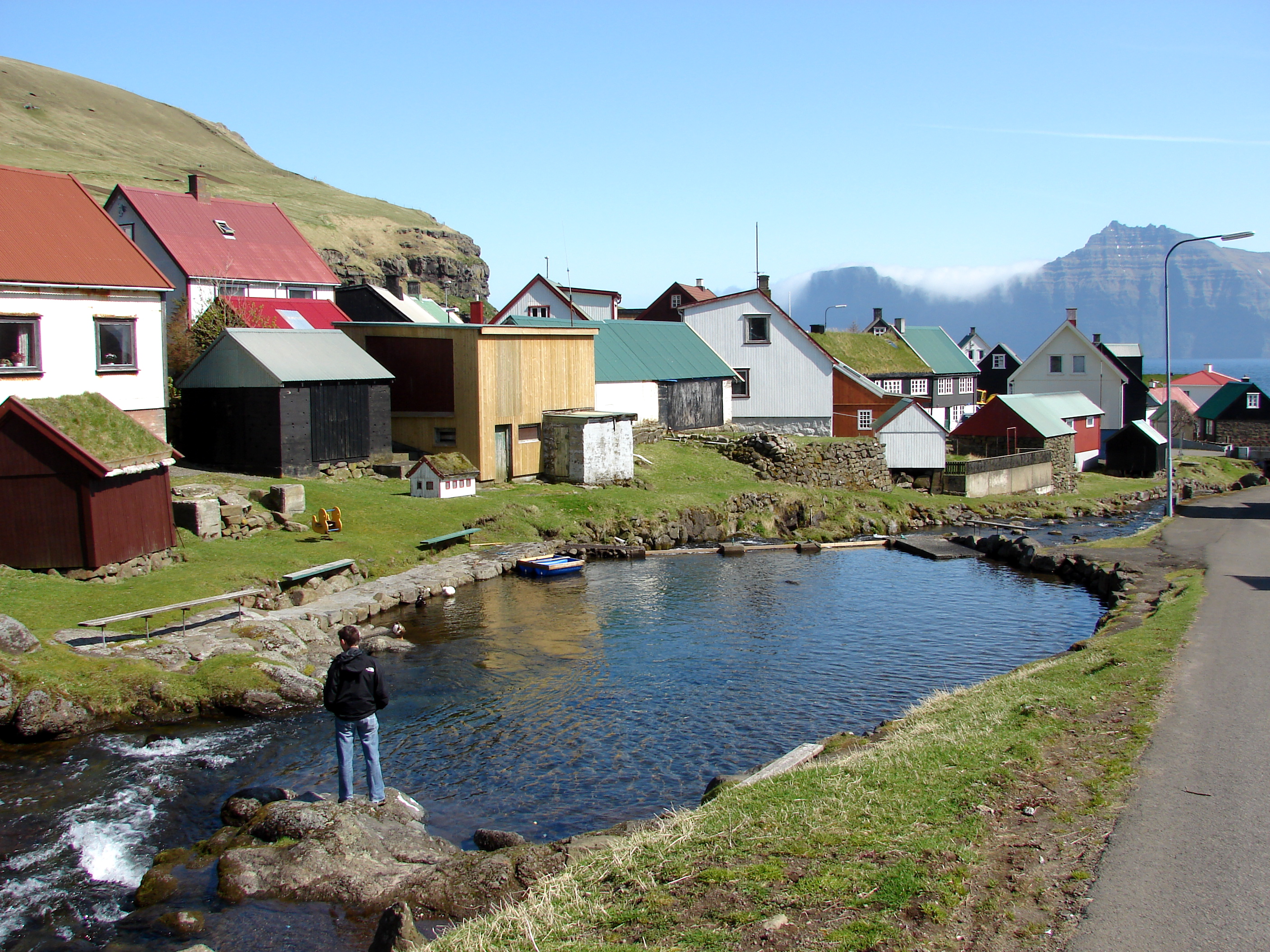
Gjógv in spring

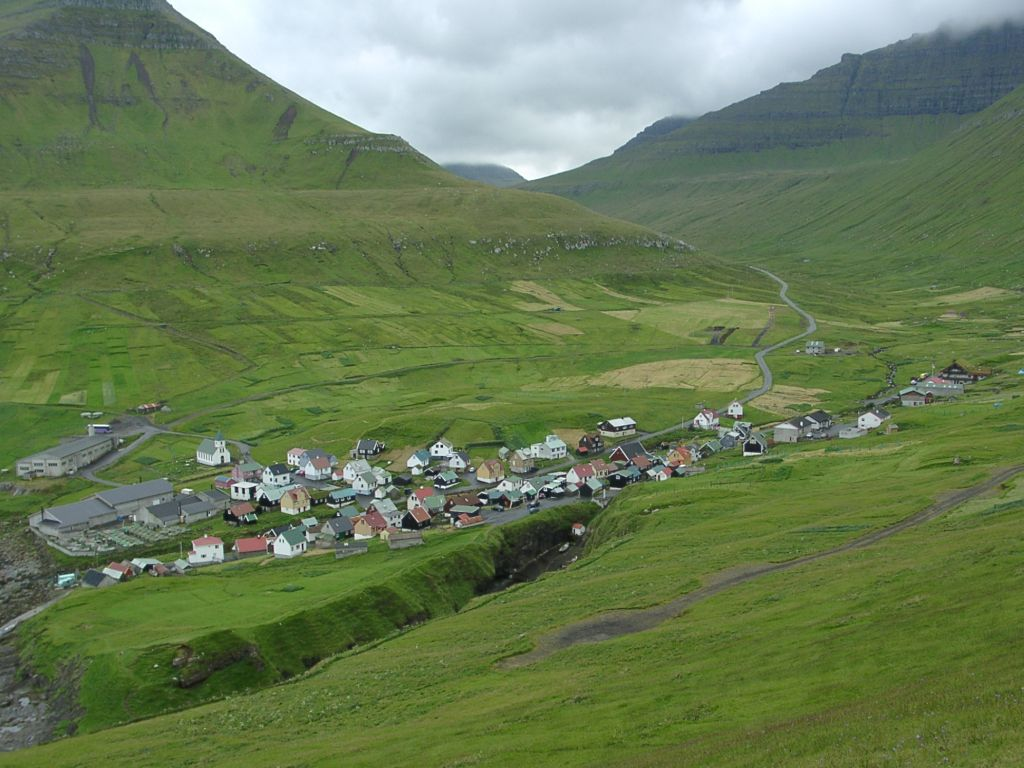
Gjógv in its natural setting

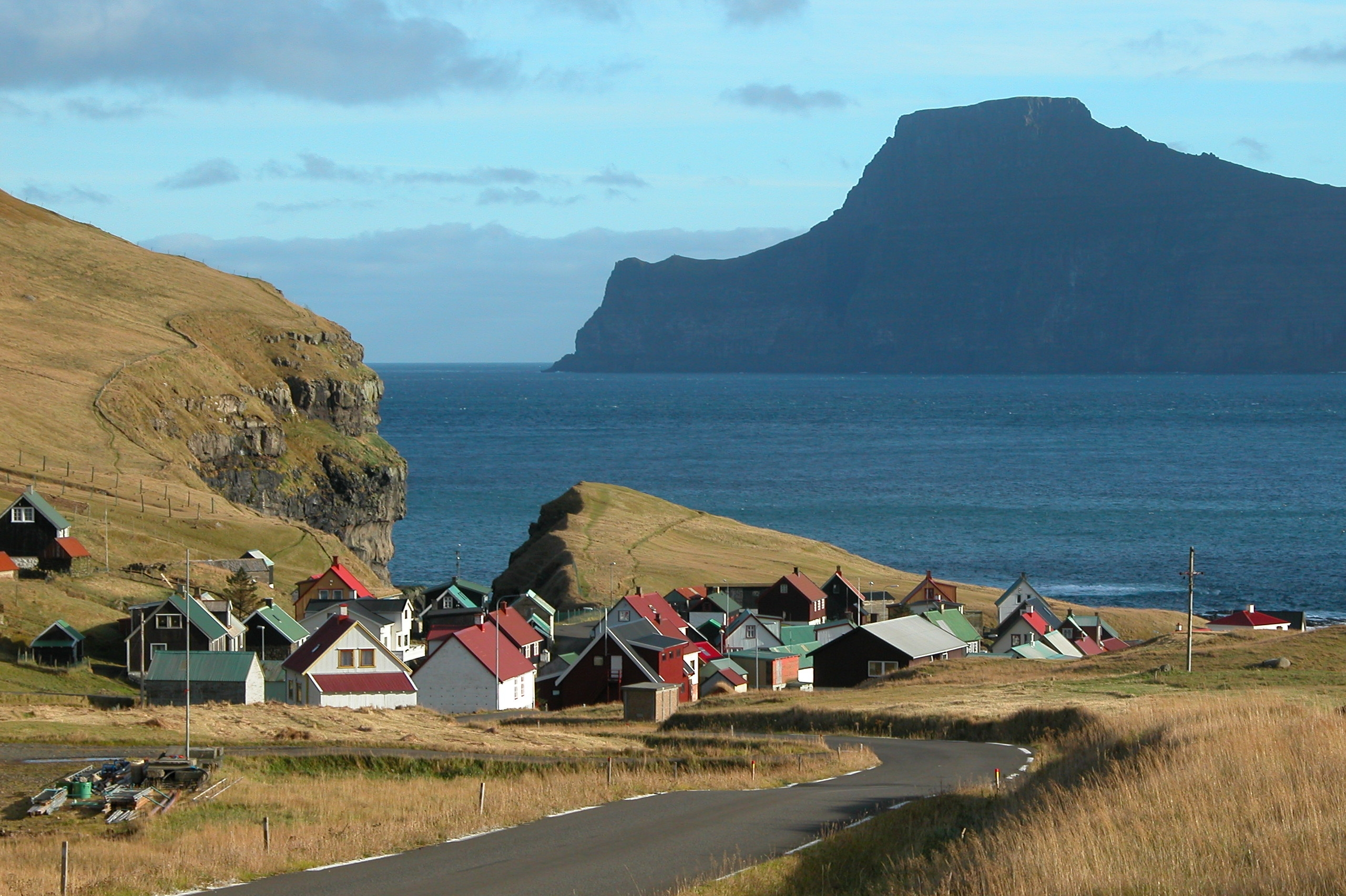
Gjógv

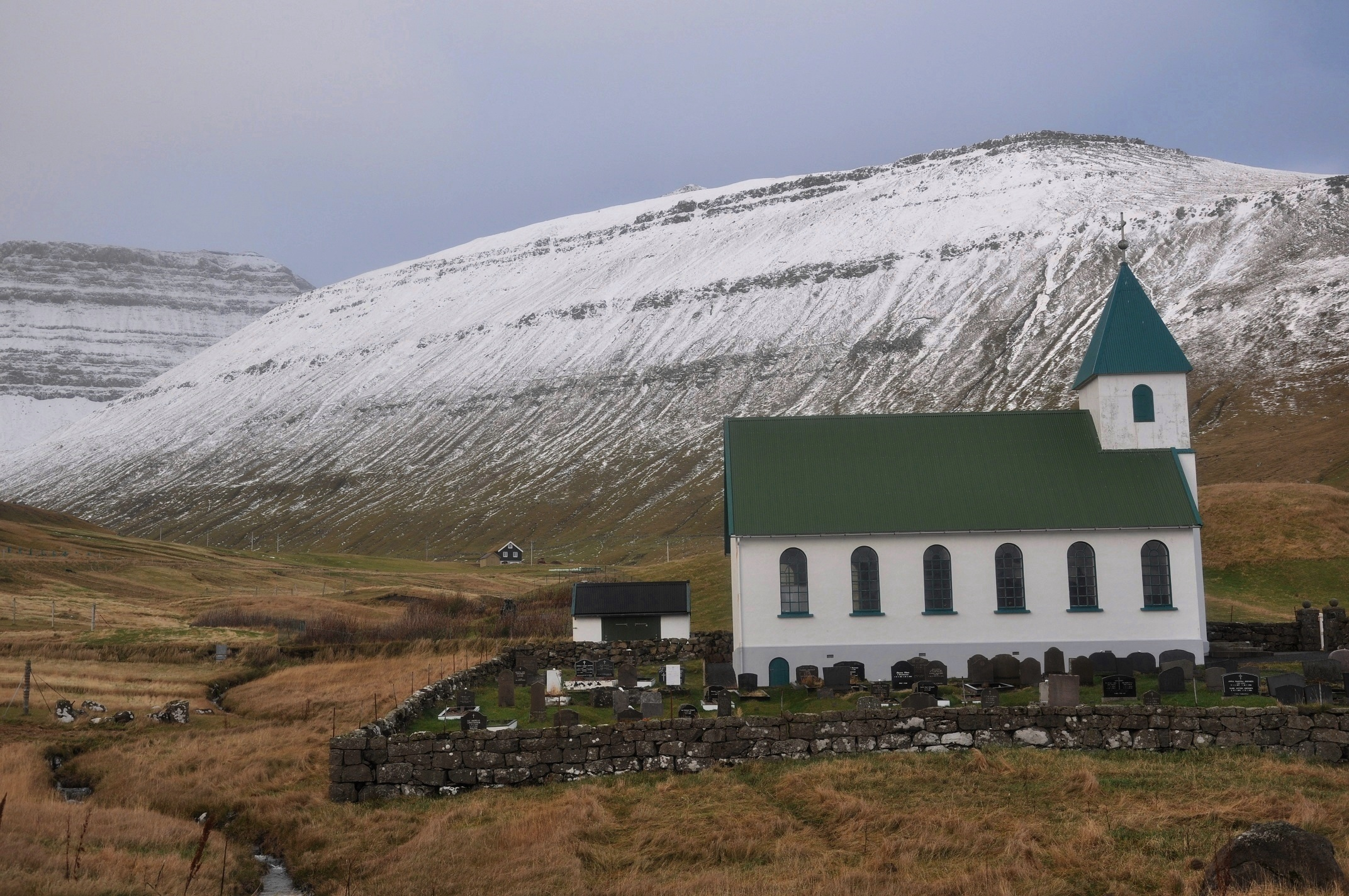
Gjógv Church

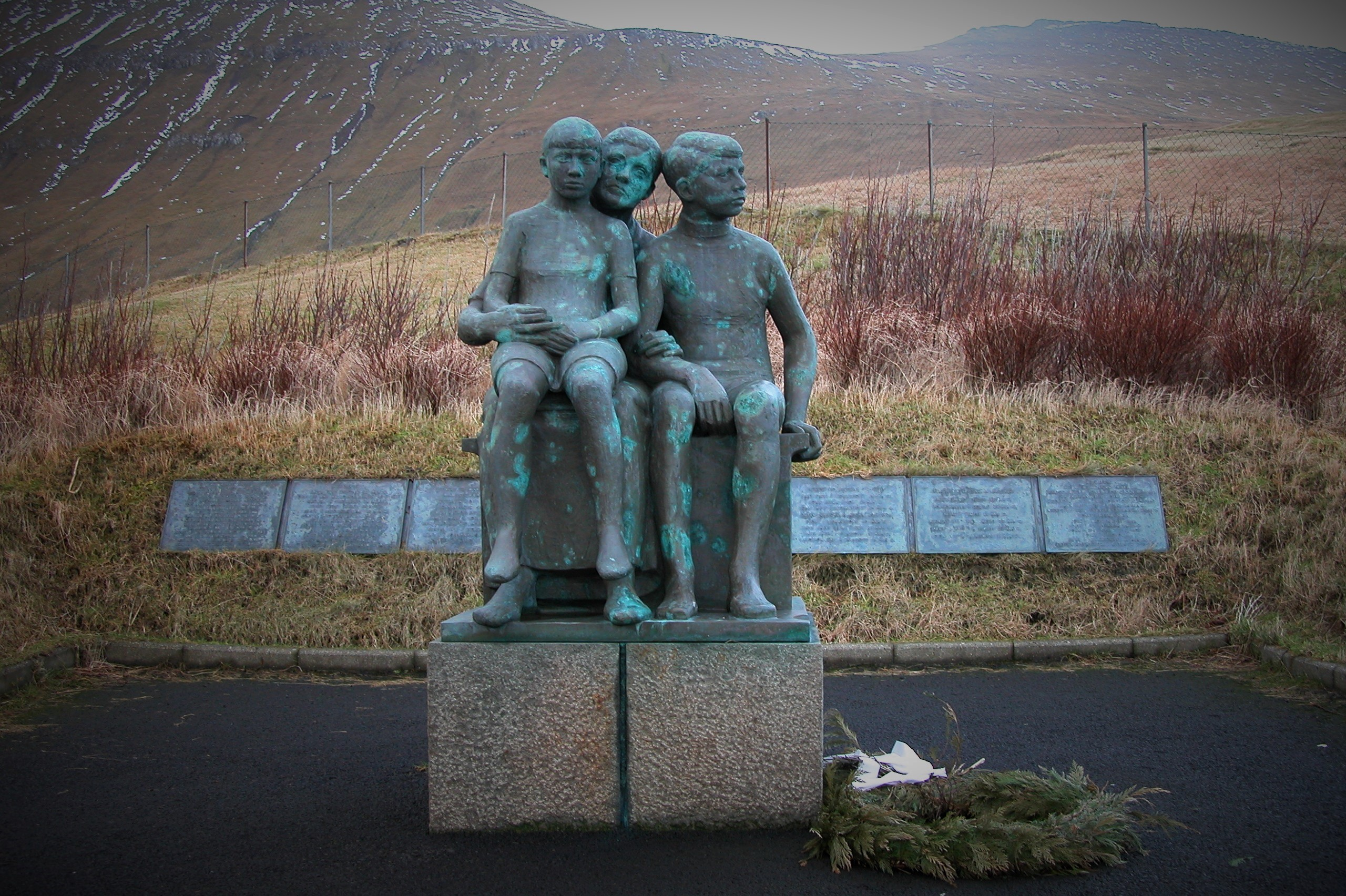
Memorial of people who lost their lives at sea

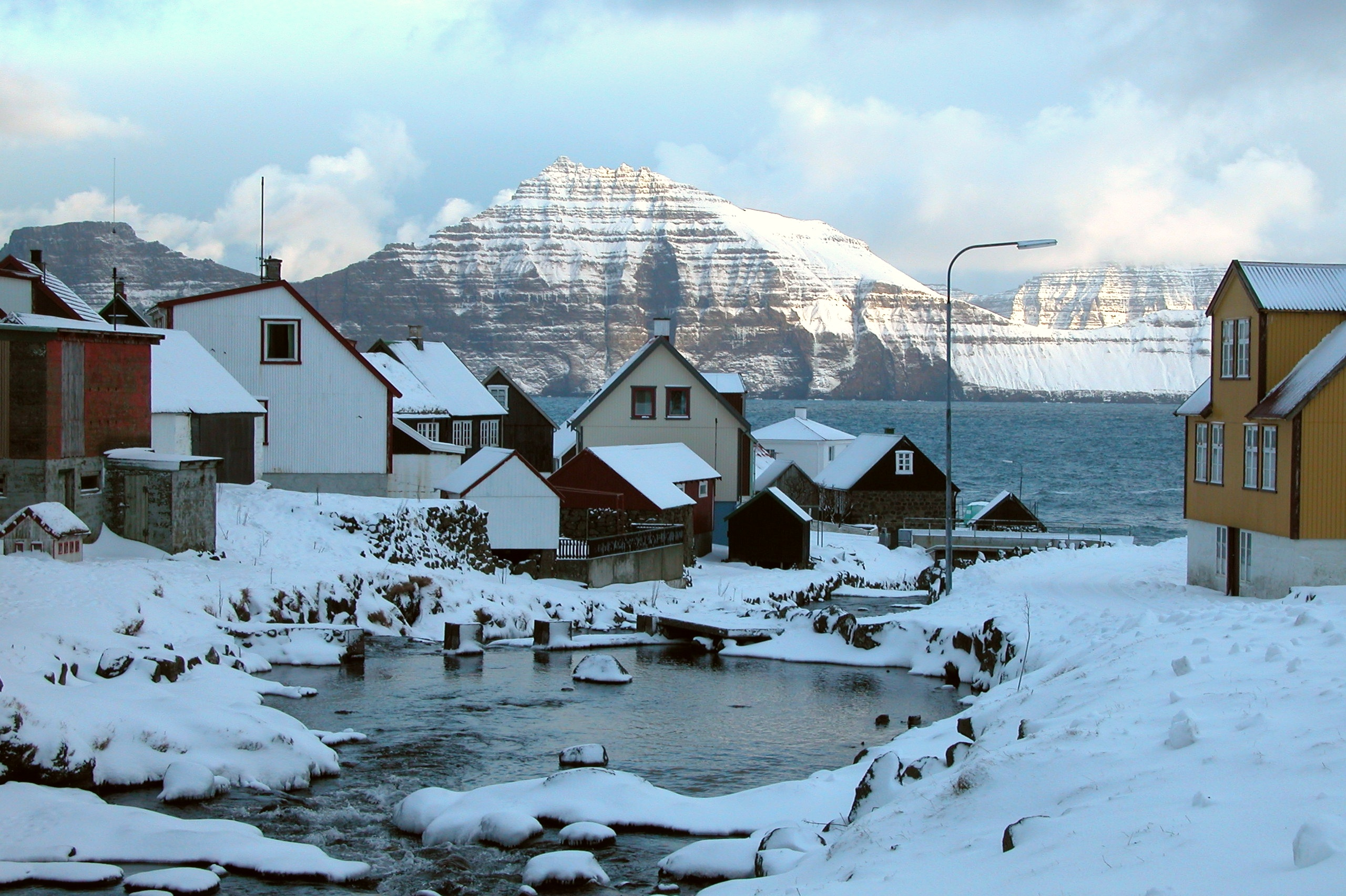
Winter scene in Gjógv

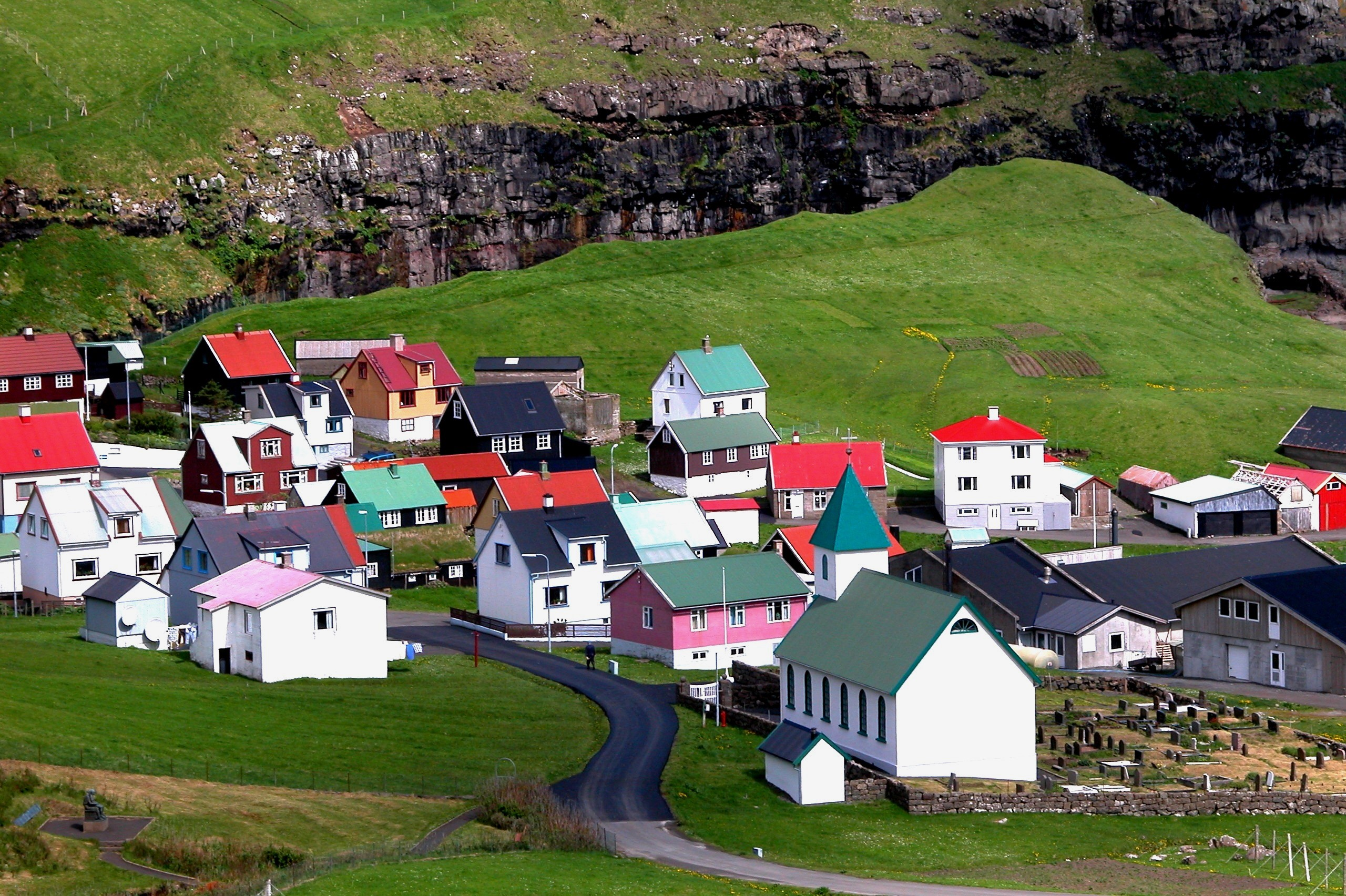
Gjógv

== See also ==
- List of towns in the Faroe Islands
