= Sigurð Joensen =

- Born: April 27, 1911; Gjógv, Faroe Islands
- Died: October 1, 1993 (aged 82); Tórshavn, Faroe Islands
- Occupations: Lawyer, author, politician
- Political party: Republic (Faroe Islands)
- Spouse: Sigrið av Skarði Joensen

Jóhan Hendrik Sigurð Joensen (April 27, 1911 – October 1, 1993) was a Faroese lawyer, author, and politician for the Faroese Republican Party (Faroese: Tjóðveldisflokkurin).

Joensen was born in Gjógv. He married Sigrið av Skarði in 1938. Several of their children and grandchildren became prominent cultural figures in Faroese society, including the educator Turið Sigurðardóttir, the poet and actress Sigri Mitra Gaïni, and the social anthropologist Firouz Gaïni. Their granddaughter Sólrun Løkke Rasmussen is married to Danish Prime Minister Lars Løkke Rasmussen.

From 1941 to 1945, Joensen was the editor of the Faroese-language newspaper Búgvin (Ready). In 1948, Joensen was one of the founders of the Faroese Republican Party (Faroese: Tjóðveldisflokkurin) together with Erlendur Patursson, Jákup í Jákupsstovu, and Hanus við Høgadalsá, and from 1958 to 1970 Joensen was a member of the Faroese Parliament.

Joensen received the Tórshavn council children's book prize for his works Kálvamuan (The Young Calf), Lítli Sjúrður (Little Sigurd), and Lambamæið (The Little Lamb) in 1977, and the Faroese Literature Prize for Eg stoyti heitt in 1987.

== Bibliography ==
- Gráa dunna (1958)
- Kálvamuan (The Young Calf, 1959)
- Lítli Sjúrður (Little Sigurd, 1959)
- Lambamæið (The Little Lamb, 1959)
- Eg stoyti heitt I–II (1987)
- Hvíti tarvur (1991)
- Smálombini (1991)
- Tekstir 1940–1992 (1998)
- Kjørbreyt (1998)
