= Faroese people in Denmark =

(Faroe Islands) Faroese Danes (Denmark) Føroyskir danir
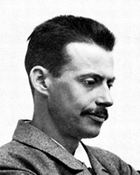

Total population
- 21,687 (2006)

Regions with significant populations
- Copenhagen, Aalborg

Languages
- Faroese, Danish

Religion
- Lutheran

Related ethnic groups
- Faroese Islanders, Icelanders, Norwegians, Swedes, Germans, Danes, Shetlanders, Orcadians, Irish, Scottish; Other Germanic or Celtic ethnic groups

Faroese people in Denmark (also known as Faroese Danes) are residents of Denmark with a Faroese ethnic background.

== Statistics ==
In 2006, 21,687 people of Faroese descent were recorded in Denmark, a figure almost half the population of the Faroe Islands.

On average each year, not fewer than 240 Faroese move to Denmark from Faroe Islands, which is about 0.5% of the Faroese population.

== See also ==
- Faroe Islanders
