= Miðvágur =

Miðvágur Midvåg
- Village
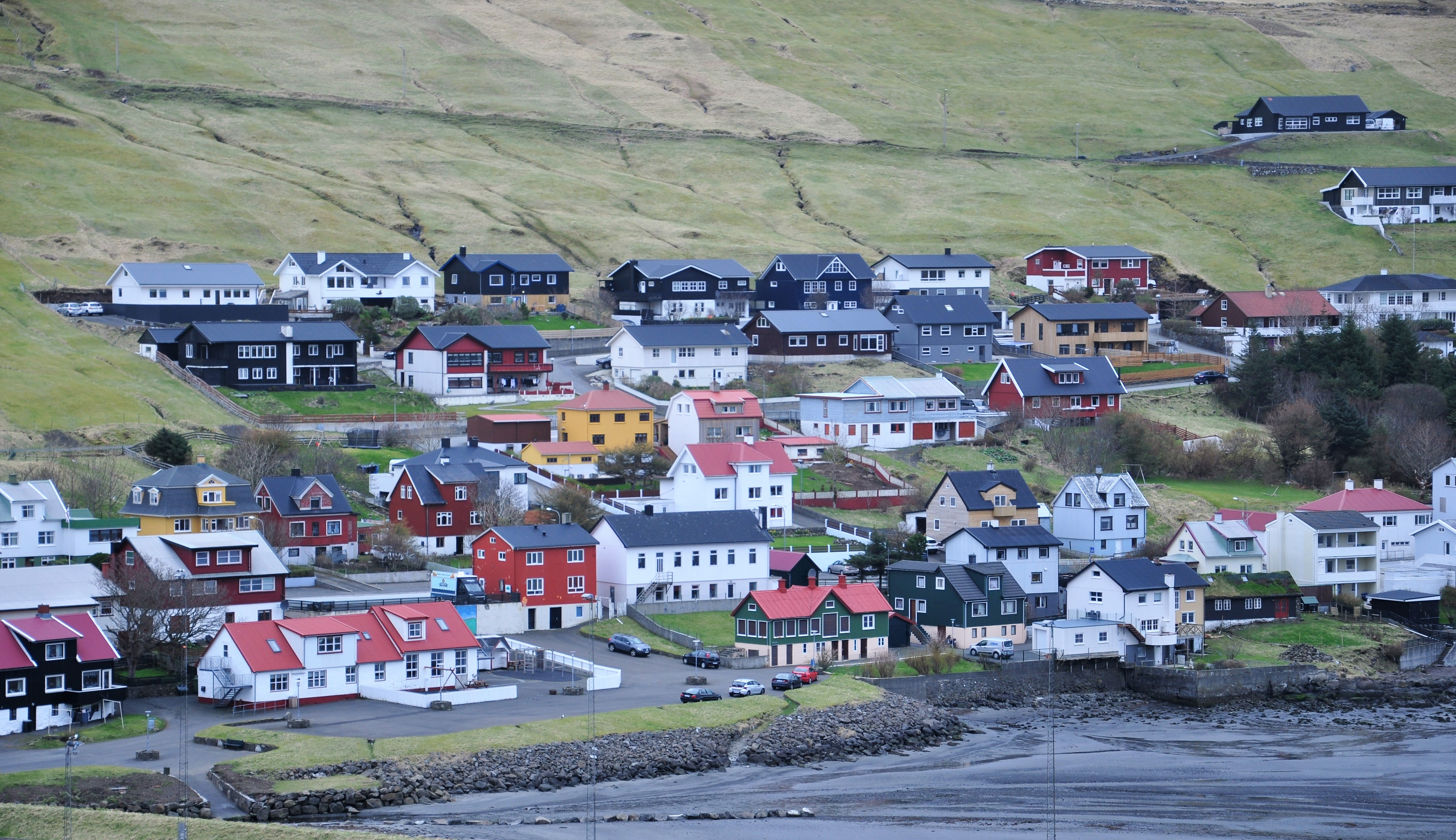

- Location in the Faroe Islands
- Coordinates: 62°03′04″N 7°11′38″W
- State: Kingdom of Denmark
- Constituent country: Faroe Islands
- Island: Vágar
- Municipality: Vága kommuna

Population (September 2025)
  - Total: 1,137
- ZIP code: FO-370
- Climate: Cfc

Miðvágur (Danish: Midvåg), is a village in the Faroe Islands on Vágar. It has been a municipality until 1 January 2009 when it fused with Sandavágur into Vága kommuna.

Located on the south coast of the island of Vágar, Miðvágur is the largest town on this Faroese island. For years, Miðvágur has been known as a good location for whaling and traditionally, bells would ring with the cry "Grindaboð!" - "Pilot whale ahoy!"

== History ==
Miðvágur has been inhabited since at least the Viking Age —as excavations have demonstrated. Since these early times, there has been a local "Thingstätte" (local community council), or "Várting". The most interesting building of the village is Kálvalíð, a house which was probably built at the end of the Middle Ages. It is the oldest building of the village and possibly of the whole Faroe Islands. Kálvalíð consists of two rooms with a turf roof, built in the traditional faroese style. Today it houses a museum.

== Sports ==
The local football team is MB (Miðvágs Bóltfelag), founded in January 1905. The rowing club from Miðvágur is Miðvágs Róðrarfelag.

== People of note from Miðvágur ==
- Greta Svabo Bech, Faroese singer
- Beinta Broberg (1667–1752), a pastor's wife, and believed to be the model for the main character of Barbara, the best-known Faroese novel (written in Danish).
- Pauli Ellefsen (1936-2012), Former Prime Minister (1981-1985)
- Sverri Sandberg Nielsen, (born 1993) a Faroese rower
- Rasmus Rasmussen (1871–1962), writer
- Jens Christian Svabo (1746–1824), a pastor's son, who contributed greatly to the modern concept of a Faroese written language, working to standardize grammar and spelling and created a Faroese dictionary. Svabo also collected a variety of folk-tales and historical examples of the spoken dialect of Faroese on Miðvágur.

== See also ==
- List of towns in the Faroe Islands
