= Christianskirkjan =

Church

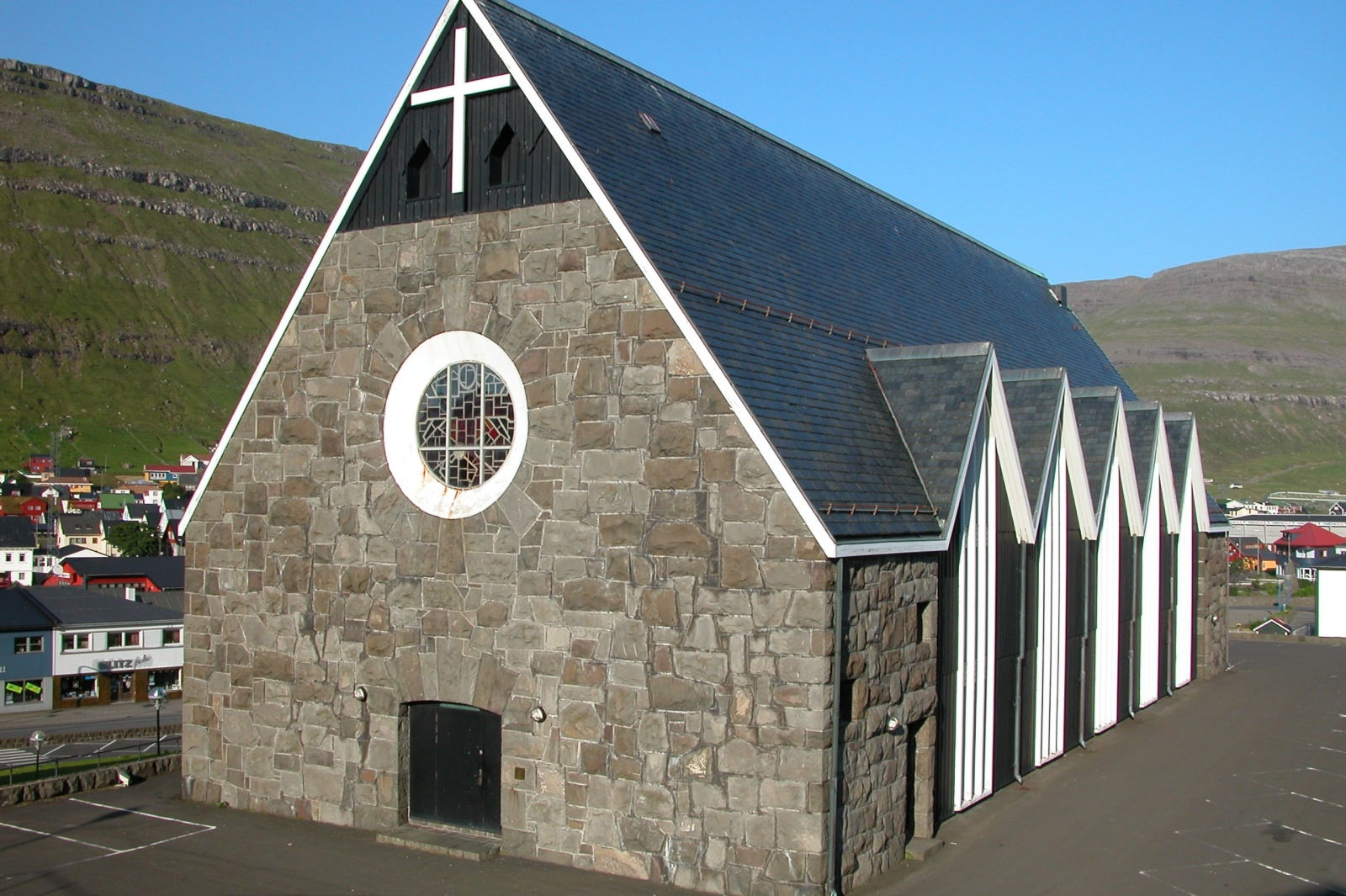
- The front view of Christianskirkjan, with its distinctive rose window.

- Location within Denmark Faroe Islands

General information
- Type: Church
- Architectural style: Old Norse
- Location: Klaksvík, Faroe Islands
- Coordinates: 62°13′31.5″N 6°35′12″W
- Elevation: 15 m (49 ft)
- Inaugurated: 7 July 1963
- Cost: £ 200,000
- Owner: Church of the Faroe Islands

Design and construction
- Architect: Peter Koch

Christianskirkjan (Christian's Church) is a modern church building in Klaksvík, the second-largest town in the Faroe Islands. It was consecrated in 1963. The architect was Peter Koch, a Dane. Aesthetically, it is one of the islands’ most notable modern buildings in the country.

At the time of construction, the church in Klaksvík awoke much interest in creating a culturally historic foundation for a new style of Faroese architecture in that, among other things, it used native building materials, such as basalt and lumber.

== Design ==
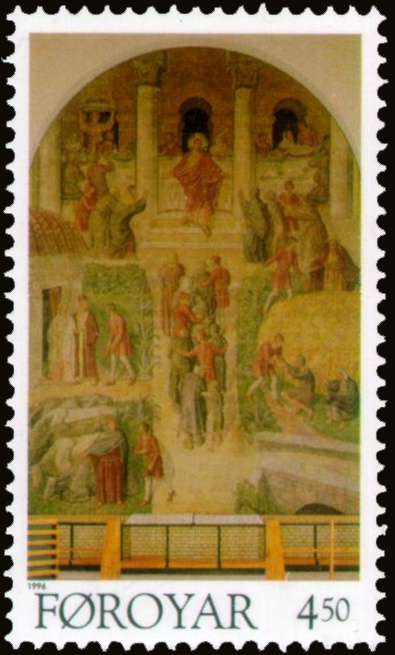
Altarpiece on a Christmas postage stamp from 1996.

Christian's Church of Klaksvík, which is designed without any integral towers, is reminiscent of a Faroese wooden church, classical Viking buildings, or Faroese farms. The outer walls are made of basalt blocks, and the long sides of the roof frame have five unbroken gables. The large window frontage is made in one frame. The bell tower stands somewhat apart from the church building.

The nave is centred around the imposing altarpiece of the Great Banquet, which is seven metres high. The painting had existed long before the church was built. Peter Koch is said to have made the painting his focal point in designing the church. It was created by the Danish church artist Joakim Skovgaard in 1901 as a fresco for the cathedral church in the Danish city of Viborg. Due to the moisture of the walls of the cathedral church, there was the risk that the piece could be destroyed. It was therefore put on canvas in 1910 and placed in the National Museum of Denmark so that it could later be made available to Koch for Christian's Church.

The stained glass in the rose window was created by Danish artist Ulrikke Marseen. The design depicts Christ as the one who bears the weight of the world. This Gothic piece hearkens to the ruins of the Magnus Cathedral in the Faroese village of Kirkjubøur. The baptismal font is made of granite and is also Danish. It is about 4,000 years old and was originally a pagan offering vessel. It comes from a ruin of a church in North Zealand in Denmark, and was gifted to the church by the National Museum of Denmark.

The organ has 29 stops and was built in 1974 by Jensen & Thomsen in Hillerød, Denmark. From the roof beams hangs a Färöboot, an eight-person áttamannafar (a boat specific only to the Faroe Islands). This was the last boat to be built for the rectory in Viðareiði. The boat was sold to Fugloy in 1912 and was one of the boats which was out at sea on the day before Christmas in 1913 for fishing – on the calamitous day on which several boats went missing, including boats from Skarð. All adult men from that village perished that night.

Two memorial plaques hang in the church. One bears witness that the church was built in commemoration of the Farese fishermen and sailors who, sailing as civilians, lost their lives at the time of the British occupation of the Faroe Islands in World War II. The other plaque reports that the church was built in memory of the Danish King, Christian X, after whom the church is named, as Christian's Church.

== One of the "Seven Faroese Wonders" ==
At the Ólavsøka Festival in 2007, the Faroese television company, Kringvarp Føroya, announced a nationwide contest for the "Seven Faroese Wonders“, by which the audience would recommend their favourite buildings and other attractions around the country. The ranking of the eight winners (as two were tied) was not announced, but Christian's Church is among them. The others are the pews from Saint Olav's Church, Kirkjubøur, the Magnus Cathedral, the Nordic House in the Faroe Islands, Tinganes, the Norðoyatunnilin tunnel, the first Flag of the Faroe Islands in the Church of Fámjin, and the Seat of the Danish High Commissioner in the Faroe Islands (the last two being tied).

== See also ==
- Church of the Faroe Islands
