= Skarð, Faroe Islands =

Abandoned village in the Faroe Islands

Skarð
- Village
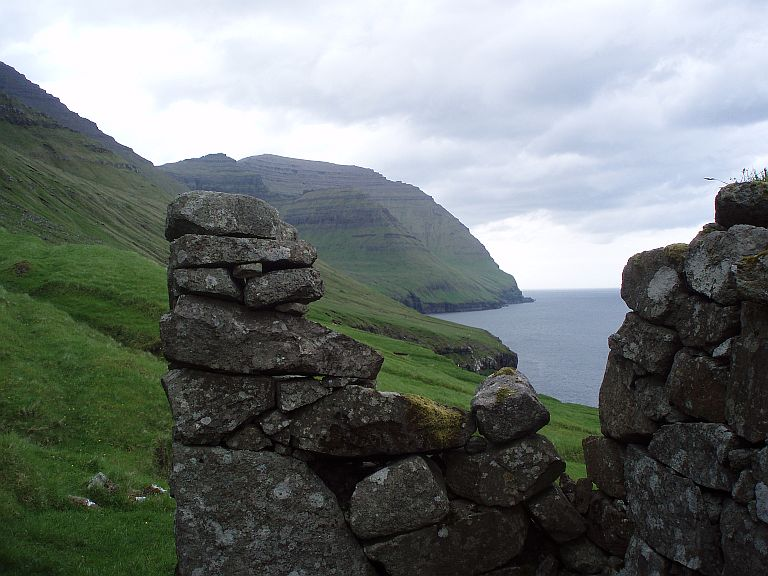
- Ruined building in Skarð

- Location in the Faroe Islands
- Coordinates: 62°19′27″N 6°39′09″W
- State: Kingdom of Denmark
- Constituent Country: Faroe Islands
- Island: Kunoy
- Municipality: Kunoy

Population (1919)
  - Total: 0
  - Density: 0/sq mi (0/km^{2})
- Time zone: GMT
  - Summer (DST): UTC+1 (EST)

Skarð (Faroese: [skɛaɹ]) is an abandoned village on the east coast of the island of Kunoy in the Norðoyar region of the Faroe Islands. Skarð’s name means "mountain pass".

== History ==
On 23 December 1913, all seven able-bodied men of the village perished while out fishing in the village boat. In the following years, the surviving women and children left the village for Haraldssund to the south. The last one left in 1919. One of the old boats from Skarð now hangs in the Christianskirkjan in Klaksvík.

== Footpaths ==
Two footpaths run to Skarð. One runs along the coast from Haraldssund; the other is a high mountain trail over the pass of Skarðsgjógv, from the west-coast village of Kunoy. The latter climbs about 600 metres and is a challenging route recommended for experienced mountain hikers only, though the villagers frequently used it to walk to Kunoy for church services.

== People from Skarð ==
- Símun av Skarði (1872–1942), the founder of the Faroese Folk High School. (Føroya Fólkaháskúli).
- Anna Suffía Rasmussen (1876–1932), Símun's sister, the educator and superintendent of the school.
