= Arnborg Lervig =

Faroese footballer (born 1997)

Personal information
- Date of birth: 20 October 1997 (age 29)
- Place of birth: Faroe Islands
- Position: Midfielder

Team information
- Current team: ÍF/Víkingur/B68

Senior career*
Years	Team	Apps	(Gls)
2013	Víkingur	16	(0)
2014–	ÍF/Víkingur/B68	70	(11)

International career^{‡}
2013	Faroe Islands U17	3	(0)
2014–2015	Faroe Islands U19	6	(1)
2017–	Faroe Islands	5	(0)
- * Club domestic league appearances and goals as of 7 July 2019 ‡ National team caps and goals as of 7 July 2019

Arnborg Lervig (born 20 October 1997) is a Faroese football midfielder who currently plays for ÍF/Víkingur/B68 and the Faroe Islands women's national football team.
