= Sigert Patursson =

Faroese explorer

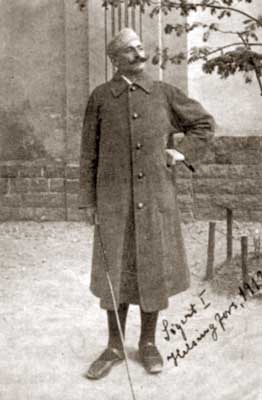
Sigert Patursson in 1912

Sigert O. Patursson (October 15, 1869 – September 17, 1931) was a Faroese explorer.

Patursson was born in Kirkjubøur, the son of Poul Peder Pedersen (a.k.a. Páll Patursson), a holder of publicly owned land (Faroese: kongsbóndi), and Ellen Cathrine (née Djonesen). His siblings Helena, Jóannes, Sverri, Gazet and Petur were all prominent figures in Faroese society. The siblings were home schooled by Joen Hans Jacob Petersen, the brother of Fríðrikur Petersen.

In 1889, at the age of 20, Sigert Patursson traveled to western Siberia and the Kara Sea. The journey lasted six years, and when he returned to the Faroe Islands he wrote the book Sibirien i vore Dage (Siberia Today). The book was published in 12 fascicles from 1900 to 1901, and then combined into a single book with the same title in 1901. In addition to the journey itself, the book focuses on the culture that he discovered there. Among other things, he described a local peasant wedding. A Faroese translation of the book by Sigrið av Skarði Joensen was published in 1994. Patursson also traveled to many other lands, including Mongolia and Egypt, which was very unusual for a Faeroese at that time.

== Later travels in Persia and the Caucasus ==
Around 1917, Patursson traveled extensively in Persia and Russia. He eventually arrived in Baku, then part of the Russian Caucasus, where he came to the attention of the Danish consul Erik Biering. According to Biering's memoirs, Patursson appeared without a hat or passport, wearing a short blue jacket with yellow buttons and short white trousers, and was initially detained by local police before being brought to the Danish consulate. Though penniless, he had ambitious plans to establish an ornithological museum in Kislovodsk and claimed to have received 300 rubles from the chancellery of Empress Maria Feodorovna in St. Petersburg — funding he had obtained through his brother Jóannes's political connections in Denmark. After a period in Baku, he traveled to Kislovodsk to pursue his museum project, but was eventually expelled from the Caucasus by authorities following complaints about his behavior.

Sigert Patursson also wrote several works in support of Faroese independence. He also called for an independent and more varied Faroese economy, envisioning reforestation, seaweed export, coal mining, a textile industry, mills for wool-spinning, and hydropower. Patursson was broadly ridiculed at the time for these suggestions, with newspaper headlines such as "Is manden rigtig klog?" (Is the Man Crazy?). However, his vision was also praised by some.
