= Sanna av Skarði =

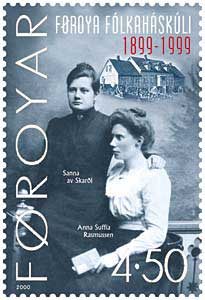
Sanna av Skarði (left) depicted with Anna Suffía Rasmussen on a Faroese postage stamp

Sanna av Skarði (born Súsanna Kathrina Jacobsen, April 19, 1876 – February 12, 1978) was a Faroese educator.

== Early life ==
Sanna av Skarði was born in Tórshavn, the daughter of Jacob Jacobsen and Elsebeth Jacobsen née Djonesen. In 1901 she married Símun av Skarði, who co-founded the Faroese Folk High School (Faroese: Føroya Fólkaháskúli) together with Rasmus Rasmussen in Klaksvík in 1899.

== Career ==
She taught alongside her husband at the school.

== Personal life ==
Sanna and Símun were the parents of the journalist Sigrið av Skarði Joensen (1908–1975) and the linguist Jóhannes av Skarði (1911–1999). She died in Tórshavn at the age of 101.

== Commemoration ==
In 2000, she was featured on a Faroese stamp together with her sister-in-law Anna Suffía Rasmussen. Aside from Ruth Smith's self-portrait, this was the first Faroese postage stamp depicting prominent women.
