= Christmas Meeting of 1888 =

Start of the Faroese National Movement

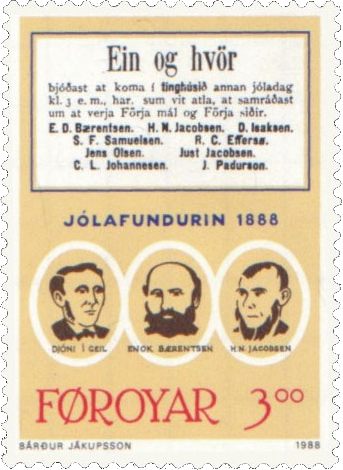
3.00 kr stamp

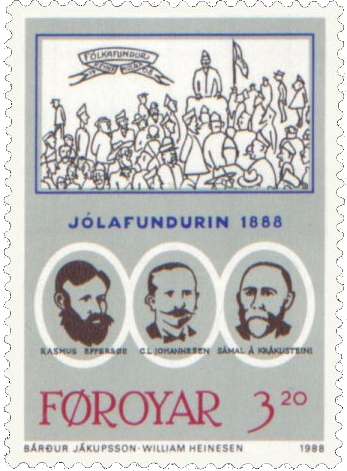
3.20 kr stamp

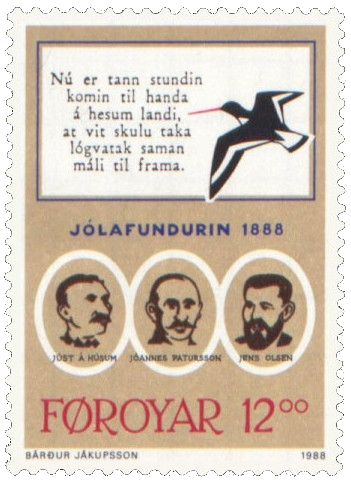
12.00 kr stamp

The Christmas Meeting of 1888 (Faroese: Jólafundurin 1888) is considered to be the official start of the Faroese National Movement.

In spite of a raging storm and slushy roads, a large crowd of people gathered in the house of the Løgting that afternoon. Speeches were made and patriotic songs were sung. The highlight of the meeting came when the poet Rasmus Effersøe recited a battle hymn written for the occasion by young Jóannes Patursson. The message of the lengthy poem was evident in the first stanza:

Now the hour has come,
when we must join hands
and rally around
our native tongue.

== Resolution ==
The meeting ended with the acceptance of a six-point resolution:

1. As soon as there were enough Faroese schoolbooks available, Faroese should be used as an educational language in schools.
2. In history, the emphasis must be on Faroese national history.
3. In religion, all Danish rote learning should be abolished and the subject matter rendered in Faroese.
4. Priests must be free to use Faroese in and outside the Church.
5. Faroese should be used for all official ends and purposes.
6. Finally, the resolution stressed the necessity of establishing a Faroese Folk High School.

== Stamps ==
Bárður Jákupsson made the stamps above right which show the nine people who sent out the invitation to the Christmas Meeting in 1888.

- 3.00 kr stamp – Notice in Dimmalætting December 22 1888, which is mentioned in the text.
- 3.20 kr stamp – Drawing of meeting in Reynsmúlalág in 1908 by William Heinesen.
- 12.00 kr stamp – First verse of poem by Jóannes Patursson.
