= Anna Suffía Rasmussen =

Faroese educator

Anna Suffia Rasmussen
- Onna Sofía av Skarði
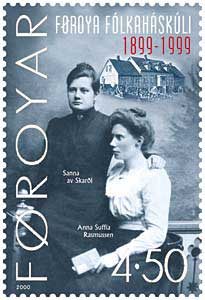
- Anna Suffía Rasmussen (right) depicted with Sanna av Skarði on a Faroese postage stamp
- Born: Anna Suffía Johannesen; January 31, 1876
- Died: November 4, 1932 (aged 56)

Anna Suffía Rasmussen (née av Skarði), (31 January 1876 – 4 November 1932) was a Faroese educator.

== Early life ==
Anna Suffía Rasmussen was born on 31 January 1876 in Skarð as Anna Suffía (or Onna Sofía) Johannesen, daughter of Johannes Frederik Johannesen and Else Frederikke Matras. She grew up in the small fishing village in the north of the Faroe Islands. She and her only sibling, Símun, were also known as Anna Sofiá and Símun av Skarði, ‘from Skarð’.

Rasmussen's mother was from the Matras family of Viðareiði, who were descended from the barber and farmer Hans Albertsen Matras, who move to the Faroe Islands from Nakskov in 1707. The Faroese politicians Hans David Matras and Joen Michael Matras were relations on her mother's side.

The village of Skarð was later abandoned after all the able-bodied men in the village were shipwrecked and died at sea on Christmas Eve 1913.

== Career ==
Her brother Símun av Skarði lost one of his feet and was unable to work as a fisherman as did most men in their village, so he trained to become a teacher. Inspired by the Danish folk high school adult education movement, Símun and Rasmus Rasmussen joined forces to establish Føroya Fólkaháskúli, a Faroese folk high school in 1899. It was the first school in the Faroe Islands to teach in the Faroese language. The school began in temporary premises in Klaksvík, and moved to Tórshavn, the capital of the Faroe Islands, in 1909.

Anna Sofía was involved from the start of the school as housekeeper and teacher of domestic science. Her sister-in-law Sanna av Skarði eventually took over as housekeeper. Her niece was the journalist Sigrið av Skarði Joensen.

== Personal life ==
Anna Suffía Johannesen married Rasmus Rasmussen in 1904. Her brother Símun av Skarði, had co-founded the Faroese Folk high school Faroese Folk High School (Faroese: Føroya Fólkaháskúli) with her husband in Klaksvík in 1899.

Anna Suffía Rasmussen died aged 56 on 4 November 1932 in Tórshavn.

== Commemoration ==
In 2000, she was featured on a Faroese stamp together with her sister-in-law Sanna av Skarði. They were the first women to be depicted on Faroese stamps, preceded only by painter Ruth Smith's self-portrait.
