= Andrea Árting =

Faroese politician and trade union leader

Andrea Súsanna Árting née Rasmussen (1891–1988) was a Faroese politician and trade union leader. A supporter of self-government, she is remembered as one of the most active figures in the labour movement, heading the Havnar Arbejðskvinnufelag (Tórshavn Working Women's Association) for almost 40 years.

== Biography ==
Born out of marriage on 23 December 1891 in Tórshavn, Andrea Súsanna Rasmussen was the daughter of Jacob Johansen and Susanne Rasmussen. She was brought up by her maternal aunt and uncle, Kathrine Malene Rasmussen and Elias Johansen, in the Rættará district of the capital. Johansen was a boat builder who had been active in politics. After finishing school, Árting worked in dried fish production and in a fish shop. When 17, she caught tuberculosis and spent a couple of years in a sanatorium. She then went to Denmark where she worked as a maid for six years. In 1922, she married the fisherman Johannes Frederik (Heinesen) Árting, with whom she had four children.

In 1937, Árting was elected chair of the Tórshavn Working Women's Association which had been founded the previous year. Most of the members were women working in the fishing industry who found it difficult to take on responsibilities in the organization as they would have to take time off work. As a local resident, Árting could afford to be more independent and was not afraid to appear in public. She was therefore able to lead the organization with only short interruptions until 1977. She was also a board member of the Føroya Arbeiðarafelag (Faroese Workers' Association) from 1940 to 1958, thereafter becoming a lifelong honorary member.

Árting was an effective leader, fighting for better pay for the workers who earned far less than fishermen, especially in the 1950s. She took part in many critical negotiations, participating in a strike in 1951 which was successful in avoiding a threatened reduction in workers' salaries. In her later years, she also fought for equal salaries for men and women, obtaining success in 1977 when it was agreed that women's hourly pay should be increased incrementally year by year until reaching that of men in 1981.

On the political front, Árting was also active in pushing for Faroese national independence. Though not successful, in 1940 she was one of the first women to stand for the elections to the Løgting, representing the Loysingarflokkurin or Separatist Party. With the founding of the Tjóðveldisflokkurin Republican Party in 1948, she became one of its most faithful supporters.

== Outside interests ==
From her childhood, Árting was interested in music, learning to play various instruments. She wrote poems and songs, often supporting better conditions for the workers. She also encouraged women in the rowing sport known as kaproning which had traditionally been reserved for men. More generally, she inspired women to enter public life, believing them to be just as capable as men, as she herself had demonstrated.

== Death ==
Andrea Árting died in Tórshavn on 30 May 1988.
