= Hans Hansen (Faroese painter) =

Faroese painter

Hans Hansen, called Hans í Mikladali (14 November 1920 – 8 March 1970) was a Faroese painter from Mikladalur, Faroe Islands.

His career started with sea fishing from the age of fifteen, and it was only after meeting the painter Jóhannes Sveinsson Kjarval in Iceland during the second world war that he decided to train as a painter. He travelled to Copenhagen in 1949 and studied, first in Bizzie Højers art school, and then at the Academy of Fine Arts' painting school from 1953 to 1957, where he became interested in fresco painting technique. He graduated and then returned to the Faroe Islands, where he worked as a visual artist in Tórshavn.

Four of his paintings were featured on a series of Faroese postage stamps issued in September 1998:

== Gallery ==
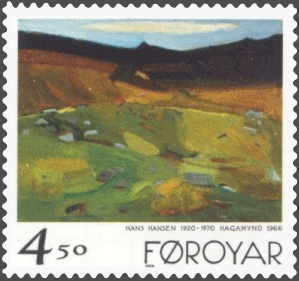
Stamp FR 333 of 1998: The Heath.

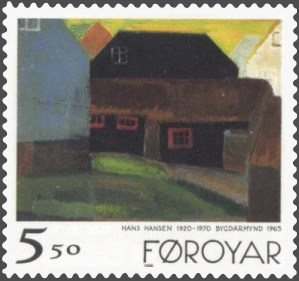
FR 334: Village.

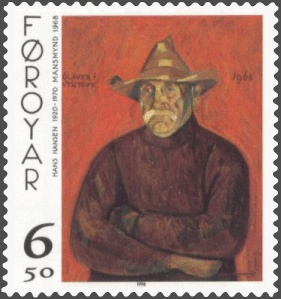
FR 335: Man.

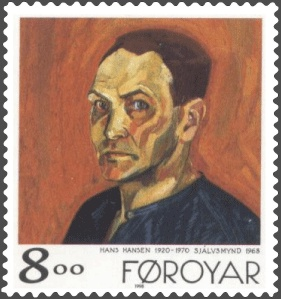
FR 336: Self-portrait.
