= Símun av Skarði =

Faroese teacher (1872–1942)

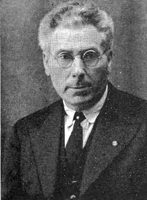
- Born: 3 May 1872; Skarð, Faroe Islands
- Died: 9 October 1942 (aged 70); Tórshavn, Faroe Islands

Símun av Skarði (3 May 1872 – 9 October 1942) was a Faroese poet, politician, and teacher.

== Biography ==
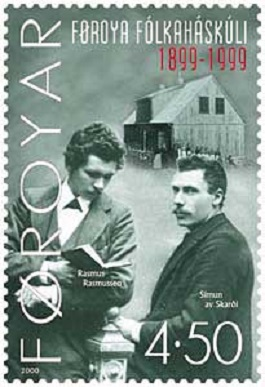
Símun av Skarði (right) together with his friend and school co-founder Rasmus Rasmussen on a stamp of 2002

Símun was born in Skarð, a village on the island of Kunoy. In 1893, he entered the seminary in Tórshavn, which he graduated from as a teacher in 1896. He attended Askov Højskole from 1896 to 1898, and then the State Teachers College in Copenhagen from 1898 to 1899. In 1899, he co-founded the Faroese folk high school (Føroya Fólkaháskúli) together with Rasmus Rasmussen (1871–1962). He worked there as headmaster and teacher from 1899 to 1942. Símun's sister, Anna Suffía Rasmussen (1876–1932), who had married Rasmus Rasmussen, served as the superintendent. Rasmus Rasmussen worked there as a teacher until 1947.

He was the husband of the educator Sanna av Skarði (1876–1978), who also taught at Føroya Fólkaháskúli. They were the parents of the journalist Sigrið av Skarði Joensen (1908–1975) and linguist Jóhannes av Skarði (1911–1999). Danish Prime Minister Lars Løkke Rasmussen is his great-grandson-in-law.

His best-known work as a poet is the Faroese national anthem, Mítt alfagra land, better known by its incipit Tú alfagra land mítt. He was a member of parliament for the Self-Government Party (Sjálvstýrisflokkurin) from 1906 to 1914.

== Other sources ==
- Løgtingið og høvundarnir 2: Løgtingið 150 (1st ed.) p. 350. Tórshavn Løgtingið 2002.
