= Rúni Brattaberg =

Faroese opera singer

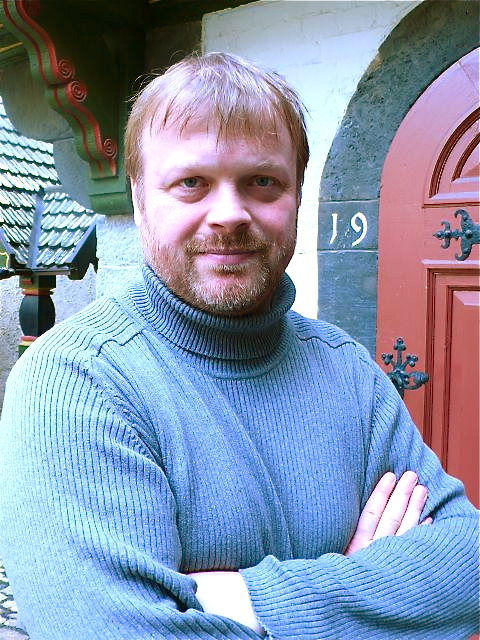
- Rúni Brattaberg in 2012
- Born: 1966 (age 59–60); Vágur, Faroe Islands
- Occupation: opera singer (bass)
- Years active: 1999 to present

Rúni Brattaberg is a bass opera singer from the Faroe Islands, who works in operas around the world. He has been building his repertoire with Wagner (Gurnemanz, Hagen, Hunding, Fafner, Pogner, Heinrich) and other leading bass roles such as Osmin/The Abduction from the Seraglio, Timur/Turandot, Sparafucile/Rigoletto, Sarastro/The Magic Flute, Kaspar/Der Freischütz, the Doctor/Wozzeck, Rocco/Fidelio, and Basilio/The Barber of Seville in the ensembles of the Mainz, Ulm, Detmold, Bern, and Mannheim opera companies. In January 2017 he received the Faroese Cultural Prize.

== Background ==
Rúni was born and raised in the village of Vágur on Suðuroy, the southernmost island of the Faroe Islands. He is the son of Árni and Karin Brattaberg, founders of the Faroese wool yarn and knitwear company "Sirri", based in Vágur.

Rúni first graduated as a documentary photographer in Copenhagen, and worked as a documentary photographer for eight years, before he trained to become a singer. He studied at the Sibelius-Akatemia in Helsinki from 1997 to 1999 and at Internationales Opernstudio IOS in Zurich from 1999 to 2000.

Brattaberg is married to German opera singer Susanne Brattaberg-Jacoby.

== Career ==
In 2001 Brattaberg received his first engagement as a soloist at the Staatstheater Mainz, 2005/2006 he was a member of the ensemble at the Bern Theatre.

Rúni Brattaberg was engaged at the Theater Ulm from the season 2006/2007 to 2007/2008, where he debuted as a doctor in Wozzeck under the baton of James Allen Gähres, in a production directed by Matthias Kaiser. In Ulm he was still to be heard and seen in the following roles: as Seneca in L'incoronazione di Poppea, as Kaspar in Der Freischütz, as Gremin in Eugene Onegin, and as Banquo in Macbeth.

From 2009 to 2011 he was engaged at the National Theater Mannheim performing Gurnemanz, Hagen, Hunding, Fafner, Veit Pogner, König Heinrich, Basilio, Timur, Sparafucile, Sarastro, Baron Ochs, and Osmin.

He sang as a guest at the Dutch National Opera in Amsterdam, in Lausanne, at Theater Bonn, at Aalto Theater in Essen, and at the Opera Bastille in Paris.

In 2004, the British composer Gavin Bryars wrote two pieces for choir and bass soloist especially for Rúni Brattaberg which were first performed in London in November of that year. The collaboration between the two artists continued, and along with Faroese singer Eivør Pálsdóttir, a performance and recording of two works, conducted by Bryars, was realized in the Faroe Islands in 2011.

Since the 2008/2009 season, Rúni Brattaberg has covered the roles of Hagen and Baron Ochs at the Metropolitan Opera in New York. In May 2011, he replaced the ill Kurt Rydl as Baron Ochs in Amsterdam, in a performance conducted by Sir Simon Rattle. In March 2013 he starred at the Metropolitan Opera HD Live transmission worldwide, as "Titurel" in Richard Wagner's "Parsifal", under the baton of Daniele Gatti. In the same year, Rúni Brattaberg portrayed Baron Ochs in his Cincinnati Opera debut. He also debuted in 2013 at the Lyric Opera of Chicago singing Titurel in "Parsifal".

From March to May 2014, he sang the role of Baron Ochs in "Der Rosenkavalier" at Malmö Opera, and in July of the same year he performed in Auckland, New Zealand, appearing as König Marke in Wagner's "Tristan und Isolde".

Since 2014, he has been engaged at the Leipzig Opera, singing various roles in operas such as Sarastro in Mozart's "Die Zauberflöte" or Sparafucile in Verdi's "Rigoletto", particularly specializing in Wagner roles like Fafner in "Siegfried", Hagen in "Götterdämmerung", Hunding in "Die Walküre", and Gurnemanz in "Parsifal".

== Recordings ==
- 2000 – Mikko Heiniö: The Knight and the Dragon, by Curt Appelgren, Rúni Brattaberg, Mikko Heiniö, and Ulf Söderblom
- 2001 – Brotið song by Rúni Brattaberg, composed by Regin Dahl, Modest Mussorgsky, Franz Schubert, Jean Sibelius and Sunleif Rasmussen.

== Honour ==
- 2016 – Mentanarvirðisløn Landsins (Faroese Cultural Prize)
