= Rasmus Rasmussen (writer) =

Faroese writer (1871–1962)

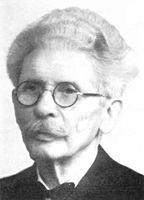
- Born: July 13, 1871; Miðvágur
- Died: October 5, 1962 (aged 91); Tórshavn
- Occupation: Folk high school teacher
- Spouse: Anna Suffía Rasmussen

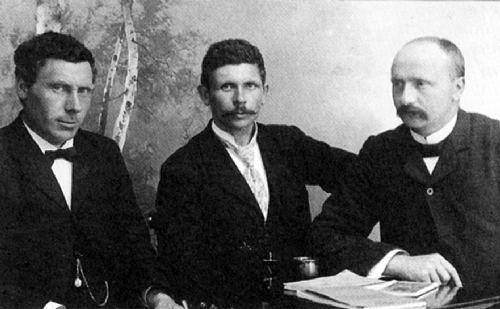
Símun av Skarði, Rasmus Rasmussen, and Símun Pauli úr Konoy (left to right)

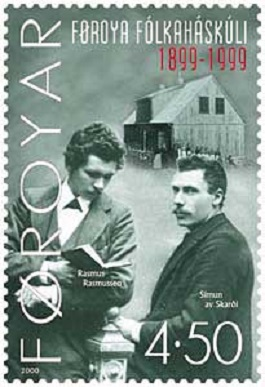
Rasmus Rasmussen (left) and Símun av Skarði on a stamp

Rasmus Rasmussen (August 13, 1871 – October 5, 1962), also known as Regin í Líð and Rasmus á Háskúlanum, was a Faroese folk high school teacher, writer, and independence activist.

== Life ==
Rasmussen was born in Miðvágur in 1871, the son of Johannes Rasmussen and Ata Haraldsdatter. Growing up was no different than it was for most children in the Faroes at the time, and he was engaged in odd jobs while not attending school. He studied under Jacob Jacobsen from Tórshavn, and he was a member of the first graduating class of the Faroese Teachers School (Faroese: Føroya Læraraskúli), after having also spent an academic year at a folk high school in Denmark. Jacobsen's wife, Anna Kjelnæs, had also attended a folk high school in Denmark, and this is where Rasmussen first became familiar with the folk high school movement.

His urge to attend such a school was so strong that in 1892 he left the family farm, which he had allodial rights to, and started attending the crafts department at Vallekilde Folk High School. He remained there for two academic years, working as a carpenter in the summers. During the 1896/97 academic year he attended Askov Folk High School, where he made the acquaintance of his compatriot Símun av Skarði. In 1904, Rasmussen married Símun's sister, Anna Suffía av Skarði, and he remained Símun's close friend and coworker. Rasmussen also attended the State Teachers School (Danish: Statens Lærerhøjskole) in Copenhagen, where his main study area was science.

Rasmussen's wife, Anna Suffía, served as superintendent after Símun av Skarði and Rasmus Rasmussen founded the Faroese Folk High School (Faroese: Føroya Fólkaháskúli) in Klaksvík in 1899. This is still the only Faroese folk high school, and it became the first school to teach in Faroese. The school was relocated to Tórshavn in 1909, and Rasmussen served as a teacher at the school until he retired in 1947. His teacher's position there was the source of his Faroese epithet Rasmus á Háskúlanum (literally, 'Rasmus at the high school').

Rasmussen died in Tórshavn.

== Politician ==
Rasmussen was a clear proponent of Faroese independence and he served in the Løgting as a representative from Norðoyar from 1914 to 1928 as a member of the Home Rule Party (Faroese: Sjálvstýrisflokkurin). He viewed work with the folk high school as part of the effort to cultivate the minds of Faroese young people, which was essential in working for Faroese autonomy. Rasmussen was also among the founders of the Faroese Fishing Union (Faroese: Føroya Fiskimannafelag) together with Símun Pauli úr Konoy in 1911, was the union's first secretary, and served as its director until 1947.

== Author ==
Rasmussen published the first Faroese novel, Babelstornið (The Tower of Babel), in 1909. In 1910, he published the first Faroese botany textbook.

== Bibliography ==
- 1909: Bábelstornið (The Tower of Babel)
- 1910: Plantulæra (Botany)
- 1912: Glámlýsi (Dazzling Light)
- 1922–1923: Voluspá (Prophecy of the Seeress), translation
- 1928: Høvdingar hittast (Heroes Meet), play
- 1936: Føroya Flora (Faroese Flora)
- 1942: Tvær fornsøgur (Two Old Stories)
- 1943: Tvær skaldsøgur (Two Novels)
- 1945: Fornmálasagnir og fornmálaljóð (Legends and Poems in the Old Language)
- 1945: Hávamál (Sayings of the High One), translation
- 1946: Gróðrarnýtsla fyrr í tíðini (Cultivation in Old Times)
- 1949: Sær er siður á landi (Every Country Has its Own Customs), memoirs
- 1950: Føroysk Plantunøvn (Faroese Plant Names)
- 1951: Yvirlit yvir Føroya søgu (Overview of Faroese History)
- 1952: Gróður og gróðrarvánir (Growth and Growing Conditions)
- 2001: Rakul – og aðrar søgur (Rakul and Other Stories), also audiobook
