= Faroe Islanders =

Ethnic group and nation native to the Faroe Islands

Faroese people
føroyingar (Faroese)
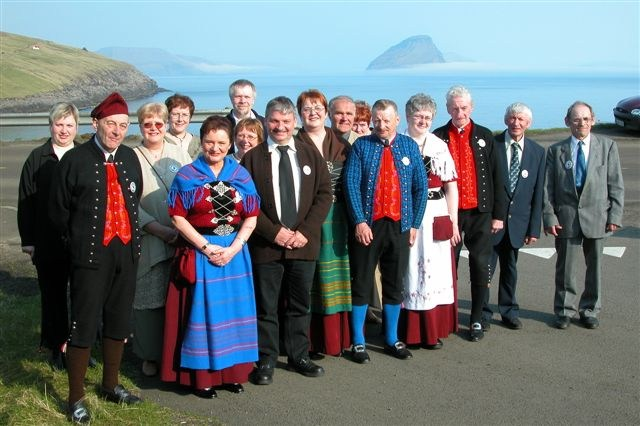
- Faroese folk dancers in national costumes

Total population
- c. 70,000

Regions with significant populations
- Faroe Islands: ≈50,000
- Denmark: 21,687
- Norway: 1,981

Languages
- Faroese; Danish (Gøtudanskt)

Religion
- Lutheranism (Church of the Faroe Islands); Historically also the Norse religion and Roman Catholicism (1000–1538)

Related ethnic groups
- Danes, Norwegians, Swedes, Icelanders, and British people

Faroese people or Faroe Islanders (Faroese: føroyingar; Danish: færinger) are an ethnic group native to the Faroe Islands. The Faroese are of mixed Norse and British origins. About 21,000 Faroese live in neighbouring countries, particularly in Denmark, Iceland and Norway. Most Faroese are citizens of the Kingdom of Denmark, in which the Faroe Islands are a constituent nation. The Faroese language is one of the North Germanic languages and is closely related to Icelandic and to western Norwegian varieties.

== Origins ==
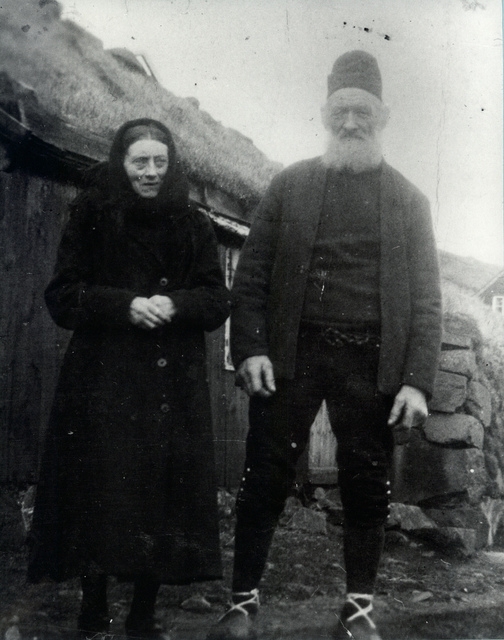
Elderly Faroese couple in the 1940s, wearing their traditional 'Sunday dress' for Church

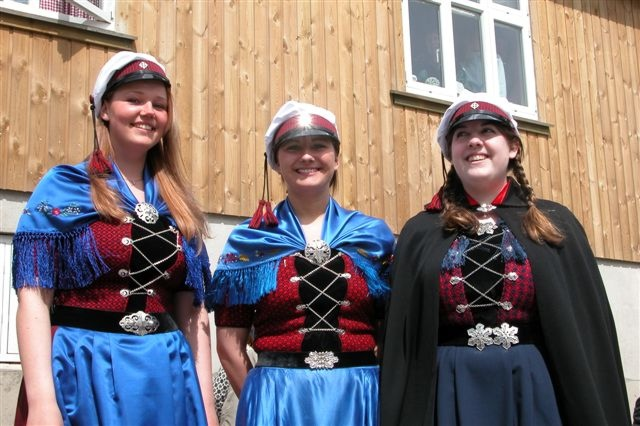
Three Faroese women wearing traditional regalia. The student caps identify them as newly graduated.

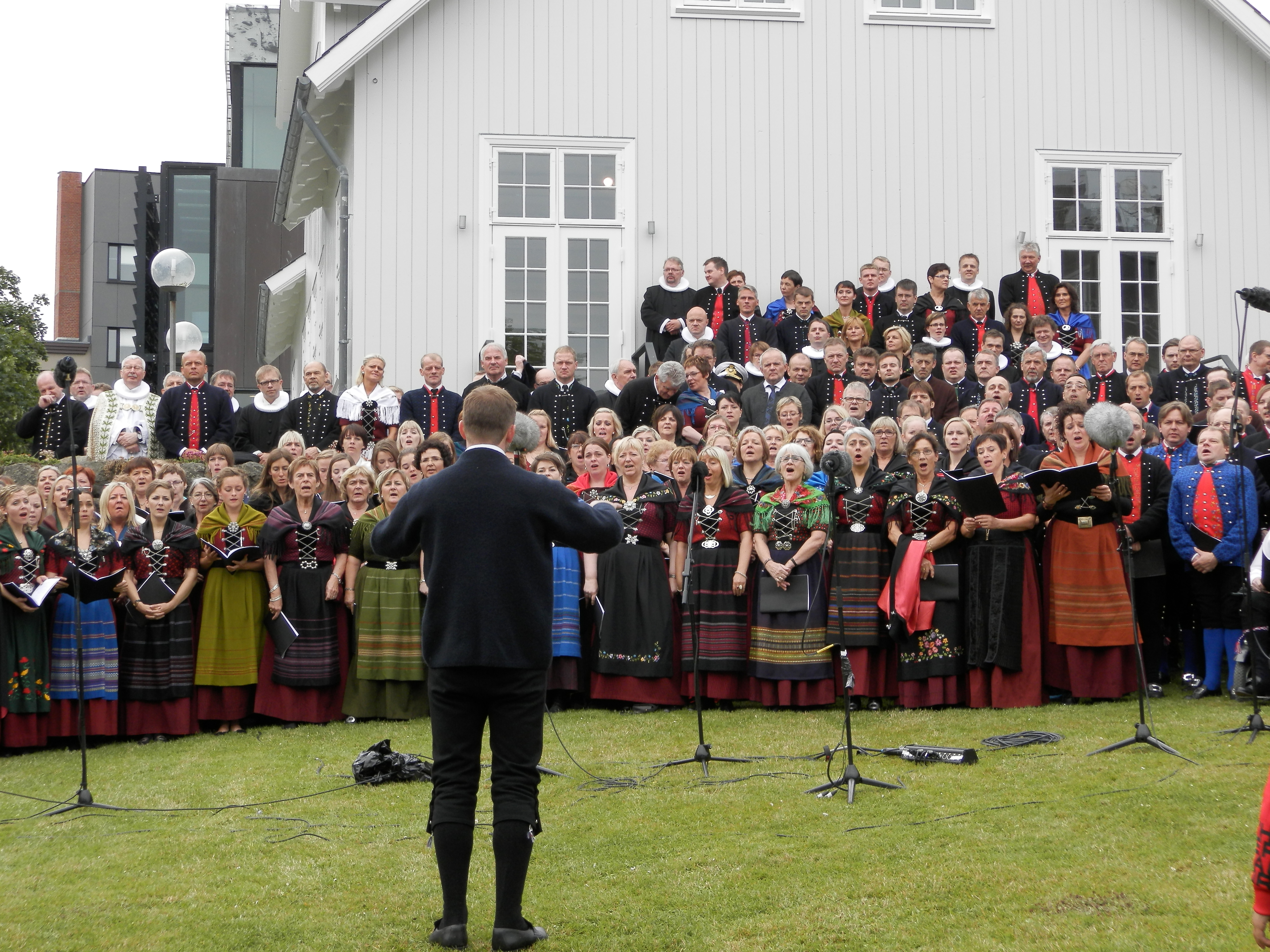
Faroese politicians, priests and choir in front of the Løgting (Parliament), Ólavsøka 2012

The first known settlers of the Faroe Islands were Gaelic hermits and monks who arrived in the 6th century.

The Norse-Gaels started going to the island in the ninth century; they brought Norse culture and language to the islands with them. Little is known about this period, thus giving room for speculation. A single source mentions early settlement, the Icelandic Færeyinga saga. It was written sometime around 1200 and explains events taking place approximately 300 years prior. According to the saga, many Norsemen objected to the Norwegian king, Harald Fairhair's unification politics and thus fled to other countries, including the newfound places in the west.

Historians have understood since the time of the Færeyinga saga that the Viking Grímur Kamban was the first settler in the Faroes. The Norwegians must have known about the isles before leaving Norway. If Grímur Kamban had settled sometime earlier, this could explain the Norwegians' knowledge of them. Another, more logical explanation might be that the Gaels of Scotland and Ireland told the Norwegians of the islands.

While Grímur is an Old Norse first name, Kamban indicates a Celtic origin. Thus, he could have been a man from Ireland, Scotland or Isle of Man, where the Vikings already had settlements. Some place names from the oldest settlements on the Faroes suggest that some of the settlers perhaps came from the Scottish islands and the British coast.

Y chromosomes, tracing male descent, are 87% Scandinavian, but mitochondrial DNA, tracing female descent, is 84% British.

== See also ==
- List of Faroese people
- Demographics of the Faroe Islands
- Culture of the Faroe Islands
- Flag of the Faroe Islands
- Faroese Dane
