= Kirkjubøargarður =

Farm with wooden houses dating back to the 11th century

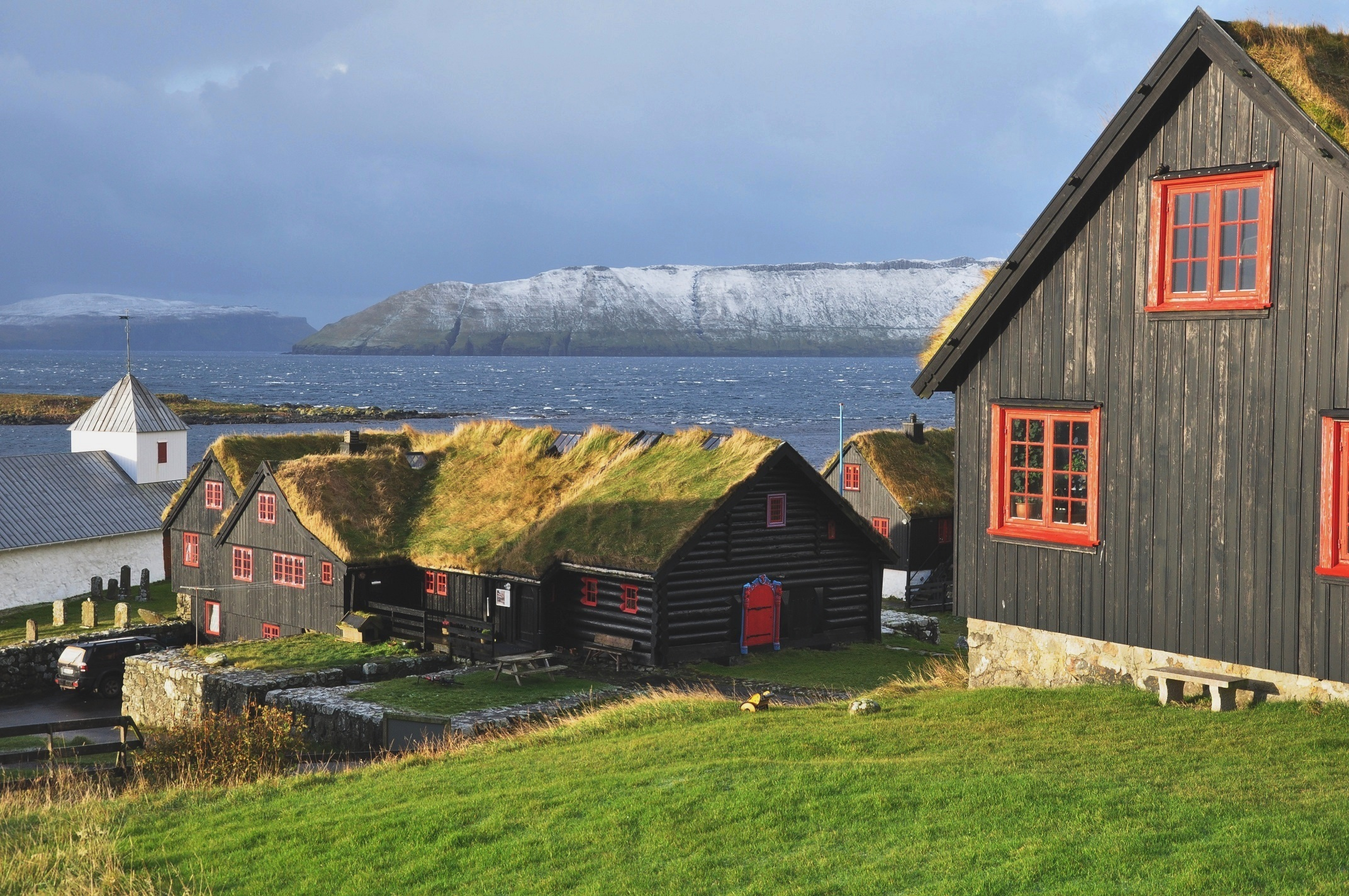
- Kirkjubøargarður with Hestur and Sandoy in the background.

- Location within Denmark Faroe Islands

General information
- Type: Farmhouse
- Location: Kirkjubøur, Faroe Islands
- Coordinates: 61°57′7″N 6°47′34″W
- Elevation: 2 m (7 ft)
- Current tenants: Patursson family
- Completed: c. 1100 (age 926)
- Owner: Faroese government

Website
- patursson.fo

Kirkjubøargarður (Faroese for Yard of Kirkjubøur, also known as King's Farm) is one of the oldest still inhabited wooden houses in the world. The farm itself has always been the largest in the Faroe Islands.

The old farmhouse of Kirkjubøur dates back to the 11th century. It was the episcopal residence and seminary of the Diocese of the Faroe Islands, from about 1100. The legend says that the wood for the block houses came as driftwood from Norway and was accurately bundled and numbered, just for being set up. Note that there is no forest in the Faroes, with the exception of a wood in northern Tórshavn, and wood is a very valuable material. Many such wood legends are thus to be found in Faroese history.

The oldest part is a so-called roykstova (reek parlour, or smoke room). Perhaps it was moved one day, because it does not fit to its foundation. Another ancient room is the loftstovan (loft room). It is supposed that Bishop Erlendur wrote the 'Sheep Letter' here in 1298. This is the earliest document of the Faroes we know today. It is the statute concerning sheep breeding on the Faroes. Today the room is the farm's library. The stórastovan (large room) is from a much later date, being built in 1772.

Though the farmhouse is a museum, the 17th generation of the Patursson family, which has occupied it since 1550, still lives there. Shortly after the Reformation in the Faroe Islands in 1538, all the real estate of the Catholic Church was seized by the King of Denmark. This was about half of the land in the Faroes, and since then called "King's Land" (kongsjørð). The largest piece of King's Land was the farm in Kirkjubøur due to the above-mentioned episcopal residence. This land is today owned by the Faroese government, and the Paturssons are tenants from generation to generation. It is always the oldest son who becomes King's Farmer, and in contrast to the privately owned land, the King's Land is never divided between the sons.

The farm holds sheep, cattle and some horses. It is possible to get a coffee here and buy fresh mutton and beef directly from the farmer. In the winter season there is also hare hunting for the locals. Groups can rent the roykstovan for festivities and will be served original Faroese cuisine.

Other notable buildings near the farmhouse are the Magnus Cathedral and Saint Olav's Church, which also date back to the medieval period.

== People ==
Notable people who were born here or lived here for a period:

- Sverre I of Norway (1151–1202), grew up here and went to the priest school.
- Bishop Erlendur (d. 1308), wrote the Sheep Letter and built the Magnus Cathedral.
- Súsanna Helena Patursson (1864–1916), first feminist of the Faroes.
- King's farmer Jóannes Patursson (1866–1946), oldest brother of Helena, nationalist leader and writer.
- Sverre Patursson (1871–1960) brother of Helena and Jóannes, writer, journalist and environmentalist.
- Erlendur Patursson (1913–1986), son of Jóannes, writer and nationalist politician.
- Tróndur Patursson (born 1944), great-grandson of Jóannes, artist and adventurer.

== Images ==
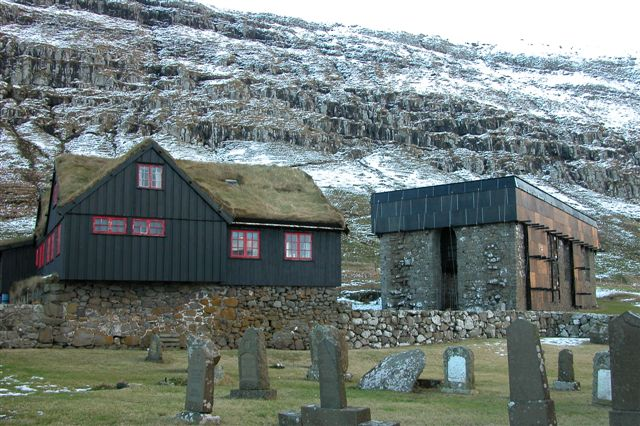
On the left: Kirkjubøargarður; on the right the ruin of Magnus Cathedral

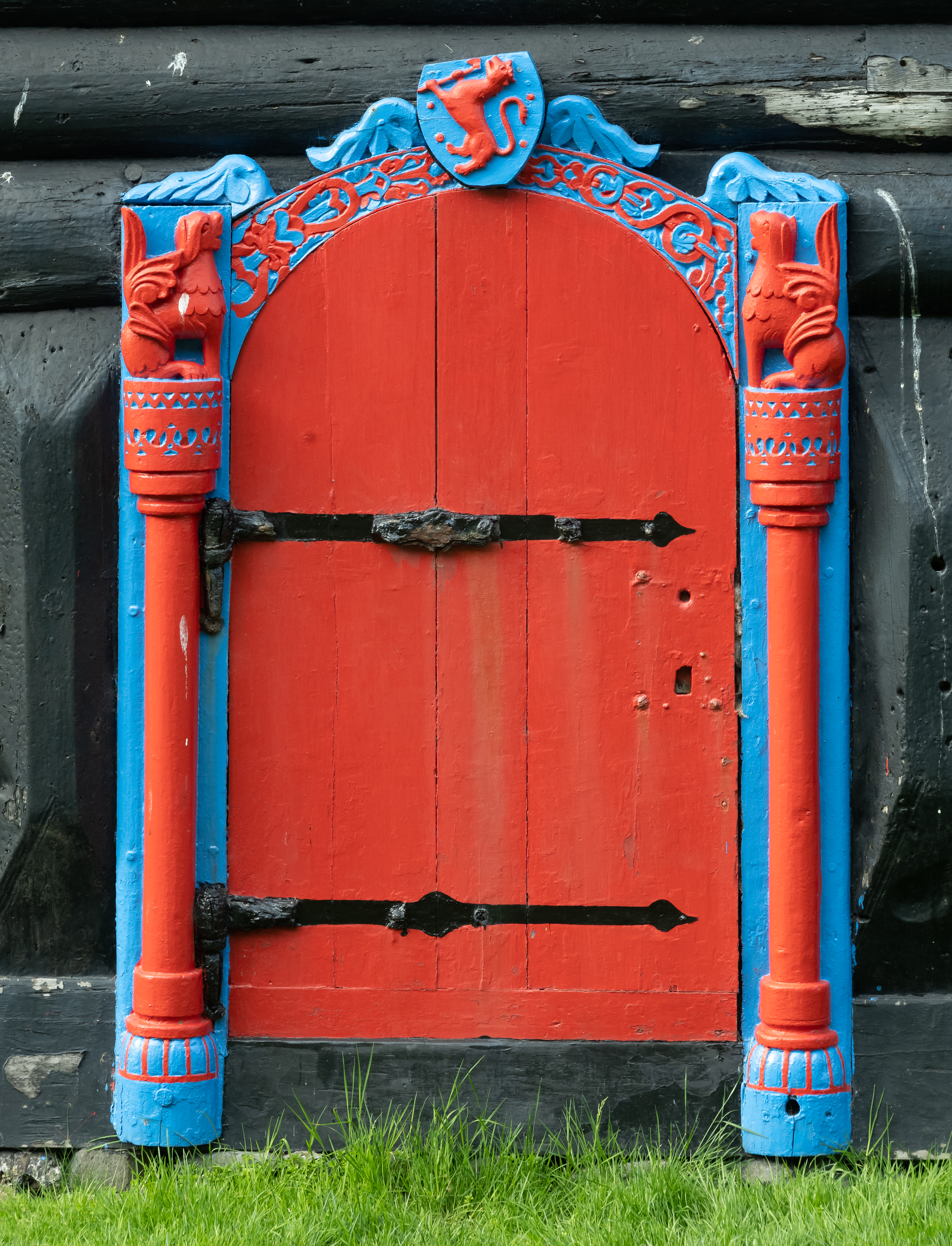
The entrance of Roykstovan was destroyed in 1833. This true to original copy was timbered and carved by the King's Farmer Jóannes Patursson in 1907. On the top is the Norwegian Lion, indicating that the Faroes were a Norwegian colony after the Viking age.

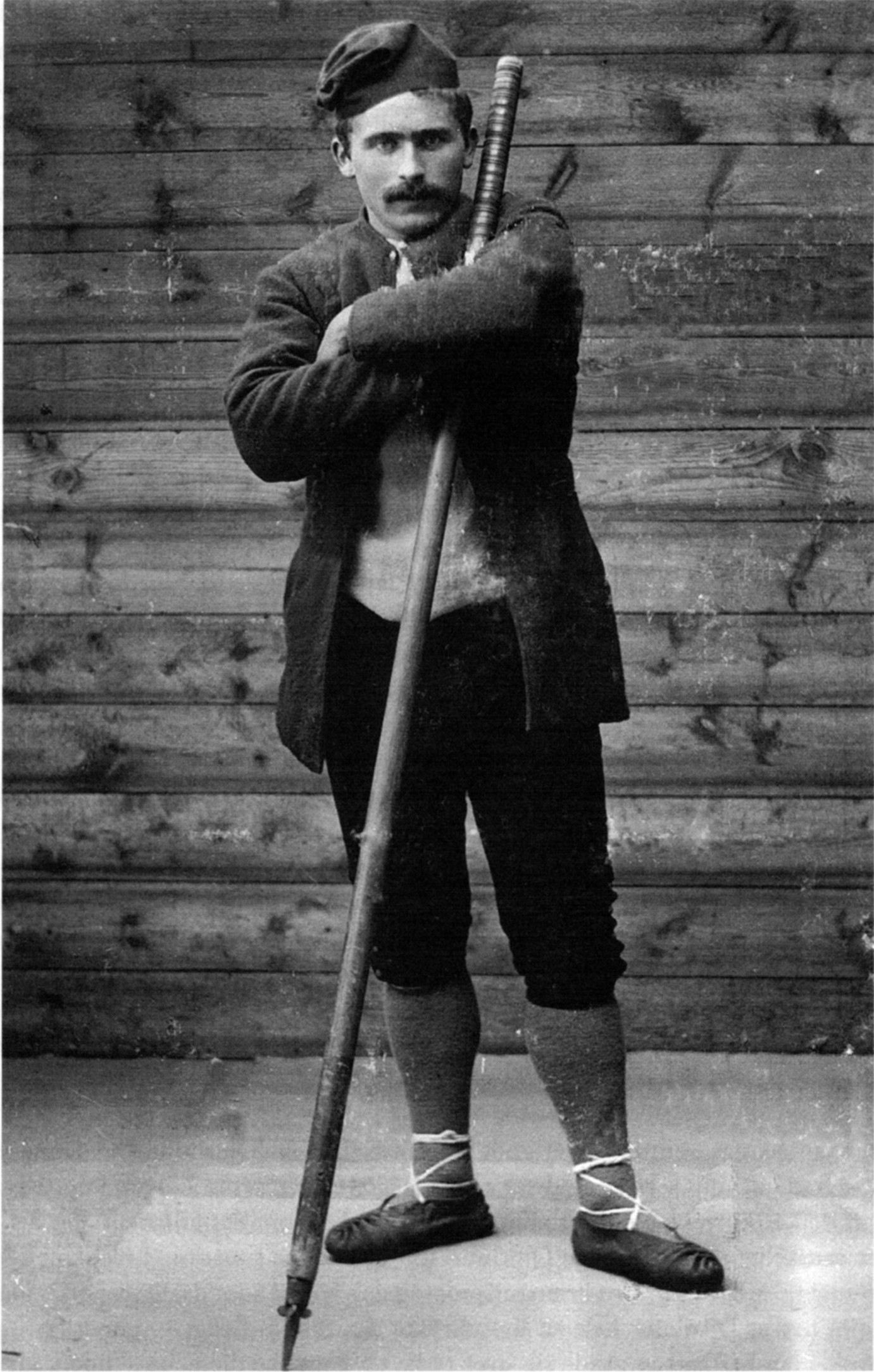
Jóannes Patursson (1866–1946), Faroese politician, poet and farmer

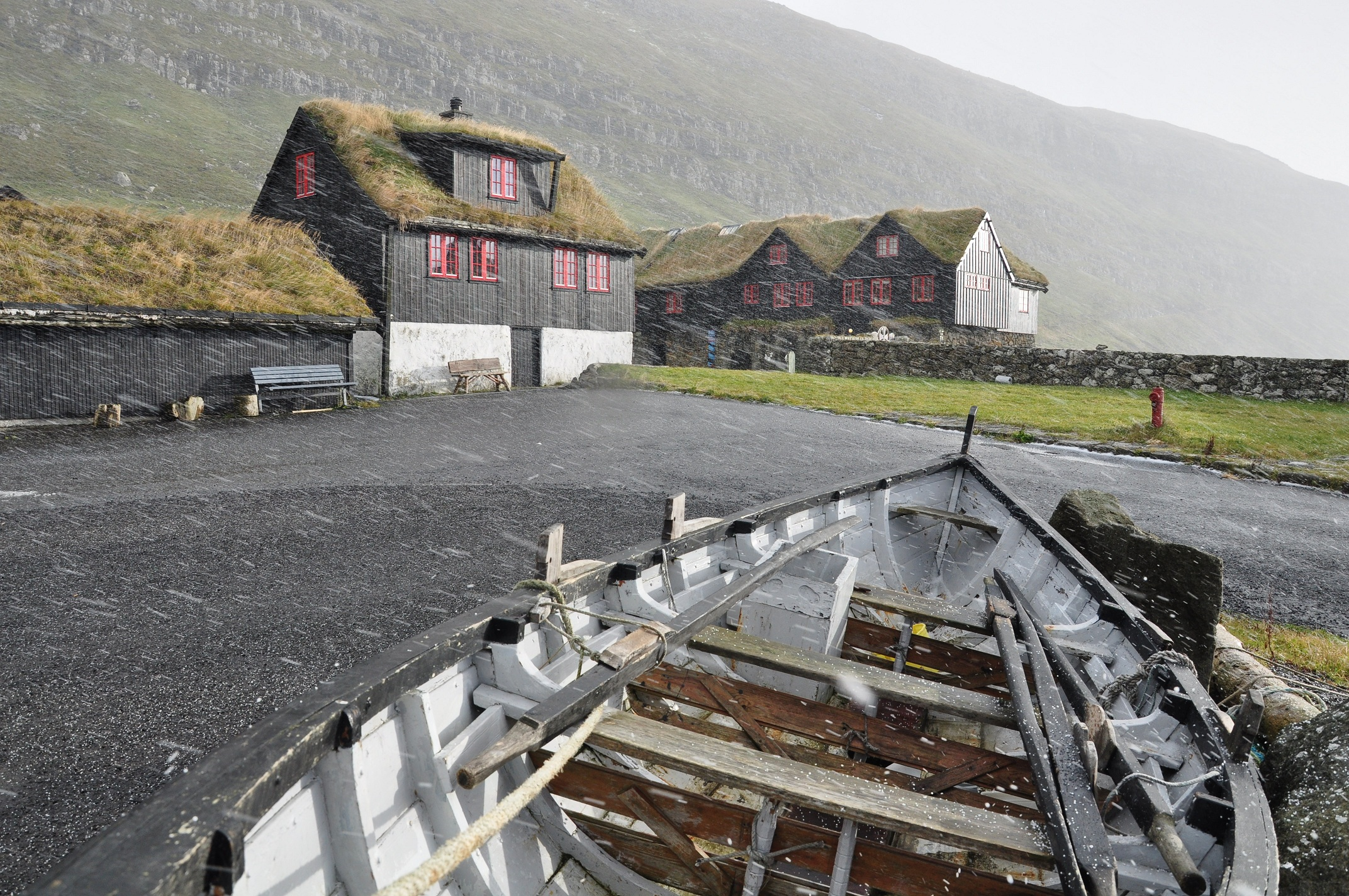
Kirkjubøargarður (on the right) during a blizzard
