= Patursson =

Patursson is a surname. Notable people with the surname include:

- Erlendur Patursson (1913–1986), Faroese politician and writer
- Helena Patursson (1864–1916), Faroese actress, writer and political feminist
- Jóannes Patursson (1866–1946), Faroese nationalist leader and poet
- Sverri Patursson (1871–1960, Faroese writer, author, and journalist
- Rói Patursson (born 1947), Faroese writer and philosopher
- Tróndur Patursson (born 1944), Faroese painter, sculptor, and glass artist

== See also ==
- Patterson
