= Sheep letter =

Oldest surviving document of the Faroe Islands

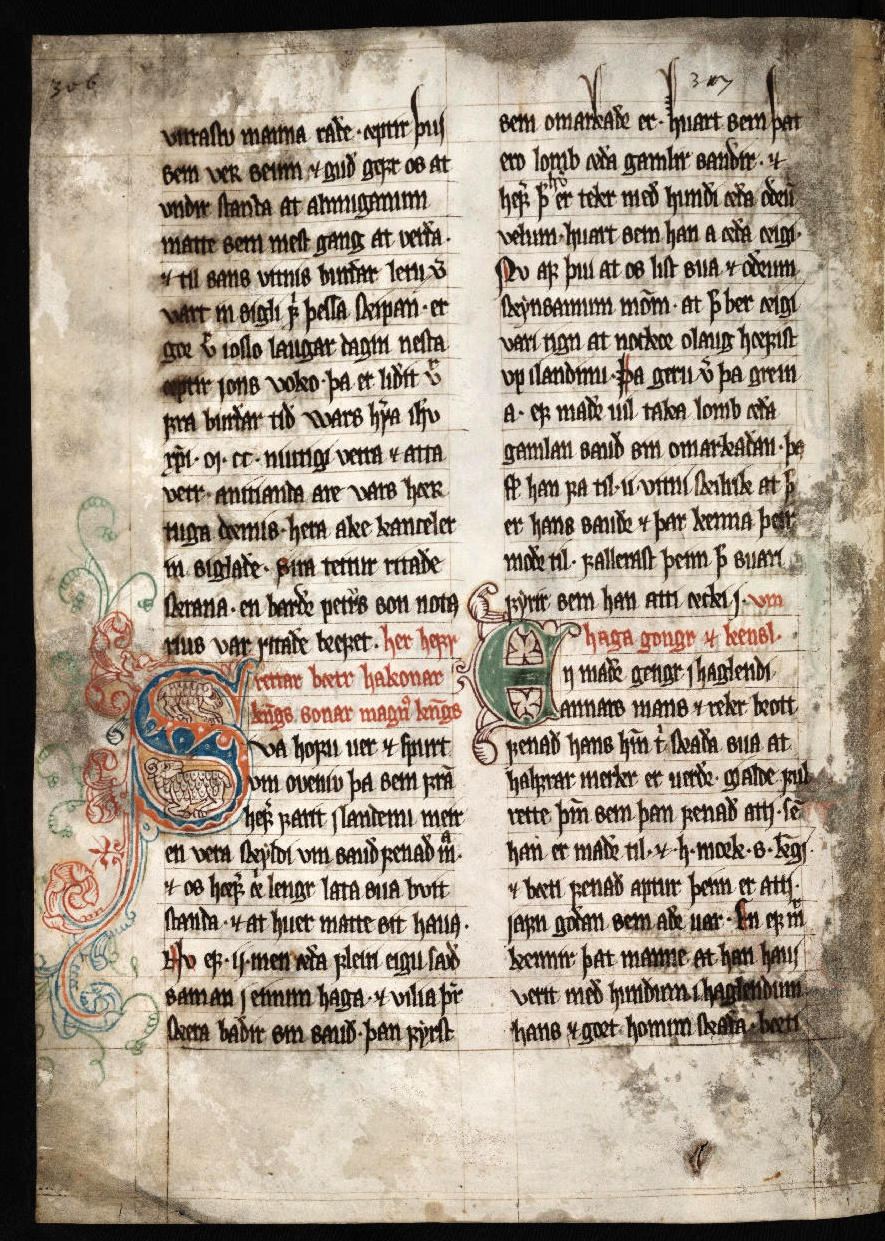
First page of the letter

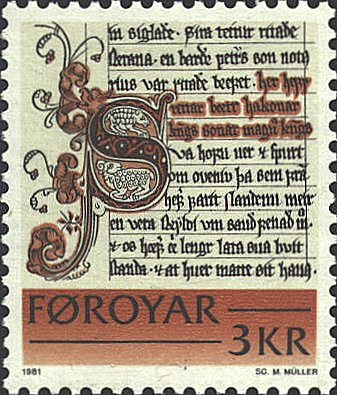
1981 Faroese postage stamp

The Sheep Letter (Faroese: Seyðabrævið, Old Norse: sauðabréfit) is the oldest surviving document of the Faroe Islands. It is a royal decree enacted on 28 June 1298 by Duke Haakon, who later became King Haakon V of Norway. It deals principally with sheep husbandry, but also deals with other matters and functioned as a kind of constitution, removing most administrative power from the local Thing to the king and his representatives. It was drafted on the advice of Erlend, Bishop of the Diocese of the Faroe Islands in Kirkjubøur and of Sjúrður, Lawspeaker of Shetland, whom Duke Haakon had sent to the Faroes to consider the deficiencies in the agricultural law.

In contrast to the Færeyinga saga from Iceland, the Sheep Letter is written on the Faroe Islands and hence gives a better description of the Faroese society at that time. It also shows some early changes that the Faroese language had gone through from Old Norse.

The letter is preserved in two copies; one in the National Archives of the Faroe Islands in Tórshavn and one in the library of Lund University, Sweden.

== 16 points of law mentioned in the Sheep letter ==
1. Concerning how proof of ownership is required before the slaughter of sheep.
2. Concerning trespassing on others' land.
3. Concerning sheep grazing on another man's land.
4. Concerning taming of wild [feral] sheep - part I
5. Concerning the (ear)marking of sheep. It is made very clear that if the first mark is altered then it is considered as theft.
6. Concerning sheep dogs that bite and damage sheep, rules for repayment and the allowed number of sheep on pastureland.
7. Concerning how deadlines are to be handled when authorities give a warning.
8. Concerning duty to report when sheep trespass on strangers' land
9. Concerning taming of wild sheep - part II
10. Concerning the renting of land
11. Concerning unwanted visitors and the rights of the poor.
12. Concerning testimony.
13. Concerning payment for staying visitors
14. Concerning households and tenants.
15. Concerning the finding of whales and the share of meat and blubber.
16. Concerning flotsam
