= Tróndur =

- Gender: Male
- Language: Faroese

Origin
- Region of origin: Faroe Islands

Tróndur is a Faroese masculine given name and may refer to:

- Tróndur Bogason (born 1976), Faroese composer and musician
- Tróndur í Gøtu (c. 945– 1035), Faroese Viking
- Tróndur Patursson (born 1944), Faroese painter, sculptor, glass artist and adventurer
