= Saint Olav's Church, Kirkjubøur =

Medieval church in the village of Kirkjubøur in Streymoy, Faroe Islands

Coordinates: 61°57′6″N 6°47′36″W

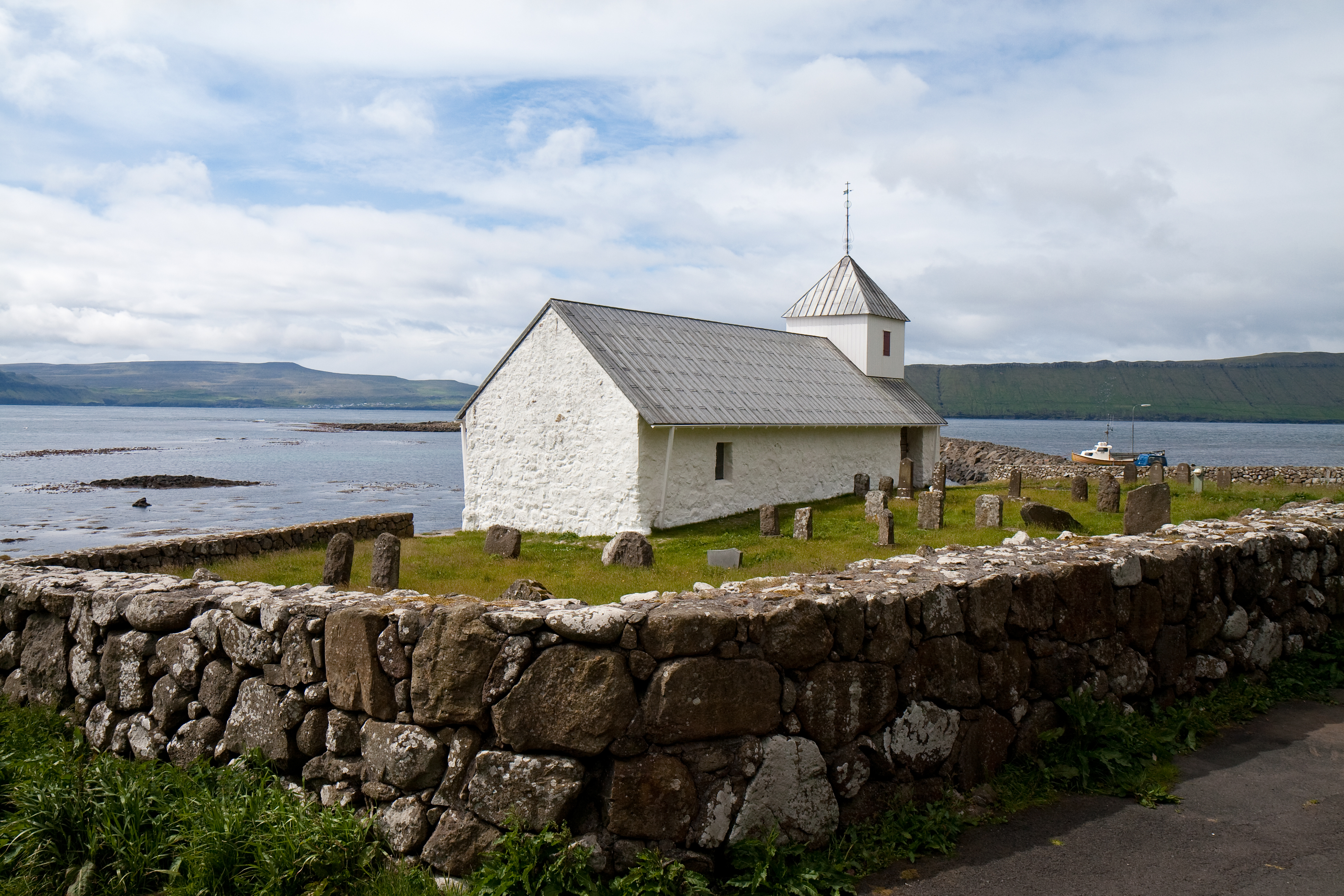
Saint Olav's Church, Kirkjubøur

Saint Olav's Church (Faroese: Ólavskirkjan, Danish: Olavskirken) is a medieval church in the village of Kirkjubøur in Streymoy, Faroe Islands. It was built before 1200, which makes it the oldest church of the Faroe Islands. Until the Reformation, it served as the seat of the Catholic bishop of the Faroe Islands.

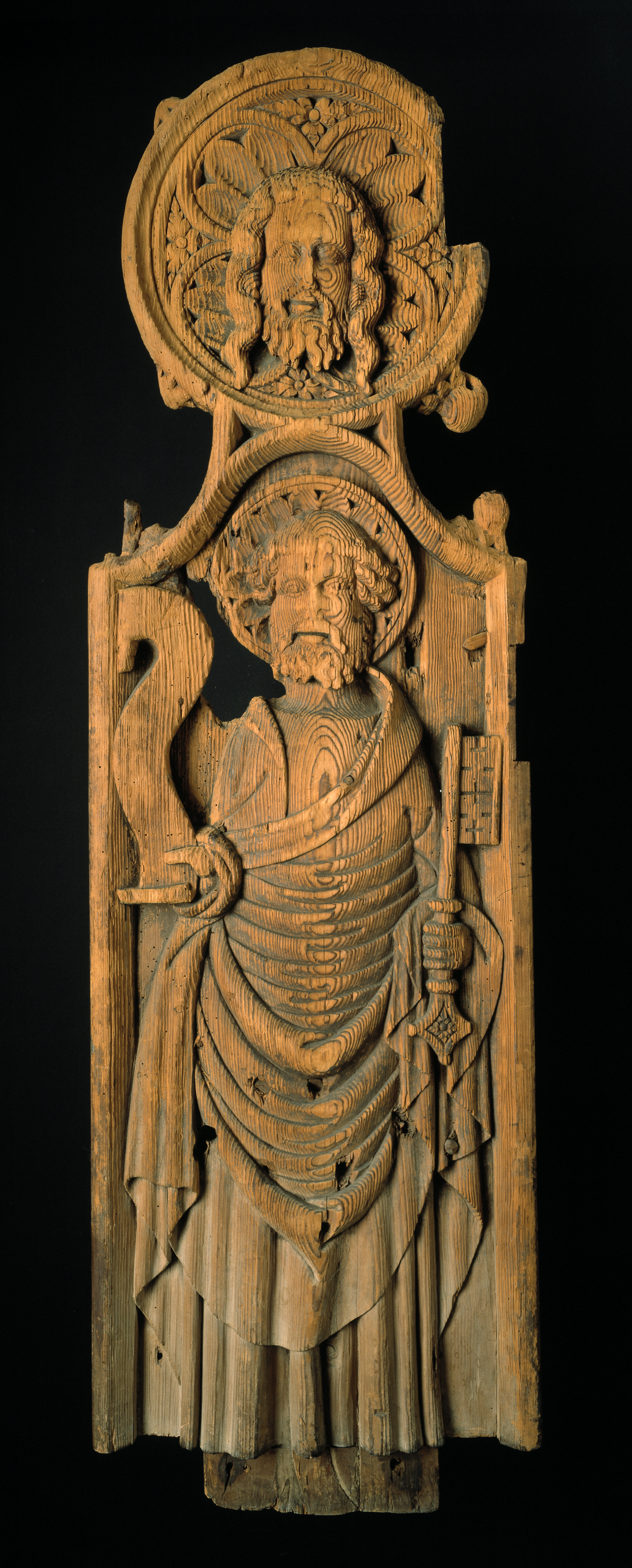
Pew end showing St Peter

The 15th-century pew ends (Faroese: Kirkjubøstólarnir) from the church were transferred in 1875, after the church was restored, to the National Museum of Denmark in Copenhagen. They were returned to the Faroe Islands and exhibited at the National Museum of the Faroe Islands in 2002 where they are amongst the most valued cultural items of the National Museum. There are 14 pew ends, 11 depicting the Apostles, and the three remaining ones depicting other Biblical figures. They were on several occasions featured on postal stamps — in 1980 (4 stamps), in 1984 (4 stamps), and in 2001 (4 stamps).

A runestone, the Kirkjubøur stone, was found in 1832 in the church. It is now in the National Museum of the Faroe Islands.

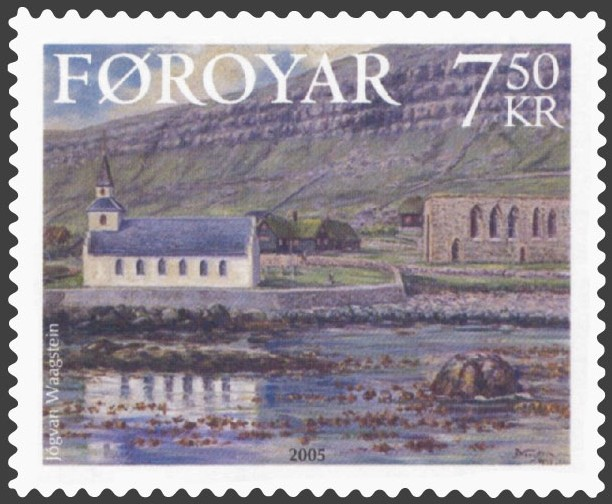
Faroese postage stamp

== See also ==
- Magnus Cathedral
