= National Library of the Faroe Islands =

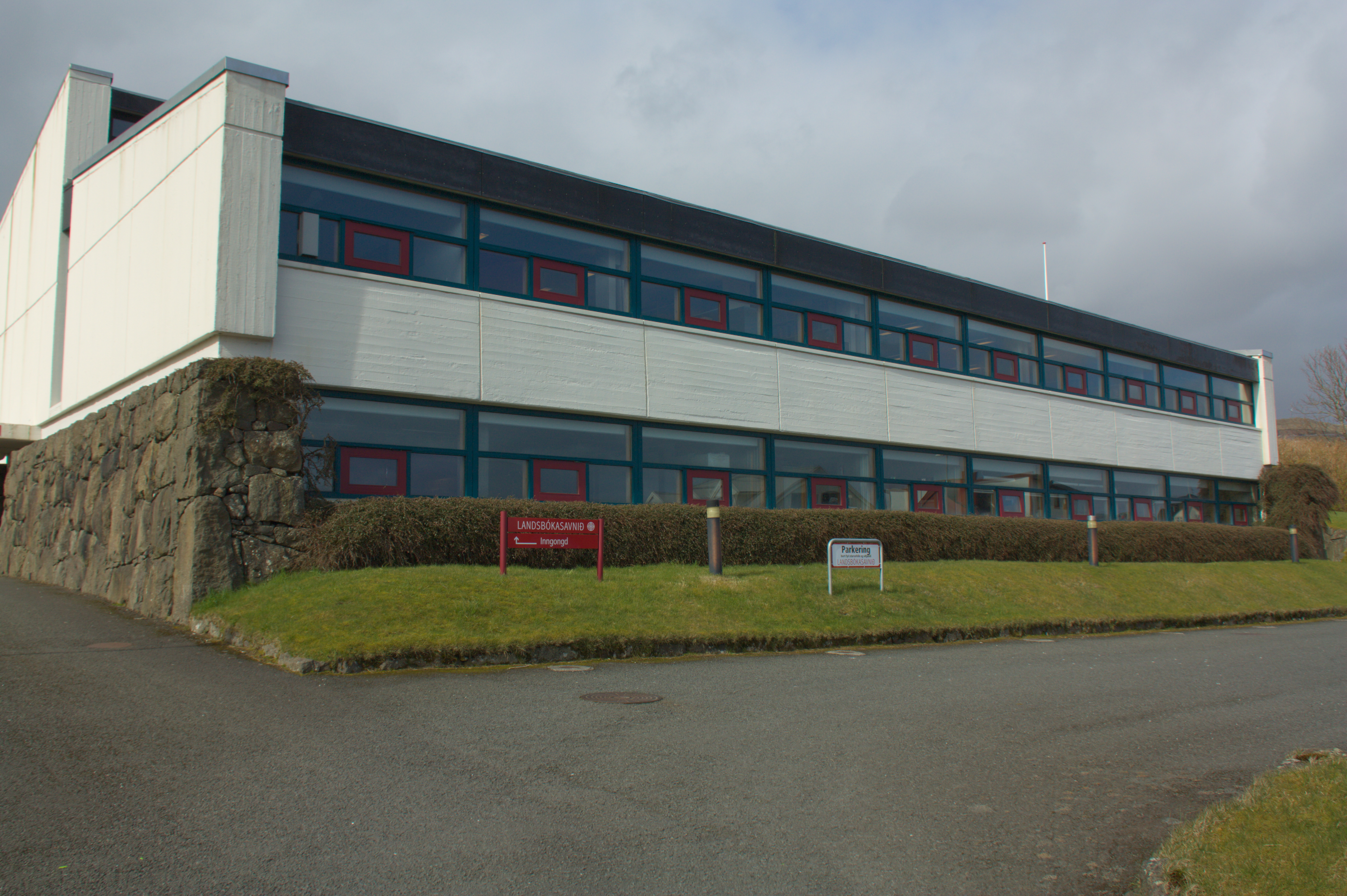
The National Library of the Faroe Islands

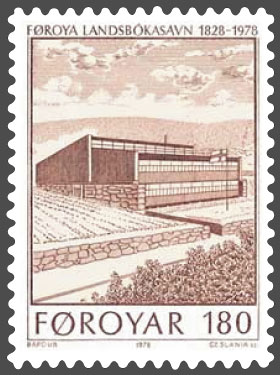
National Library of the Faroe Islands, on a 1978 stamp

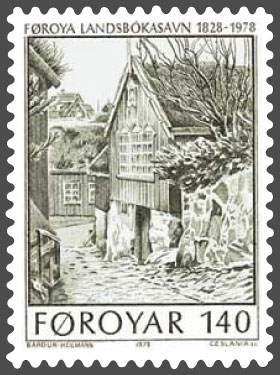
Original library building, from a 1937 painting by Flora Heilmann

The National Library of the Faroe Islands (Faroese: Føroya Landsbókasavn) is the national library for the Faroe Islands, a self-governing country within the Kingdom of Denmark. It is both a public and a research library.

The library houses the largest collection of works written in Faroese, works written by Faroese in other languages or translated by them, and works written about the Faroe Islands.

== History ==
The library began in 1828, when the Danish Amtmaður (governor) Christian Ludvig Tillisch (in office 1825–30) and his Amtsrevisor Jens Davidsen began assembling books for a Færø Amts Bibliotek (Danish, 'Faroe County Library'). They were assisted by the Danish scholar Carl Christian Rafn and by private citizens, and on 5 November 1828 secured an annual grant of funds from the King. In 1831, the collection included 2,860 volumes.

The library acquired its own building in 1830, and Jens Davidsen served as librarian until his death in 1878. By 1850 there were approximately 5,000 books, but the project stagnated between 1878 and 1905, when the Faroese parliament, the Løgting, assigned funding. The library flourished beginning in 1921, under the linguist Mads Andreas Jacobsen (1891–1944), who had trained as a librarian in 1920. During the period of the Faroese language conflict, it became a rallying point for national writers and politicians. It moved into a new building in 1931.

After the achievement of home rule in 1948, the Løgting greatly increased financial support for the library and its official name became Faroese. The library underwent renewed expansion and under a law passed on 16 June 1952 is a depository library: publishers are legally required to deposit four copies of all printed materials in the collection.

Since 24 September 1980 the library has been housed at J. C. Svabosgøta 16 on Viðarlundin á Debesartrøð park, in a purpose-built building designed by Jákup Pauli Gregoriussen.

In 2011, as a cost-saving measure, the National Library was administratively combined with the National Archives of the Faroe Islands, the National Museum of the Faroe Islands, the Natural History Museum of the Faroe Islands, and the Kaldbak Marine Biological Laboratory (Faroese: Havlívfrøðiliga Royndarstøðin) to form Faroese National Heritage (Faroese: Søvn Landsins).

As of December 2013 there are also 18 municipal and 13 school libraries in the country, which are primarily managed by the National Library (the first municipal library to be founded was that in Klaksvík, in the 1950s). In addition, the Art Museum and some other institutions have their own libraries.

== See also ==
- List of national libraries
- List of libraries in Denmark
