= Kirkjubøur =

Kirkjubøur Kirkebø
- Village
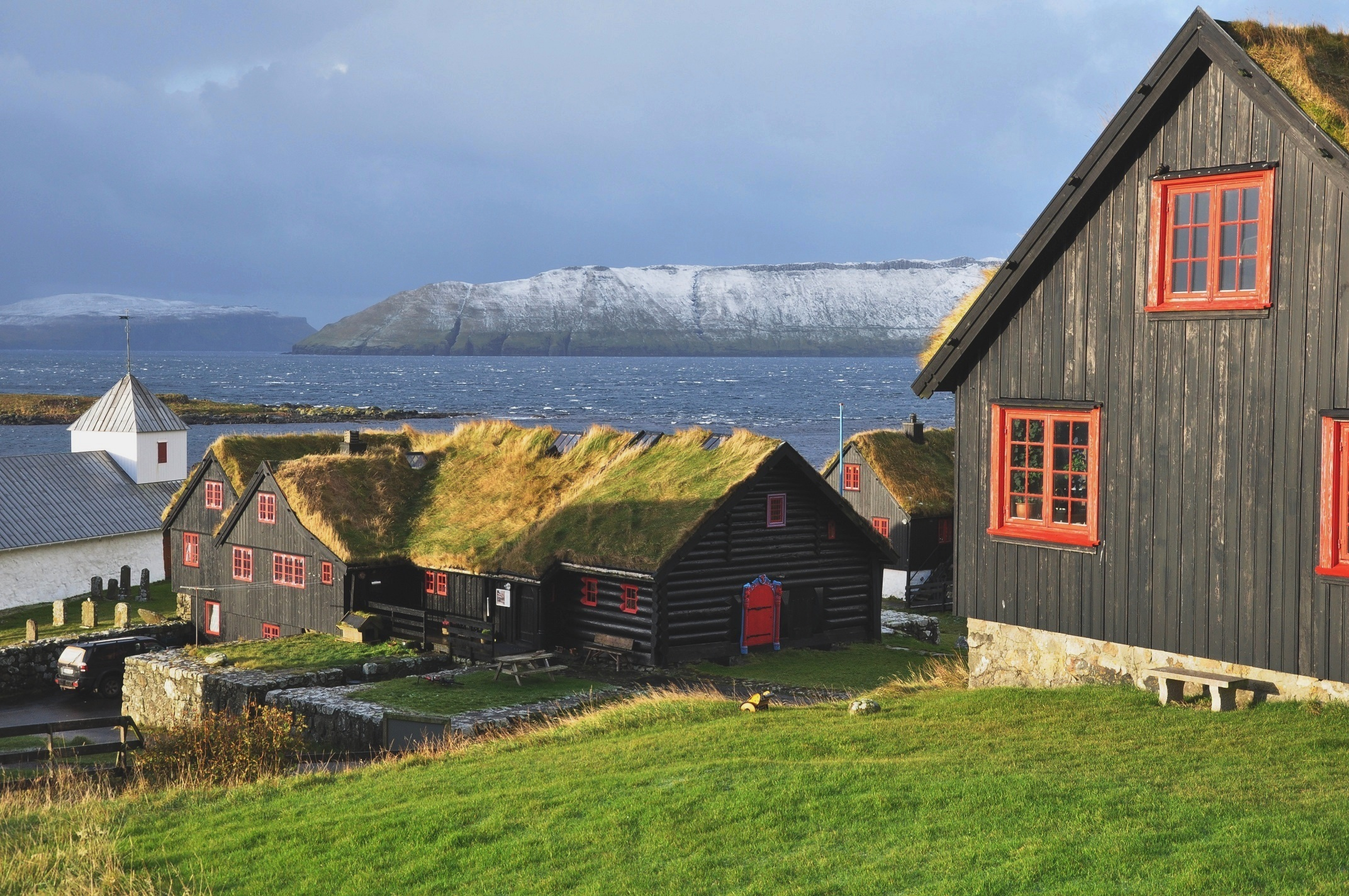
- Saint Olav's Church, Kirkjubøur at the left, and the old farmhouse of Kirkjubøargarður at the centre. In the background are the islands of Sandoy and Hestur.

- Location in the Faroe Islands
- Coordinates: 61°57′22″N 6°47′37″W
- State: Kingdom of Denmark
- Constituent country: Faroe Islands
- Island: Streymoy
- Municipality: Tórshavn Municipality

Population (September 2025)
  - Total: 75
- Time zone: GMT
  - Summer (DST): UTC+1 (EST)
- Postal code: FO 175
- Climate: Cfc

Kirkjubøur (Danish: Kirkebø) is the southernmost village on Streymoy, Faroe Islands. The village is located on the south-west coast of Streymoy and has a view towards the islands of Hestur and Koltur towards the west, and to Sandoy towards the south. It lies south of the new ferry port of Gamlarætt, which opened in 1993.

The village is the Faroes' most important historical site, with the ruins of the Magnus Cathedral from around 1300, Saint Olav's Church (Olavskirkjan), from the 12th century and the old farmhouse of Kirkjubøargarður from the 11th century. In 1832, a runestone was found near the Magnus Cathedral in Kirkjubøur. The stone which is referred to as the Kirkjubøur stone dates back to the Viking Age.

The little islet just of the coast, Kirkjubøhólmur, contains an eider duck colony. To the village belongs the islet of Trøllhøvdi, just 100m off the northern tip of Sandoy 9 km away from Kirkjubøur. It was given as payment to the villagers, as it was their duty to ferry people across to Sandoy in medieval times.

== History ==
The village was important in the Middle Ages. At that time it was the episcopal residence for the Diocese of the Faroe Islands and as such the spiritual centre of the society. In those days the village is said to have had around 50 houses. The majority of these houses were washed away by a fierce storm in 1602, which created the islet Kirkjubøhólmurin, which contains ruins from that time. It is speculated that the church located the diocese in Kirkjubø, to counter the heathen Vé in Velbastaður only 5 km to the north west up the coast.

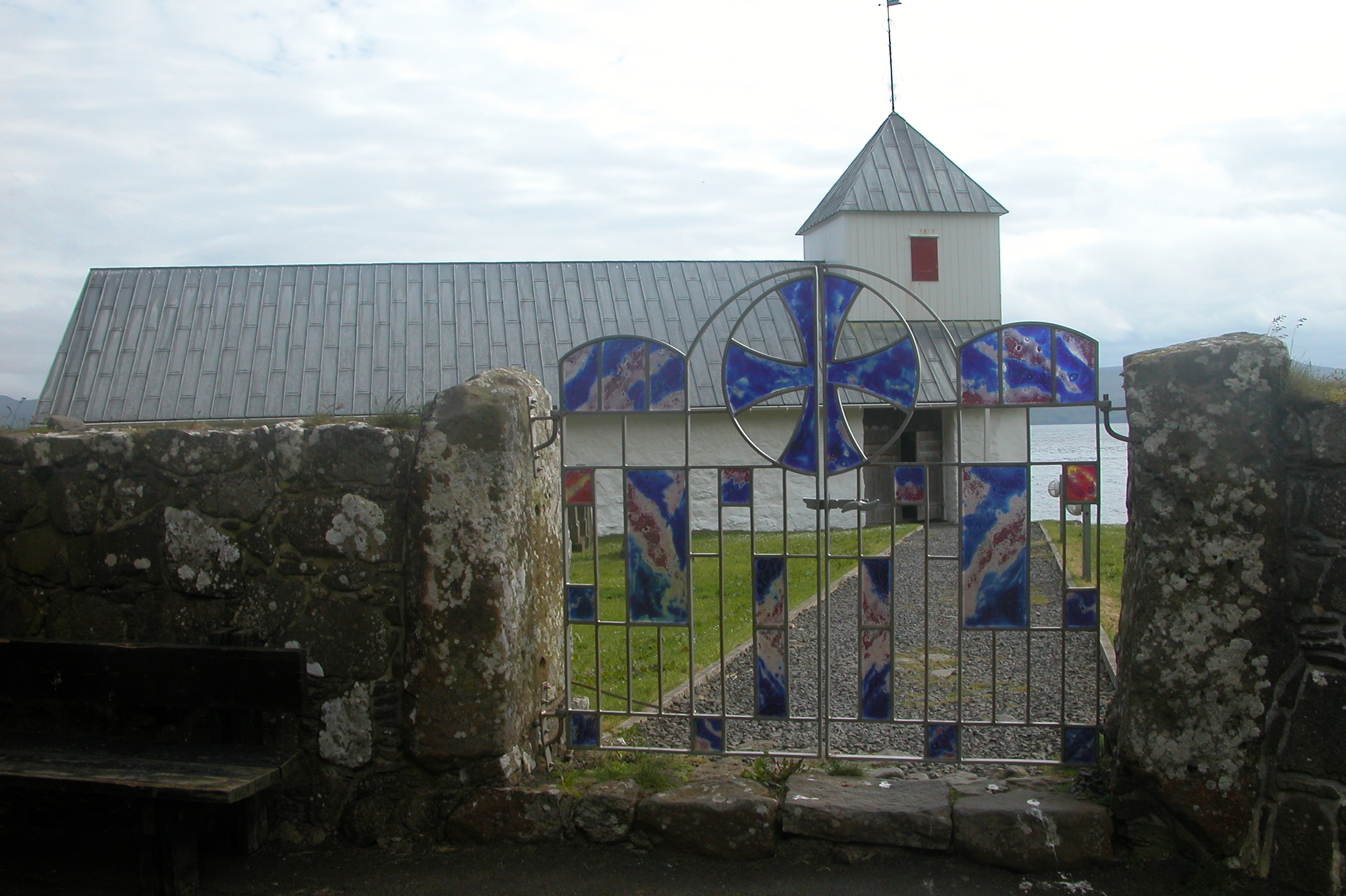
Saint Olav's Church

There are three main attractions from this time:

- Magnus Cathedral ruins from about 1300.
- Saint Olav's Church, the oldest still used church of the Faroes dating from 12th century.
- Kirkjubøargarður, the oldest still inhabited wooden house of the world from 11th century.

== Notable residents ==
- Sverre I of Norway (1151–1202), grew up here.
- Bishop Erlendur (?-1308), who built the Magnus Cathedral and wrote the Sheep letter, the oldest document of the country.
- Súsanna Helena Patursson (1864–1916), first feminist of the Faroes.
- Jóannes Patursson (1866–1946), nationalist leader and writer.
- Sverri Patursson (1871–1960), writer, journalist and environmentalist.
- Erlendur Patursson (1913–1986), writer and nationalist politician.
- Tróndur Patursson (b. 1944), artist and adventurer.

== Kirkjubøur chairs ==
The medieval carved pew ends from Saint Olav's Church are now to be found in the National Museum of the Faroe Islands. These were featured in three series of Faroese stamps, engraved by Czeslaw Slania. For the full series, see here.

== Gallery ==
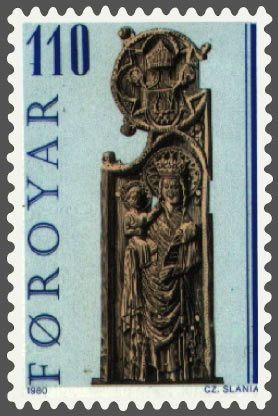
Mediaeval carved pew ends from Saint Olav's Church

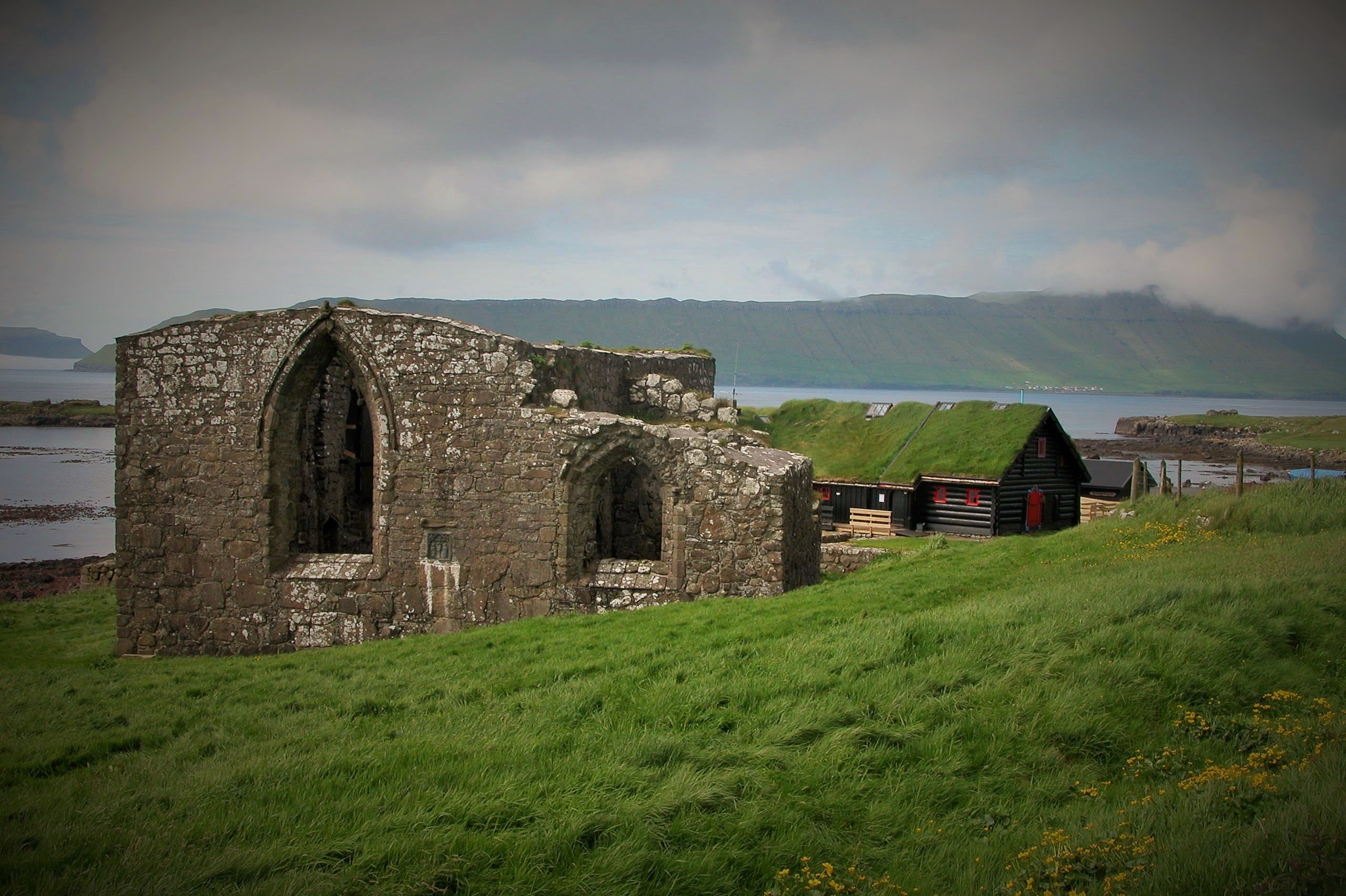
Ruins of Magnus Cathedral

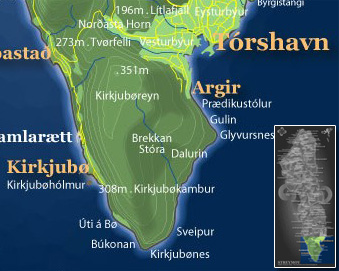
Map showing the position of Kirkjubøur on Streymoy

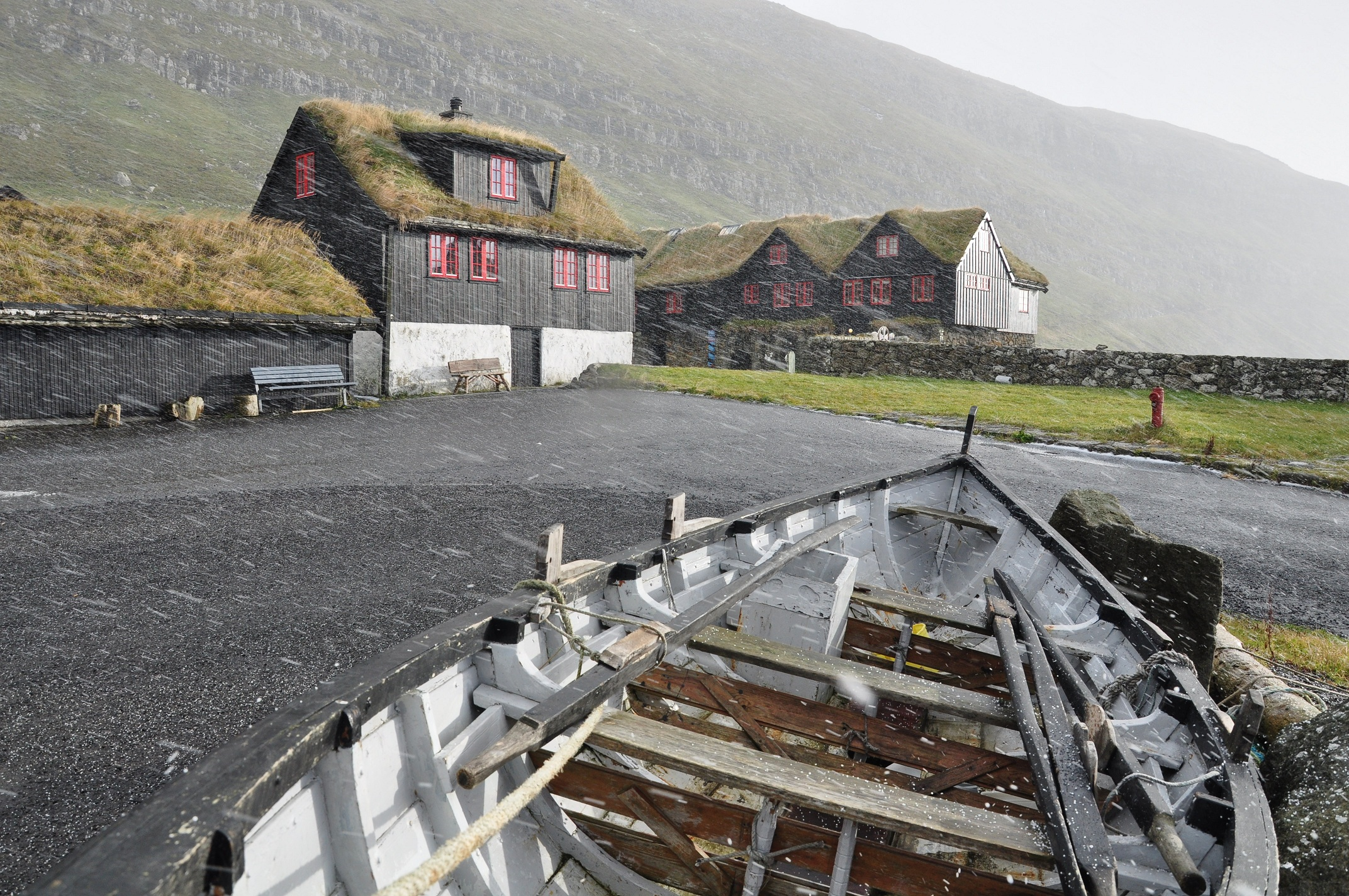
A blizzard in Kirkjubøur

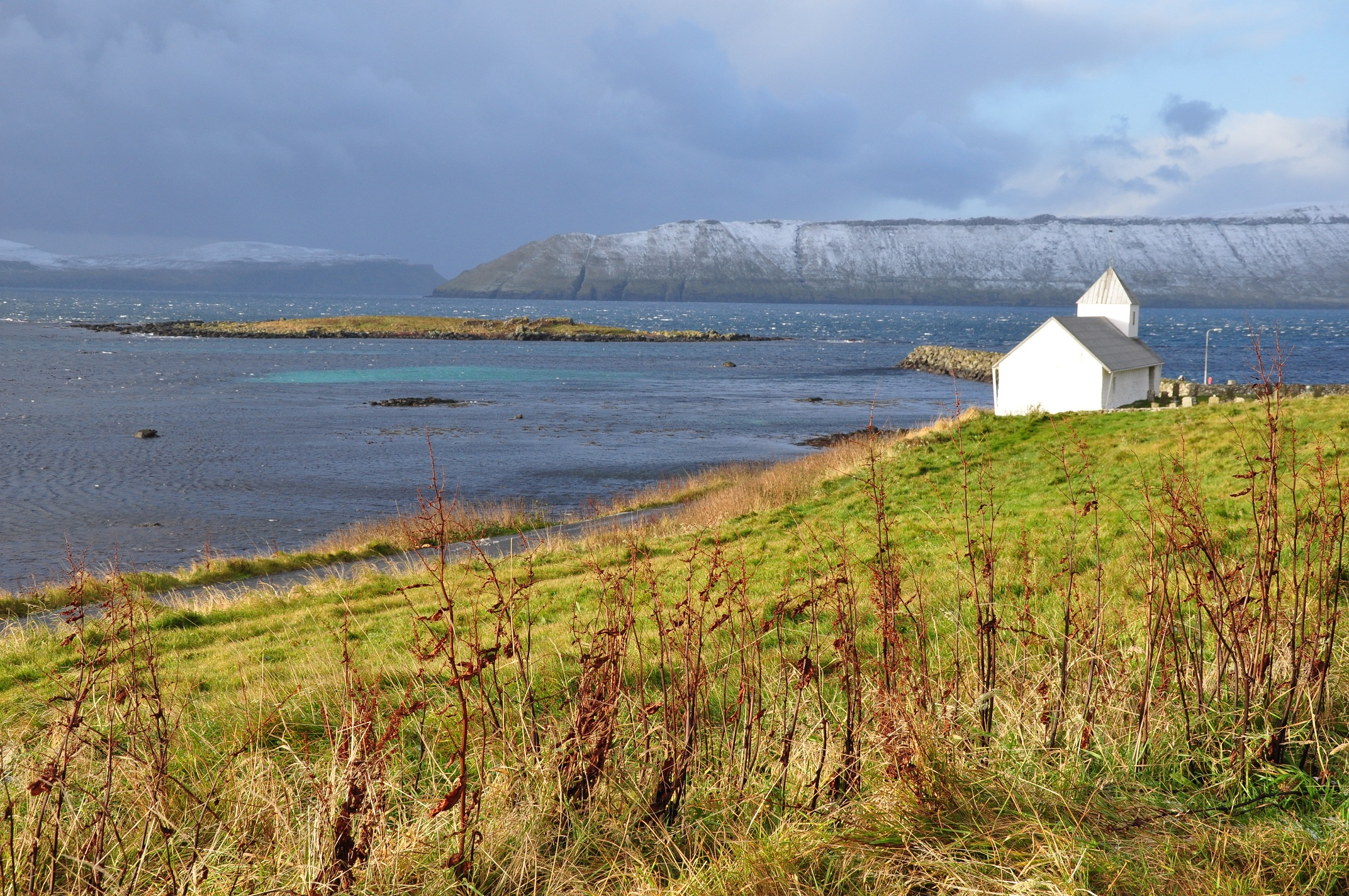
Islet of Kirkjubøhólmur and Saint Olav's Church. Island of Hestur in the distance

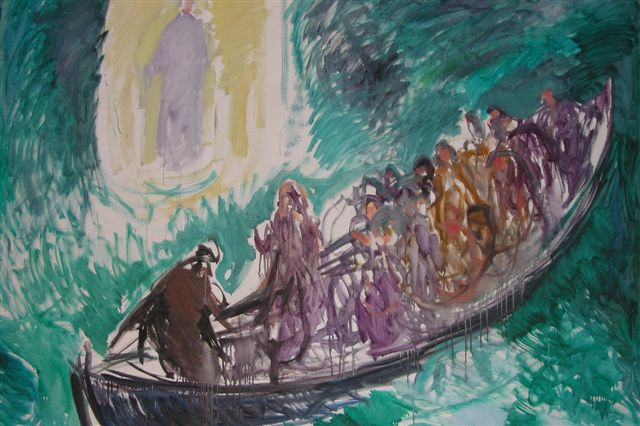
Kirkjubøur painting by Sámal Joensen-Mikines in Saint Olav's Church

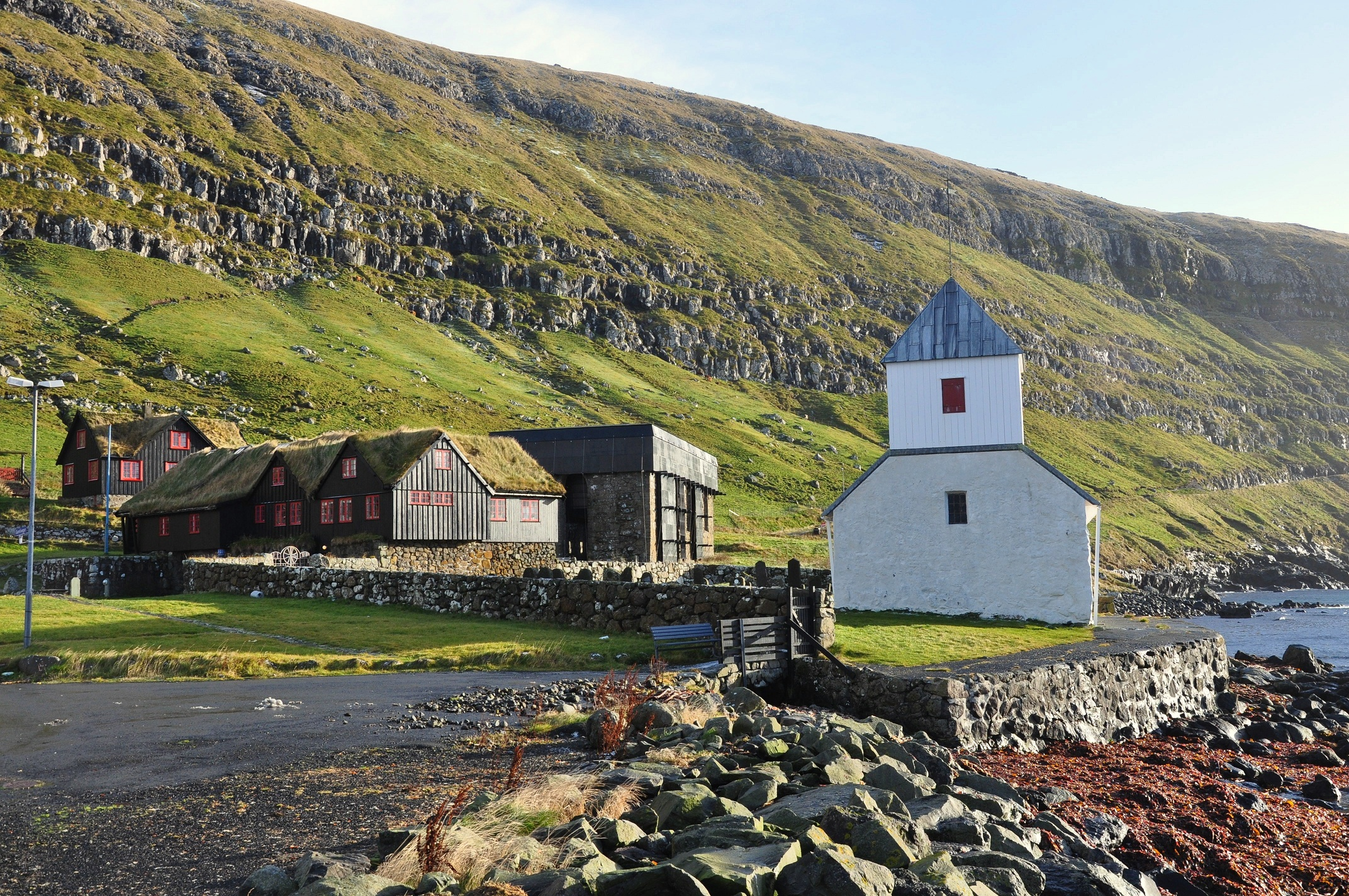
Kirkjubøargarður (left), Ruins of Magnus Cathedral (center), Saint Olav's Church (right)

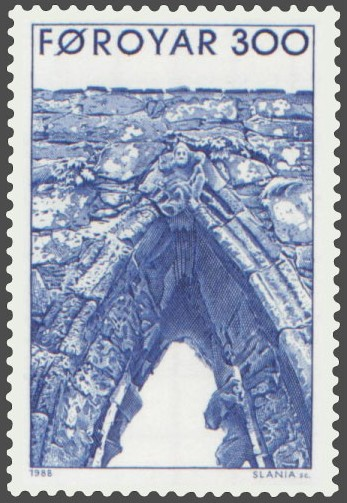
Detail of Magnus Cathedral ruins

== See also ==
- List of towns in the Faroe Islands
