= National Museum of the Faroe Islands =

Museum of the Faroe Islands

Coordinates: 62°01′56″N 6°45′54″W

The Faroe Islands National Museum (Faroese: Tjóðsavnið, Danish: Færøernes Nationalmuseum) is the national museum of the Faroe Islands, located in Tórshavn.

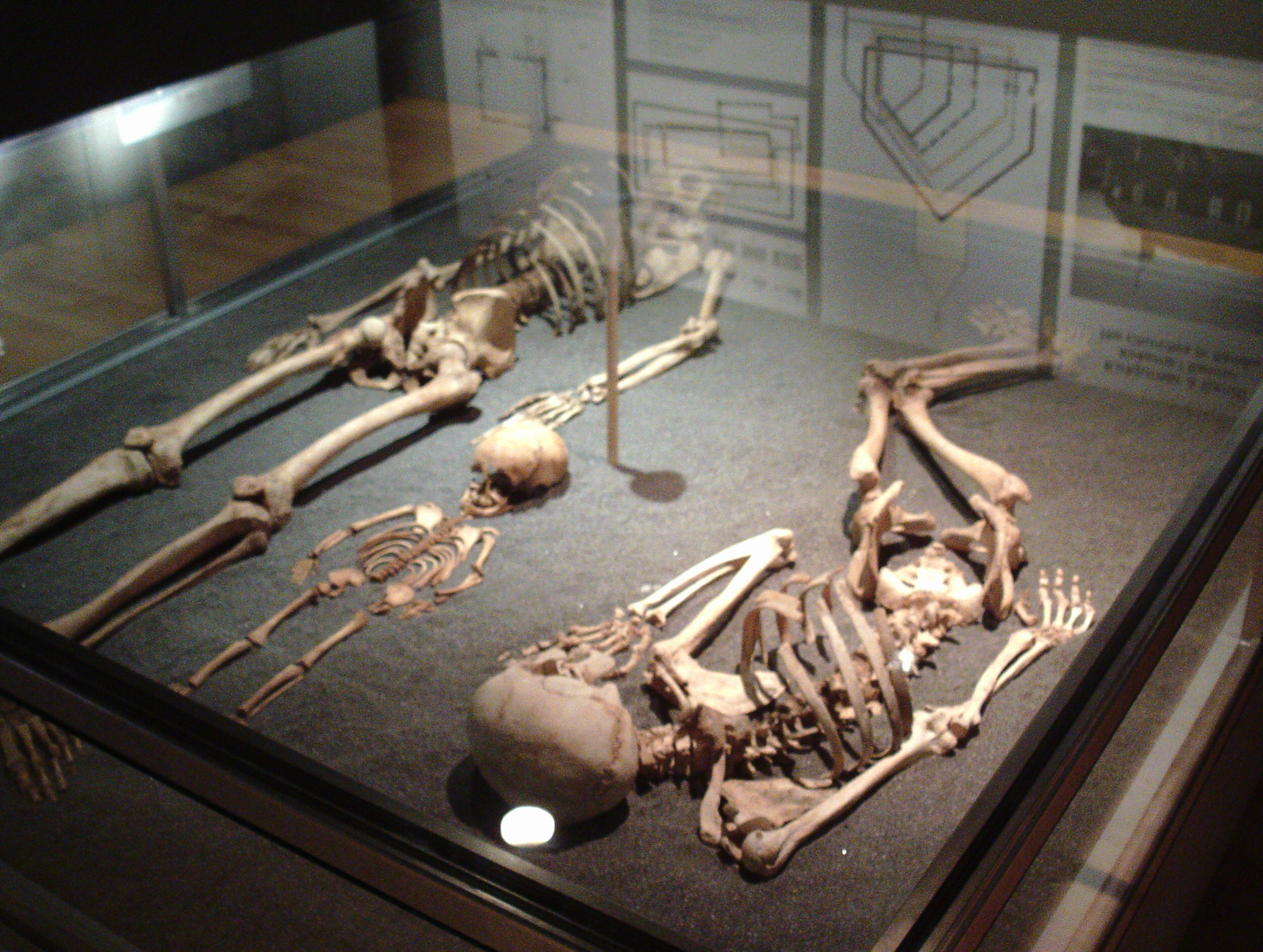
Excavated skeletons of man, woman, and infant on display at the Faroese National Museum, Tórshavn

== The exhibition at Brekkutún 6 ==
The Faroe Islands National Museum has exhibitions in the museum building at Brekkutún 6 in Tórshavn. The galleries tell the natural and cultural history of the Faroe Islands. This stretches from the origin of the landmass dating back 65 million years, through the pre-settlement era and the culture of the Viking Ages and the Middle Ages. Displays include rocks and minerals, birds, plants and fish, as well as items from the farming life and the maritime life in the Faroe Islands. The famous Kirkjubøstólarnir, which are parts of the original benches from Ólavskirkjan (St. Olav's Church) at Kirkjubøur are amongst the most valued cultural items of the National Museum. These were in Denmark for many years but have now returned to the Faroe Islands.

== Heima á Garði in Hoyvík ==
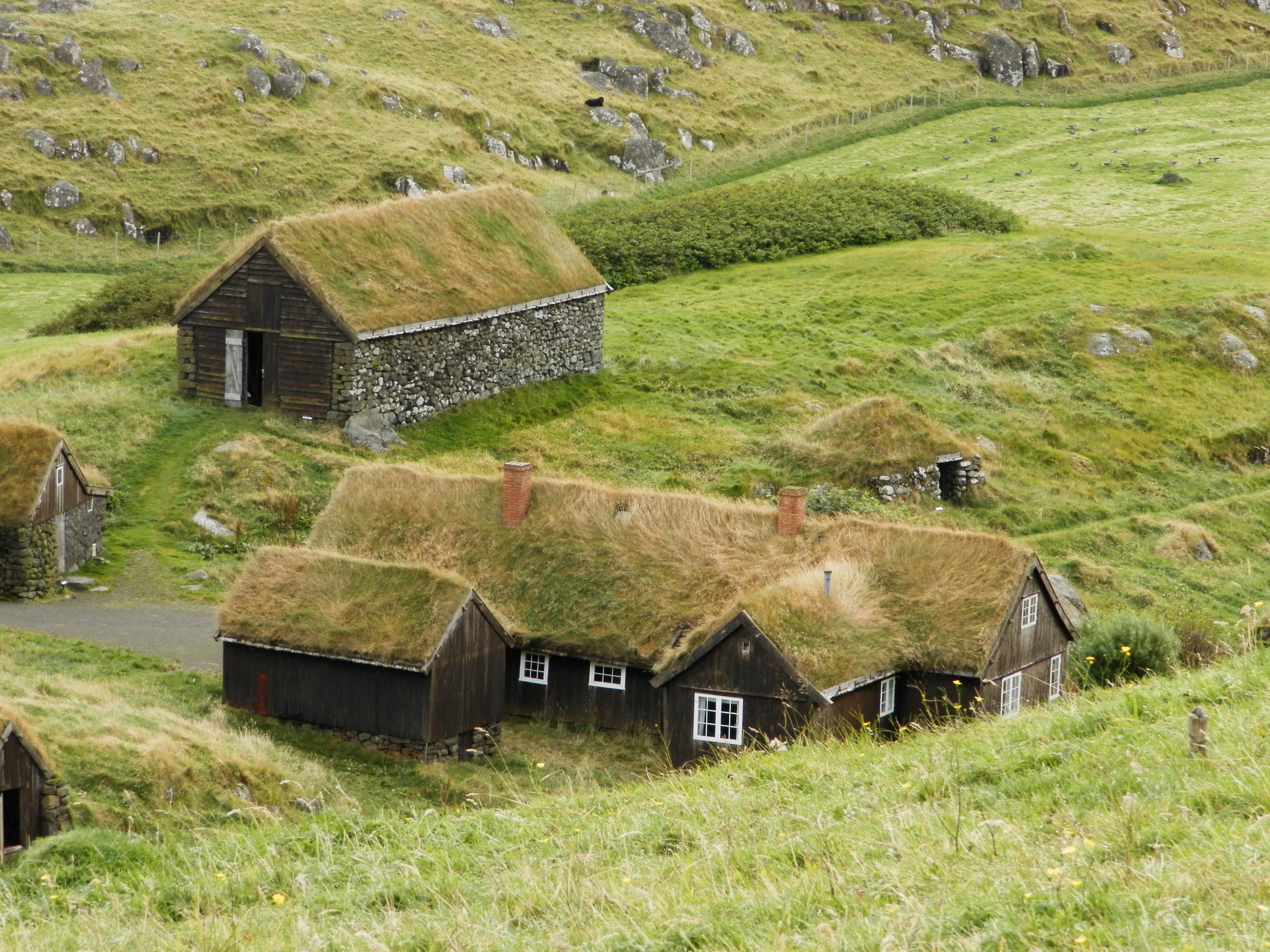
Hoyvíksgarður

Heima á Garði is a farmhouse in Hoyvík, near Tórshavn. The farmhouse is now a part of the National Museum of the Faroe Islands. The main building was built around 1812, but it is furnished like Faroese houses were in 1920s. The museum is an outdoors museum with all the buildings, tools, and other items which belonged to the farmhouse.

== Pew ends ==
The medieval pew ends from Saint Olav's church at Kirkjubøur (mentioned above) featured in three series of Faroese stamps, engraved by Czeslaw Slania.

Faroese stamps 1980:

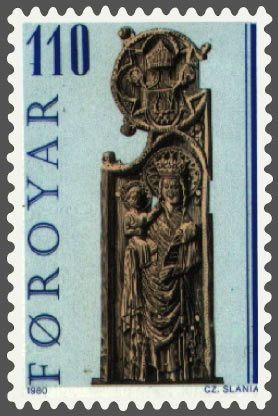
FR 49: Maria and Baby Jesus

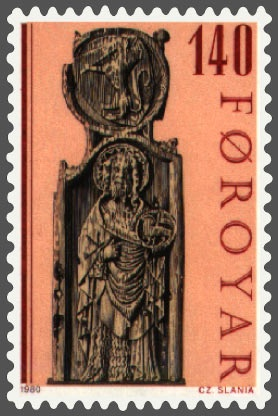
FR 50: St. John the Baptist

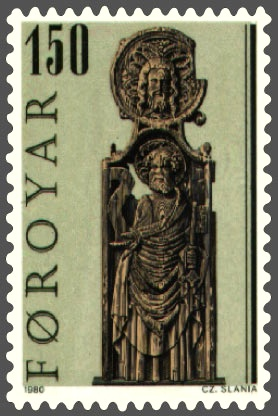
FR 51: St. Peter

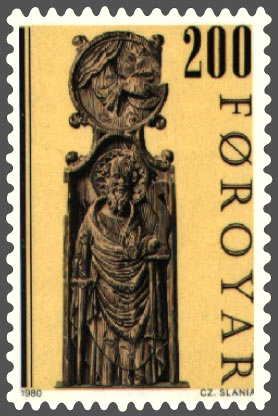
FR 52: St. Paul

Faroese stamps 1984:

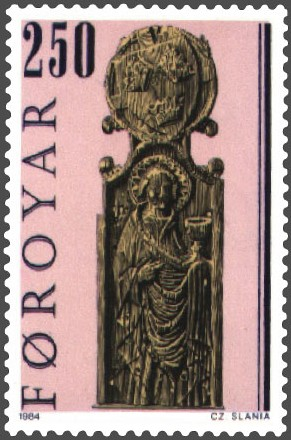
FR 087: Saint John, the Evangelist.

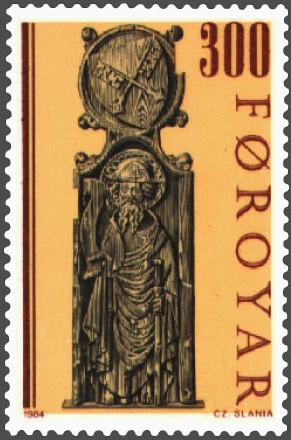
FR 088: Saint James.

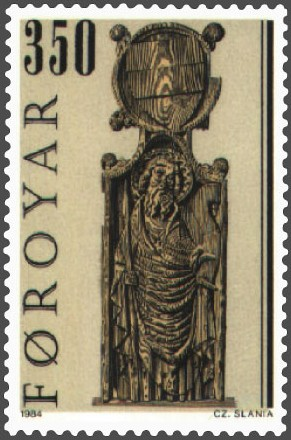
FR 089: Saint Thomas.

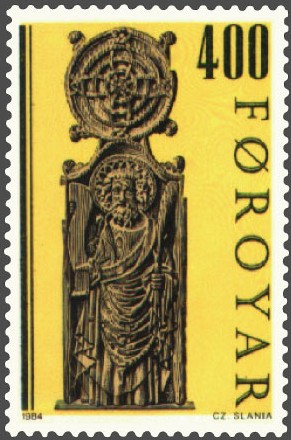
FR 090: Saint Judas Thaddeus.

Faroese stamps 2001:

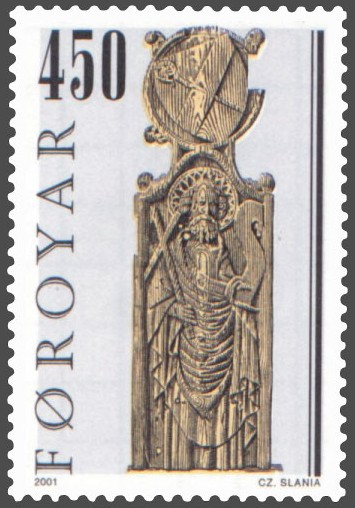
FR 379: Saint Andrew.

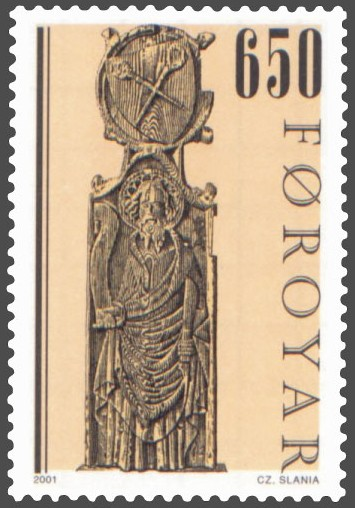
FR 380: Saint Bartholomew.

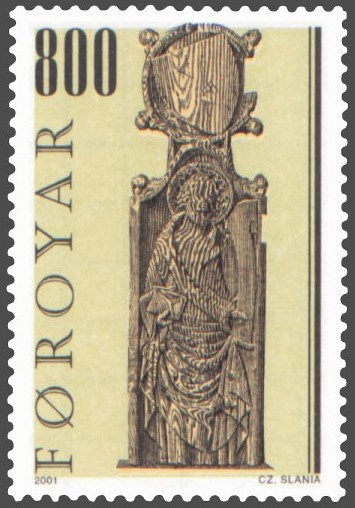
FR 381: Unidentified apostle.

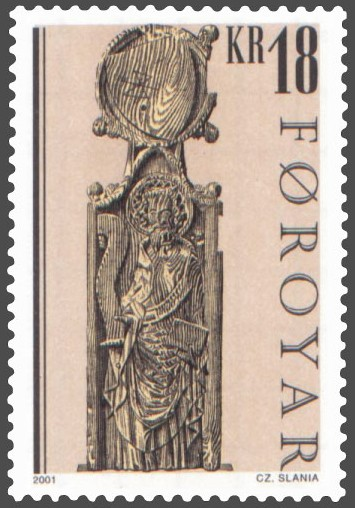
FR 382: Unidentified apostle.

== See also ==
- List of national museums
- National Archives of the Faroe Islands
- National Library of the Faroe Islands
