= Jóannes Patursson =

Faroese nationalist leader and poet

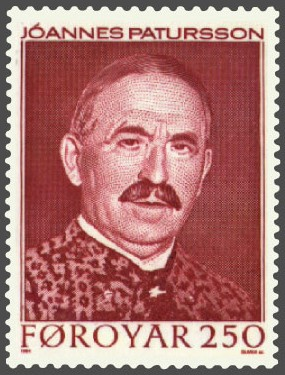
Jóannes Patursson featured on Faroe Islands postal stamp (1984)

Jóannes Patursson (May 6, 1866 – August 2, 1946) was a Faroese nationalist leader and poet. He served as a member of the Parliament of Denmark and the Parliament of the Faroe Islands.

== Background ==
Jóannes was born in 1866 as the eldest son of a wealthy farmer in Kirkjubøur. He was the great-grandson of the Faroese national hero Nólsoyar Páll (originally, Poul Poulsen Nolsøe). His brother Sverri Patursson was an important writer and his sister Susanna Helena Patursson the first feminist of the Faroe Islands.

The so-called King's Farm of Kirkjubøur dates back to the 11th century, was the seat of the Faroese bishop until the 1536 Reformation and became — and still remains today — the greatest Royal Danish fief of the Faroese when King Christian III of Denmark confiscated the clerical properties. On the traditional farmstead he grew up in an environment where Faroese folklore was especially cultivated. Here people had gathered for centuries for the daily Kvøldseta, the evening get-together, where old tales would be told, Faroese ballads would be sung and the Faroese dance was popular. All this happened at a time when the Faroese language was only just being committed to writing due to this oral tradition.

== National movement ==
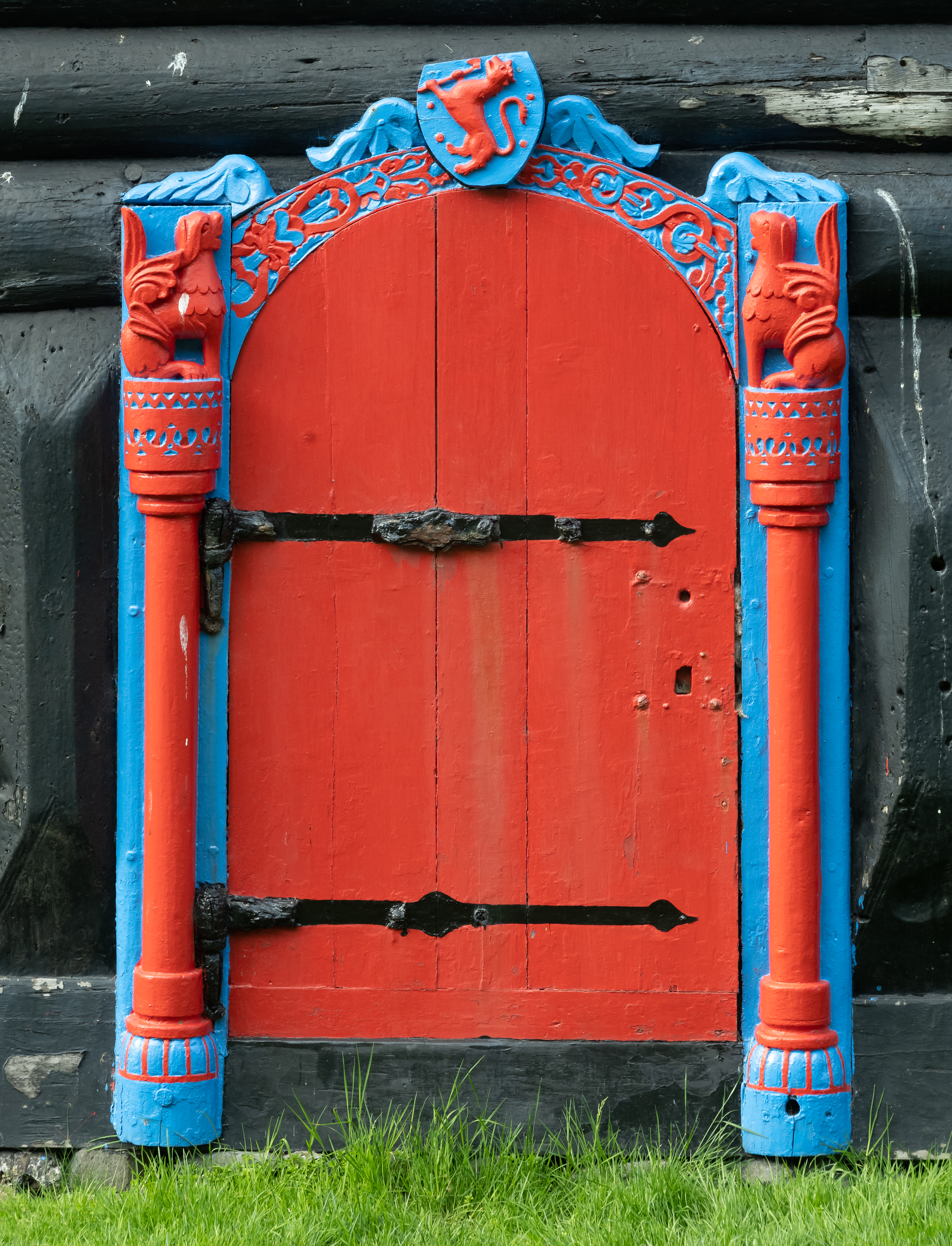
The Viking Age carved door of the roykstovan at Kirkjubøur was destroyed in 1833. This accurate copy was built and carved by the "King's Farmer" Jóannes Patursson in 1907. On the top is something that looks like the Norwegian Lion; the Faroes were formerly a Norwegian colony.

Jóannes was sent to Norway for an apprenticeship in farming.

At home in Tórshavn, the Faroese capital near the Patursson farm, Danish was at the time the overwhelmingly dominant language. Still it was a time of national awakening. Already in 1856 the Danish trading monopoly had been lifted from the Faroe Islands and the islanders were experiencing a fast development from a medieval agricultural society to a modern nation of fishermen.

In 1888, the Faroese national movement was "officially" created at the Christmas Meeting, Jóannes Patursson being one of the main actors. Especially for this occasion he wrote a battle hymn, Nú er tann stundin komin til handa (Now is the hour come for acting). Allegedly, the 22-year-old Patursson was too timid to present his hymn at the meeting, so his older compatriot Rasmus Effersøe was selected.

Although Nú er tann stundin komin til handa does not reach the quality of Patursson's later poetry, it became a symbol of the struggle of the Faroese language and culture which, for example, was later to be Janus Djurhuus' "linguistic baptism".

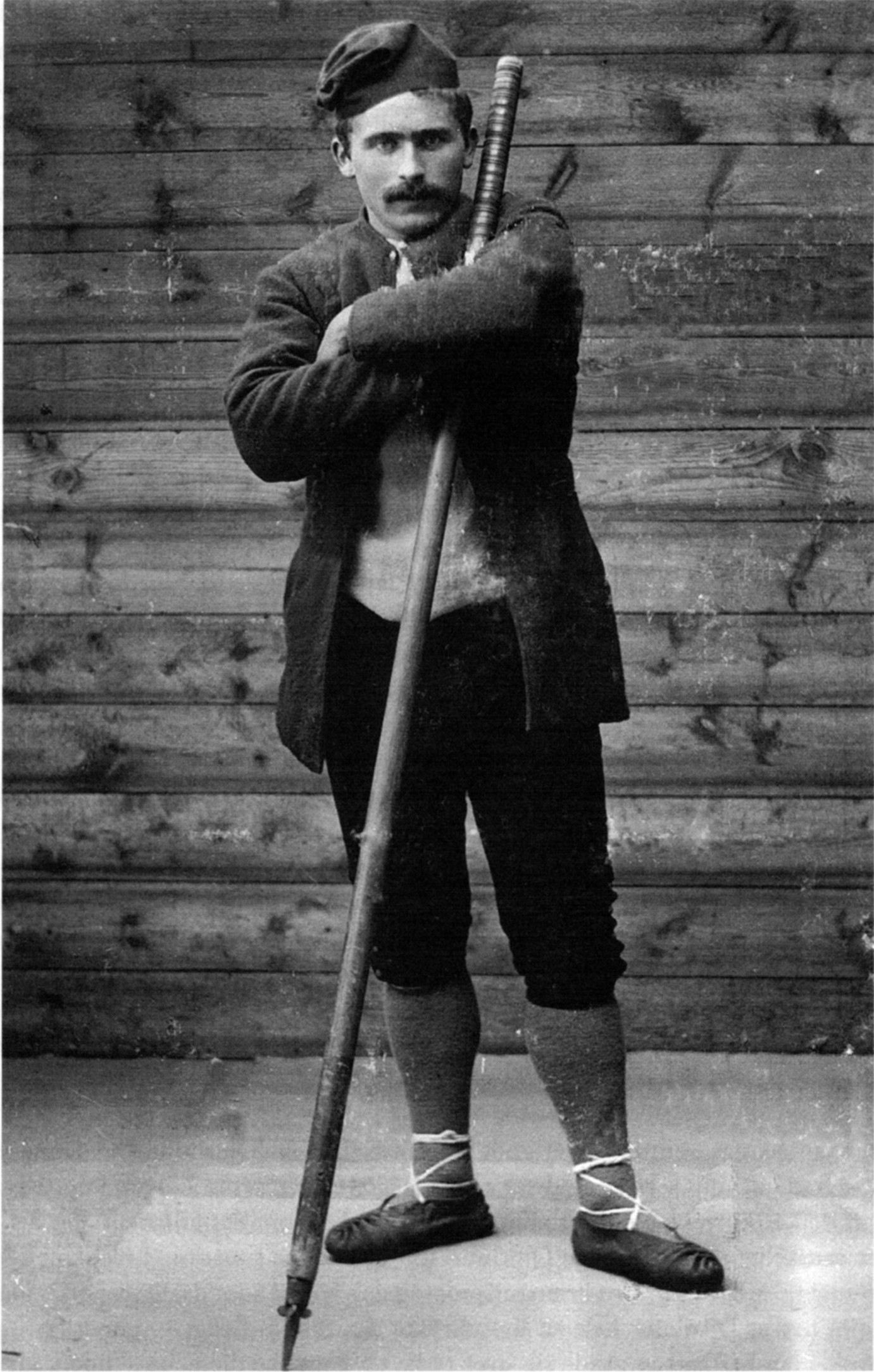
Jóannes Patursson

== Political career ==
In 1901, at the age of 35, Patursson was elected to the Løgting (Faroese parliament) for the first time, he was a member of the Løgting from 1901 til 1946. He was member of the Parliament of Denmark 1901–06, as one of two Faroese members, representing the Faroe Islands, and again in the periods 1918-1920 and 1928–1936, this time in the Landsting (there were two chambers before 1935).

In 1903 he published his book Færøsk politik (Faroese politics) in which he formulates five guidelines:

1. The Løgting is elected by the entire people and is led by a chairman and his substitute.
2. The Ombudsman of the Realm participates in the sessions but he himself has no voting right.
3. No law of the Faroe Islands becomes effective without approval by the Løgting.
4. The Løgting may suggest laws which can be directly approved by the chairman.
5. Under the supervision of the chairman, the Løgting gains control of Faroese finances.

At the time, such demands were revolutionary, while today they are the basis of Faroese politics.

In 1909, Patursson founded the Independence Party, Sjálvstýrisflokkurin.

In 1939 he was again co-founder of a party, the People's Party, Fólkaflokkurin, becoming their vice-chairman.

== Bibliography ==
- Færøsk politik. Nogle uddrag og betragtninger (1903).
- Kvæðabók, 5 vol (1922–1945).
- Føroysk kvæði : Um brøgd norðmanna ættarinnar úti og heima (1925).
- Færøsk selvstyre. Færingerne, et nordisk mindretal et norønt folk. (1931).
- Yrkingar, poems (1932).
- Við ókunnugum fólki til Kirkjubøar (1933).
- Heilsan í forðum og nú (1936).
- Tættir úr Kirkjubøar søgu, endurminningar (1966).
