= Magnus Cathedral =

Ruined cathedral on the island of Streymoy in the Faroe Islands

Coordinates: 61°57′21″N 6°47′36″W

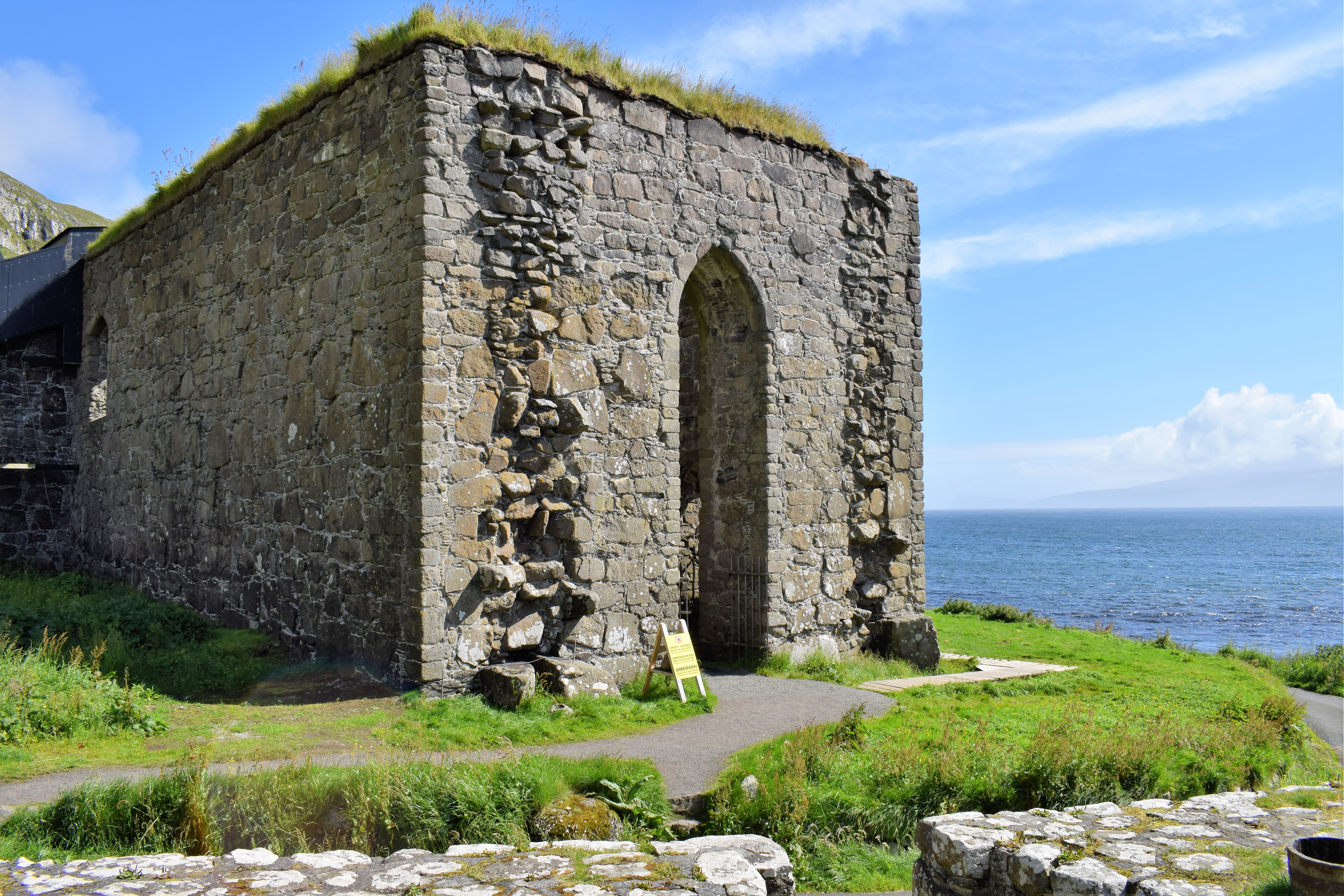
Ruins of Magnus Cathedral in 2017

Magnus Cathedral (Faroese: Kirkjubømúrurin, Magnus-katedralurin, Danish: Magnuskatedralen) is a ruined cathedral in the village of Kirkjubøur on the island of Streymoy in the Faroe Islands. The ruins are the largest medieval building in the Faroe Islands.

Ruins of Magnus Cathedral in 2026

Ruins of Magnus Cathedral in 2026

Interior of Magnus Cathedral in 2026

Interior of Magnus Cathedral in 2026

Arched window of Magnus Cathedral in 2026

== History ==
Interior relief carving of the crucifixion at Magnus Cathedral

Bishop Erlendur (1269–1308) started construction in about the year 1300. Earlier it was believed that the structure was never completed, however recent research suggests otherwise. The finding of an arch roof base and of old plastering on the walls indicate that the structure was actually roofed and in use at some point. Also the size of the famous pew ends from the nearby Saint Olav's Church indicates that they were originally made for and placed inside the roofed cathedral. However it did not have a long lifetime, because after the Reformation in 1537, the Diocese of the Faroe Islands was abolished and supposedly the cathedral was left to decay. In 1538, Jens Gregersøn Riber was appointed as the first Lutheran bishop to the Faroe Islands.

The only known relic of Saint Thorlak, the patron saint of Iceland, is a bone fragment contained with other saints' relics in a lead box in the sanctuary's end wall ("The Golden Locker"). An inscription indicates that a relic of Saint Magnus Erlendsson, Earl of Orkney was also held at the church.

== Conservation work ==
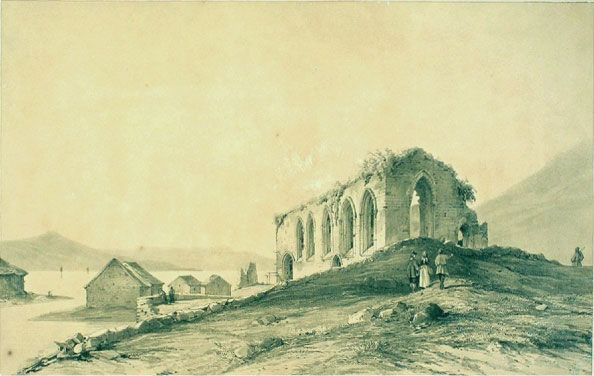
Magnus Cathedral Barthélemy Lauvergne (1805–1871)

Conservation work on the Cathedral started in 1997, as it became clear that the ruin was deteriorating at a rapid pace, with more and more mortar falling away due to the elements, mostly from rain, but also salty sea air and sea water. During 2002-2004, a wooden shed was erected around most of the ruin, giving it enough shelter to dry out, before work could begin on preservation. The shed drew considerable criticism because of its looks.

During the research into how to preserve the ruin, a conclusion was reached. No outward reconstruction would be made, and instead ongoing preservation work would be implemented, where the mortar would be reinforced from time to time. In addition, all horizontal surfaces, where water could seep in, would be "soft capped" with mortar and clay before being topped with sod and grass. This work began in 2010.

Today considerable headway has been made. Large sections of the shedding have been removed and work is expected to be finished in the not too distant future. While it is hoped that Magnus Cathedral will be accepted as a UNESCO World Heritage Site, the prospect is not very certain.

The site of the Cathedral before conservation works in 1988 with St Olaf's Church painted white to the left

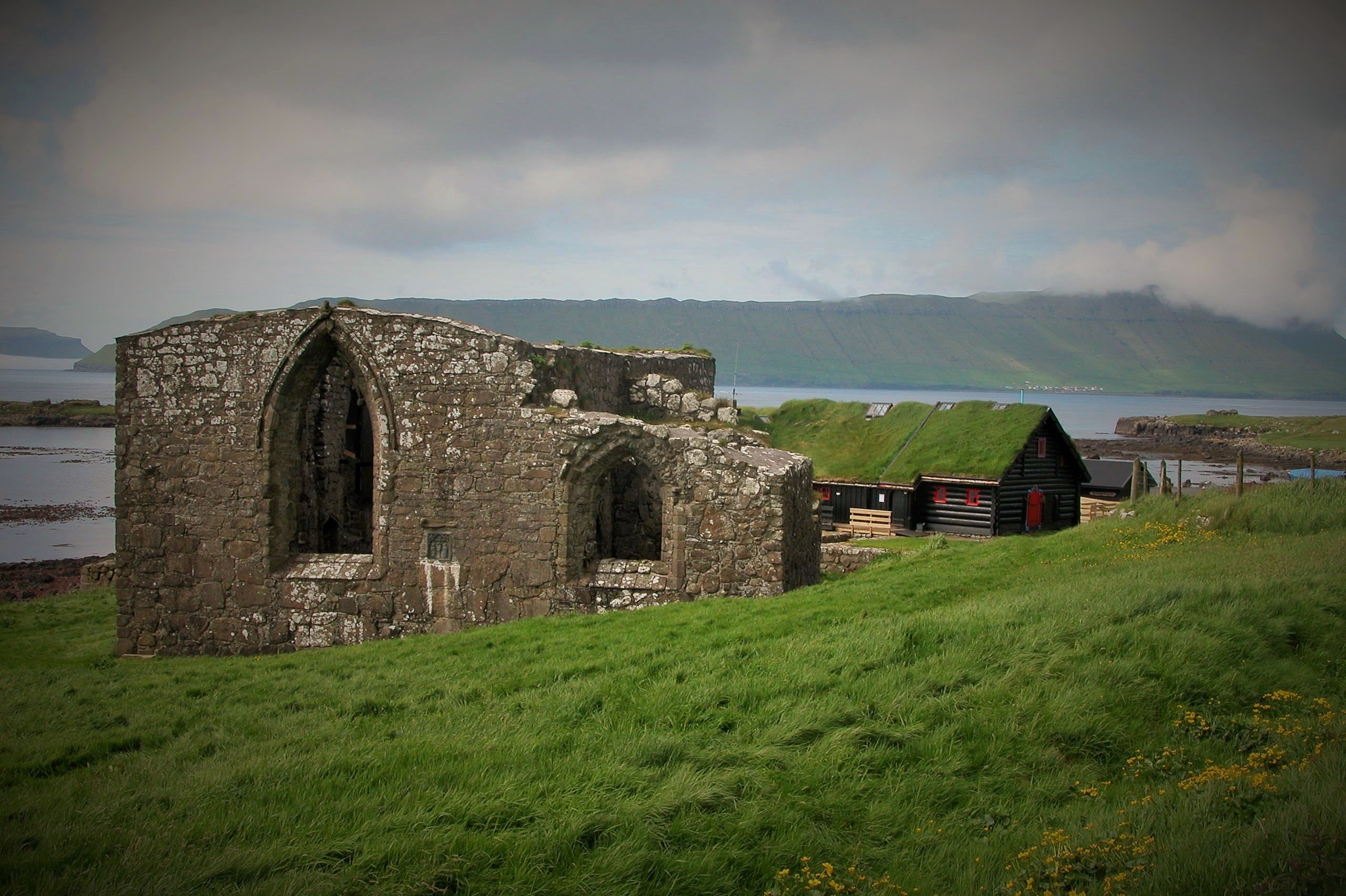
Ruins of Magnus Cathedral in 2004 at the start of advanced conservation work

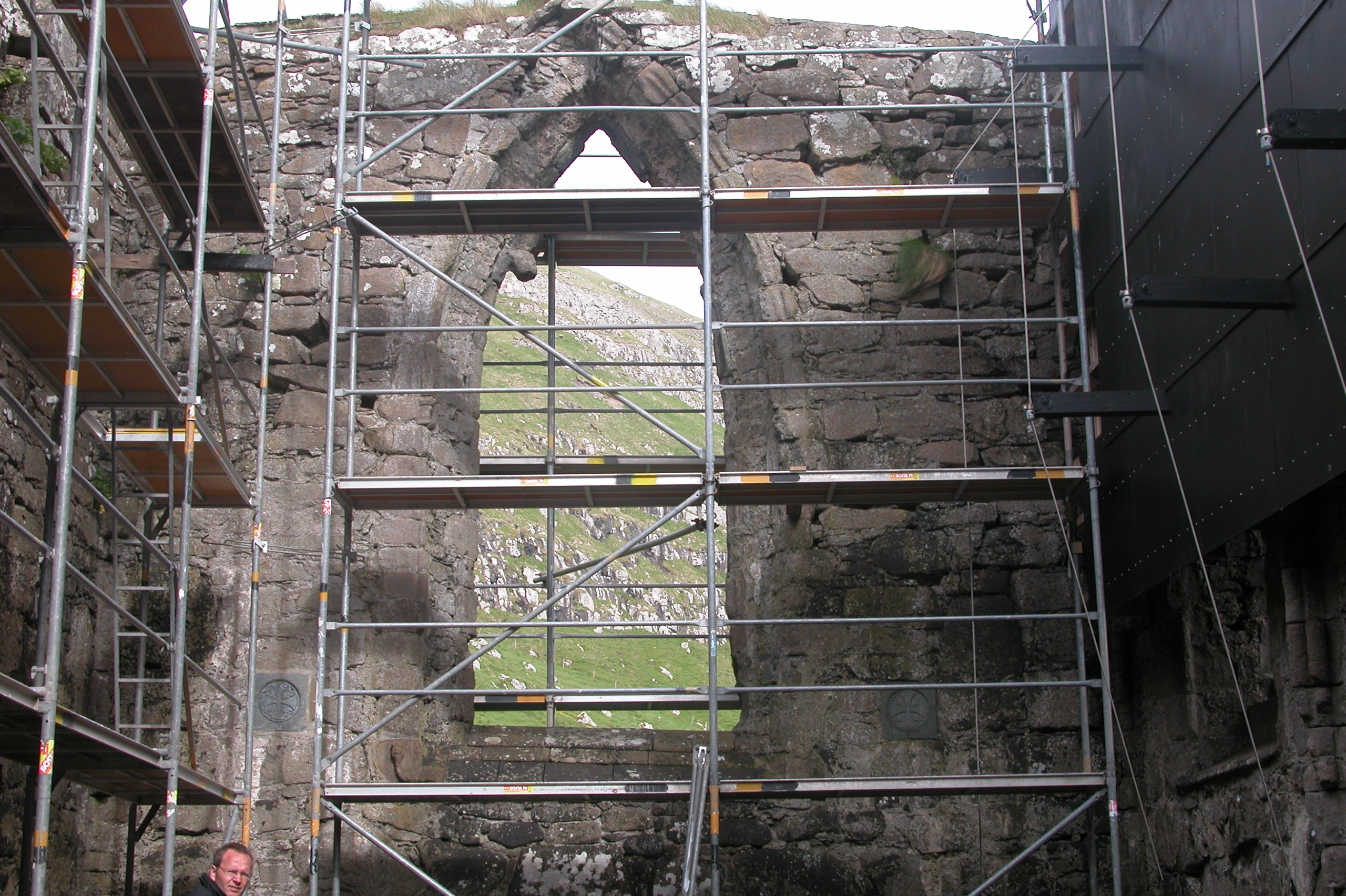
Interior of Magnus Cathedral in 2004 at the start of advanced conservation work

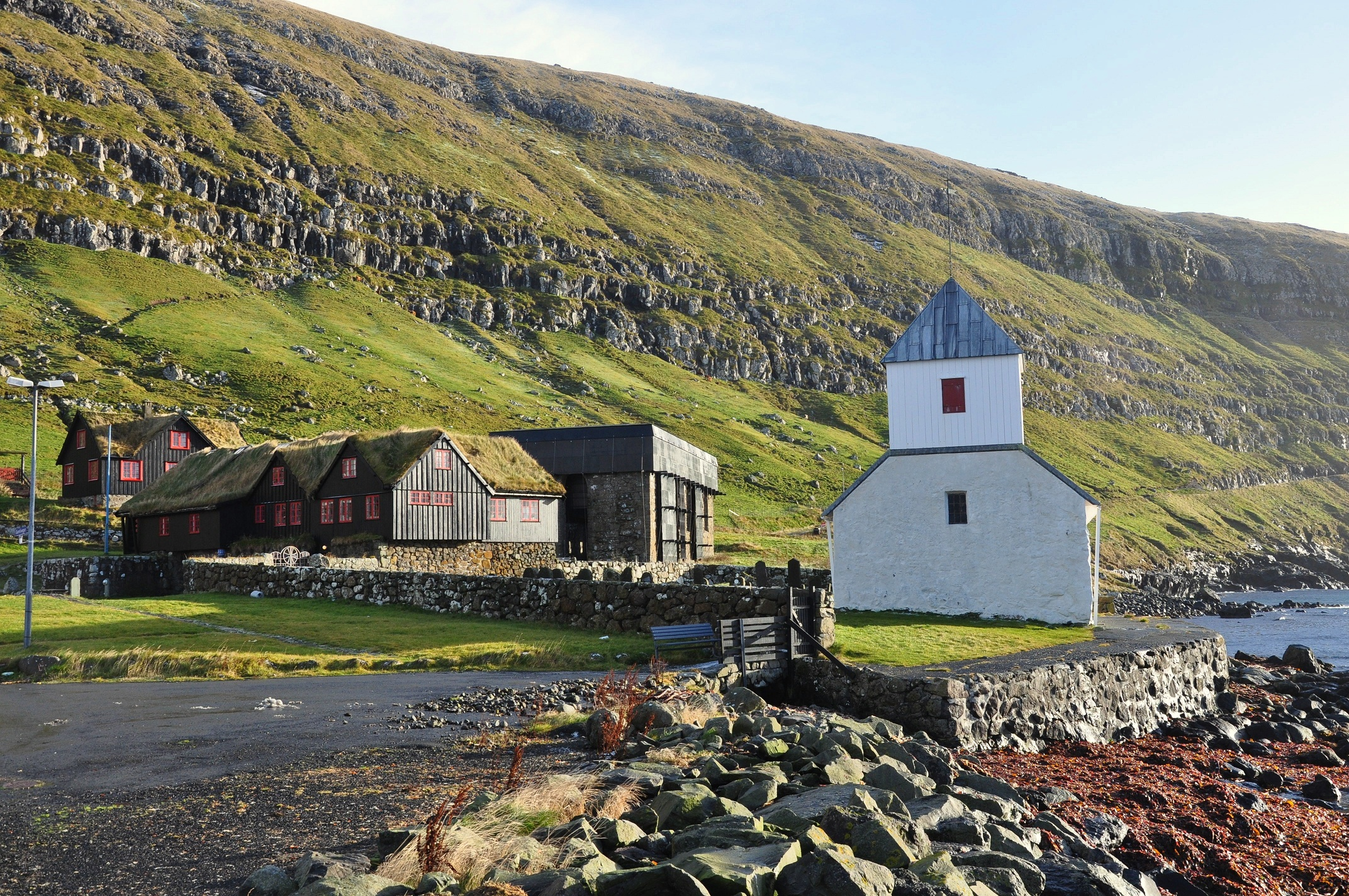
The site of the Cathedral during conservation works in 2010 with St Olaf's Church painted white to the right

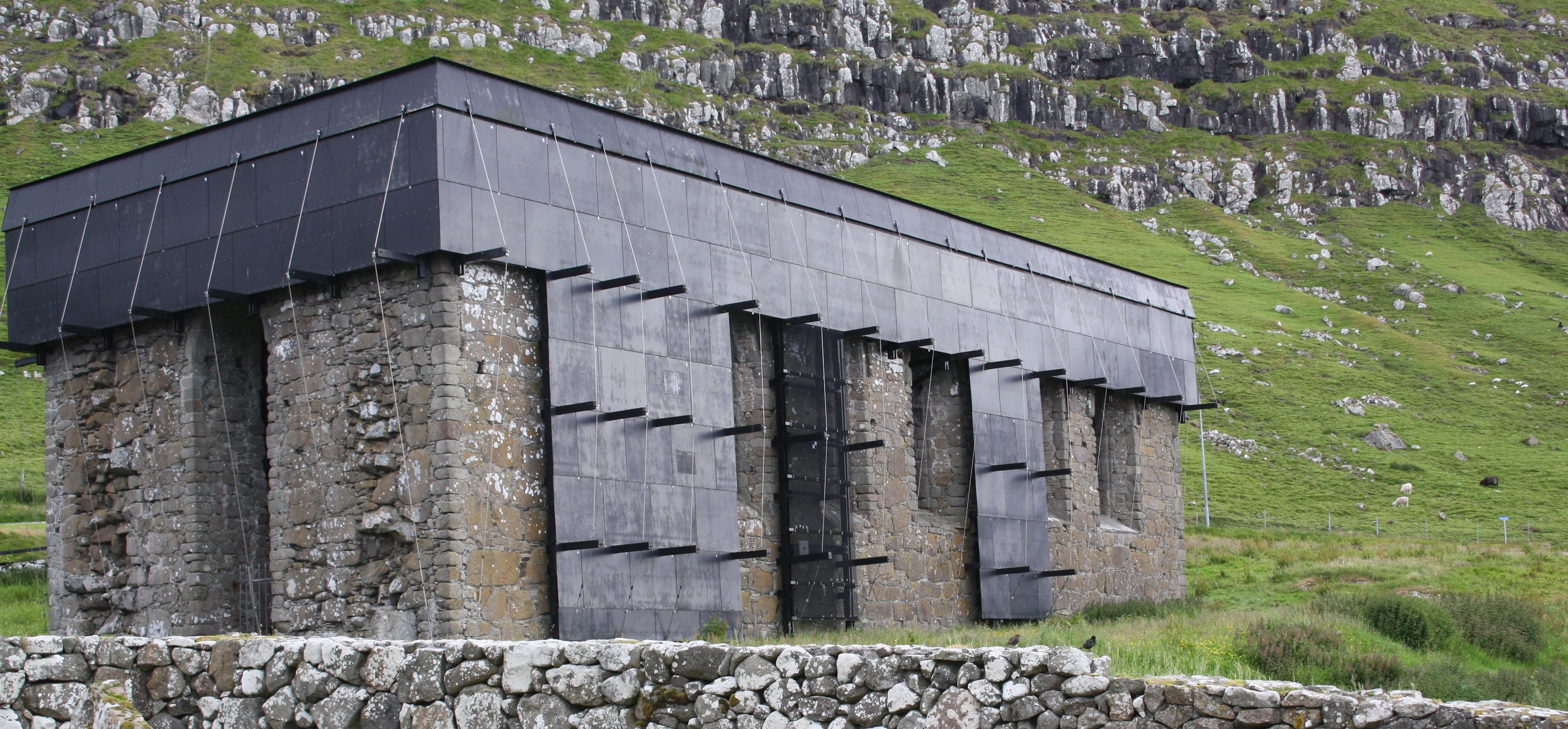
Magnus Cathedral during conservation works in 2012

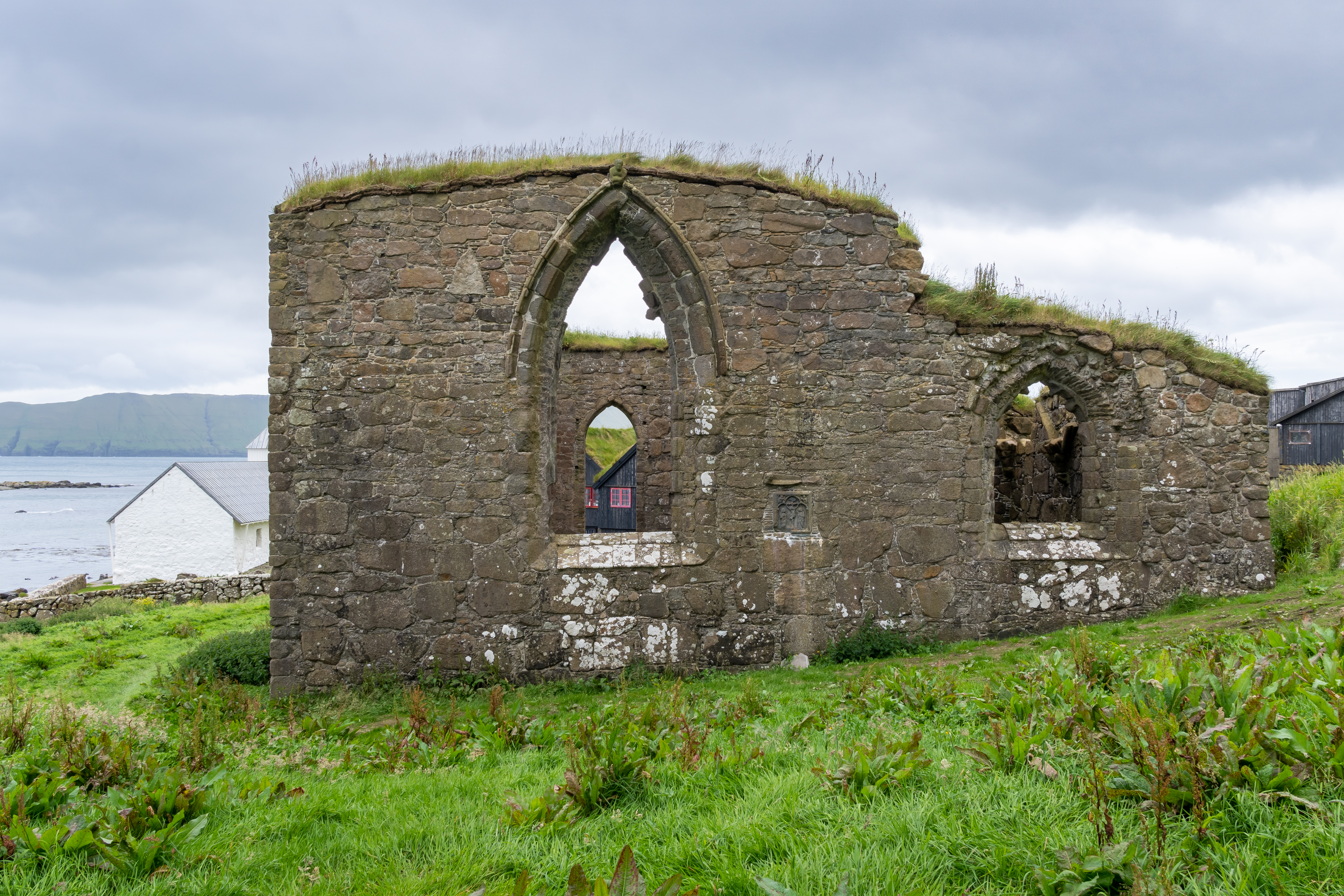
Magnus Cathedral after conservation work in 2022

== Cultural impact ==
Pictures of the ruins of Magnus Cathedral were featured on a series of Faroese stamps in 1988:

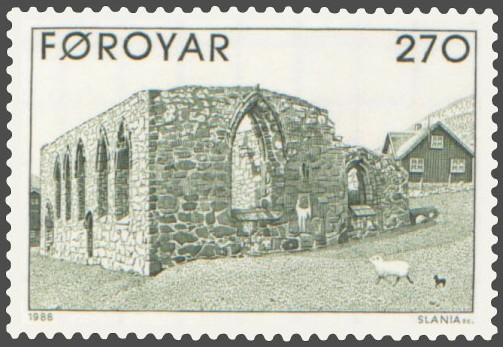
FR 169: The Cathedral. Note the detail of ewe and lamb in the foreground

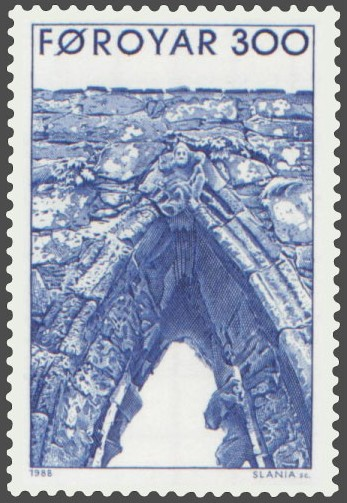
FR 170: Detail of a gothic arch

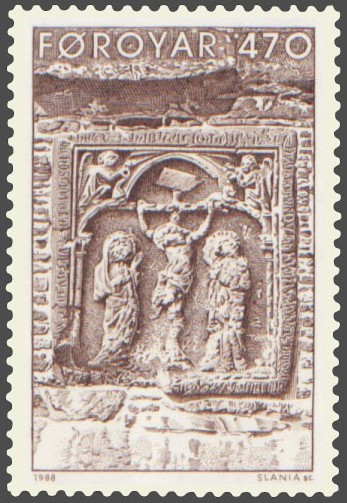
FR 171: The crucifixion on an indoor wall

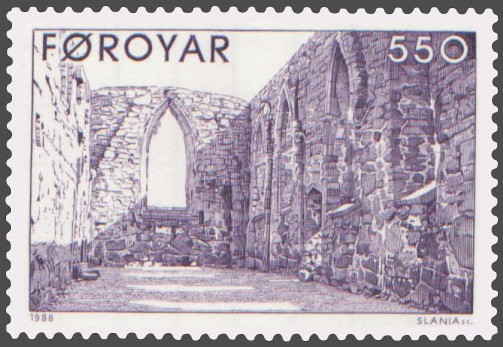
FR 172: Inside the ruins

== Related reading ==
- Hans Jacob Debes (1990) Føroya søga, Volum 2 (Tórshavn: Føroya Skúlabókagrunnar) ISBN 9789991800608
- The Cathedral of Kirkjubøur and the Medieval Bishop’s See of the Faroes ("Múrurin og miðaldar bispasætið í Kirkjubø"). Kirstin S. Eliasen and Morten Stige (ed.). Tórshavn 2024. ISBN 978-99918-3-789-5
