= National Archives of the Faroe Islands =

Government archive

The National Archives of the Faroe Islands (Faroese: Tjóðskjalasavnið) are located in Tórshavn; they were established there in 1932 as a government archive. It is now the largest collection of documents in the country and has acquired educational and research functions.

In 1932, the Danish government responded to the request of Faroese politicians and administrators to stop archiving documents in Denmark rather than in the Faroes. Government and military documents were however exempted.

The archive was moved in 1972 to rooms in the Natural History Museum, including a reading room. In the 1980s they were transferred to a purpose-built building at V.U. Hammershaimbsgøta 24, near the university and the original location, V.U. Hammershaimbsgøta 11.

In 2011, as a cost-saving measure, the National Archives was administratively combined with the National Library of the Faroe Islands, the National Museum of the Faroe Islands, the Natural History Museum, and the Kaldbak Marine Biological Laboratory (Faroese: Havlívfrøðiliga Royndarstøðin) to form Faroese National Heritage (Faroese: Søvn Landsins). In 2017 Faroese National Heritage (Faroese: Søvn Landsins) was dissolved and the National Archives of the Faroe Islands became an independent institution directly under the Ministry of Culture.

For many years only Klaksvík had its own archive but since October 2017 the Faroese Government has been funding a local archives in Tvøroyri.

The archives amount to 4.5 kilometres (2.8 mi) of shelved materials in two locations. Digitisation is a high priority; online access is also available to visitors to the National Archives, and in 2007 a project began to create an electronic database of genealogical data on the inhabitants of the islands, drawing on records from the past 200 years.

The National Archives has a director, Sámal Tróndur Finnsson Johansen, and eight other employees, whose responsibilities include training civil servants in archiving and assisting with research.

== See also ==
- List of national archives
