= Sverri Patursson =

Faroese writer, author and journalist

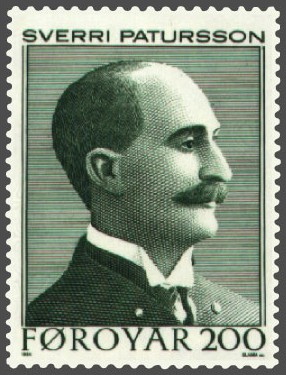
Sverri Patursson featured on a Faroese postage stamp (1984)

Sverri Patursson (1871–1960) was a Faroese writer, author, and journalist. He was also a translator, ornithologist and environmentalist.

== Biography ==
Patursson was born in the village of Kirkjubøur on Streymoy, Faroe Islands. He attended Vallekilde Folk High School in Zealand in Denmark. Patursson worked as a journalist and his articles frequently featured Faroese wildlife with birds a principal focus. He was devoted to make the Faroe Islands known, and his actions included writing tourist articles as a freelance journalist for the Scandinavian press. Patursson was also a translator and literary writer, and an early author who wrote in Faroese. Patursson was the brother of Súsanna Helena Patursson, a famous Faroese actress and writer in her own right, and Jóannes Patursson, who led the Faroese nationalist movement.

== Bibliography ==
=== Own work ===
- Dagdvølja, 1901
- Nøkur orð um hin føroyska dansin, 1908
- Fra Færøernes næringsveie i tekst og billeder, Kria. 1918
- Móti loysing (political articles), 1925
- Landaskipan og figgjarlig viðurskiftur i fristatinum Føroyar (political articles), 1928
- Fuglar og folk (noveller og essays), 1935 (2nd edition 1968)
- Fuglar og fólk. Kirkjubøur: Øssur Patursson, 1968 (176 pages)
- Fram við Sugguni : søgur, greinir, røður og yrkingar. (short stories, articles, speeches and poems, published after his death). Tórshavn: Emil Thomsen, 1971 (172 pages)
- Fuglaframi: 1898-1902. Tórshavn: Offset-prent, Emil Thomsen, 1972 (408 pages)
- Fra Færøernes næringsveie i tekst og billeder : med historisk oversigt. Tórshavn: Sjóvinnubankin, 1982 (76 pages)
- Ábal og aðrar søgur Tórshavn: Føroya skúlabókagrunnur, (Ábal and other short stories) 2nd edition 2004 (45 pages, school book)

=== Translations ===
- Robinson Kruso - Daniel Defoe (translated into Faroese by Sverre Patursson), 1914 (2nd edition 1968)
