= Helena Patursson =

Faroese actress and writer

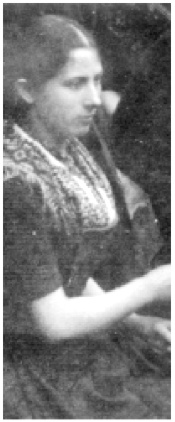
- Helena Patursson as young lady in 1889 at the premiere of her play Veðurføst.
- Born: August 27, 1864; Kirkjubøur, Faroe Islands
- Died: December 15, 1916 (aged 52); Kirkjubøur

Súsanna Helena Patursson (27 August 1864 in Kirkjubøur – 15 December 1916 in Kirkjubøur) was a Faroese actress and writer, and the first political feminist in the country, particularly stressing the need for all Faroe Islanders to be able to write and learn Faroese. She also wrote the first play in the Faroese language. Her brothers, Sverri Patursson and Jóannes Patursson, were well-known figures in the Faroese national movement.

== Biography ==
Helena Patursson was born on 27 August 1864 to Poul Peder Pedersen, a wealthy farmer, and Ellen Cathrine Djonesen. She grew up on Kirkjubøargarður, Kirkjubøur, where she received private lessons with her brothers, Sverri and Jóannes. Later, she went to Copenhagen, where she learned piano and needlework. She worked there as a paralegal until 1904 when she returned to the Faroes.

Like her brothers, who were leading figures of the Faroese nationalist revival, Helena Paturson had been an activist since the Christmas Meeting of 1888, where the movement was founded. Her activism was mainly addressed to women. In 1889, she wrote the first play in Faroese, Veðurføst (feminine form of veðurfastur - unable to move from a place because of weather conditions, "weather-stuck"). The play was about women's role in the national awakening and teaching Faroese (which at the time had no official status as a language) at home. Only fragments of the play's manuscript are still preserved.

Patursson also wrote in the newspapers Føringatíðindi (Faroe Periodical) and Fuglaframi (Fowl Forth - the Faroese people's furtherance), which belonged to her brothers, Jóannes and Sverre. In Copenhagen, she organised a women's union, and in 1896 she persuaded the Faroese Association there to affiliate with women.

In 1904, Patursson returned to the Faroe Islands, and in 1905, she founded and began writing her own periodical, Oyggjarnar (the Islands). Oyggjarnar was the only periodical in the Faroese language at the time, and it was also the first periodical primarily aimed at Faroese women. Issues were four pages long and released weekly. It initially sold for 1,5 crowns for a half-year subscription, but later the cost lessened.

Oyggjarnar was not addressed solely to women. Most articles were about Faroese education, the need for the shift from being taught entirely in Danish to teaching children in Faroese (at the time, Danish was the official language and was the language used in schools), the international perception of the Faroe Islands, the Faroese women's roles or jobs, recipes (which were considered a national request at the time), and tips on how to create a good home. For instance, Oyggjarnar emphasised that girls should have the same food as boys, and articles might be written about news from Iceland or Norway as told by a Faroer who visited there. The periodical advocated for a new women's role, one that retained some aspects of the traditional farmer's culture while emphasizing the necessity of home beautification. For example, traditional wool processing becoming only something for handicrafts.

A book, partially a compilation of her articles from Oyggjarnar, came out in February 1908 and was called Matreglur fyri hvørt hús (literally, "Food-rules for every house"). It was the first Faroese cookbook, and consisted of 160 "rules" (meaning recipes - at the time, there seemed to be no precise word for food "recipes” as the periodical itself switched between names for them often). It was sold for 50 oyra (half a crown, equivalent to cents of a dollar), and was for sale at the bookshop in Tórshavn, at B.A. Sálmalsson in Tórshavn, at various places in towns, and with Helena Patursson herself in Kirkjubøur.

Of the recipes published in the periodical at the time of the cookbook's release, most were for meals considered to be basic, traditional food today: oatmeal porridge, lamb, meatballs, liver paste, puffin, fishballs, plukkfisk (a common dish in Iceland and the Faroes, essentially leftover fish with potatoes and other things mixed in), kleynir (common in Iceland and the Faroes, a sort of plain, doughnut-like pastry eaten with coffee), cauliflower soup, and sausage. There were, however, a few recipes for more uncommon things, such as adaptations from so-called American recipes or instructions for how to cook pork, which by the article's admission, was something that almost no Faroers had tasted at the time. This was likely since the periodical was also being read by fishermen who spent most of their time traveling abroad to America, Denmark, and other countries with alternative foods. Some articles in the periodical were directly addressed to such fishermen.

== Oyggjarnar ==
Excerpt from Oyggjarnar (May 18, 1905):

Original	Free translation
Biligur og góður fiskabollar til húsbrúk	Inexpensive and tasty fishballs for the household
Hakka fiskin væl og leingi við tálg og salt, rør han so við nýmjølk í 20–25 minuttir, koyr mjølkina í so við og við, til »farcen« [färsen, the mince(meat)] er fult so tjúk sum jólakøkudeiggj. Set bollarnar út á kókandi løg, við silvurskeið ella tinskeið. Skeiðin má dryppast í løgin millum hvørja ferð, at bollarnir kunnu bliva snøggur og rundur.	Chop the fish well and for a long time with fat and salt, then mix it with fresh milk (whole milk) for 20–25 minutes. Add the milk in little by little so "the mincemeat" is as thick as Christmas cookie dough. Place the balls into a boiling solution with a silver or tin spoon. The spoon may be dipped into the solution in-between every trip so that the balls can become nice-looking and round.
»Sauce« til bollarnar: Set smør, væl av hakkaðum leyki, salt, stoytt muskat og eitt sindur av mjøli út á; tynn tað upp við fiskasoð til »saucen« er sum tunn avsia havrasuppa, og koyr nakað lítið av súrum og søtum í. Stoyt hana so yvir bollarnar og set eplur, hveitubreyð eða bæði sløgini afturat.	"Sauce" for the balls: Put out butter, with plenty of chopped onion, salt, crushed muscat, and a tiny bit of flour, and thin it up with fish broth (the leftover water from boiling fish) so "the sauce" is like thin [avsia - sieved?] oat-soup, and put a little of something sour and sweet in. Then sprinkle it over the balls and have potatoes, wheat bread, or both things as a side dish.
Fínari »sauce« til fiskabollar verður gjørd umtrent uppá sama hátt, men uttan leyk, og tá letur man: kapers, citrónsaft og hvítt vín út á, og javnar »saucen« við 1—2 eggjablommun.	A finer "sauce" for fishballs would be made in about the same way, but without onion, and then one fetches: capers, lemon juice, and white wine and thickens "the sauce" with 1-2 egg yolks.

Patursson's second book, Fríðka um búgvið (beautification around dwellings/the home), was published in 1912. In 1908, Oyggjarnar was discontinued due to a decrease in support from her famous brothers.

Malan Marnersdóttir, a Faroese professor of literature and Patursson's biographer, supposes that it was a sign of the times that a single woman's voice was missed in that time when men dominated the political scene of the national movement. However, Helena Patursson was a pioneer, and her work and ideas were continued in 1952 when Kvinnufelagið (The Women's Union/Group) was founded.
