= Tróndur Patursson =

Faroese painter, sculptor, glass artist and adventurer

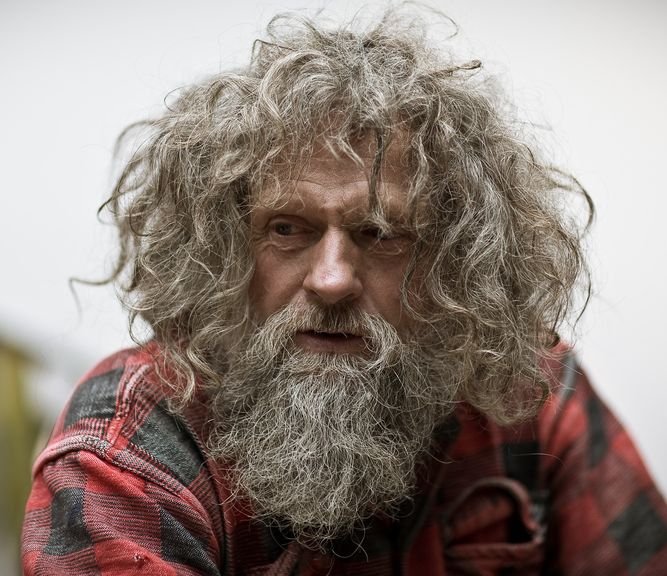
Tróndur Patursson

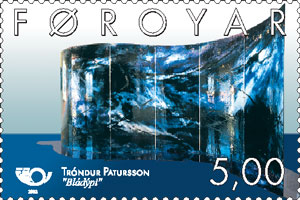
Glass art by Tróndur Patursson on a Faroese stamp

Tróndur Patursson (born 1 March 1944 in Kirkjubøur) is a Faroese painter, sculptor, glass artist and explorer. He was educated in Norway and was initially a sculptor. He has since become better known as a painter and glass artist.

In February 2013 Patursson had an art exhibition at the John F. Kennedy Center for the Performing Arts; it was an installation called "Migration", featuring approximately 90 of his trademark stained glass birds in the Grand Foyer windows throughout Nordic Cool 2013. The exhibition was a part of the Nordic Cool 2013.

In 1976 he joined Tim Severin in a transatlantic voyage in a replica 6th century leather-hulled currach named Brendan. The boat was named for the Irish monk Saint Brendan who was said to have made the same voyage centuries before the Vikings and Christopher Columbus.

Patursson joined Brendan when it arrived in the Faroe Islands and replaced another crewman. Patursson's home was at Brandonvik, the Viking name for Brendan's Creek.

== Honour ==
- 2013 - Faroese Cultural Prize
