= Ancient Diocese of the Faroe Islands =

Former Roman Catholic Diocese of the Faroe Islands

Diocese of Faroe Islands Dioecesis Phereyensis Færøernes Stift
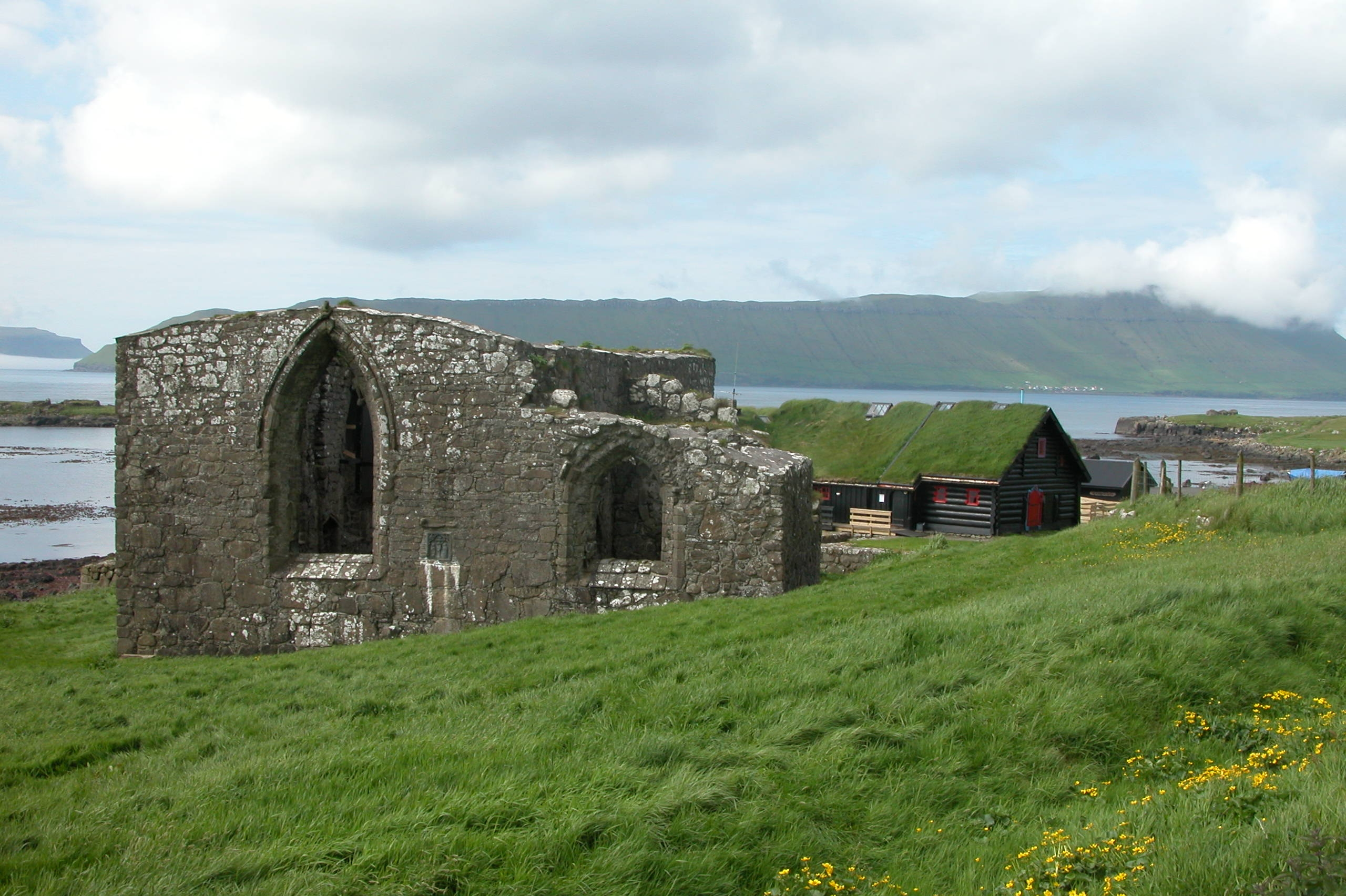
- Ruins of Magnus Cathedral, seat of the bishop of the Faroe Islands.

Location
- Country: Norway (now Denmark)

Information
- Denomination: Roman Catholic
- Sui iuris church: Latin Church
- Rite: Roman Rite
- Established: 1076
- Dissolved: 1538
- Cathedral: Magnus Cathedral

The former Roman Catholic Diocese of the Faroe Islands existed from the 11th century to the Protestant Reformation. The Faroe Islands are now included in the Roman Catholic Diocese of Copenhagen.

== History ==
As recorded in the Færeyinga saga, Sigmundur Brestisson came to the Faroes and converted the people to Christianity more or less one by one. He was eventually attacked at his home by his first (forced) convert, Tróndur í Gøtu, swam to another island to escape, and was finally killed by a farmer for his gold jewelry.

There is some confusion as to when the first bishop for the islands was consecrated, as Adam of Bremen notes that a self-proclaimed bishop of Helgoland was referred to in Latin as the bishop of "Farria."

The bishops of the Faroe Islands were usually chosen from the canons of the Diocese of Bergen and were originally suffragans of the Archdiocese of Hamburg-Bremen. The diocese was granted to Lund in 1104 and then Niðaros after 1152. The see was based at Kirkjubøur, which legend holds was given to Bishop Orm by Gæsa Sigursdottir as a penance for her having eaten meat during Lent.

Amund Olafson was the last Roman Catholic bishop of the islands and was forced to yield his see and title to the Lutheran superintendent, Jens Riber. Later, only "provosts" were elected. The Catholic clergy were unable to resist the advance of Lutheranism. By the end of 16th century, the Catholic faith had disappeared.

In the Catholic era, at least, no little attention paid to the construction and adornment of churches, as may be seen from the ruins of the unfinished Magnus Cathedral of Kirkjubøur. The thick basaltic walls broken by high, massive windows are evidence that the original builders meant to erect a Gothic church. It remained unfinished.

== List of the bishops of the Faroe Islands ==
1. 1047-1067—Bernhard Sakseren, missionary bishop
2. Late 11th century—Ryngerus, missionary bishop
3. c. 1100-1137—Gudmund
4. 1138-?—Orm, who acquired Kirkjubøur
5. ?-1157—Matthew I [or] Martin I
6. 1158-1162—[vacant]
7. 1162-1174—Roe, who taught Sverre Sigurdsson, king of Norway after 1184
8. ?-1212—Sven
9. 1213?-1214—Olaf
10. 1215—[vacant]
11. 1216-1237?—Serquirus [or] Sverker
12. ?-1243—Bergsven
13. c. 1245—Nicholas(?) [doubtful]
14. 1246-1257—Peter
15. 1258-1260/61—[vacant]
16. 1261/62-1268—Gaute
17. 1269-1308—Erlandr (Erland), who expanded church holdings throughout the islands
18. 1309-1312—[vacant]
19. 1313?-1316—Lodin of Borgund
20. 1317-1319—[vacant]
21. 1320-?—Signar
22. ?—Gevard
23. 1343-1348—Håvard
24. 1349?—[vacant]
25. 1350?-1359—Arne I
26. 1359-1369—Arne II Svæla
27. ?—Andrew [elected, but likely unconsecrated]
28. ?—Arnold(?) [doubtful]
29. 1381?—Richard
30. 1385-?—William Northbrigg
31. ?—Vigbold [or] Vigbald
32. 1391—Philip Gudbrandsson of Nidaros [elected, but likely unconsecrated]
33. 1392?—Halgier [likely unconsecrated]
34. 1408-1430?—Jon I the German
35. 1432-1434—Severinus, also bishop of Tranquilia
36. 1434?—Jon II the Dominican
37. 1434-?—Jon III the Chief
38. 1441/42?-1451?—Hemming
39. 1452?–1453?—[vacant]
40. 1453-?—Jon IV
41. ?—Matthew II [or] Martin II
42. ?—Hilary(?) [questionable]
43. ?-1532?—Chilianus
44. 1532?–1538?—Ámundur Ólavsson (Amund), last Catholic bishop, ordered by Christian III to leave his mistress and his office
45. 1540-1556—Jens Riber, Lutheran, last bishop

== See also ==
- Roman Catholicism in the Faroe Islands
- The Lutheran Church of the Faroe Islands
