= Símun Petur Zachariasen =

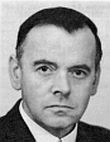
Símun Petur Zachariasen

Símun Petur Zachariasen (November 2, 1887 – October 15, 1977) was a Faroese teacher, editor, and politician for the Home Rule Party.

== Family ==
Zachariasen was born in Kirkja on the island of Fugloy, Faroe Islands. He was the son of Símun Mikkjal Zachariasen from Kirkja and Malena Frederikka Simonsen from Hattarvík, and was the brother of Louis Zachariasen. Símun Petur Zachariasen married Maria Henriksen from Klaksvík, and they were the parents of the politician Álvur Zachariasen.

== Career ==
Zachariasen graduated from the Faroese Teachers School in 1908 and worked as a teacher in Klaksvík from 1914 to 1953, and as the editor of the newspaper Norðlýsið from 1915 onward. He served as the head of the bank Norðoya Sparikassa from 1919 to 1976.

Zachariasen was mayor of the Municipality of Klaksvík from 1930 to 1934. He served as a representative of the Home Rule Party for the Norðoyar district in the Faroese Parliament from 1928 to 1943, and again from 1946 to 1956.

In 1972, he published a collection of his father's poetry in the volume Ein yrkjari á útoyggj (A Poet on an Outlying Island).
