= Símun Mikkjal Zachariasen =

Faroese teacher and social activist

Simon Michael Zachariasen (3 January 1853 – 16 December 1931), also known as Símun Mikkjal Zachariasen, was a Faroese teacher and social activist.

Zachariasen was born at Kirkja on the island of Fugloy. He was a driving force in the development of written Faroese, and he wrote patriotic poetry and hymns. He became familiar with Hammershaimb's grammar of the language, wrote many articles in the newspaper Føringatíðindi from 1890 onward, and participated in discussions about language and education in the newspapers.

Zachariasen married Malena Frederikka Simonsen from Hattarvík, and their sons were Símun Petur Zachariasen and Louis Zachariasen. Zachariasen initially worked as a seaman, but after a leg injury he studied at and graduated from the Faroese Teachers School in 1878. Zachariasen taught on Fugloy and Svínoy from 1878 to 1903, and taught at Kirkja on Fugloy from 1903 to 1926.

== Selected works ==
- 1972: Ein yrkjari á útoyggj (A Poet on an Outlying Island), collected works
