= Louis Zachariasen =

Faroese writer and politician

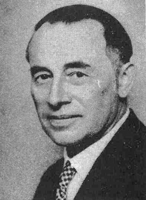
Louis Zachariasen

Louis Christian Oliver Zachariasen known as Louis Zachariasen (21 January 1890 in Kirkja, Fugloy – 30 August 1960) was a Faroese writer and politician for the New Self-Government party. He was the first deputy prime minister of the Faroe Islands after the islands received home rule in 1948.

Zachariasen received a degree as a schoolteacher from the Faroese Teachers School in Tórshavn in 1911 and attended a folk high school in Denmark in 1915. In 1918 he received his examen artium, and in 1924 he received a master of science in engineering (Danish: cand.polyt.) from Polyteknisk Læreanstalt in Copenhagen. He moved back to the Faroe Islands, where he was employed by the Faroese Telephone Company (Telefonverk Føroya Løgtings) in 1925, and was the CEO from 1936 to 1952. He was also the president of the Collegium Academicum Faeroense from 1933 to 1942.

== Bibliography ==
- 1926 – Páll fangi, play
- 1951 – Á leiðini, poems
- 1952 – Úr Føroya søgu um 1700 (Faroese history around 1700)
- 1961 – Føroyar sum rættarsamfelag 1535–1655 (Faroe Islands as a community governed by law 1535-1655)
- 1978 – Sóttin svarta - short stories and the play Páll fangi
- 1978 – Abbastova, novel. First appeared as a serial in the Christmas magazine Følv from 1955 to 1959, and was first published in a book in 1978.

== Faroese language conflict ==
Zachariasen took an active part in the Faroese language conflict. He and others worked for the right to use the Faroese language in all official matters. He had a degree as a school teacher, but he refused to teach the Faroese children in the Danish language, as the law ordered him to do. He therefore stopped working as a teacher in protest and moved to Denmark for some years in order to get further education. He also took an active part in the Faroese language conflict by writing poems, plays, novels and other texts in Faroese.

== Family ==
His parents were both from the island Fugloy; they were Malena Frederikka Simonsen from Hattarvík and Símun Mikkjal Zachariasen from Kirkja. His brother, Símun Petur Zachariasen, was also a politician and member of the Faroese parliament. Louis Zachariasen was the grandfather of the Tjóðveldi politician Kristina Háfoss. Louis Zachariasen married Kristina Frederikka Hentze from Sandur, and they lived in Tórshavn.
