= Skaalum =

Skaalum is a Faroese language surname. Notable people with the surname include:

- Jens Pauli Skaalum (1893–1978), Faroese teacher and politician, son of Óli
- Noah Skaalum (born 1995), Danish singer
- Óli Niklái Skaalum (1849–1924), Faroese teacher and politician
