= Faroese Teachers School =

College in Tórshavn in the Faroe Islands

- Føroya Læraraskúli
- Other names: Fróðskaparsetur Føroya
- Type: College, part of the University of the Faroe Islands
- Established: 1870
- Location: Tórshavn, Faroe Islands; 62.0057°N 6.7823°W

The Faroese Teachers School (Faroese: Føroya Læraraskúli) is a college in Tórshavn in the Faroe Islands, which became part of the University of the Faroe Islands on 1 August 2008. Since 2008 it has offered bachelor's degrees in general and specialized education; before 2008, education students did not receive a BA. The school's four-year program in general education qualifies graduates for teaching positions in primary schools and preschools in the Faroe Islands and Denmark.

The Faroese Teachers School was founded as the Faroese Normal School in 1870, when many teachers were needed in primary schools after the introduction of compulsory education in 1846. Gregers Joensen and Óli Niklái Skaalum were members of the first graduating classes, and later many prominent persons attended the school. There has been no other teacher training program in the Faroe Islands since the establishment of the Faroese Teachers School. Today the school is part of the University of the Faroe Islands and is also affiliated with the Faroese Research Council (Faroese: Granskingarráðið).

== Alumni ==
- Gregers Joensen (1871)
- Óli Niklái Skaalum (1872)
- Jógvan Poulsen (1876)
- Símun Mikkjal Zachariasen (1878)
- Jákup Dahl (1896)
- Símun Petur Zachariasen (1908)
- Louis Zachariasen (1911)
- Johan H. Danbjørg (1917)
- Johan Kallsoy (1917)
- Peter Mohr Dam (1920)
- Marius Johannesen (1926)
- Óli Dahl (1938)
- Rólant Lenvig (1950)
- Villi Sørensen (1954)
- Øssur Dam Jacobsen (1964)
- Øssur av Steinum (1964)
- Signar Hansen (1969)
- Jóannes Eidesgaard (1977)
- Jógvan á Lakjuni (1977)
- Bjarni Djurholm (1982)
- Annita á Fríðriksmørk (1992)
- Bjørn Kalsø (1999)
- Jóanis Nielsen (1999)
