= Faroese language conflict =

Political and cultural argument over the official language of the Faroe Islands

The Faroese language conflict is a phase in the history of the Faroe Islands in the first half of the 20th century (approx. 1908 to 1938). It was a political and cultural argument between advocates of Faroese and Danish to serve as the official language of the Faroe Islands.

At the beginning of the 20th century, the language of the church, public education, the government, and the law was Danish, but Faroese was the language of ordinary people. The orthography of Faroese had been set by Venceslaus Ulricus Hammershaimb in the middle of the 19th century, and the language had aroused Faroese nationalism since the Christmas Meeting of 1888 or Jólafundurin.

The conflict was not so much a struggle between the Faroe Islanders and the Danes, but rather among the Faroese themselves. The positions evolved with time.

The Norwegian language conflict between Bokmål and Nynorsk presents some similar aspects.

== Political camps ==
The two political parties staking out positions on the language conflict were the Union Party (Sambandsflokkurin), which wanted continued union with Denmark; and the New Self-Government (Sjálvstýrisflokkurin), which desired independence from Denmark. Later two other political parties which also desired independence from Denmark were created: People's Party (Fólkaflokkurin, a right-wing separatist party) in 1939 and the Republican Party (now Republic, Tjóðveldi, a left-wing separatist party) in 1948. These two parties have also worked for more rights for speakers of the Faroese language.

=== Position of the Samband ===
The view of the Samband (unionists) was that the Faroese language should be developed and used in the literary field. However, the Danish language should continue to be the official language of education, which all Faroese should speak and understand. The unionists also opposed the comprehensive introduction of Faroese for the catechism, which they accused Sjálvstyri of wanting.

Samband had two major arguments for the use of Danish in education: they said that advanced education was possible only if Faroese students understood Danish well enough to be able to study in Denmark; and moreover, there were too few Faroese-language school books for the people of the small islands.

=== Position of the Sjálvstyri ===
The Sjálvstyri (separatists) had national sentiment on their side. They regarded it as untenable that the official language could be other than the native language. The party program formulated a core demand that the Faroese language should become the language of instruction in all subjects. At the same time the party tried to use the language conflict to further its separatist goals.

They had a consistency argument for Faroese as the language of instruction: in the other parts of the Danish kingdom education was conducted in the native language: Icelandic in Iceland, Greenlandic or Kalaallisut in Greenland, and English in the Danish West Indies (from 1917 the United States Virgin Islands). It was thus a question of equal treatment for all areas under the Danish crown.

== Revival as the language of instruction ==
History worked for the demands of Sjálvstyri. 1908 is considered to be the start of the conflict, which persisted until 1938. In 1908 the teachers of the sixth-form secondary school in Tórshavn (the capital) petitioned the school administration to be allowed to use Faroese in teaching. The administration responded with a partial refusal: Faroese could be used only as an aid, in order to explain certain things. Jákup Dahl, who later became the Provost, was opposed to the administration's ruling and refused to teach in Danish; from then on he taught in Faroese. The school administration referred the issue to the Danish education ministry, which referred it to the Løgting, the Faroese parliament, who could not agree on the issue and in 1910 split into two sides, a majority opinion and a minority opinion. The majority opinion was represented by Samband: Danish was more important as a foreign language than others such as German and English, and the pupils were to hear and speak Danish in all subjects. An important argument for this was that Danish was a key to the higher education in Denmark, and thus was important for the young people's vocational progress.

The Sjálvstyri maintained their previous position, that it was natural and understandable that a people should be taught in their native language. But they did not dispute that there were no appropriate teaching materials in Faroese. So they proposed that it should be left to each teacher in which language he taught.

As a compromise, it was planned that Faroese was to be used as the language of instruction for the younger children. For the older students, fundamental instruction would be in Danish with Faroese permitted as an aid to instruction. On 16 January 1912, this regulation was passed by the Danish government as §7 of the Faroese school regulations.

Although it could be rated as a partial success of Sjálvstyri, their demands remained on the agenda of the party after passage of the §7 regulation. Louis Zachariasen in Velbastaður was the first teacher to oppose the regulation openly, and he refused to teach further in Danish. This contravened the regulation that "Faroese was to be used only as an auxiliary language". Zachariasen quit publicly as a teacher and became one of the "separatist martyrs".

The language conflict entered a new phase in 1918, when the question was raised of why Faroese spelling was still not a compulsory subject in the schools. In the above-mentioned school regulations of 1912, this question had been deliberately ignored, since many Faroese teachers did not have sufficient knowledge of the orthography of their native language. However, there were already efforts under way to address this problem, as summer vacation courses in Faroese orthography were being conducted. As the time seemed ripe, the Løgting requested the Danish government to introduce Faroese spelling as a compulsory subject. The Danish education ministry immediately agreed, but §7 remained unchanged.

The language conflict became more abstract and it became a matter of a finding suitable formulation for instruction. Efforts were made to find a good way to teach Faroese, while still guaranteeing that the students would have an appropriate knowledge of Danish to further their higher education. The Ministry of Education in Copenhagen suggested in 1925 that Faroese should become the language of general instruction, but that Danish should be the language of instruction in geography and history. At that time the party of the Samband rebelled because they believed that the new rules went too far in separating the Faroese from the Danish. As a result, the majority in the Løgting rejected the new regulations.

In the Løgting elections of 1936, the Social Democratic Party (Javnaðarflokkurin, Social Democratic Party) substantially increased its representation at the expense of the Samband. Together with the Self-Government party, the Social Democrats changed the law to replace the Danish language with Faroese. On 13 December 1938, the Danish government agreed.

== Revival as church language ==
Since the Reformation in Denmark–Norway and Holstein in the 16th century, Danish had been the exclusive liturgical language in the Faroese archipelago.

In 1903 Faroese became permitted under certain conditions for use in the church: the communion must take place in Danish, and Faroese could be used to preach only if all church authorities, the Provost and local council agreed. From 1912 the communion service could be held in Faroese, but only if the bishop gave his consent beforehand.

Faroese Islanders achieved a general penetration of their first language as the church language. Most of the faithful conservatively associated the Danish language firmly with the liturgy, with the hymns, and not least with the Bible. Even today certain Faroese church songs are still sung in Danish. In Tórshavn an opinion poll was taken, and the majority of the churchgoers expressed a desire for the retention of Danish in church.

Nevertheless, the question was discussed several times in the Løgting, and some Union Party politicians argued pragmatically for the retention of Danish: many of the priests were Danes, and if each priest could choose in which language he preaches, this would lead to general confusion, e.g., if a community was accustomed to a church service in Faroese but then got a Danish pastor.

As with education, the penetration of the native language into the church was only a matter of time and depended on the availability of literature. As early as 1823 the Gospel of Matthew appeared in Faroese, but it met with no broad approval by the people because of the uncertainty of the Faroese orthography that prevailed before Hammershaimb's time. In 1908 the Gospel of John in Faroese was published, but only because the minister Jákup Dahl assisted the revival of Faroese as the church language; he presented a Faroese hymn book in 1921 and completed a translation of the New Testament in 1937. Up to his death in 1944 Dahl continued to work on a translation of the Old Testament, which was completed by Kristian Osvald Viderø in 1961.

The Evangelical Lutheran national church authorized each of Dahl's works immediately after it appeared. Dahl also translated the catechism and a religious history. Dahl's collection of sermons in book form became important for the Faroese. In the remote areas of the islands it was normal for a pastor to be in charge of up to six churches, which he visited in sequence. When the pastor could not be present the services in the churches were conducted by laymen, who used sermons from Dahl's printed collection.

13 March 1939 is the day on which Faroese became fully authorized as a church language. Today the native clergy use Faroese almost exclusively.

== Equality in legal proceedings ==
In 1920 the issue of the use of Faroese in legal proceedings was raised. That resulted from a reform in Denmark, that applies now in court, whereas previously it applied only to written legal documents. On 11 April 1924, a regulation came into force in the Faroes which laid down that the legal language was Danish, but that Faroese-speaking judges may hold their proceedings in Faroese if the parties to the legal action speak Faroese. The legal documents could also be drawn up in Faroese, providing that a certified translation into Danish was also made, if prescribed by law, or required by the defence. These Danish documents would be important if proceedings on appeal were to take place in Denmark.

In 1931 further demands were made to expand the use of Faroese in legal proceedings. These were resisted by the Samband who said that Danish documents were indispensable for further hearings in Danish courts.

On 4 January 1944, the Løgting legislated the full equality of Faroese in legal proceedings. That happened because of the special situation of the Faroe Islands in World War II, when Denmark was occupied by Germany and all connections with the government in Copenhagen were severed. However, this law remained in force after the war.

== Faroese in other areas ==
The introduction of Faroese as the business language took place over a longer period of time. Starting in 1920, the Faroese telephone directory appeared in the national language. Starting in 1925 it was the secondary language in the Postverk Føroya or postal service, and starting in 1927 the minutes of the Løgting were recorded in Faroese.

With the autonomy (home-rule) law of 1948, Faroese was finally the language used in all affairs, with the proviso that Danish should be taught in school.

== See also ==
- Norwegian language conflict
