= Álvur Zachariasen =

Faroese politician (1931–2022)

Álvur Zachariasen (5 June 1931 – 28 June 2022) was a Faroese foreman, teacher, and politician for the Home Rule Party.

== Biography ==
Zachariasen was born in Klaksvík, the son of Símun Petur Zachariasen and Maria Henriksen. He is also the nephew of the writer and politician Louis Zachariasen. Zachariasen graduated as a ship's captain in 1957 and was a foreman at the Lauritzen shipping company from 1955 to 1964, after which he held an equivalent position at the Faroe Ship (Faroese: Skipafelagið Føroyar) shipping company until 1971. After this he was a teacher at the Klaksvík Nautical School (Faroese: Klaksvíkar Sjómansskúla) from 1972 to 1998.

Zachariasen was a member of the municipal council for Klaksvík from 1980 to 1997. He also served as a representative of the Norðoyar district for the Home Rule Party in the Faroese Parliament from 1994 to 1998.

Zachariasen died on 28 June 2022, at the age of 91.

== Parliamentary committees ==
- 1994–1998: head of the Business Committee
- 1994–1998: member of the Finance Committee
- 1994–1998: member of the Industry Committee
- 1994–1998: member of the Fisheries Committee
