= Sauternes =

Sauternes can refer to:

- Sauternes, Gironde, a town in the Bordeaux region of France
- Sauternes (wine), an appellation for sweet Bordeaux wine produced around the town Sauternes
- The SS Sauternes, a World War II steamship built in 1922
