= Church of the Faroe Islands =

State church of the Faroe Islands

- Fólkakirkjan
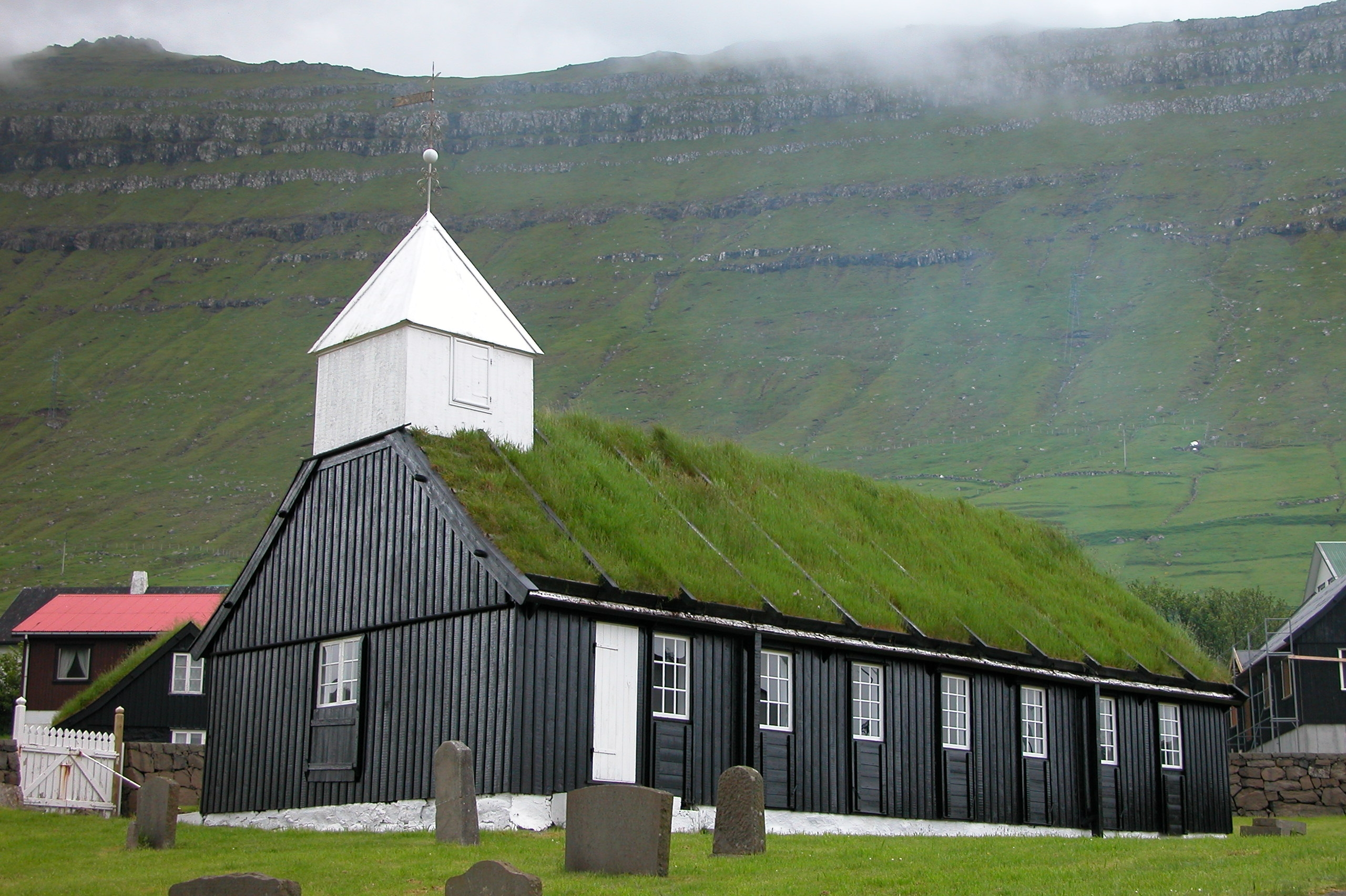
- The old wooden church of Gøta.
- Type: Communion
- Classification: Protestant
- Orientation: Lutheran
- Scripture: Protestant Bible
- Theology: Lutheranism
- Polity: Episcopal
- Bishop: Jógvan Fríðriksson
- Provost: Maria Jørðdal Niclasen
- Associations: Lutheran World Federation; World Council of Churches; Conference of European Churches; Porvoo Communion; Communion of Protestant Churches in Europe
- Region: Faroe Islands
- Independence: 29 July 2007
- Branched from: Church of Denmark
- Members: 41,584 (2025)
- Official website: www.folkakirkjan.fo

The Church of the Faroe Islands (Faroese: Fólkakirkjan, lit. 'people's church'; Danish: Færøernes folkekirke), also known as the Faroese People's Church, is the established church and the largest religious organization in the Faroe Islands. It is an Evangelical Lutheran church, continuing the Lutheran tradition established during the Protestant Reformation. The church is one of the smallest state churches in the world. Prior to becoming independent on 29 July 2007, it was a diocese of the Church of Denmark, also a Lutheran church. As of 2025, 76.1% of Faroe Islanders belonged to the state church.

Other churches in the Faroe Islands include the Plymouth Brethren and the Roman Catholic Church.

== History ==
=== Christianization ===
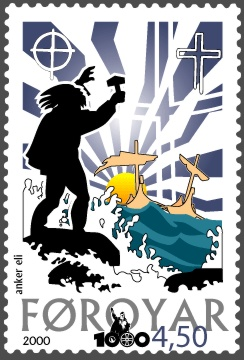
Depiction of Tróndur í Gøtu raising the hammer of Thor against the arrival of Christianity in the Faroes on a 2000 stamp

According to Færeyinga saga, the Viking chief Sigmundur Brestisson brought Christianity to the Faroe Islands. On the orders of the Norwegian king Olaf Tryggvason, Sigmundur forced the island people to convert to Christianity in 999. Resistance to the new religion led by the notorious Tróndur í Gøtu was quickly suppressed, and even though Sigmundur himself lost his life, Christianity gained a foothold.

=== Catholic era ===
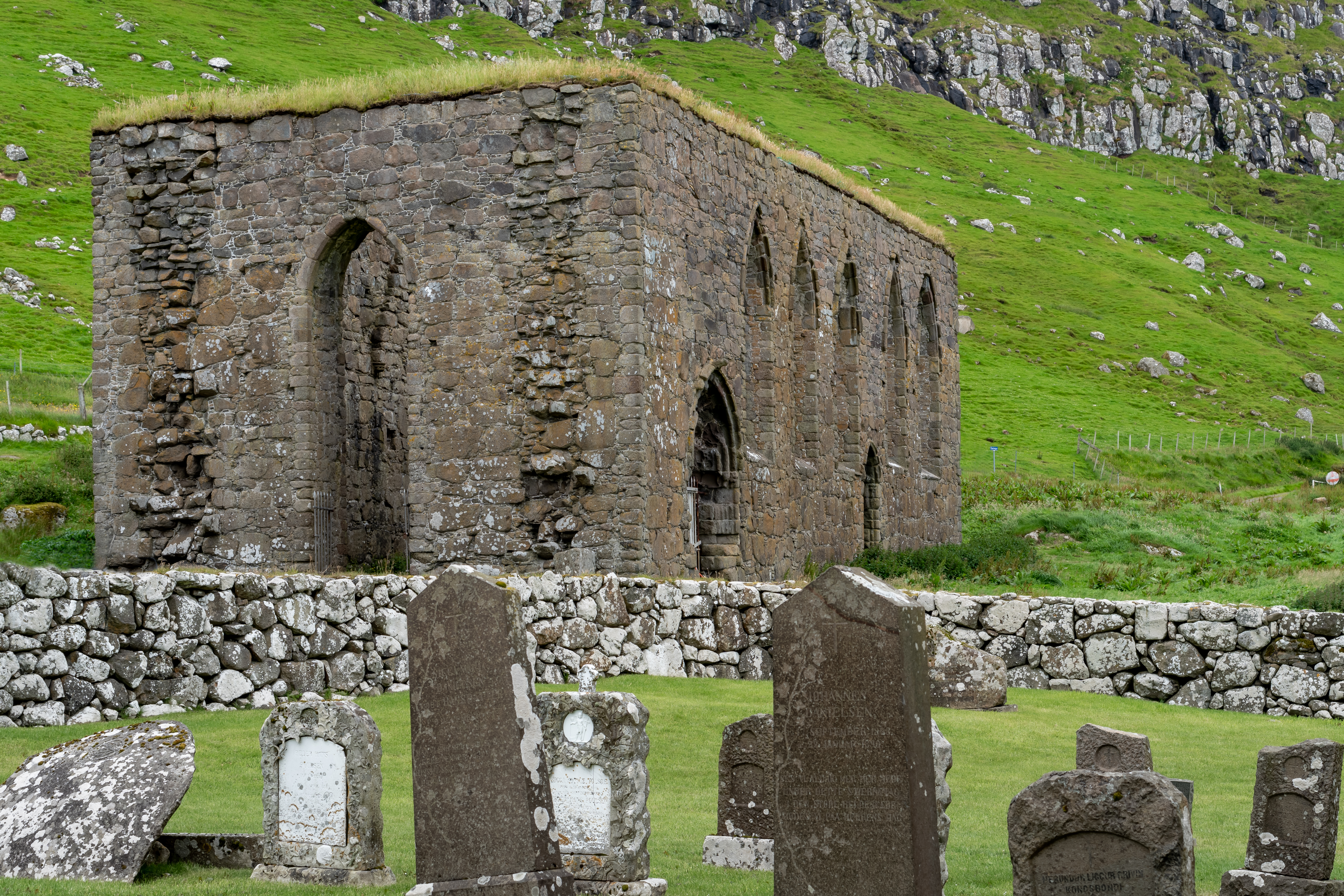
Magnus Cathedral

Some years after the introduction of Christianity, the Faroese church was established as a diocese, with an episcopal residence in Kirkjubøur, and suffragan to several metropolitical sees in succession, but eventually (after 1152) subject to the archdiocese of Nidaros (Tróndheim). There were probably 33 bishops in the Faroe Islands between the time Christianity was introduced to the islands and the Reformation, but there is little information available about the Faroes during the Middle Ages.

The historical narratives of the Faroe Islands, as depicted in their sagas, suggest a complex relationship between the church and the population. The saga of the battle of Mannafallsdal includes scenarios where church authorities acquired landholdings and implemented taxation which led to social unrest and rebellion. However, the accuracy and historical veracity of these sagas are subject to scholarly debate. They offer a perspective rich in cultural context but may not always align with historical facts.

Contemporary documentation does corroborate some elements of these narratives, such as the destruction of the bishop's residence in Kirkjubø and the subsequent removal of Bishop Erlend from the islands by royal decree, with his eventual death in Bergen in 1308.

=== The Reformation ===
In 1538, the last Catholic bishop in the Faroe Islands was removed from his position. His Protestant replacement lasted only a few years, and then he left the islands as well, as a dean took over as the representative of the church under the Bishop of Zealand in Denmark.

=== Lutheran Church ===
The form of Lutheranism advocated by Zealand Bishop Jesper Brochmand played a notable role in the religious landscape of the Faroes, having a more prolonged presence than in other parts of the Kingdom of Denmark. Brochmand's devotional writings, believed to date from around 1650, along with the hymns of Thomas Kingo from 1699, had a considerable influence on the spiritual and cultural life of the Faroe Islands until the 20th century. The term "Brochmandslestur" has been coined in contemporary language to describe lengthy and, in some opinions, monotonous texts and speeches.

=== Nationalist revival ===
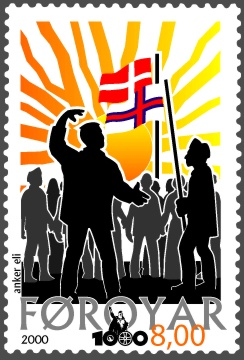
Faroese clergymen played a major part in the National awakening and language conflict, which was a conflict within Faroese society rather than with the Danish.

The lifting of the Danish trade monopoly in 1856 led to a resurgence of Faroese culture, which had been suppressed for a long time. This influenced the Christianity that was practiced and observed on the islands.

In the early 20th century, after considerable debate and effort, Faroese language gained equal status with Danish in religious practices, specifically in hymns and sermons, around 1924-25. This was extended to ecclesiastical rituals such as christenings, burials, and marriages in 1930.

A pivotal figure in this linguistic and cultural shift was Dean Jákup Dahl, who translated the New Testament from Greek, publishing it in 1937. Following Dahl's death in 1944, his work was continued by Vicar Kristian Osvald Viderø, who translated the rest of the Bible from Hebrew. The first authorized Faroese edition of the Bible was published in 1961.

The year 1963 saw two notable developments: the publication of the first Faroese hymn book and the elevation of the ecclesiastical position of dean to deputy bishop. The church's first female vicar was ordained in 1977. Then, in 1990, the Faroe Islands were established as an independent diocese within the Church of Denmark, appointing their own bishop.

=== 21st century ===
In 2005, the Faroes signed a treaty with Denmark that allowed for the take over of most public institutions, including the Vágar Airport and the church. On 29 July 2007, on the date of the national holiday, Ólavsøka, the Faroese Church became totally independent of the Church of Denmark.

In 2025, the church became a part of the Porvoo Communion, a communion incorporating Anglican and Lutheran churches in Europe.

== Membership statistics ==
Year	Population	Church members	Percent	Annual change
2001	46,127	38,883	84.3%	—N/a
2002	46,940	39,469	84.1%	0.2% ▼
2003	47,647	39,925	83.8%	0.3% ▼
2004	48,147	40,262	83.6%	0.2% ▼
2005	48,298	40,401	83.6%	0.0%
2006	48,120	40,243	83.6%	0.0%
2007	48,262	40,298	83.5%	0.1% ▼
2008	48,303	40,170	83.2%	0.3% ▼
2009	48,604	40,272	82.9%	0.3% ▼
2010	48,486	40,071	82.6%	0.3% ▼
2011	48,431	39,881	82.3%	0.3% ▼
2012	48,178	39,576	82.1%	0.2% ▼
2013	48,030	39,409	82.1%	0.0%
2014	48,122	39,372	81.8%	0.3% ▼
2015	48,591	39,605	81.5%	0.3% ▼
2016	49,096	39,793	81.1%	0.4% ▼
2017	49,786	40,152	80.6%	0.5% ▼
2018	50,459	40,483	80.2%	0.4% ▼
2019	51,263	40,838	79.7%	0.5% ▼
2020	52,084	41,242	79.2%	0.5% ▼
2021	52,859	41,580	78.7%	0.5% ▼
2022	53,524	41,810	78.1%	0.6% ▼
2023	54,077	41,712	77.1%	1.0% ▼
2024	54,472	41,705	76.6%	0.4% ▼
2025	54,609	41,584	76.1%	0.5% ▼
Source: Statistics Faroe Islands

== Leadership ==
The Bishop (Biskupur) of the Faroe Islands is the Right Reverend Jógvan Fríðriksson, who is the church's chief pastor. Born on 19 February 1957, he was ordained in 1985 and worked as a parish priest on the Faroese island of Eysturoy. He was consecrated as bishop in 2007, and is the first bishop of the independent Church of the Faroe Islands, following its independence from the Church of Denmark. The Bishop's seat is at Tórshavn Cathedral.

The Cathedral Dean (Dómpróstur) of Tórshavn Cathedral is the Very Reverend Uni Næs. The Dean is the second most senior cleric, deputising for the Bishop in his absence, and sits ex officio on the Church of the Faroe Islands ministerial council.

There are about 25 ordained priests serving the churches and chaplaincies of the Church of the Faroe Islands. Around 60 churches and chapels are grouped into 14 parishes across the country. The Church of the Faroe Islands clergy directory lists 25 parish priests (Sóknarprestur), of whom one also serves as hospital chaplain, and one as diocesan exorcist.

=== Lists of bishops ===
- Jens Riber (1540–1556): the first Lutheran Bishop of the Faroe Islands

From 1556 until 1990, the Faroe Islands were part of the Diocese of Copenhagen. During this period, the islands did not have an independent bishopric.

- Hans Jacob Joensen (1990–2007): the first bishop since 1556 which marked the return of a separate diocesan identity for the Faroe Islands within the Church of Denmark
- Jógvan Fríðriksson (2007–present): first bishop of the independent Church of the Faroe Islands

== Notable clergymen ==
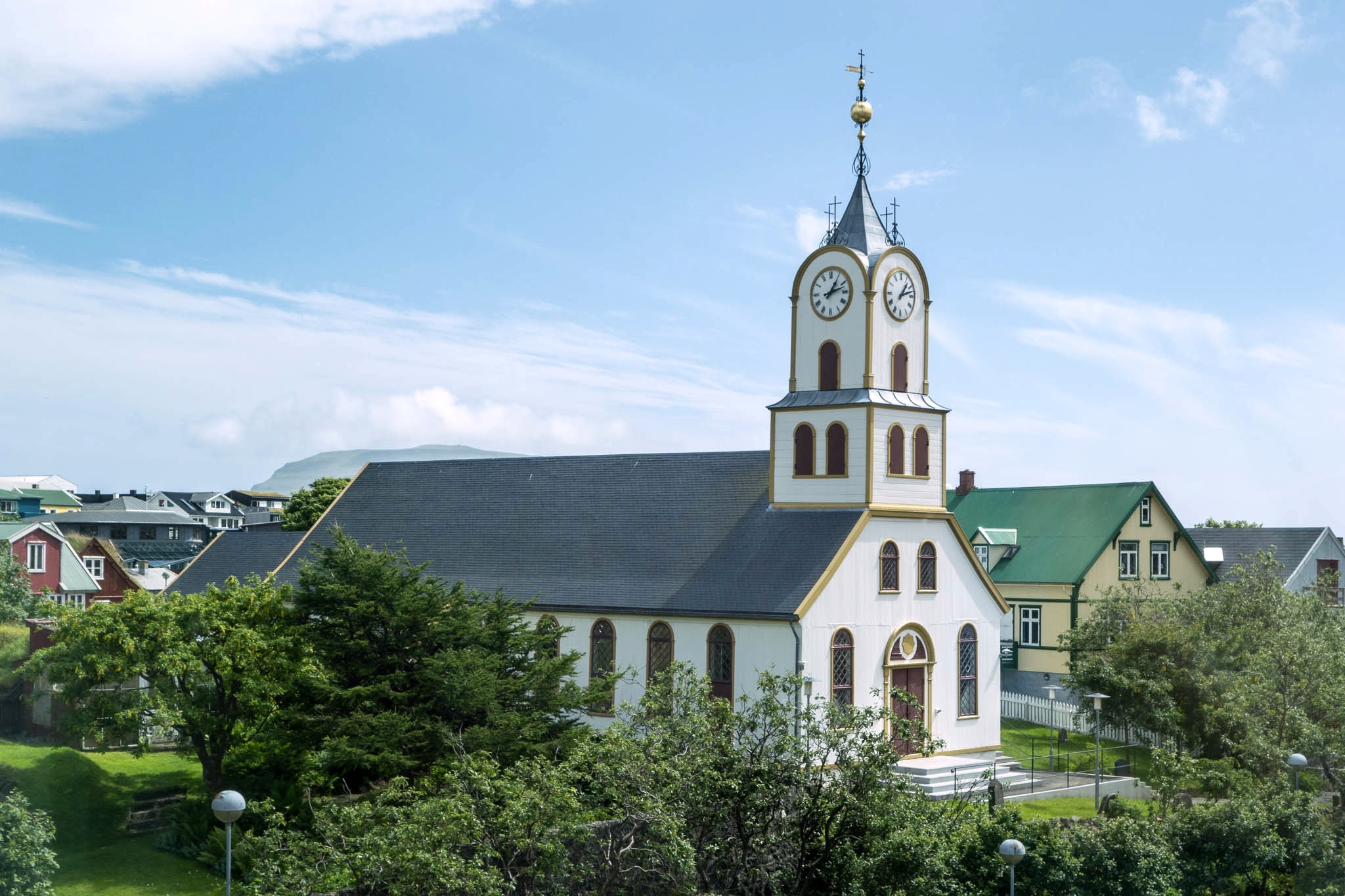
Tórshavn Cathedral

- Lucas Debes (1623-1675), Provost of the Faroes, issued the first book about the archipelago.
- V. U. Hammershaimb (1819-1909), Provost of the Faroes, invented the modern Faroese grammar.
- Fríðrikur Petersen (1858-1917), Provost of the Faroes, poet and politician.
- Jákup Dahl (1878-1944), Provost of the Faroes, Bible translator.
- Kristian Osvald Viderø (1906-1991), theologian, finished Dahl's translation.

== See also ==
- Religion in the Faroe Islands
- Catholic Church in the Faroe Islands

=== Other Nordic national Lutheran churches ===
- Church of Denmark
- Estonian Evangelical Lutheran Church
- Evangelical Lutheran Church of Finland
- Church of Iceland
- Evangelical Lutheran Church of Ingria
- Evangelical Lutheran Church in Lithuania
- Church of Norway
- Church of Sweden
