= Jógvan Fríðriksson =

The Right Reverend Jógvan Fríðriksson
- Bishop of the Faroe Islands
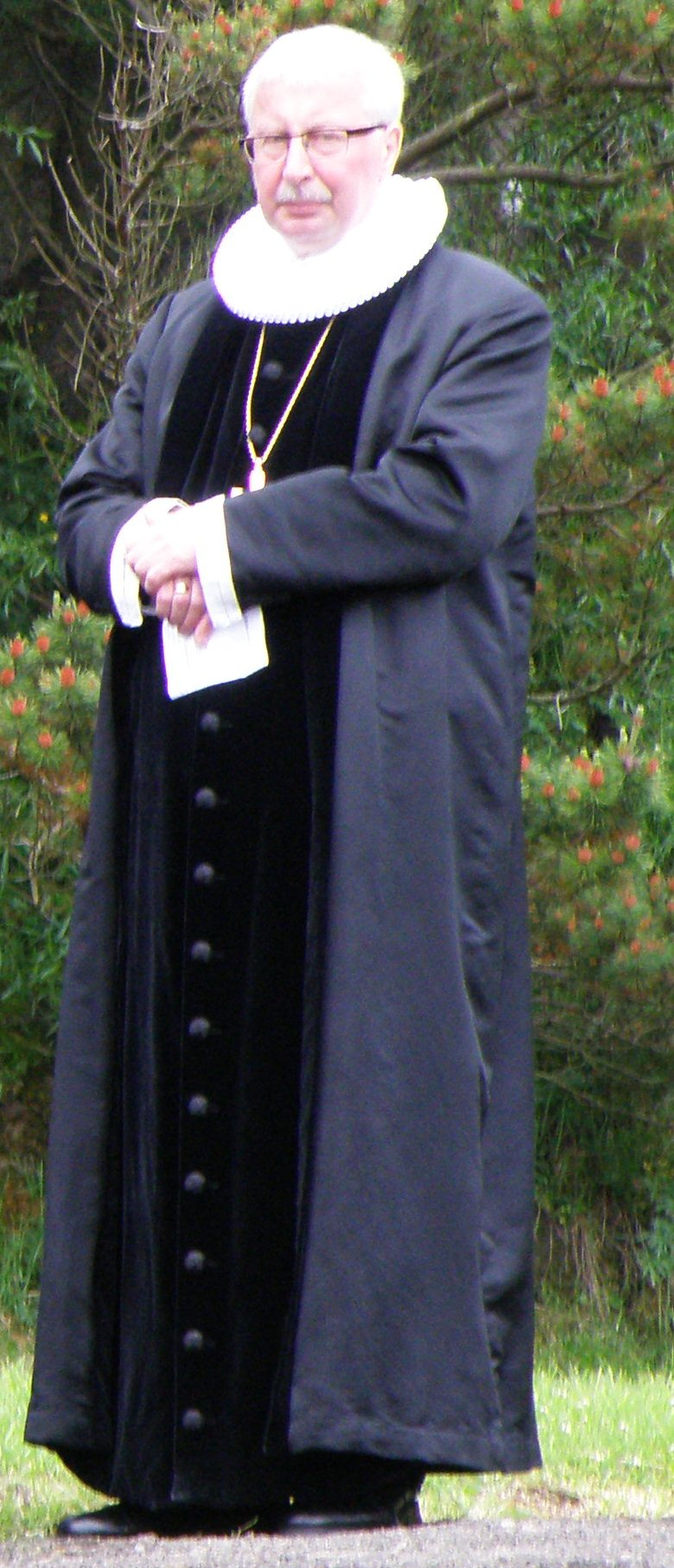
- Church: Church of the Faroe Islands
- Diocese: Faroe Islands
- Elected: 3 October 2007
- Installed: 1 December 2007
- Predecessor: Hans Jacob Joensen

Orders
- Ordination: 1985
- Consecration: 25 November 2007

Personal details
- Born: 19 February 1957 (age 69) Strendur, Eysturoy, Faroe Islands
- Denomination: Lutheran
- Education: Aarhus University

Jógvan Fríðriksson (born 19 February 1957 in Strendur) is the first bishop of the independent Church of the Faroe Islands.

== Biography ==
Fríðriksson was born on 19 February 1957 to Frederik and Elsebeth Malena Johansen. As a young man he was a sailor and in 1985 graduated in theology from Aarhus University. He served as a parish priest in the local church in the Faroe Islands from February 1986. From 1992 to 2007 he was parish priest of the churches in Skála, Strendur, Selatrað and Oyndarfjørður in the Sjóvar Municipality on the island of Eysturoy. After the Diocese of the Faroe Islands became an independent church from the Church of Denmark in 2007, Fríðriksson was elected as its Bishop on 3 October. On 25 November 2007 he was consecrated as a bishop in Tórshavn Cathedral and installed as bishop on 1 December.
