= Religion in the Faroe Islands =

Religion in the Faroe Islands in 2011
1. Christianity (95%)
2. None (4%)
3. Other religions (1%)

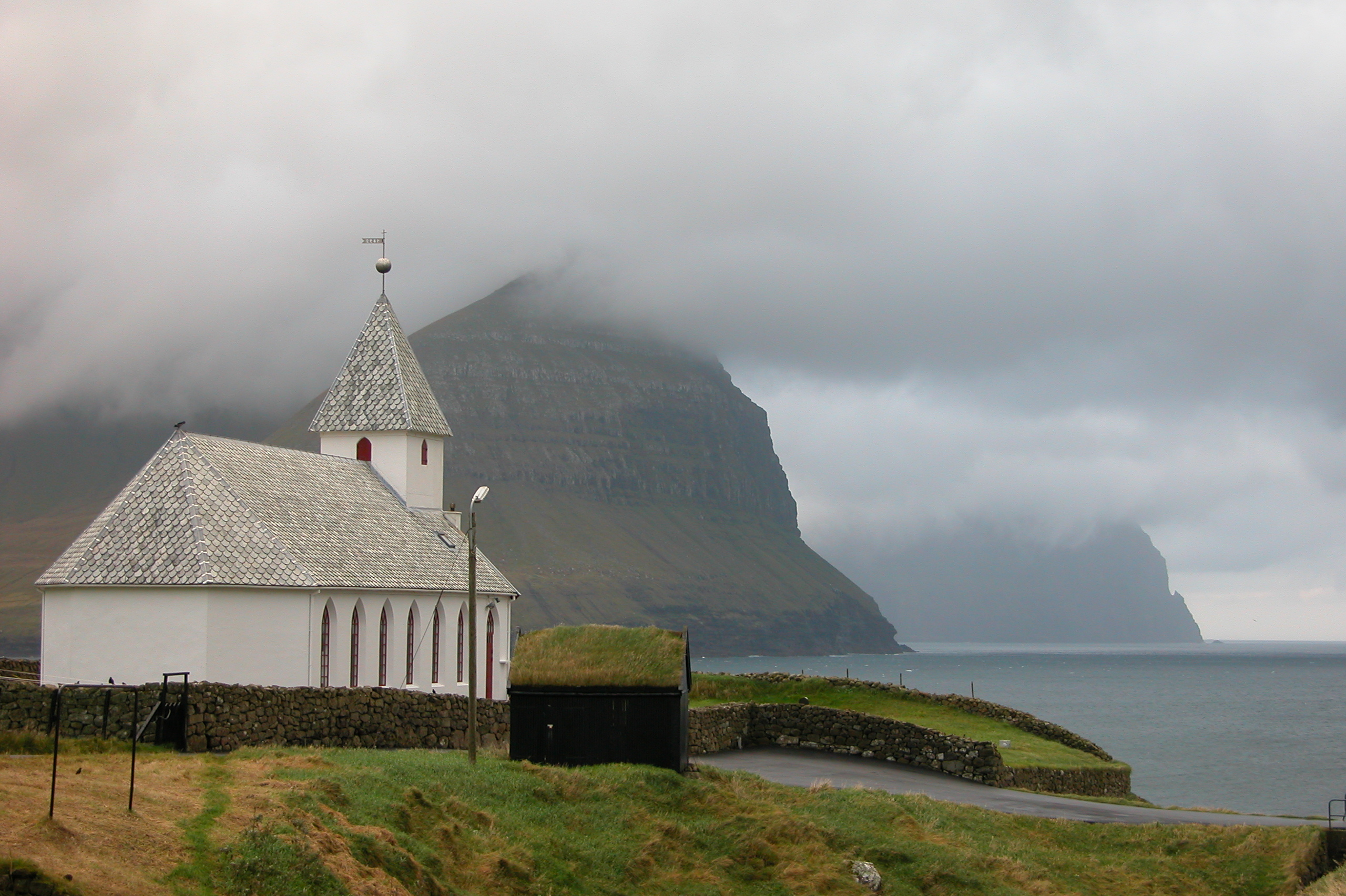
Church of Viðareiði (built 1892)

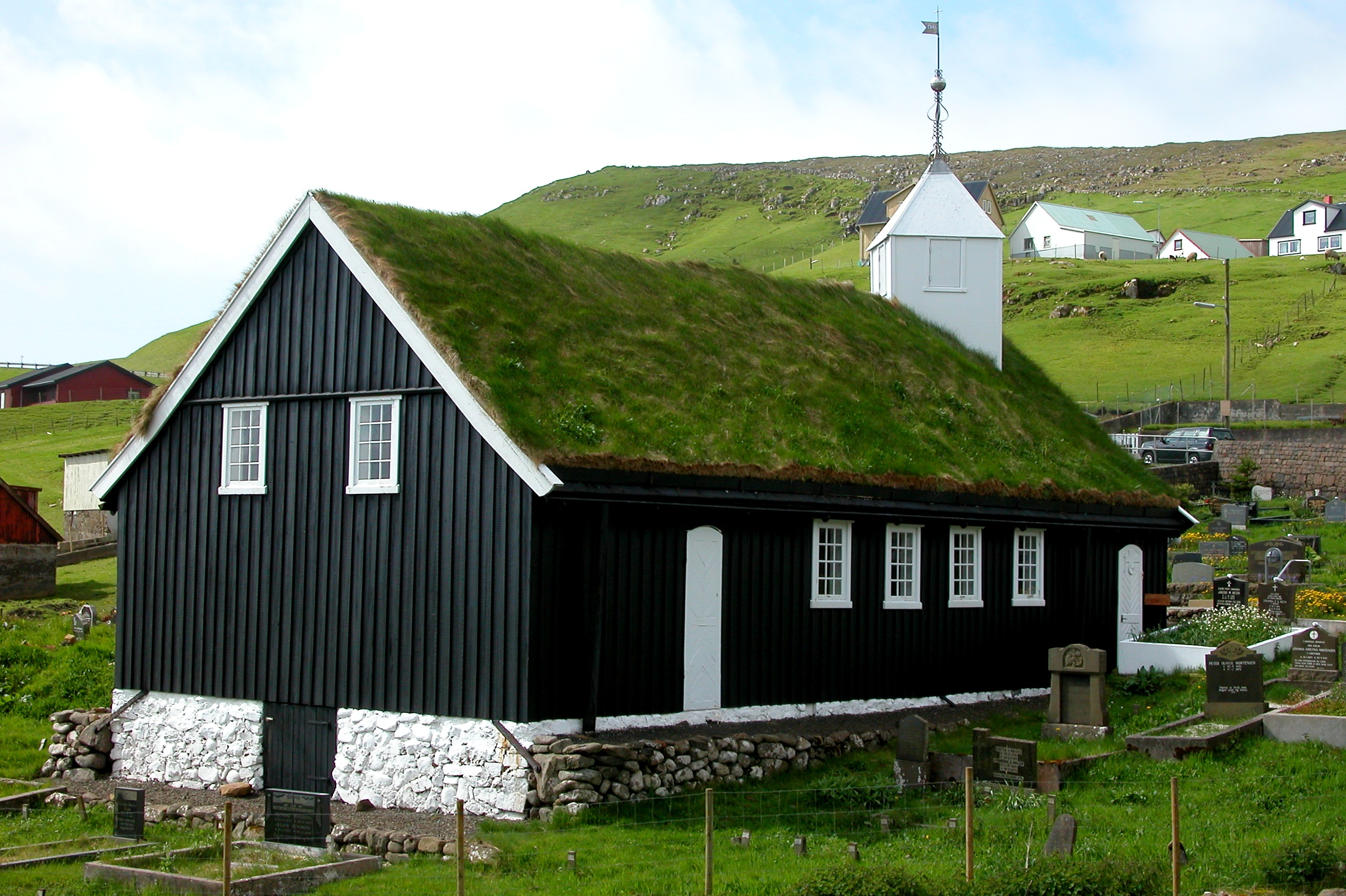
Porkeri Church (built 1847)

Religion in the Faroe Islands is dominated by the Lutheran Christianity. Historically linked to both Norway and Denmark, the islands' religious evolution reflects a blend of Norse traditions and Danish influences. Although the Lutheran Church remains predominant, the islands also host an array of other religious groups, including smaller Protestant denominations, Catholics, and followers of non-Trinitarian religions.

After gaining religious independence in 2007, the Church of the Faroe Islands became the established religion. Before this shift, the Church of Denmark played a pivotal role in the spiritual life of the Faroese people. Notably, the religious fervor and observance in the Faroe Islands are considerably more intense than in Denmark, making it an essential facet of the Faroese cultural and social landscape.

== History ==
The Færeyinga saga is often cited with respect to the early spread of Christendom in the islands. The saga states that the king of Norway told Sigmund to go by ship to the Faroe Islands with orders from the King. Sigmund's orders were clear: he was supposed to make the 18 small islands Christian, which is what he did, according to the saga. This event is believed to have taken place around 1000, but the Faroese did not establish an organised congregation of the Catholic Church before around 1100, so there do appear to be some inconsistencies in the saga.

The islands, initially under Norwegian governance, transitioned to Danish jurisdiction in 1523. During this period, significant religious changes occurred. Ámundur Ólavsson, the last Catholic Bishop of the Faroe Islands, was succeeded by Jens Gregersøn Riber, the first Lutheran bishop, marking the transition to Lutheranism in 1540.

== Demographics ==
The religious demographics of the Faroe Islands are dominated by Christianity.

According to the 2011 Census: there were 33,018 Christians (95.44%), 23 Muslims (0.07%), 7 Hindus (0.02%), 66 Buddhists (0.19%), 12 Jews (0.03%), 13 Baháʼís (0.04%), 3 Sikhs (0.01%), 149 Others (0.43%), 85 with more than one belief (0.25%) and 1,397 with no religion (4.04%). The question was optional; 94% of the respondents answered.

The Catholic Church has around 270 adherents, representing 0.8% from Faroe population. There are also small groups of Seventh-day Adventists, Jehovah's Witnesses, and Ahmadi Muslims in the country.

== See also ==
- Church of the Faroe Islands (Fólkakirkjan)
- Catholic Church in the Faroe Islands
