= Johan H. Danbjørg =

Johan Hendrik Danbjørg
- Born: November 9, 1896; Porkeri, Faroe Islands
- Died: July 23, 1968 (aged 71); Porkeri, Faroe Islands

Johan Hendrik Danbjørg (November 9, 1896 – July 23, 1968) was a Faroese teacher and a politician for the Social Democratic Party.

Danbjørg was born in Porkeri, the son of Daniel Danielsen (a.k.a. Danial í Ungagarði) and Cathrina Maria Danielsen. He graduated from the Faroese Teachers School in 1917 and then taught in the Municipality of Sumba from 1917 to 1919, in Rituvík and Glyvrar from 1919 to 1920, and in Porkeri from 1920 to 1968. Danbjørg served in the Faroese Parliament as a representative from the Suðuroy district from 1936 to 1945 and again from 1950 until his death in 1968. He was the speaker of the parliament from 1940 to 1943. The politician Finnbogi Ísakson referred to Danbjørg as a parliamentary member of the "old school," with clear opinions on how to dress and behave in the parliament.

Danbjørg died in Porkeri on July 23, 1968.
