= Floksmenn =

Floksmenn is a folktale from the Faroe Islands.

The story centers on the easternmost village of Hattarvík on Fugloy during the Middle Ages. The tale of the Floksmenn is of a flok or group of rebels. The most notorious of the rebels, (as the Danish governmental and officials in Tórshavn referred to them) were Høgni Nev, Rógvi Skel, Hálvdan Úlvsson and Sjúrður við Kellingará from the village of Hattarvík. These men controlled and savaged the northern parts of the Faroe Islands for a long time. This is one of the most important separatist tales of the Faroe Islands.

The more intelligent Sjúrður við Kellingará was forced to go the more militant way of rebellion by Høgni Nev and Hálvdan Ulvsson, who were more criminally-minded than Sjúrður við kellingará. All four men were later caught and sentenced to death, but Sjúrður við kellingará was shown mercy and granted amnesty. The story is that he could not live with the crimes that he and the others had committed under their "little" rebellion and asked to be executed with the other floksmenn.

== Other sources ==
- Hammershaimb Venceslaus Ulricus and Jakobsen, Jakob (1886) Færøsk Anthologi (København, S.L. Møllers bogtrykkeri) ISBN 978-1-142-15610-7
