= Norske Løve (1704) =

Ship owned and operated by the Danish East India Company

Coordinates: 62°08′06″N 6°40′12″W

Norske Løve was a ship with 36 cannons owned and operated by the Danish East India Company.

== History ==
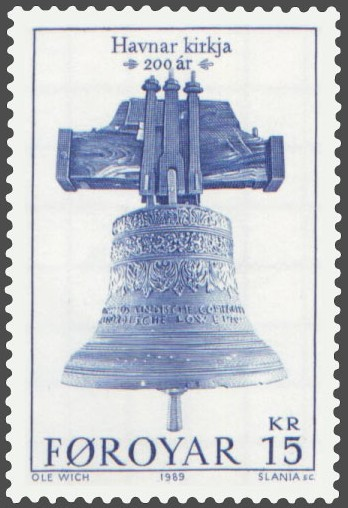
The bell of Norske Løve in Tórshavn Cathedral.

The ship's bell is dated to 1704, although a Norske Løve was recorded as running a cargo of slaves for the Danish East India Company in the Indian Ocean in 1682. Similarly, a Norske Løve is recorded calling at the Danish colony of Tranquebar in 1690 and 1706, although this may have been one of the numerous Dano-Norwegian Navy vessels of that name.

Norske Løve left Copenhagen on 4 December 1707. She was hit by lightning on December 18. On the 19th, her master Roluf Meincke decided to cut the main mast, which brought the mizzen mast down with it. Around noon the same day, a breaker hit her, killing 14 men and damaging the ship further. On 31 December 1707, Norske Løve sank in Lambavík in the Faroe Islands. Around 100 men survived.

Salvage of the ship began immediately, but a landslide during the night buried it, whence it has not been recovered. The ship's bell was removed, however, and subsequently used for Tórshavn Cathedral, where it still resides. A model of the ship was also constructed and hung as one of three votive ships within the church. (On the model, the name is spelled Nordishe Løwe.) A model ship in the church of Eiði is supposed to be a copy of the model in Tórshavn.

== Norska Løva in Faroese literature ==
A poem (folk song) about the event is commonly used accompanied with the Faroese chain dance in the Faroe Islands, it is written in Danish. The title is Norske Løve.

The Faroese author Jógvan Isaksen has written a crime novel with the title Norska Løva, published in 2010.

== See also ==
- History of the Danish navy
- Danish East India Company
