= Fugloyarfjørður =

Firth separating Svínoy from Fugloy in the Faroe Islands

Coordinates: 62°19′N 6°19′W

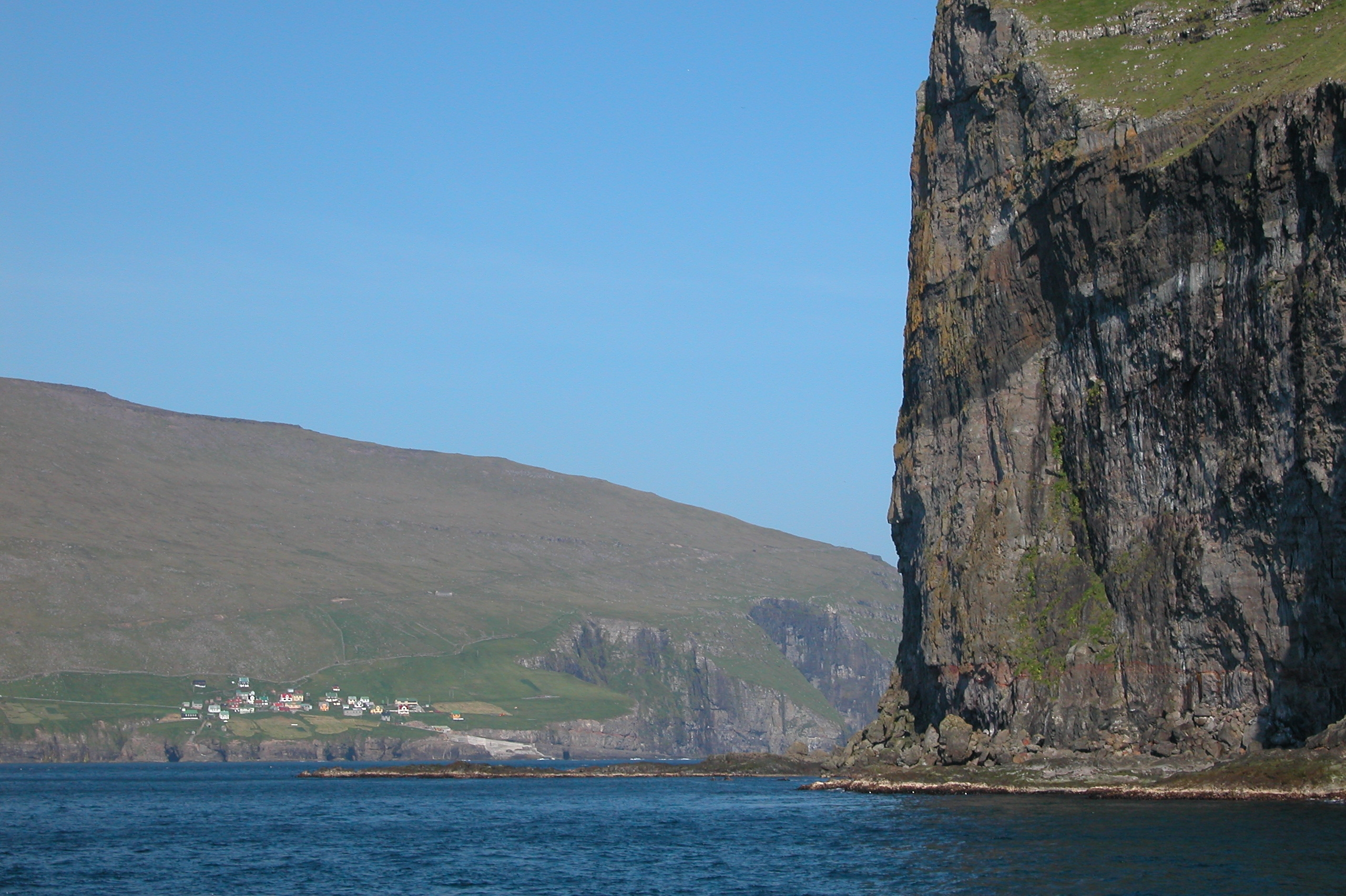
View towards Kirkja on Fugloy, with Svínoy in the foreground at right.

Fugloyarfjørður is the firth separating Svínoy from Fugloy in the Faroe Islands.
