= Catholic Church in the Faroe Islands =

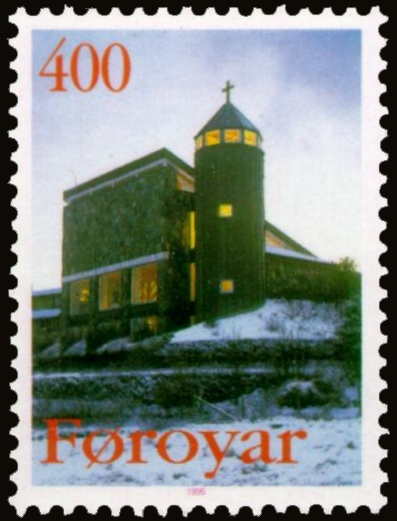
St Mary's Church in Tórshavn

The Catholic Church in the Faroe Islands (Faroese: Katólska Kirkjan í Føroyum) goes back to the year 999, when king Olav Tryggvason of Norway sent Sigmundur Brestisson on a mission to the islands with several priests. The islands became an independent diocese in 1111, but were officially reformed in 1537 and the last Catholic bishop was executed in 1538. After 1538, the Catholic Church was only revived in 1931 as a part of the bishopric of Copenhagen. The state church is now the Protestant Faroese People's Church.

Today there are around 300 registered Catholics from over 23 nations living on the Faroe Islands. Their center of worship is Mariukirkjan (St Mary's Church) in Tórshavn, the only Catholic church on the Faroes. Although the Catholic presence is small, the Church has had a large impact through the St. Francis school, run by the Franciscan Sisters since its establishment in 1933.

== Early history ==
Today, there is strong reason to believe that the first settlers on the Faroe Islands were Irish monks. They introduced sheep and oats to the Faroes. Latest archaeological excavations indicate that this could have been as early as in the 6th century. More information is available at The Irish Connection.

Catholic Bishop Erlend of the Faroes

In 999, the Norwegian king Olav Tryggvason sent the Viking chieftain Sigmundur Brestisson along with several priests to the Faroese in order to baptize the people and instruct them in the best of the Christian faith. The teachings were Catholic, as Norway was at that time.

In 1100, the Faroes were elevated to become the independent Faroese Diocese, and in the year 1111 the first Bishop took office in Kirkjubøur. During the next 400 years, 34 Catholic bishops resided in Kirkjubøur. The last bishop was Ámundur Ólavsson, who held his office until he was deposed in 1538.

== Protestant Reformation ==
In 1537, Christian III of Denmark made Norway a puppet state (along with the Faroe Islands) under the Danish Crown. In 1537, the king decreed that the official state churches in Norway, Denmark and the Faroes be reformed in accordance with the Lutheran doctrine adopted at the Augsburg Confession in 1530. In 1538, the old Catholic bishop's office was disestablished and the Faroe Islands received its first and only superintendent in 1540. The Crown confiscated all lands held by the Catholic Church, which had previously occupied about 40 percent of the Faroes.

== Bavarian Intermezzo ==
After the introduction of freedom of religion with the first Danish Constitution in 1849, there was an attempt to revive the Catholic Church on the Faroes. In 1857, Bavarian priest Georg Bauer arrived on the islands. He built a church in Rættará, Tórshavn, but did not find many followers; only seven people became Catholic, while some others only frequented his services. When Georg Bauer left the Faroes in 1880, he had no successor, and the church he had built in Rættará was left to decay.

By 1900, only one Catholic remained on the Faroes, in Hvítanes. She had a chapel to herself. Once every year, a priest from Copenhagen visited her to celebrate Mass.

== The Franciscan Sisters ==
In 1931, two young priests &mdash; E. G. Boekenogen (Dutch) and Thomas King (Scottish) &mdash; undertook the task of re-establishing a Catholic presence on the Faroes. In a house leased to the Franciscan sisters (who had come to the Faroes in 1931), a small church was consecrated on 23 May 1931. Among the first to visit this church were some elderly people who had in their youth attended Father Bauer's church.

The congregation soon outgrew the small church in Bringsnagøta, and together with the new school of St Francis (which the sisters had built), a new Church of Mary was consecrated on 1 June 1933.

The first sisters had arrived on the Faroe Islands in April 1931, in response to an appeal made by Cardinal Van Rossum to help the Faroese people and to re-establish the presence of the Catholic Church on the islands. Over the years, they built up a school, a crèche, and a nursery, and served the needs of the small Catholic community which gradually formed.

Today, there are approximately 240 Catholics of more than 20 nationalities in the Faroes.

The Franciscan sisters of the Faroe Islands were known for their good works and tolerance. They organized an annual bazaar, using the proceeds to fund their school. They also worked to alleviate the needs of the hungry of the world. Some students of the school were taken in as foster children. Faroese teachers taught in Faroese, even though the sisters themselves were foreigners from across Europe. They learned the Faroese language and spoke with an accent, which was called the "Nun Accent." It never disappeared. They also taught their students about the Bible, prayer and the basics of Christianity, although they were unable to teach the Catholic faith. Their lifestyle of tolerance served as a model for many Faroese people.

St Francis school was always a step ahead of the rest of the school system. In benchmark tests their students were always among the best.

In 1985, St Francis School came under the care of Tórshavn Town Council because the Franciscan sisters were too old to run it any more. Today they have 350 students and 30 teachers. The typical red school building of 1934, designed by the Faroese architect H. C .W. Tórgarð, is remembered by generations of Tórshavners who were instructed there.

The present Franciscan community is the only community of religious sisters on the islands. At the moment, it is made up of six sisters of five nationalities: Flemish, Maltese, Irish, Korean and Filipino. The primary mission of the sisters is to proselytise and support the small Catholic community on the islands; and to represent the Catholic Church more generally. Two of the sisters continue to work in the nursery established by the sisters; another works in an after-school centre. The sisters are also engaged in a variety of other apostolates: education; faith formation; prayer groups; inter-church activities; visiting the sick and the elderly; welcoming various groups; and charity.

== St Mary's Church Today ==
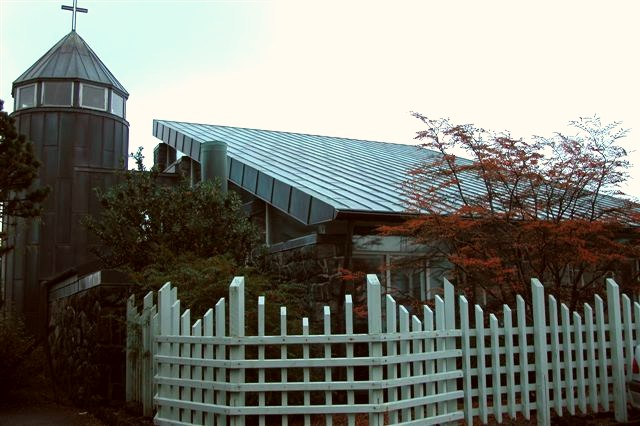
St Mary's Church is situated in Tórshavn's park, the only forest in the archipelago

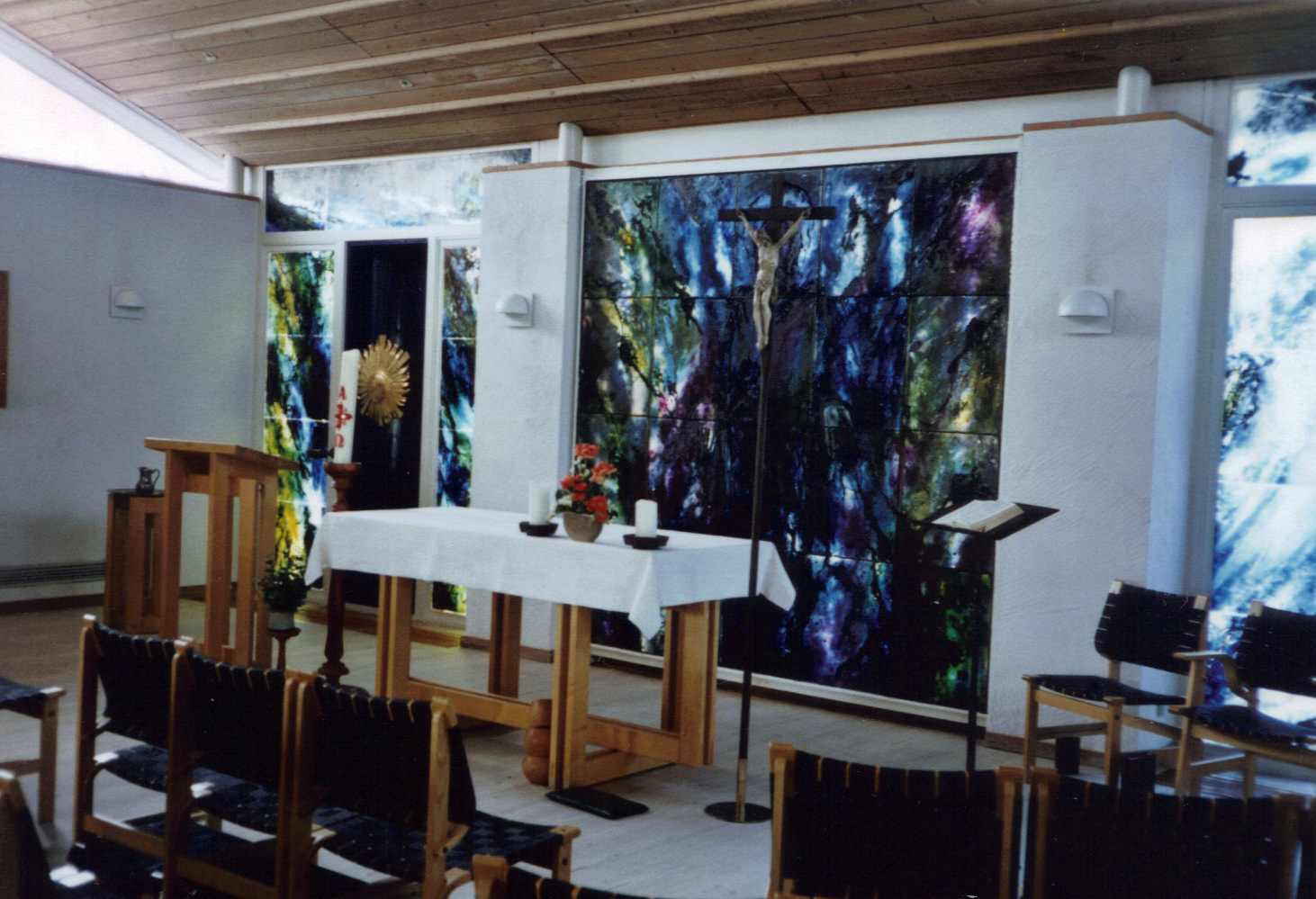
Interior of St Mary's Church.

The current St Mary's church was consecrated on 30 August 1987. The Catholic community gathers every Sunday at 11 o'clock for Mass. The atmosphere of the church invites one to prayer and stillness. "Kerit", the convent of the Franciscan sisters is to be found beside the church.

There are approximately 300 registered Catholics throughout the islands, at least a third of whom are Faroese. A few young parishioners trace their roots back five generations; others trace their roots back to their grandparents. Faroese people are received into the Catholic Church at regular intervals, the most recent being in July, 2020. Two Faroese parishioners represented the Catholic Church and the Faroe Islands during the visit of Pope John Paul II to Denmark in 1989. Both were attired in national dress and had the privilege of receiving Holy Communion from Pope John Paul. The non-Faroese parishioners come from many different nations: Denmark, and various countries of Eastern Europe, Asia, Africa, North and South America, and Oceania.

On Sunday, 25 June 2006, the parish community celebrated the 75th anniversary of the re-establishment of the Catholic Church on the Faroe Islands in 1931 and the founding of the present Catholic community. Bishop Kozon and then parish priest, Fr. Lars Messerschmidt, made a special weekend visit to the Faroes. Bishop Kozon was the main celebrant. The Mass was televised and transmitted on Faroese Television in the afternoon. The Lutheran bishop was a special guest. One of the tourists present at the celebration Mass was a former President of Ecuador (1992–97).

In the garden surrounding the church a variety of plants are grown. Many of them originate from remote areas of the Southern Hemisphere with growing conditions similar to those of the Faroe Islands. These plants symbolize the place of the St Mary's Church in the global Catholic community.

== See also ==
- Ancient Diocese of the Faroe Islands
- Diocese of Copenhagen
- Religion in the Faroe Islands
- Church of the Faroe Islands
- Ingi Rasmussen: "The teachers wore veils". In: Atlantic Review Autumn 2004, (Atlantic Airways, Sørvágur 2004), p. 5-8 (and on stamps.fo)
