= SS Sauternes =

Steamship built in 1922

History

United Kingdom
- Name: SS Sauternes
- Owner: Ministry of War Transport
- Launched: 1922
- Fate: Sank 7 December 1941

General characteristics
- Type: Steamship

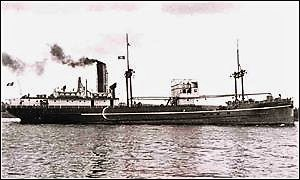

SS Sauternes was a steamship built in 1922. It was known as the Jólaskipið (the Christmas Ship) in the Faroe Islands. It sank in a storm in the firth Fugloyarfjørður within the Faroe Islands on 7 December 1941; all 25 passengers and crew were lost. The bodies of five of the service personnel who died are buried in Klaksvík old cemetery.

In addition to general cargo for the British garrison in the Faroes, Sauternes was also carrying 22,500 Danish kroner minted in the United Kingdom for use by the Faroese, since Denmark had been occupied by the Germans and was not sending any currency.
