= Jákup Dahl =

Faroese Provost and Bible translator

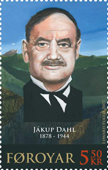
- Faroese stamps of 2007.
- Born: 5 June 1878; Vágur, Faroe Islands
- Died: 5 June 1944 (aged 66); Tórshavn, Faroe Islands
- Children: Regin Dahl

Jákup Dahl (English and German Jacob Dahl) (5 June 1878 – 5 June 1944) was a Faroese Provost and Bible translator. In 1908 he became known as a linguist with the first Faroese grammar lessons for school students.

== Life and work ==
Dahl was born on 5 June 1878 in Vágur on the island of Suðuroy in the Faroe Islands. He was the son of the merchant Peter Hans Dahl and Elisabeth Súsanna Vilhelm.

Dahl was a classmate of Janus Djurhuus at the high school in Tórshavn, the capital of the Faroes. Djurhuus described Dahl’s delivery of the nationalist hymn Nú er tann stundin komin til handa by Jóannes Patursson as his "linguistic baptism". While he was affiliated with Patursson's Party Sjálvstýrisflokkurin (Self-Government Party or Separatist Party), Jacob Dahl became famous during the Faroese language conflict, when he refused, as a teacher in Tórshavn 1909, to continue to teach in Danish. This matter back then was elevated to the Copenhagen ministry of instruction. One of his former students was William Heinesen, who reminisced about the time when Dahl still forced his students to use Danish.

In 1917 Dahl was elected Provost of the Faroes. In 1921 he published his translation of the Book of Psalms. The New Testament was published in 1937. Subsequently, he started the translation of the Old Testament, but was unable to finish it prior to his death in 1944. This task was then taken over by Kristian Osvald Viderø, to enable the Danske Folkekirke Church of Denmark (which immediately authorized Dahl’s translations) to finally present a Bible translation in Faroese language in 1961. Besides the Bible translation, Dahl also supplied a transliteration of the Catechism, a Bible story and a compilation of Faroese sermons for Layman Worships in remote villages. In addition Jákup Dahl translated dozens of church songs, including some by Martin Luther into his native language.

A Bible translation by Victor Danielsen already existed in 1948, but he based his on modern European editions, unlike Dahl’s translations from the older editions.

Jákup Dahl’s son Regin Dahl (1918–2007) is an important Faroese poet and composer.

== Works ==
- 1908: Føroysk mállæra til skúlabrúks. Tórshavn. (“Färöi language teachings for the school use”)
- 1913: Jólasálmar og morgun og kvøldsálmar (collection of Jákup Dahl and Símun av Skarði. Tórshavn: Fram - 30 pp. (Christmas carols and tomorrow and evening songs)
- 1928: Glottar. Tórshavn: H.N. Jacobsens Bókahandil - 96 pp.
- 1935: Ávegis. Tórshavn: H.N. Jacobsens Bókahandil 156 pp.
- 1948: Sólin og sóljan: Self-publishing house Regin Dahl. - 79 pp.
- 1948: Meðan hildið verður heilagt. Lestrarbók. Tórshavn: Føroyskt kirkjumál - 485 pp. (devotion book, lecture collection)
- 1970: Í jólahalguni. Sólarris. - Tórshavn: Heimamissiónsforlagið - 149 pp.
- Bíblia: Halgabók. Gamla testamenti og Nýggja. (From the original translations of Dahl and Viderø). Copenhagen: Det Danske Bibelselskab, 2000 - 1211 pp.

== Literature ==
- Jákup Reinert Hansen: Mellem kor og skib. Jacob Dahl’s færøske more postiller. Århus: Det teologiske Fakultet, Aarhus Universitet, 2003. - 422 pp. (in Danish with short German summary. Dissertations with support of the fund of Queen Margrethe II.)
  - Jákup Reinert Hansen: Mellem kor og skib. Tórshavn: Føroya Fróðskaparfelag, 2004. - 477 pp. ISBN 99918-41-39-3

== See also ==
- Faroese People's Church

== Sources ==
- German Wikipedia
