= Tórshavn Cathedral =

- Havnar Kirkja
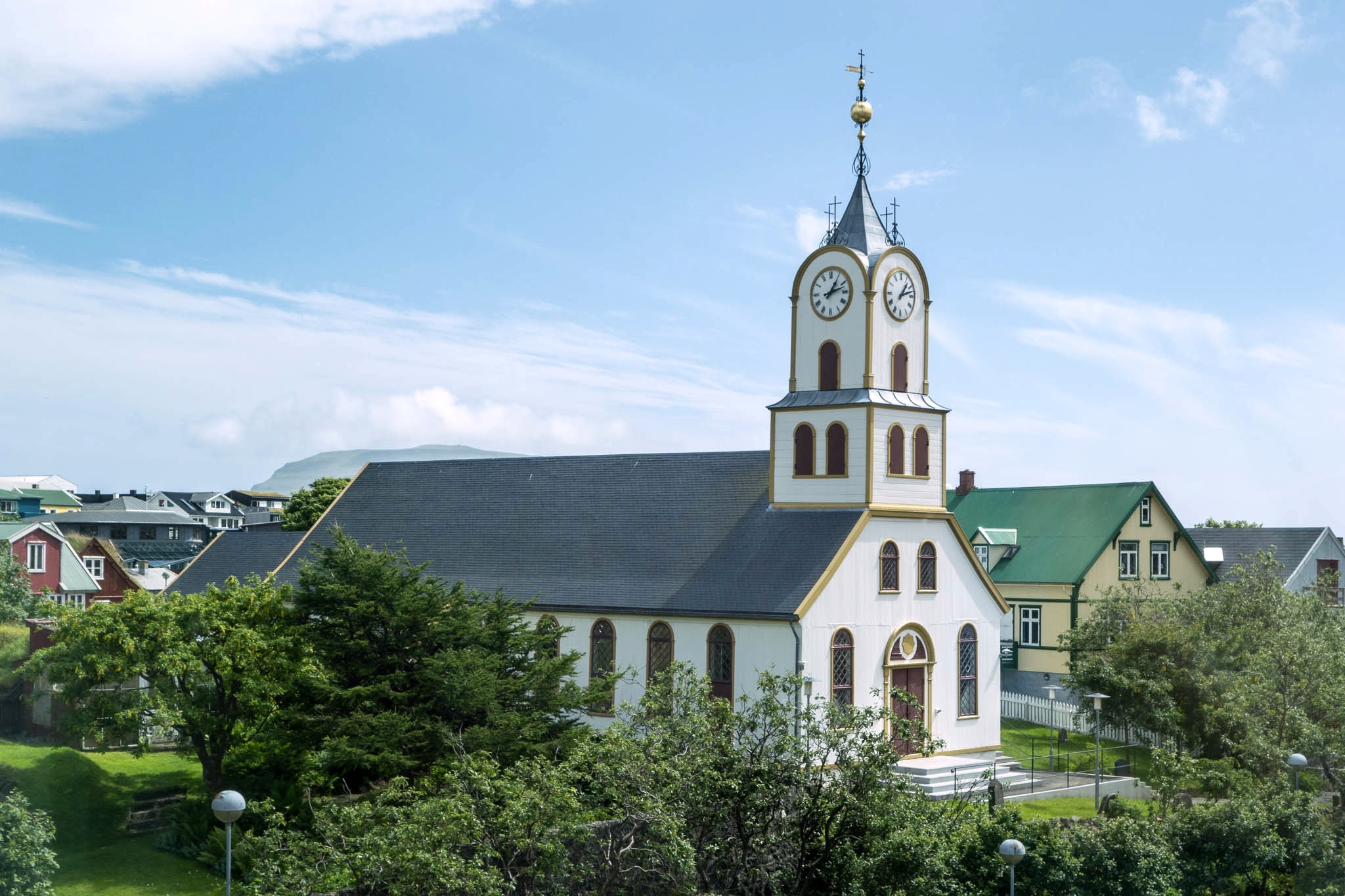
- Tórshavn Cathedral in 2014
- Tórshavn Cathedral
- 62°00′35″N 6°46′18″W
- Location: Tórshavn
- Country: Faroe Islands
- Denomination: Church of the Faroe Islands

History
- Status: Active
- Founded: 1609
- Consecrated: 17 December 1865

Architecture
- Functional status: Cathedral church

Clergy
- Bishop: Jógvan Fríðriksson
- Dean: Uni Næs

Tórshavn Cathedral (Faroese: Havnar Kirkja, or Dómkirkjan) is the second oldest received church of the Faroe Islands, on Tinganes in the old town of Tórshavn. Painted white, and roofed with slate, it was established in 1788. The cathedral lies in the north of the peninsula of Tinganes and is one of the main attractions of the town. Like most churches of the country it belongs to the Evangelical-Lutheran national Church of the Faroe Islands. Since 1990, it has been the seat of the Bishop of the Faroes and is therefore known as a cathedral.

== Early churches ==
The early history of the church is quite complicated. To all appearances there was no church in the strict sense in Tórshavn in the Middle Ages, only perhaps a "prayer house". It has been suggested that services were held in the Munkastovan in Tinganes. It was only in 1609, that a proper church, built on a stony hill, known as "úti á Reyni" was built on Tinganes, when King Christian IV directed the Lord Lieutenant at Bergenshus "to bestow upon the Faroese people some timber for the construction of their church..."

In 1780 Rasmus Jørgen Winther became minister in Tórshavn and in 1782 seized the initiative to build a new church. However it was only in 1788 that Johannes Poulsen, to the building master in Torshavn. The church of Christian IV was demolished in 1798 following the consecration of the new church, and the timber was sold at an auction. Part of the furniture was transferred to the new church. In 1788 the population of Torshavn numbered approx. 600 people and in 1865 approx. 900 people.

== The present church ==
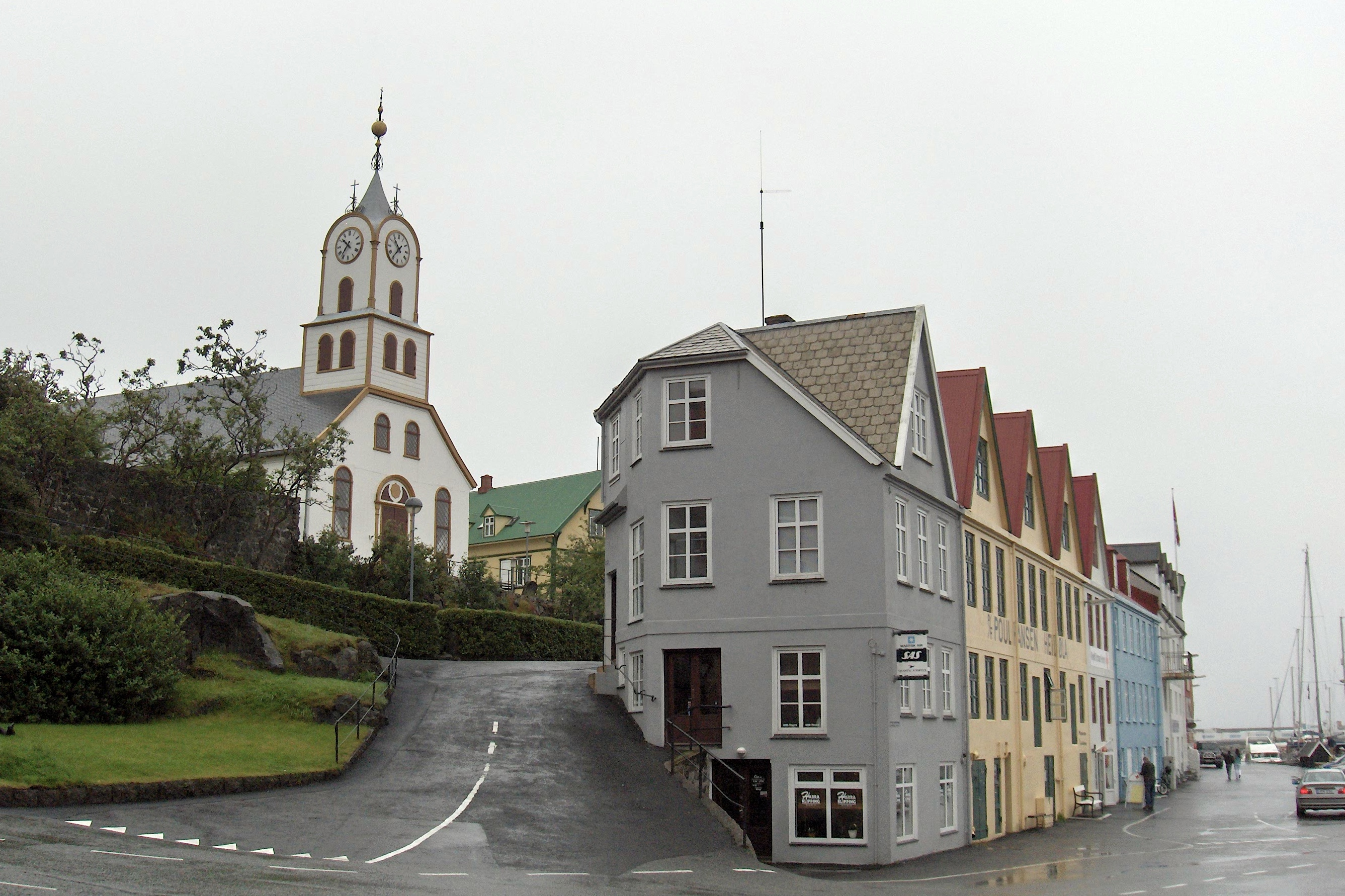
Cathedral and harbourside buildings

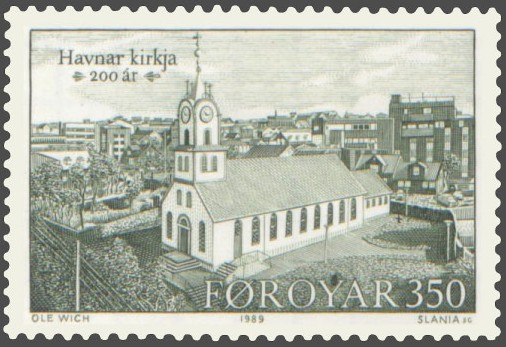
Faroese postage stamp showing the cathedral

Though it completely changed the appearance of the church, the rebuilding in 1865 seems in fact to have only marginally affected the structural parts of the 1788 church. The church has on the whole preserved its structure from 1865. In 1935, however, the choir was extended by four metres and a new sacristy was built. The choir was also extended with an office and other secondary rooms in 1968. The nave itself contains 44 benches, the gallery 14.

=== Altarpiece ===
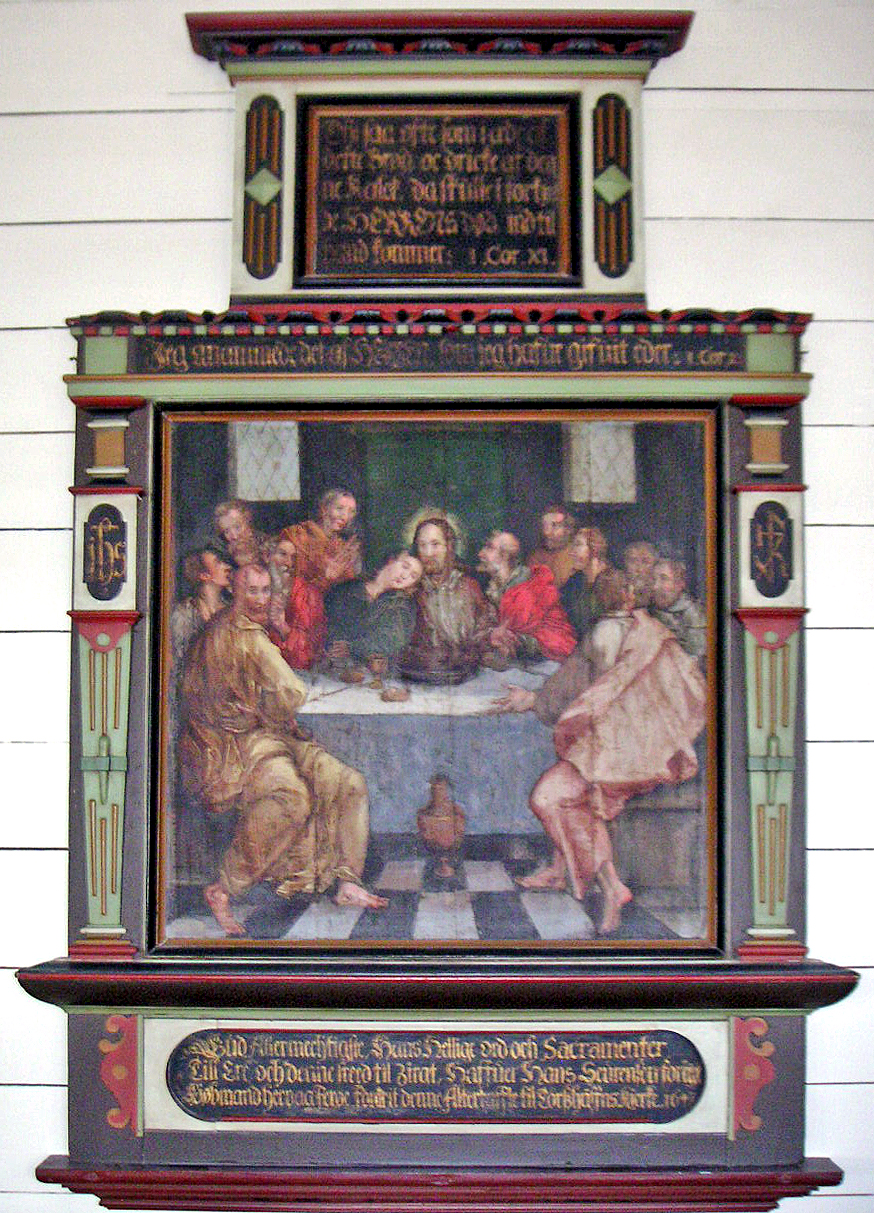
The altarpiece

The altarpiece from 1647 is fitted on the north wall of the nave, with a painting of the Last Supper and the words of institution. The inscription reads: Gud Allermechtigste Hans Hellige Ord och Sacramenter Till Ere och denne Steed til Zirat haffuer Hans Sevrensen fordum Kiøbmand her paa Ferøe foraerit denne Altertaffle til Torßhaffns Kiercke 1647. ('For the Glory of God Almighty's Words and Sacraments and to ornament this Place, Hans Sevrensen, former Merchant on the Faroes, bestowed this altarpiece on the Church of Torshavn in 1647'). It is a rather simple piece of work from the late Renaissance, with a central section flanked by degenerated pilasters, a pedestal section and a small top section.

The painting of the central section, the Last Supper, belongs to the large group of Danish 17th-century paintings derived from the painting of the Last Supper by Peter Candid – the Court painter to Wilhelm V – for the Franciscan house in Munich, and popularised through prints by Sandeler. It was restored in 1961 by Ernst and Holmer Trier together with the local painter Fraser Eysturoy. The painting measures 100 x 100 cm.

== The bell From Norske Löve ==
The bell is said to have been acquired in 1708. It originates from the Danish slave ship Norske Löve (Norwegian Lion), which went down in Lambavík on New Year's Eve, 1707.

The bell is decorated with palmettes and bears the inscription: "Danscke Ostindische Compagnies Scheb Nordische Löwe" (The Danish East India Company's ship Nordische Löwe, 1704), and the crowned monogram of the company. It is 30 cm tall, and the diameter of the outside rim is 41.5 cm.

== See also ==
- Magnus Cathedral
