= Kristian Osvald Viderø =

Faroese poet (1906–1991)

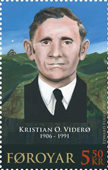
- Faroese stamps of 2007.
- Born: 27 May 1906; Skálavík, Faroe Islands
- Died: 8 April 1991 (aged 84); Copenhagen, Denmark

Kristian Osvald Viderø (27 May 1906 – 8 April 1991) was a Faroese clergyman, poet and Bible translator. In 1985 he won the Faroese Literature Prize for his works.

== Biography ==
Viderø was born in Skálavík. After theological studies in Denmark, he oversaw the completion of a translation of the Old Testament into the Faroese language, which Jákup Dahl had worked on until his death in 1944. He was the parish priest of Hattarvík from 1965 to 1969. He died in Copenhagen. Viderø was commemorated on a Faroese postage stamp in a series on Faroese Bible translators in June 2007.

== Bibliography ==
- Ferð mín til Jorsala. Tórshavn: E. Thomsen, 1984.
- Á Suðurlandið. Tórshavn: E. Thomsen, 1990.
- Ferð mín til Jorsala á himni. Tórshavn:: E. Thomsen, 1990.
- Á annað Suðurlandið: ferð mín til Jorsala Oman av himni. Tórshavn: E. Thomsen, 1990.
- Frá landi á fyrsta sinni. Tórshavn: E. Thomsen, 1991.
- Saga Skálavíkar, Húsavíkar, Skarvanesar, Dals, Skúoyar, Dímunar, Sands, Skopunar, Hestoyar, Kolturs Tórshavn: E. Thomsen, 1991.
- Saga Suðuroyar. Tórshavn: Bókagarður, 1994.
- Saga Vágoyar og Mykiness. Tórshavn: Bókagarður, 1994.
- Saga Eysturoyar. Tórshavn: Bókagarður, 1994.
- Ferð mín til Damaskusar. Tórshavn: Bókagarður, 1997.

== See also ==
- List of Faroese people
