= Viðareiði =

Viðareiði Viderejde (Danish)
- Municipality and village
- Viðareiði Municipality; Viðareiðis kommuna (Faroese)
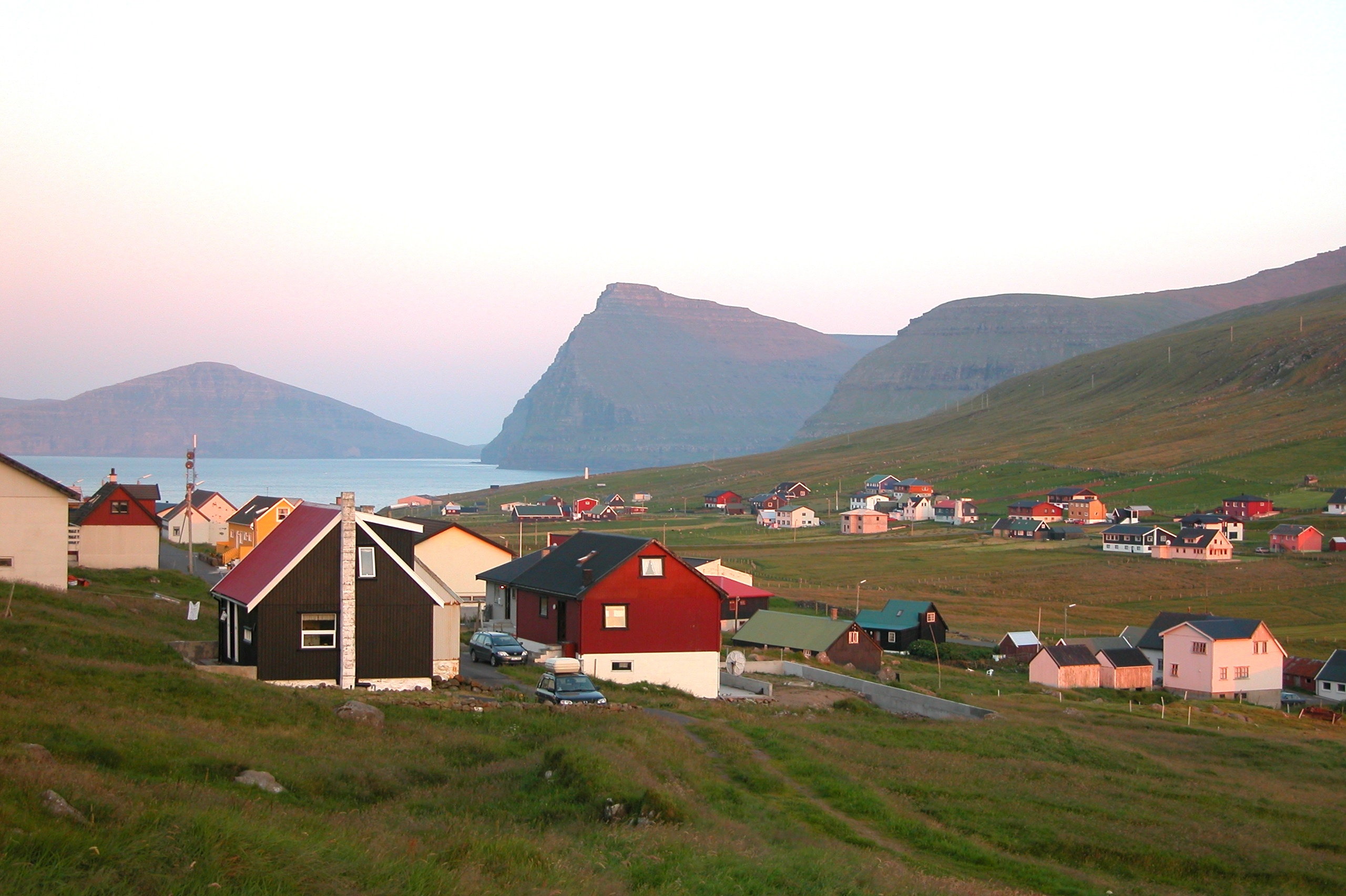

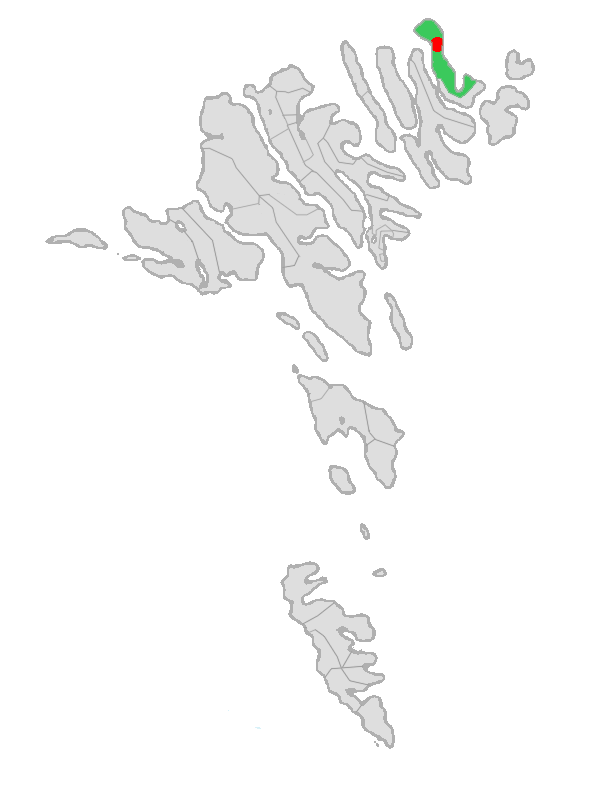
- Location of Viðareiði Municipality in the Faroe Islands

- Location in the Faroe Islands
- Coordinates: 62°21′35″N 6°31′58″W
- State: Kingdom of Denmark
- Constituent country: Faroe Islands
- Island: Viðoy

Population (September 2025)
  - Total: 326
- Time zone: GMT
  - Summer (DST): UTC+1 (WEST)
- Postal code: FO 750
- Climate: Cfc

Viðareiði ([ˈviːjaɹaijɪ], literally: Wood-Isthmus, Danish: Viderejde) is the northernmost settlement in the Faroe Islands and lies on the Island of Viðoy, which belongs to the Norðoyar Region.

== Geography ==
It lies on an isthmus with high mountains to both the north and south.

The community is linked overland by a causeway and tunnel system to the regional centre of Klaksvík to the south on Borðoy. The road to Viðareiði goes along the west coast of Viðoy, through the town, and then along the island's east coast to the uninhabited Miðdalur Valley with its typical small waterfall.

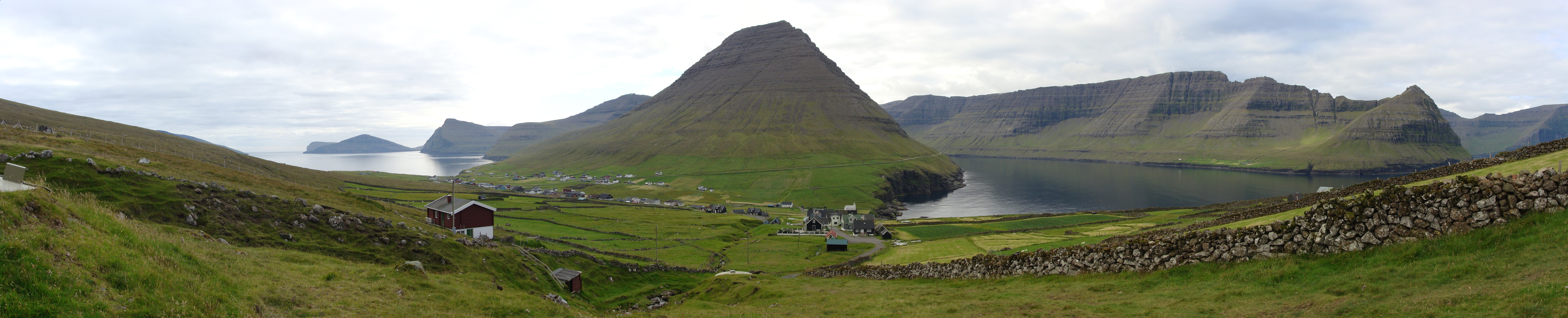
Panorama of Viðareiði

To the north, Mount Villingdalsfjall rises over 844 meters (2,769 ft) from the water. It is the highest mountain in the North Islands and the third-largest in the entire Faroese archipelago. The north coast is marked by Cape Enniberg, the second-highest sea cliff in Europe at 754 meters (2,474 ft) and the highest promontory in the world. Looking to the west from Viðareiði, one has a view of the mighty northern peaks on Borðoy and Kunoy. Turning around, one can see through the crag and tails of the isthmus to the eastern Island of Fugloy. Finally, to the south of the town, the 751 meters (2,464 ft) high cone-shaped mountain of Malinsfjall can be seen during good weather. Viðareiði is a departure point for a vast area of hiking. In the community, there is not only a small grocery store, but also the Hotel Norð with its restaurant that serves traditional cuisine.

== History ==
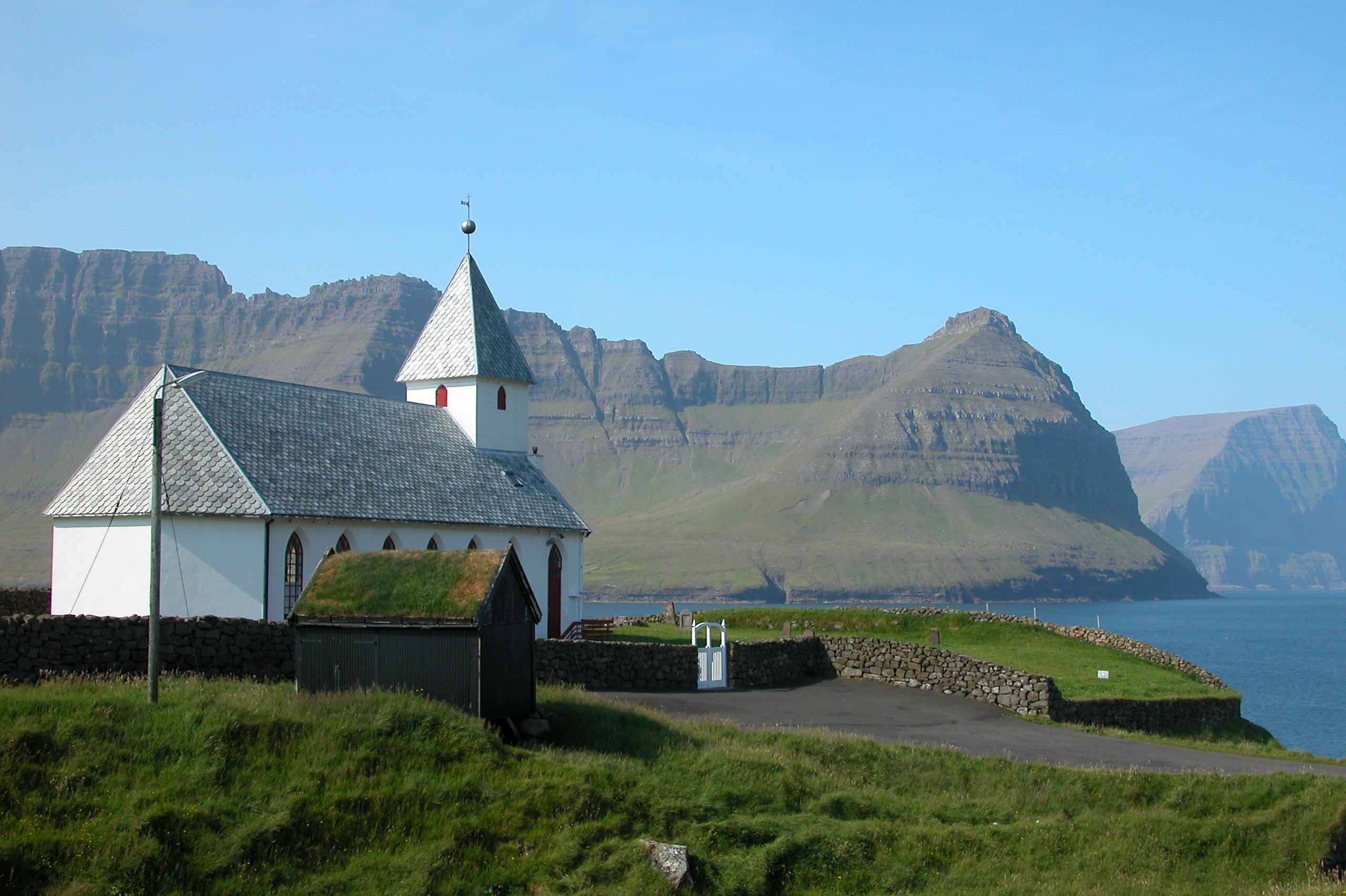
Viðareiði Church

In the 17th century, the old church was destroyed in a storm. It is said that a part of the cemetery was washed away by the sea and that coffins from the cemetery were recovered in Hvannasund and reburied in Viðareiði.

The current church was built in 1892. The church silver is a gift from the British government, thanking Viðareiði's citizens for the rescue of the brig Marwood, which was shipwrecked near Viðareiði during a winter storm in 1847.

== Transportation ==
Strandfaraskip Landsins route 500 buses connect the village with Klaksvík several times daily, from where onward connections are available.

== See also ==
- List of towns in the Faroe Islands
