= Jens Pauli Skaalum =

Faroese politician (1893–1978)

Jens Pauli Skaalum (December 18, 1893 – August 1, 1978) was a Faroese teacher and a politician for the Union Party.

== Early life and works ==
Skaalum was born in Hvalba, the son of the teacher and politician Óli Niklái Skaalum and Elsebeth Helena Niclasen. He graduated from the Jonstrup Normal School (Danish: Jonstrup Seminarium) in Copenhagen as a primary school teacher in 1914, and then taught in Porkeri from 1914 to 1920 and in Hvalba from 1920 to 1960. He was married to Astrid Larsen from Porkeri.

Skaalum was a deputy representative to the Faroese Parliament from Suðuroy, and he stood in for Oliver Effersøe, who took a leave of absence for health reasons from 1931 to 1932. Skaalum was a member of the Hvalba municipal council from 1939 to 1950 and served as mayor from 1939 to 1948. He used to be a member of the supervisory committee of the bank Føroya Sparikassi from 1957 to 1976.
