= Óli Niklái Skaalum =

Faroese politician

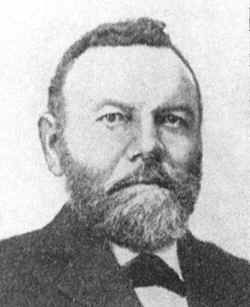
- Born: April 29, 1849; Hvalba, Faroe Islands
- Died: January 29, 1924 (aged 74)
- Occupations: Teacher, politician
- Title: Mayor of Hvalba
- Term: 1888–1915
- Political party: Union Party (Faroe Islands)

Óli Niklái Skaalum (April 29, 1849 – January 29, 1924) was a Faroese teacher and a politician for the Union Party.

Skaalum was born in Hvalba. He received his teaching degree in 1872, after which he taught in Sandvík until 1909 and in Hvalba until 1920. He was a member of the Hvalba municipal council from 1875 to 1915 and served as mayor from 1888 to 1915. Skaalum was one of the founders of the Union Party, and he served in the Faroese Parliament as the party's representative for Suðuroy from 1906 to 1916.

Skaalum married Elsebeth Helena Niclasen, and they were the parents of the teacher and politician Jens Pauli Skaalum.
