= Kirkja =

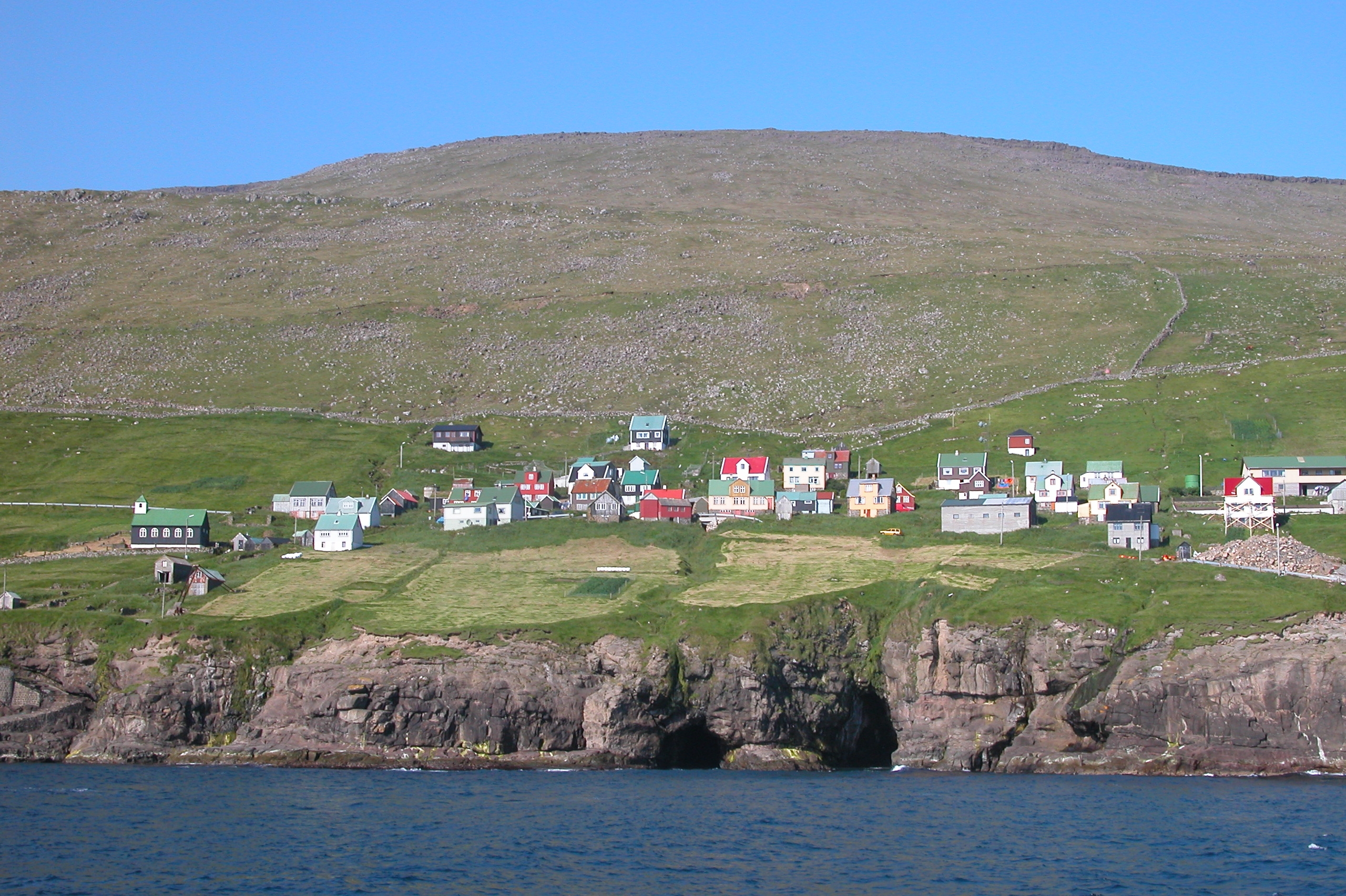
- Kirkja on Fugloy

- Location within Denmark Faroe Islands
- Coordinates: 62°19′10″N 6°18′51″W
- State: Kingdom of Denmark
- Constituent country: Faroe Islands
- Island: Fugloy
- Municipality: Fugloyar kommuna

Population (29 April 2025)
  - Total: 30
- Time zone: GMT
  - Summer (DST): UTC+1 (EST)
- Postal code: FO 766
- Climate: Cfc

Kirkja (Danish: Kirke) is a village on the island of Fugloy, Faroe Islands. It is located on the south-tip of the island, and its land is stretching all over the western side of the island, including a small enclave in the now uninhabited Skarðsvík. Here archaeologists have located an old settlement that has probably been only a part-time settlement used either by people from Kirkja or Hattarvík.

== Transportation ==
Kirkja is one of two villages on the island of Fugloy that are connected both by the road built in the 1980s and by the ferry that connects both Kirkja and Hattarvík to Hvannasund on the larger island of Viðoy, and in the last two decades the island can also be reached by helicopter either from the national airport in Vágar, the national capital of Tórshavn or the regional capital Klaksvík.

Kirkja means church and Fugloy means bird-island in Faroese. From here there is a view over the sound Fugloyarfjørður towards the capes of Svínoy and also towards the northernmost cape of the Faroes, Enniberg on Viðoy – one of the highest cliffs in the world – and the rounded isthmus of Viðareiði that has been a favorite motif for Faeroese and foreign painters throughout the past century because of its sunset. Kirkja thereby offers panoramas in the Faroes, making it a tourist attraction.

== Climate ==
Climate data for Kirkja, Fugloy, 53 m.a.s.l.
Month	Jan	Feb	Mar	Apr	May	Jun	Jul	Aug	Sep	Oct	Nov	Dec	Year
Record high °C (°F)	13.4 (56.1)	12.0 (53.6)	13.0 (55.4)	14.9 (58.8)	19.8 (67.6)	20.0 (68.0)	21.3 (70.3)	20.8 (69.4)	20.6 (69.1)	18.8 (65.8)	13.0 (55.4)	14.5 (58.1)	21.3 (70.3)
Mean daily maximum °C (°F)	6.7 (44.1)	5.8 (42.4)	6.5 (43.7)	7.2 (45.0)	9.2 (48.6)	11.2 (52.2)	12.8 (55.0)	13.4 (56.1)	11.8 (53.2)	9.5 (49.1)	7.5 (45.5)	6.6 (43.9)	9.0 (48.2)
Daily mean °C (°F)	4.6 (40.3)	3.7 (38.7)	4.3 (39.7)	5.2 (41.4)	7.0 (44.6)	9.0 (48.2)	10.6 (51.1)	11.2 (52.2)	9.7 (49.5)	7.5 (45.5)	5.8 (42.4)	4.4 (39.9)	6.9 (44.4)
Mean daily minimum °C (°F)	2.4 (36.3)	1.5 (34.7)	1.8 (35.2)	2.9 (37.2)	4.9 (40.8)	7.0 (44.6)	8.8 (47.8)	9.3 (48.7)	7.7 (45.9)	5.5 (41.9)	3.8 (38.8)	2.2 (36.0)	4.8 (40.6)
Record low °C (°F)	−6.2 (20.8)	−5.5 (22.1)	−9.1 (15.6)	−4.2 (24.4)	−2.4 (27.7)	1.5 (34.7)	4.1 (39.4)	4.9 (40.8)	0.9 (33.6)	−2.0 (28.4)	−3.2 (26.2)	−6.2 (20.8)	−9.1 (15.6)
Average precipitation mm (inches)	94 (3.7)	87 (3.4)	94 (3.7)	84 (3.3)	67 (2.6)	66 (2.6)	80 (3.1)	83 (3.3)	85 (3.3)	111 (4.4)	97 (3.8)	93 (3.7)	1,040 (40.9)
Average precipitation days (≥ 1.0 mm)	18	17	18	12	13	9.8	9.7	13	15	17	18	15	175
Source: Danish Meteorological Institute

== See also ==
- List of towns in the Faroe Islands
