= Hattarvík =

- Village
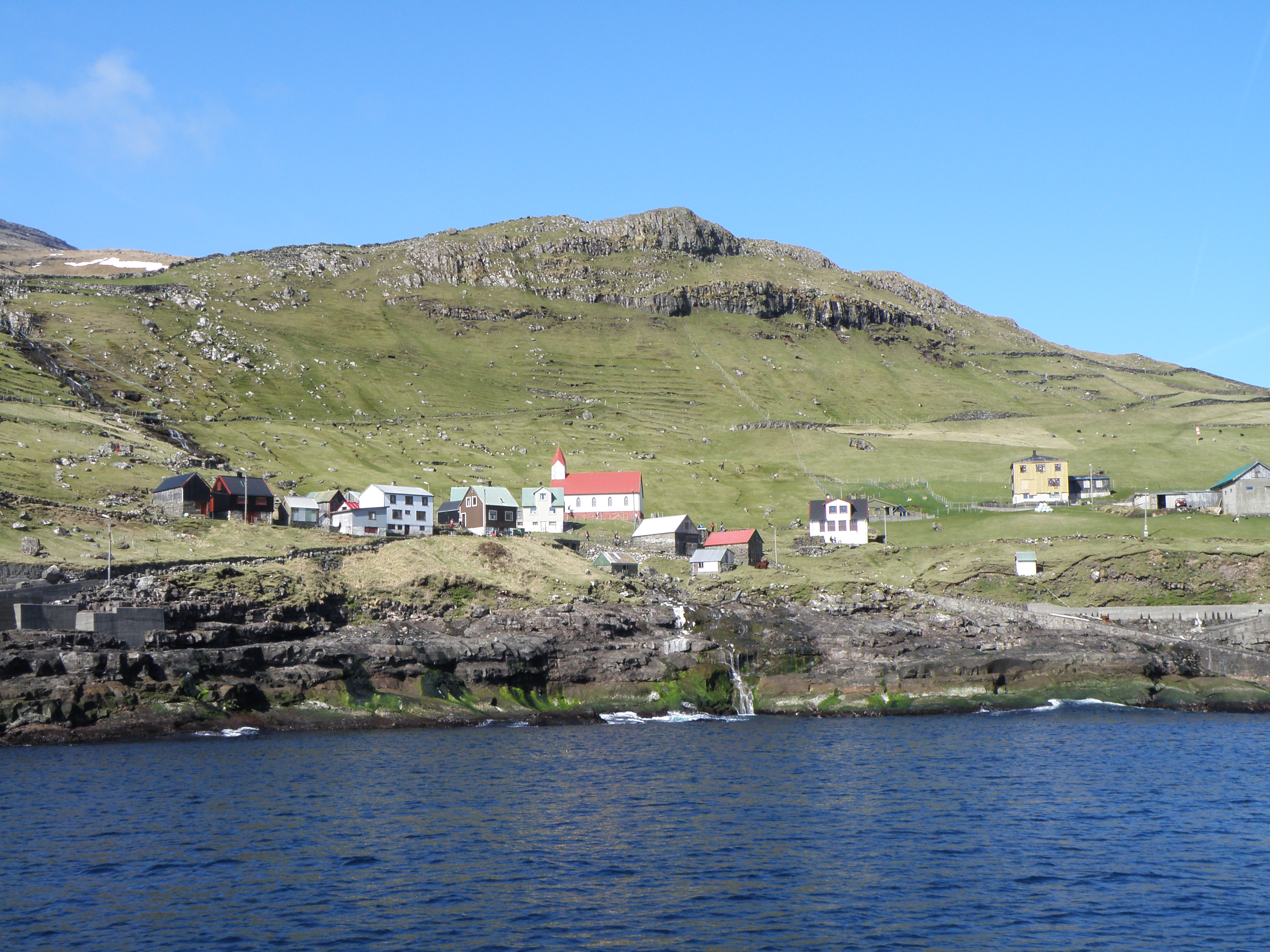
- Hattarvík

- Location of Hattarvík in the out-most north-east of the Faroe Islands
- Coordinates: 62°19′51″N 6°16′25″W
- State: Kingdom of Denmark
- Constituent country: Faroe Islands
- Island: Fugloy
- Municipality: Fugloyar kommuna

Population (29 April 2025)
  - Total: 18
- Time zone: GMT
  - Summer (DST): UTC+1 (EST)
- Postal code: FO 767
- Climate: Cfc

Hattarvík (Danish: Hattervig) is a small village on the east side of the island of Fugloy, Faroe Islands, and is the easternmost settlement in the Faroes archipelago.

The village is encircled by high mountains on three sides.

== History ==
Hattarvik was founded in 900. The stone church was built in 1899. Some old stone houses are currently being restored. These houses are said to relate to the Flokksmenn. These were three strong men who wanted to seize power in the Faroe Islands in the 15th century.

== Transportation ==
Hattarvik is reachable by a ferry once or twice a day from Hvannasund and also by a helicopter three times a week from Klaksvík and Tórshavn. A road leads to the other village on Fugloy, Kirkja in the south.

== See also ==
- List of towns in the Faroe Islands
