= Fugloy =

Fugloy Fuglø (Danish)
- Island
- Fugloy Municipality; Fugloyar kommuna (Faroese)
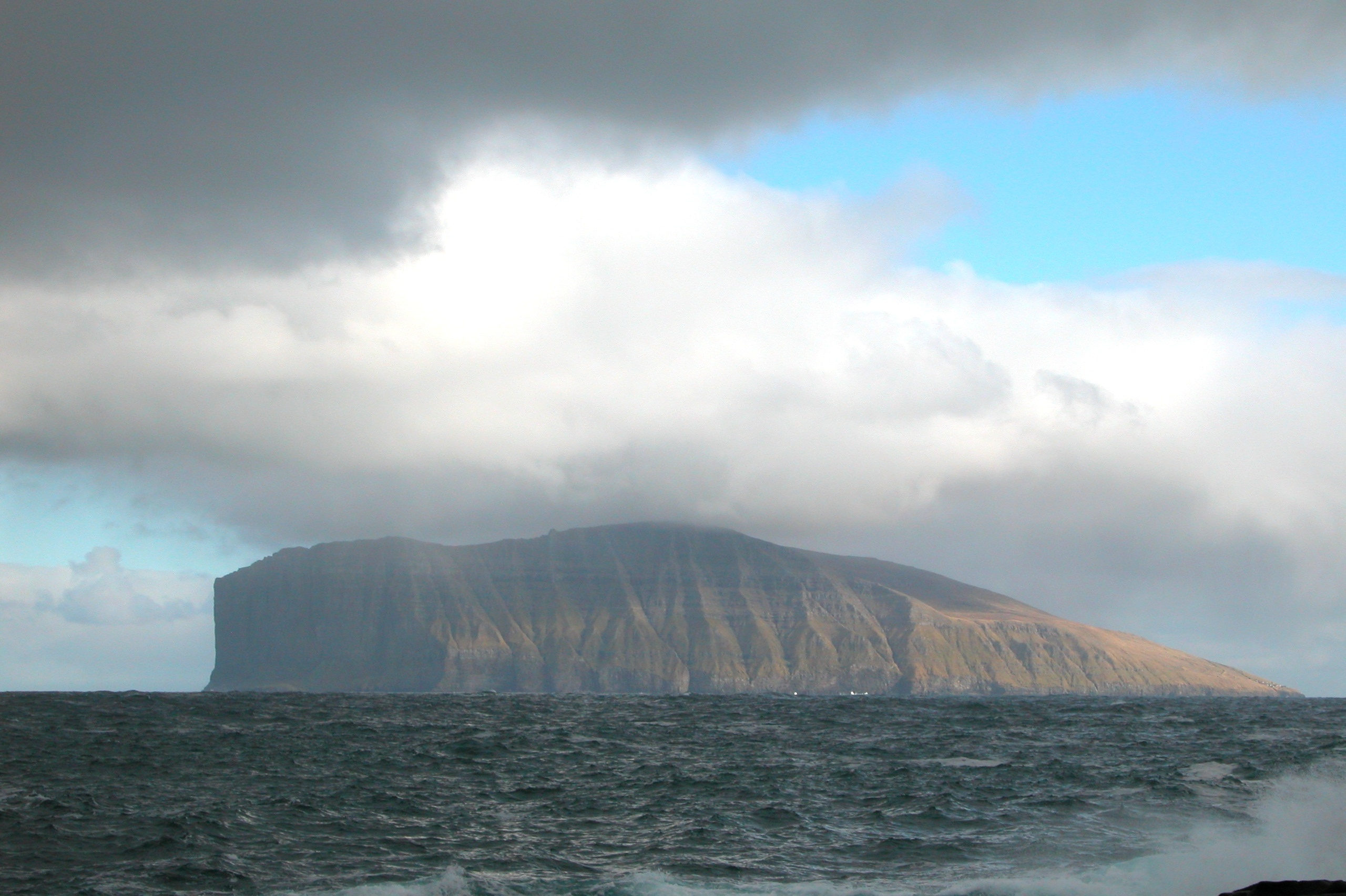
- Fugloy

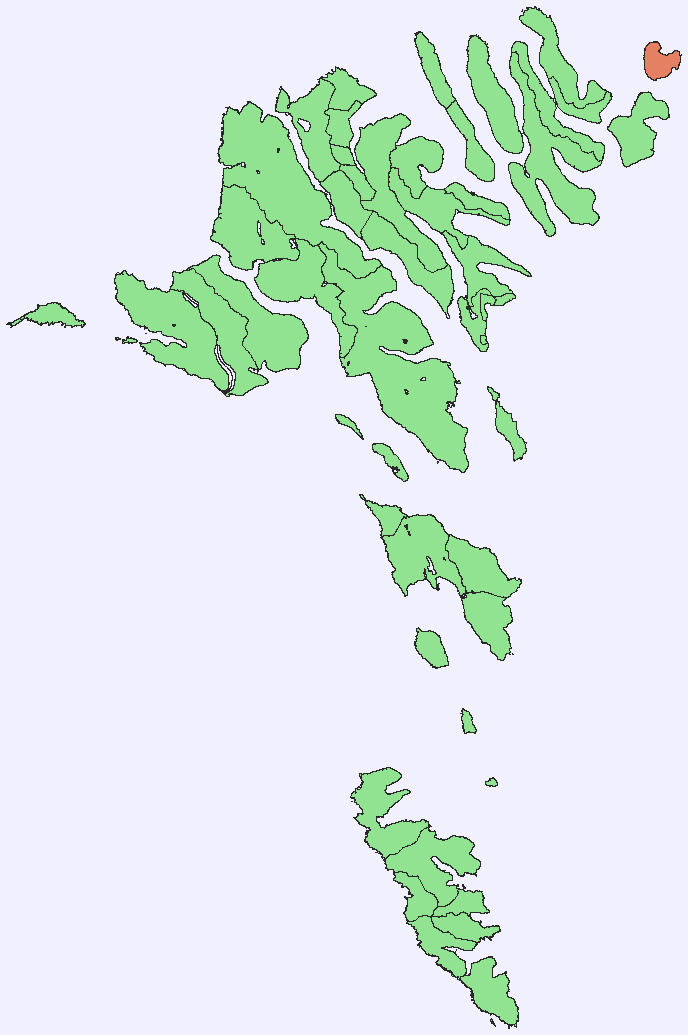
- Location within the Faroe Islands
- Coordinates: 62°20′N 6°18′W
- State: Kingdom of Denmark
- Constituent country: Faroe Islands
- Municipality seat: Fugloyar

Area
  - Total: 11.2 km^{2} (4.3 sq mi)
  - Rank: 11
- Highest elevation: 620 m (2,030 ft)

Population (2020)
  - Total: 38
  - Rank: 13
  - Density: 3.4/km^{2} (8.8/sq mi)
- Time zone: UTC+0 (GMT)
  - Summer (DST): UTC+1 (WEST)
- Calling code: 298
- Website: http://www.fugloy.fo/

Fugloy (pronounced [ˈfʊglɪ], Danish: Fuglø, Old Norse: Fuglaey) is the easternmost island in the Faroe Islands.

The name means bird island, and refers to the large number of birds that nest on the island's cliffs.

== Geography ==
There are two settlements:

- Kirkja on the south-coast and
- Hattarvík on the east-coast.

Fugloy is special because of the stone-material consisting of basalt stratum, making the island very steep and inaccessible. The Eystfelli cliffs, which are 448m are located on the east coast. Nearby on the 47-metre-high sea stack Stapin there is also a lighthouse, a natural arch feature and what looks like the outline of an Egyptian Pharaoh (the Pharaoh's Face).

=== Mountains ===
There are three mountains on Fugloy:

| Name | Height |
|---|---|
| Klubbin | 621 m |
| Eystfelli | 449 m |

== Flora and fauna ==
=== Important Bird Area ===
The island has been identified as an Important Bird Area by BirdLife International because of its significance as a breeding site for seabirds, especially Atlantic puffins (15,000 pairs), European storm petrels (25,000 pairs) and black guillemots (100 pairs), as well as for about 50 breeding pairs of Eurasian whimbrels.

Fugloy was also a nesting site for the now extinct great auk (garefowl). On the east side of the island there is a rock ledge called Gorfuglarókin "Garefowl Ledge", and written sources confirm that great auks were still breeding on Fugloy in the 18th century.

=== Mammals ===
Grey seals are regular visitors to the coastlines of Fugloy. Mountain hares were introduced by humans, and inhabit the higher altitudes on the island. Fugloy has its own subspecies of house mouse Mus musculus domesticus, as do some of the other Faroese islands.

=== Flora ===
In contrast to the other Norðoyar islands, Fugloy is green and fertile all the way up to the mountain tops. Some rare plants are found on the island, e.g. the Fugloy Eyebright Euphrasia foulaensis.

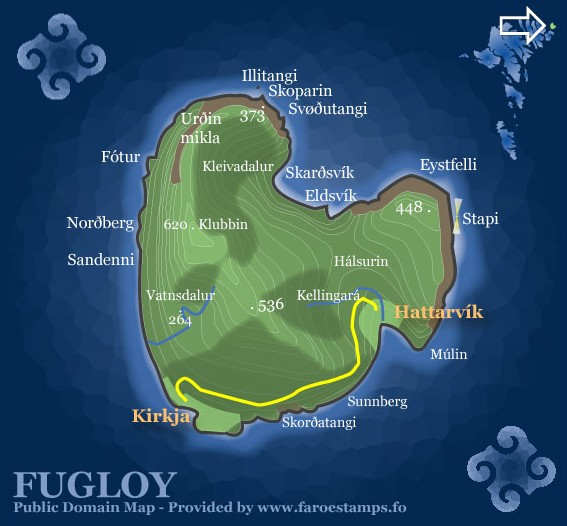

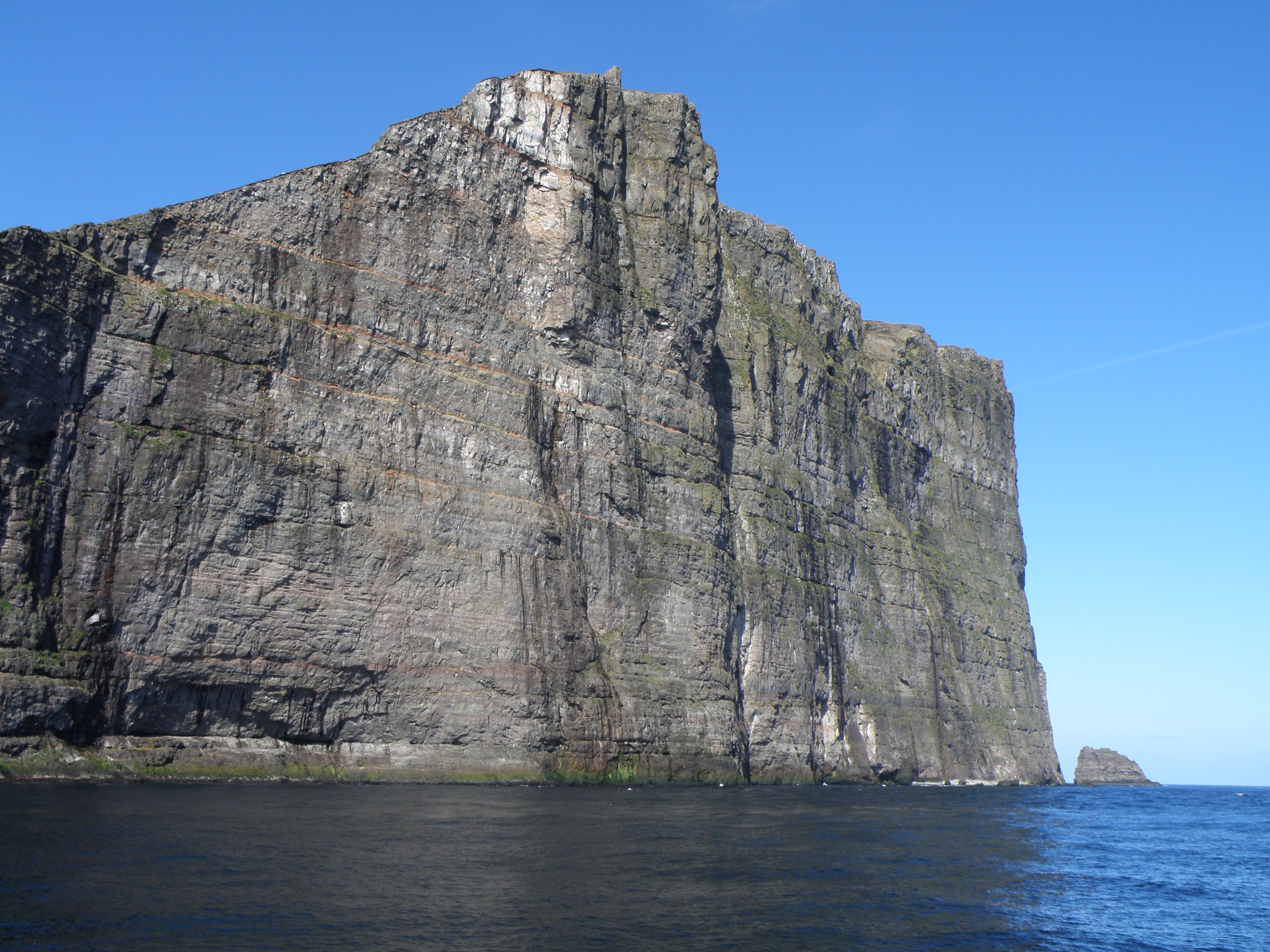
Eystfelli and Stapin

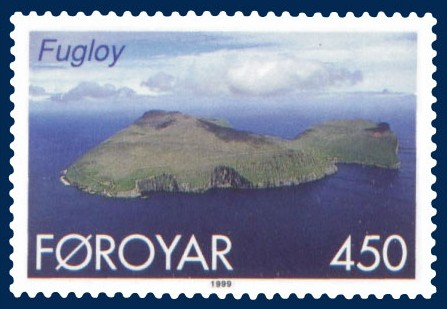
Fugloy on Faroese stamp issued 1999

== History ==
The island has been populated since the Viking Age. One of the most important stories of the island is that of the Floksmenn. They were a flock (group) of rebels, in the Middle Ages, from Fugloy. The most notorious of the separatists, (referred by the Danish governmental officials in Tórshavn) were Høgni Nev, Rógvi Skel, Hálvdan Úlvsson and Sjúrður við Kellingará from Hattarvík. These men controlled and ravaged the northern parts of the Faroe Islands for a long time. This is one of the most important separatist myths of the Faroe Islands.

The smarter Sjúrður við Kellingará was forced to go the more militant way of rebellion by Høgni Nev and Hálvdan Ulvsson who were more criminally minded. All the four men were later caught and sentenced to death. Sjúrður við kellingar was shown mercy and amnesty, but the story goes that he could not live with the crimes that he and the others had committed under their "little" rebellion and asked to be executed with the other Floksmenn.

Because the harbour of Fugloy is not protected by breakwaters, it has stopped any form of economic growth since the early 20th century. The island's only income has been agriculture and some fishing, but also the famous catching of birds such as the puffin has been used on Fugloy to this day.

The Faroese parliament has tried to work out plans for the future of the island, such as the island getting electricity in the 1960s. In the 1980s a road from Kirkja to Hattarvík was built and a helicopter route to the island was established as well.

When the population was at its peak at the beginning of the 20th century, there were around 250–300 people living there. Due to a change in lifestyles and norms, island life has become less popular and people have moved away as a result. Today, there are only five people living all year around in Hattarvík and some 20 in Kirkja. There are few jobs on the islands; one shop and few jobs on the harbour are all that there are.

=== Másin the mail boat ===
Until taken out of service in 2010, the 1950s mail boat Másin was used as transit to Fugloy, making a popular attraction in itself. A newer boat is now used as a replacement but at Kirkja, passengers still have just a few minutes to jump ashore and get bags and their things with them. Oil for the electricity plant on Fugloy is transported in oil barrels and garbage is transported by the same boat and must be landed at the same time.

=== Tourism ===
The name Fugloy comes from the Faroese word fuglur for "bird" so it is not surprising that the island has a rich fauna of sea and land birds, especially puffins (Faroese: lundi) which inhabit the island in thousands. The view over to the nearest islands Svínoy and Borðoy is excellent, and sunsets that can be seen are among the things that make Fugloy feature in old pictures of the Faroe Islands.

== Mythology ==
There are several myths connected to this island. In old Faroese Culture trolls played a large part in the mythology of the Faroe Islands:

The Floating Island of Fugloy

It was said that Fugloy was once a floating island with trolls living on it. Men had tried several times to approach the island, but every time they tried, the trolls threw stones and curses at the men in the boats. After a long time the men grew tired of trying and were close to leaving the trolls with the island. But one of the men, a priest, wanted to try one more time, before giving up. The men got in the boats again and rowed once more to Fugloy. In the first boat to approach the island were the priest and some other men. When the trolls saw what was happening, they started to collect stones, and began throwing them at the men. All the men in the first boat were scared and wanted to sail home again at once, with the big stones flying through the air! They were about to turn round and sail home, when the priest got so angry and was in such great despair that he threw the Bible that he had brought with him on the trip at the trolls. The Bible landed right in front of the trolls, the ground started shaking, the island stopped floating, and in a split second all the trolls were transformed into little grassy hills, and now the men could at last settle Fugloy. The little grassy hills are still located around the island, and particularly, close to the Bygd (Kirkja).
