= List of lakes of the Faroe Islands =

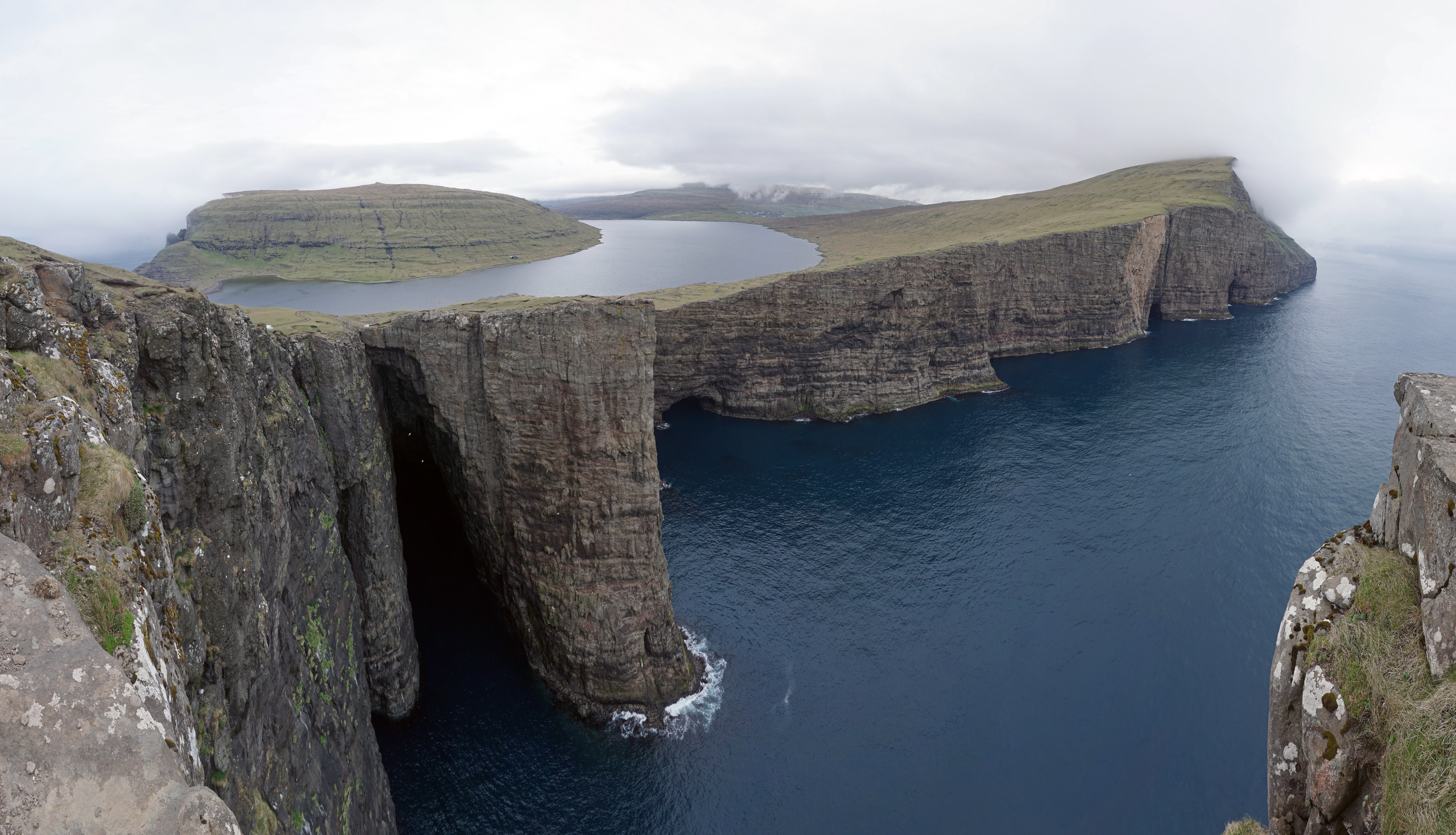
Leitisvatn or Sørvágsvatn is the largest lake in the Faroe Islands.

The most important lakes in the Faroe Islands are Sørvágsvatn on Vágar, Fjallavatn also on Vágar, Sandsvatn on Sandoy, Lake Eiði on Eysturoy and Lake Toftir on Eysturoy. There are many other smaller lakes across the whole country, most of them used for leisure fishing. Some of the lakes are also used for electricity production, and especially Lake Eiði near Eiði and the water systems around Vestmanna are important in this context. Also in Strond on Borðoy and at Botnur in Suðuroy there are important power-plants.

== The 10 largest lakes in the Faroe Islands (natural sizes) ==
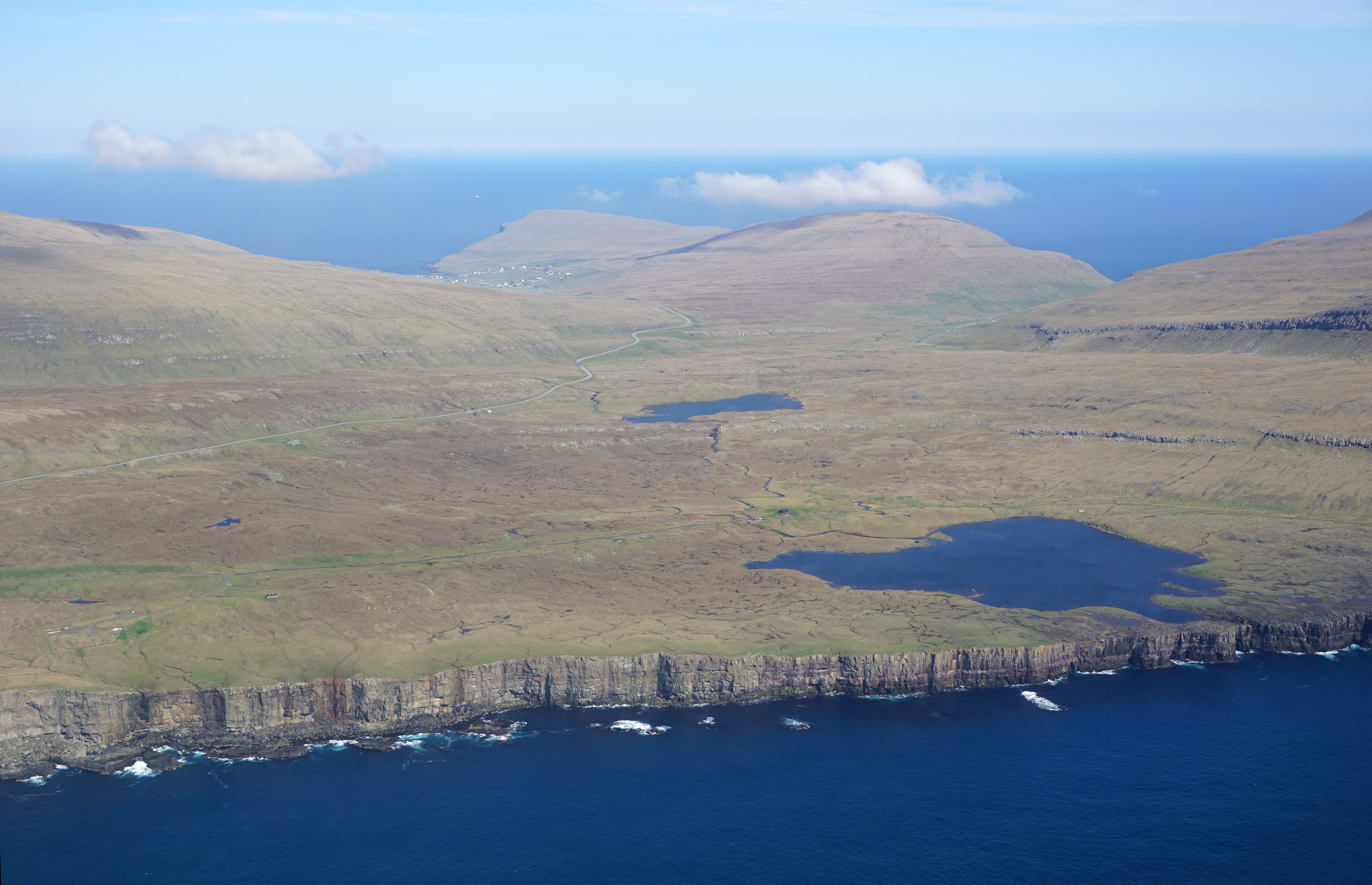
Stóravatn and Litlavatn, Sandoy.

1. Leitisvatn/Sørvágsvatn, Vágar, 3.57 km^{2} (This lake has two names)
2. Fjallavatn, Vágar, 1.03 km^{2}
3. Sandsvatn, Sandoy, 0.82 km^{2}
4. Lake Toftir (Toftavatn), Eysturoy, 0.51 km^{2}
5. Lake Eiði (Eiðisvatn), Eysturoy, 0.47 km^{2} (0.47 is the natural size of the lake before SEV made a dam there for their hydro-power plant; now the lake is 1.14)
6. Lake Leynar (Leynavatn), Streymoy, 0.18 km^{2}
7. Kirkjuvatn, Suðuroy, 0.17 km^{2}
8. Stóravatn, Sandoy 0.15 km^{2}
9. Vatnsnes, Suðuroy, 0.15 km^{2}
10. Gróthúsvatn, Sandoy, 0.14 km^{2}

== List of lakes in the Faroe Islands ==
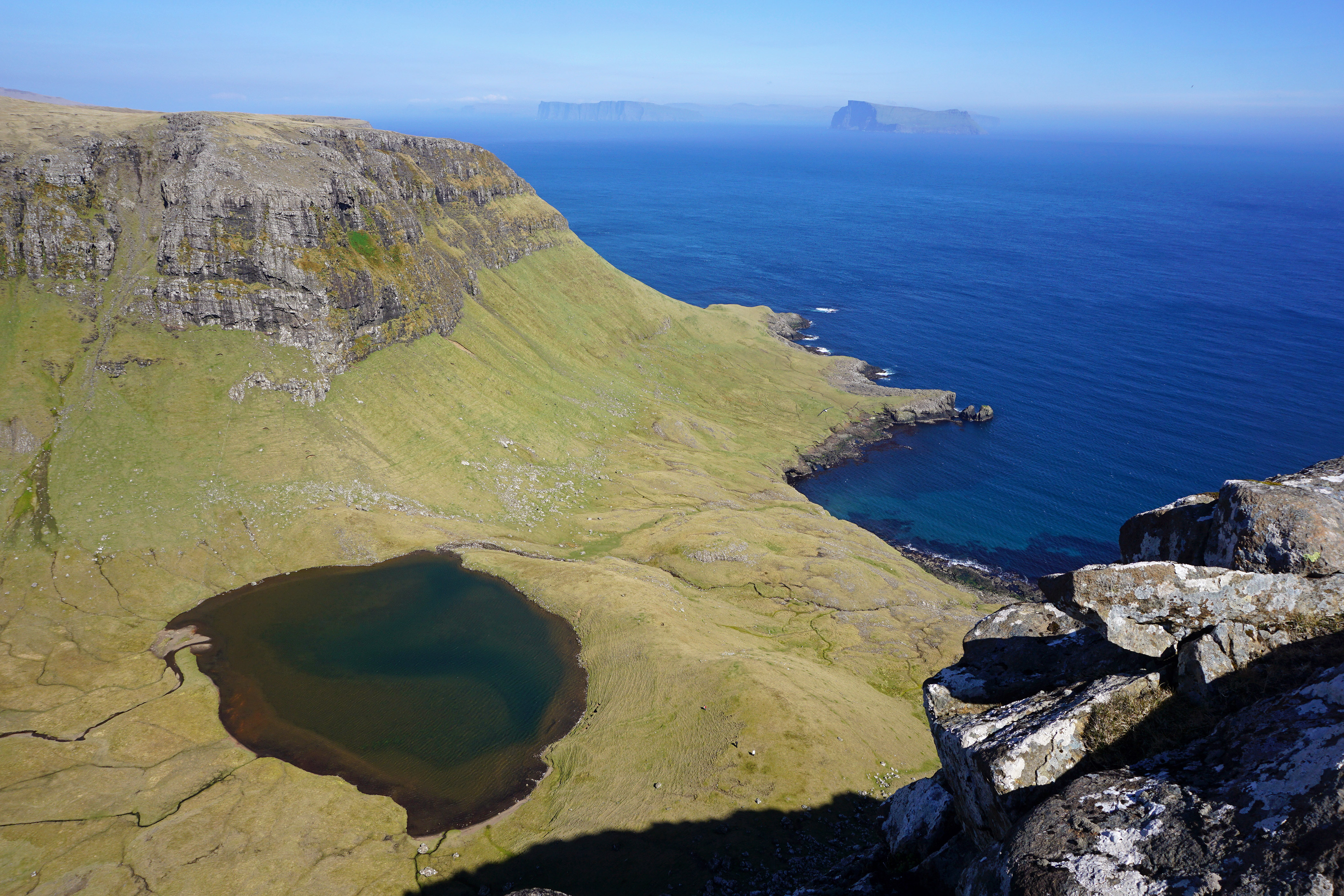
Hvannhagi, Suðuroy.

Lakes referred to on the islands of Suðuroy, Sandoy, Vágoy, Nólsoy, Eysturoy, Streymoy and Hestur:

- Pollur in Saksun
- Saksunarvatn
- Sandsvatn on Sandoy, 0.82 km^{2}
- Norðbergsvatn, between Hvalba and Norðbergseiði in Suðuroy
- Heygsvatn, between Hvalbiareiði and Hvalba in Suðuroy
- Vatnið í Hvannhaga (The Lake in Hvannhagi) in Suðuroy
- Vágsvatn in Suðuroy.
- Hamravatn
- Rættarvatn
- Bláfossvatn
- Nykarvatn, near Øravík in Suðuroy
- Mjáuvøtn
- Hviltavatn
- Kirkjuvatn near Fámjin in Suðuroy, 0.17 km^{2}
- Vatnið við Vágseiði (Lake near Vágseiði)
- Tindarlíðarvatn in Suðuroy
- Miðvatn in Suðuroy
- Ryskivatn in Suðuroy
- Bessavatn
- Lakes of Hovsdalur, Suðuroy
- Lakes of Hamrahagi
- Gróthúsvatn, Sandoy, 0.14 km^{2}
- Stóravatn
- Lítlavatn
- Norðara Hálsavatn
- Heimara Hálsavatn
- Vatndalsvatn
- Lómatjørn
- Lykkjuvøtn
- Fossavatn
- Múlbergsvatn
- Núpsvatn
- Ørguvatn
- Dunjavatn
- Hólmavatn
- Gásdalsvatn on Sandoy
- Stóratjørn
- Sørvágsvatn (also called Leitisvatn) in Vágar, 3.57 km^{2}
- Fjallavatn in Vágar, 1.03 km^{2}
- Hviltkinnavatn
- Breiðavatn
- Álkuðarvatn
- Halavatn
- Reyðastígavatn
- Steinavatn
- Lake Toftir, Eysturoy, 0.51 km^{2}
- Lake Eiði, Eysturoy, 0.47 km^{2}
- Mølinvatn
- Kornvatn
- Starvatn
- Vørðuvatn
- Kvíandalsvatn, Eysturoy
- Trælavatn, Eysturoy
- Heiðavatn
- Lake Leynar in Streymoy, 0,18 km^{2}
- Saksunarvatn in Streymoy
- Pollur í Saksun
- Mýrarnar
- Mjáuvøtn
- Vatnið
- Stóravatn
- Gásafjallavatn
- Brúnavatn
- Gásavatn in Streymoy
- Áarstíggjavatn
- Porkerisvatn in Streymoy
- Fagradalsvatn in Hestur
- Hálsvatn in Hestur
