= Hvalbiareiði =

Harbor on the west coast of Suðuroy, Faroe Islands

Coordinates: 61.591°N 6.964°W

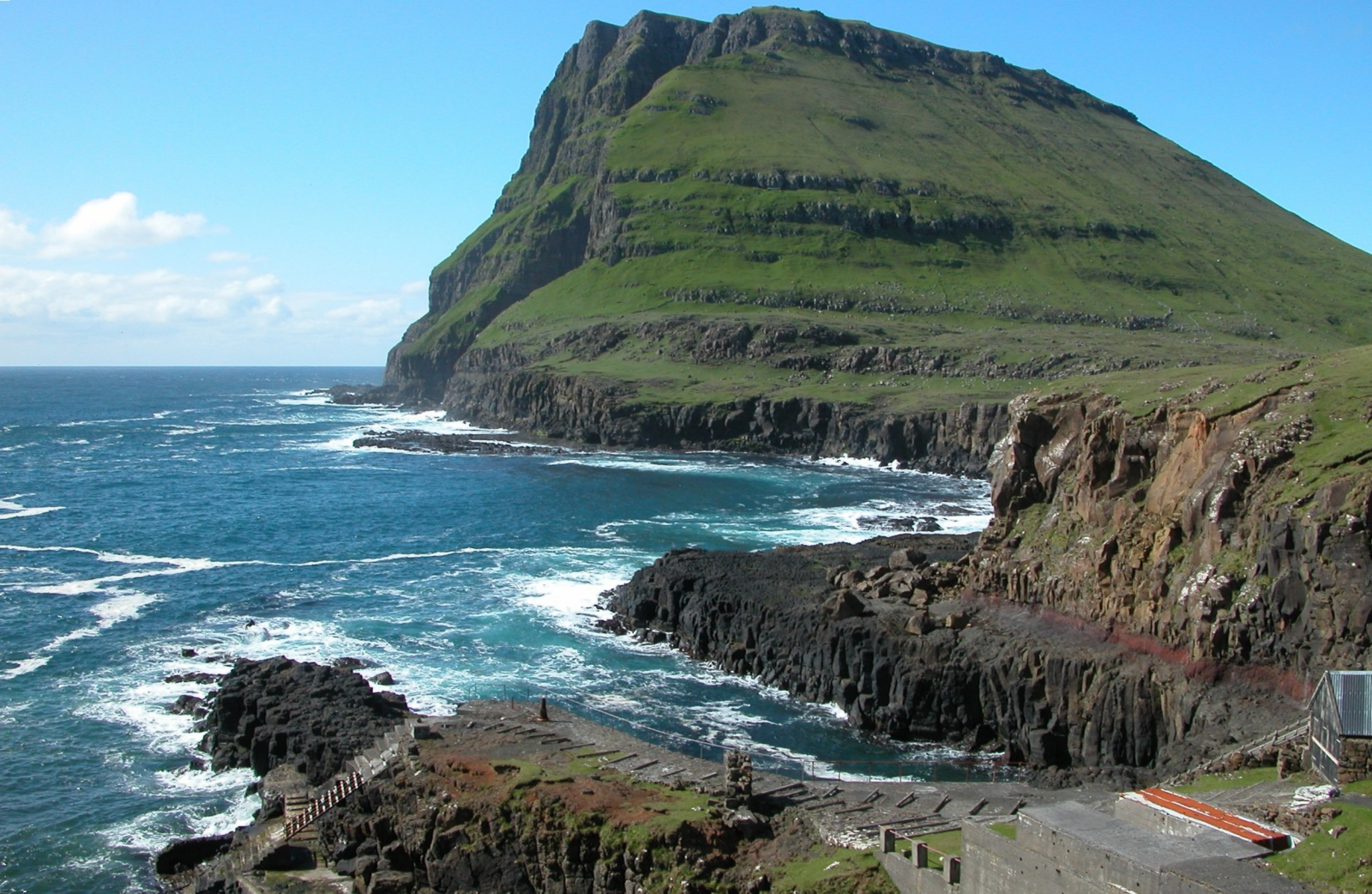
Hvalbiareiði and the mountain Grímsfjall .

Hvalbiareiði is also called Fiskieiði, it is located on the west coast of Suðuroy, west of the village Hvalba.

== History ==
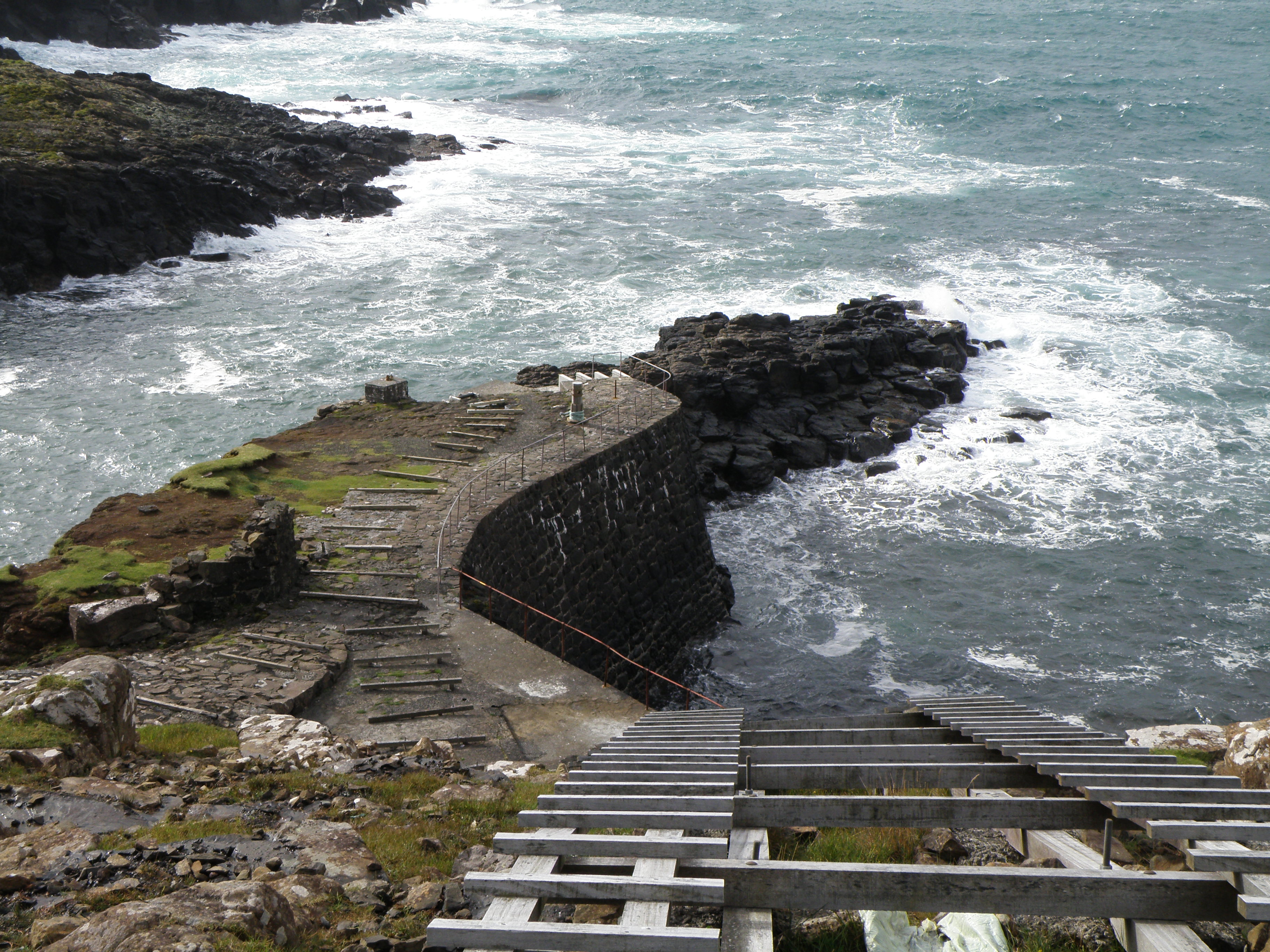
The harbour of Fiskieiði/Hvalbiareiði.

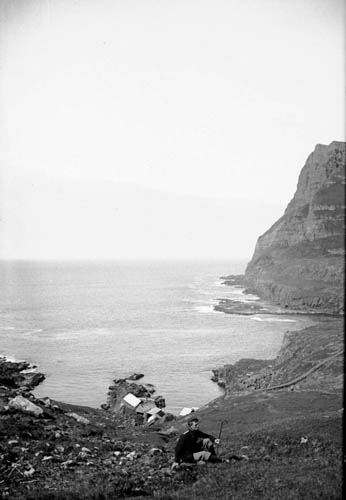
Hvalbiareiði around 1899.

Hvalbiareiði has been an important harbour for Hvalba in Suðuroy. Hvalba is located on an isthmus in the northern part of the island of Suðuroy, Faroe Islands. Fishing boats from Hvalba had and still have the opportunity to choose between the east and the west coast when they want to go fishing in wooden Faroese boats. Now most of the men work on board the trawlers of Hvalba, which use the harbour on the east coast. In the old days, before the boats got engines, the fish harbour (Fiskieiði) on the west coast was very important for the village. There were many boats and boathouses, up to 23 boats.

=== Niels L. Arge stood for the work in 1895 ===
In the 19th century men from Hvalba tried to use concrete to improve the facilities of the natural harbour, but they had problems with making it last. But in 1895 they asked Niels L. Arge from Argir, whose father was from Hvalba, if he could help them. He came to Hvalba and made the work last. They used 40 barrels of cement and every boat gave 8 barrels of sand for the work without any charge.

=== Jens Marius Poulsen from Skopun and the stone harbour in 1924 ===
In 1924 the men from Hvalba wanted to improve the harbour even more, and a great work started. It was Jens Marius Poulsen from Skopun, who was in charge of the work on the stone harbour. The stone harbour is still in good condition. But rough seas have taken a part of the cliff away, so the men of Hvalba had to use concrete instead, where the cliff had been.

=== Wooden Stocks on the harbour from 1890–1973 ===
In 1890 wood stocks were laid on the harbour of Fiskieiði, so that it would be easier to drag the boats to and from the sea. These stocks were there until 1973, when they were taken away, because they were in bad shape. The stocks from one of the gorges were replaced, but the ones from the other gorge were not replaced.

=== Road to Fiskieiði ===
The first road to Fiskieiði (Hvalbiareiði) was made in 1890, but not all the way, only to the so-called "Skallaportrið". The work continued on the rest of the road from time to time, but it was not all the way to the Fiskieði until after the first car had arrived in Hvalba in 1931. The road made it much easier for the fishermen, because they no longer had to carry the fish all the way back to the village. Hvalba was not connected with the neighbouring village of Trongisvágur until 1963 through a road tunnel, and with the other neighbour village Sandvík in 1969, also through a road tunnel. So cars or lorries in Hvalba in 1931 could only drive in the village, mainly to and from the coal mines and to and from the Hvalbiareiði on the west coast.
