= Sandur Hoard =

Coin hoard

Coordinates: 61°50′33″N 6°48′28″W

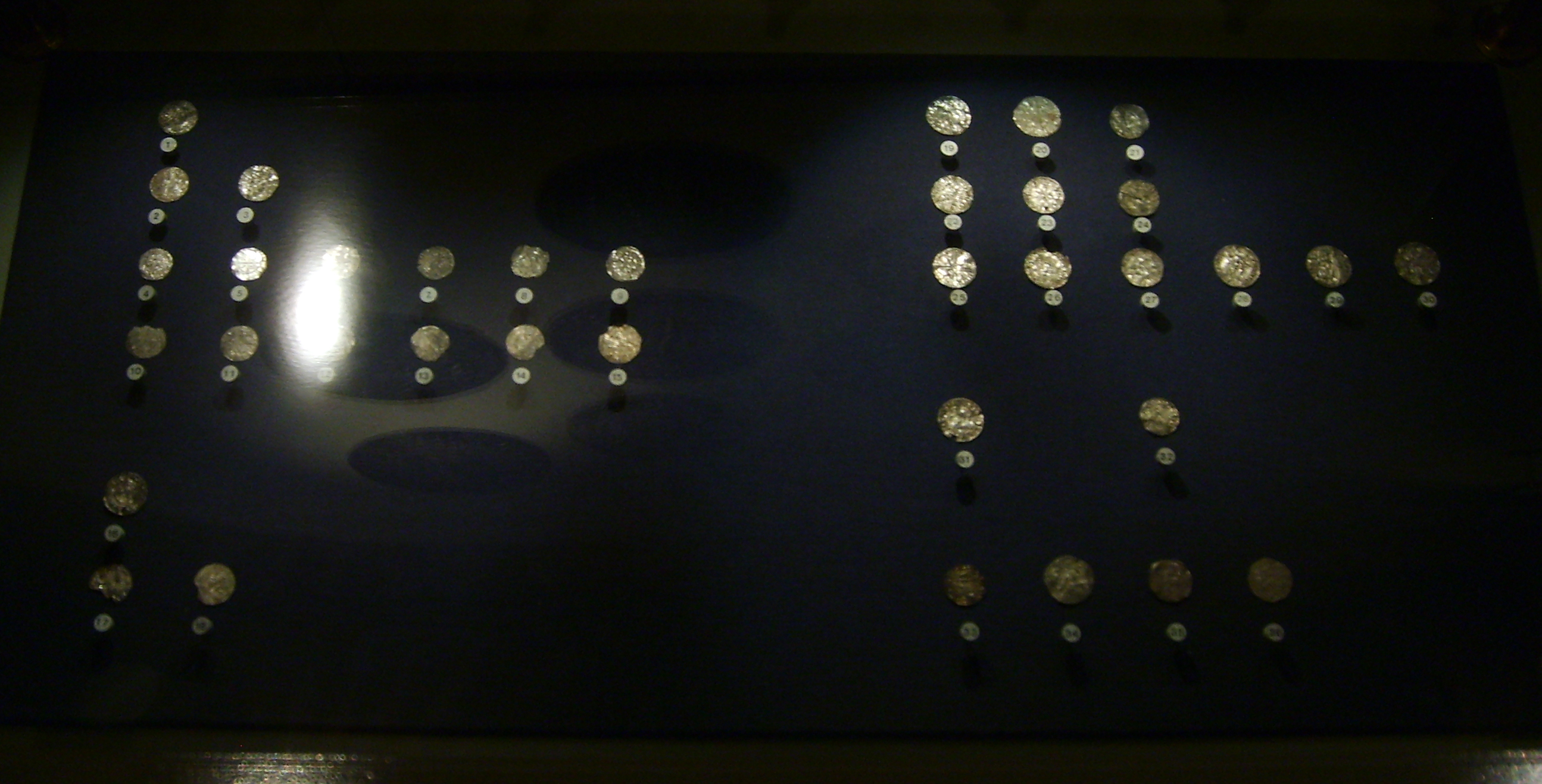
Some of the coins as displayed in the National Museum of the Faroe Islands

The Sandur hoard of the Faroe Islands was found in Sandur in 1863 and consists of 98 medieval silver coins, which were probably buried between 1070 and 1080. The hoard is the oldest and only coin hoard found on the archipelago.

The coin hoard from Sandur is interesting not only due to the age of the coins, but also due to their origin, because it indicates with which countries the Faroers already traded in the 11th century. It is generally assumed the Viking Age ended on the Faroe Islands in 1035. In the following time period, the Faroe Islands came increasingly under the influence of Norway, which then led to the actual monetary system of the Faroe Islands.

Today the coins are located at the National Museum of the Faroe Islands (Faroese: Føroya Fornminnissavn) in Tórshavn and are among the main attractions there.

== Find location and owner ==
The coins were found in 1863 purely by accident. Gravediggers were digging a grave in the cemetery of Sandur, which had to be particularly deep in order to bury the bodies of two plague victims.

The find location was at the spot where the altar of the first church of Sandur (the second church ever on the Faroe Island) stood. Today historians conjecture that this church was the private chapel of a wealthy farmer, since in the immediate neighborhood a Viking cemetery was excavated. It could be that this treasure belonged to the wealthy farmer and not to the church.

If the coins were from a wealthy farmer, the large number of coins from Germany point towards the export of Faroese wool there and/or to middlemen, who traded using these coins.

== Index of the coins ==
- The following coins came from England :
  - 3 from Ethelred II (978–1013 and 1014–1016)
  - 9 from Canute the Great (1016–1035), one of which was counterfeit
  - 3 from Harold Harefoot (1035–1040)
  - 8 from Edward the Confessor (1042–1066)
  - 1 not further identifiable counterfeit
- One coin from Ireland which couldn't be exactly dated, but is from ca. 1050
- From Denmark :
  - 2 from Canute III (1035–1042)
  - 1 from the period between 1050 and 1095
  - 2 counterfeits
- 17 coins were of Norwegian origin :
  - 1 from the co-reign of Magnus I and Harald III (1046–1047)
  - 2 from the time of Harald III (1047–1066)
  - 4 from the co-reign from Magnus II and Olaf III (1066–1069)
  - 10 not further datable coins, either from the above co-reign, or from the time of Olaf III (1069–1093)
- 50 coins originated from Germany:
  - 1 from Conrad II (1024–1039)
  - 2 from Bruno III of Brunswick (1038–1057)
  - 1 from Teoderik of Lorraine (959–1032)
  - 1 from Bishop Eberhard I of Augsburg (1029–1047) with the likeness of Conrad II
  - 1 from Bishop Bernold von Utrecht (1027–1054)
  - 1 coin of uncertain origin of the same type, as the above named coin from Utrecht (today the Netherlands)
  - 1 from Breisach
  - 1 from Celle
  - 1 from Deventer (today the Netherlands)
  - 1 from Duisburg
  - 1 from Goslar
  - 1 from Hoya
  - 1 from Magdeburg
  - 1 from Remagen
  - 1 from Speyer
  - 1 from Tiel (today the Netherlands)
  - 1 from Würzburg
  - 29 others, which could not be classified (as of 1979)
- As well as one coin from Hungary from the time of Stephen I (997–1038)

== Literature ==
- G.V.C. Young: From the Vikings to the Reformation. A Chronicle of the Faroe Islands up to 1538. Isle of Man: Shearwater Press, 1979
  - ibid: Færøerne. Fra vikingetiden til reformationen. Kopenhagen: Rosenkilde og Bakker, 1982 (Danish translation, basis for the original German version of this article)
