= Sandur, Faroe Islands =

Sandur
- Municipality and village
- Sandur Municipality; Sands kommuna (Faroese)
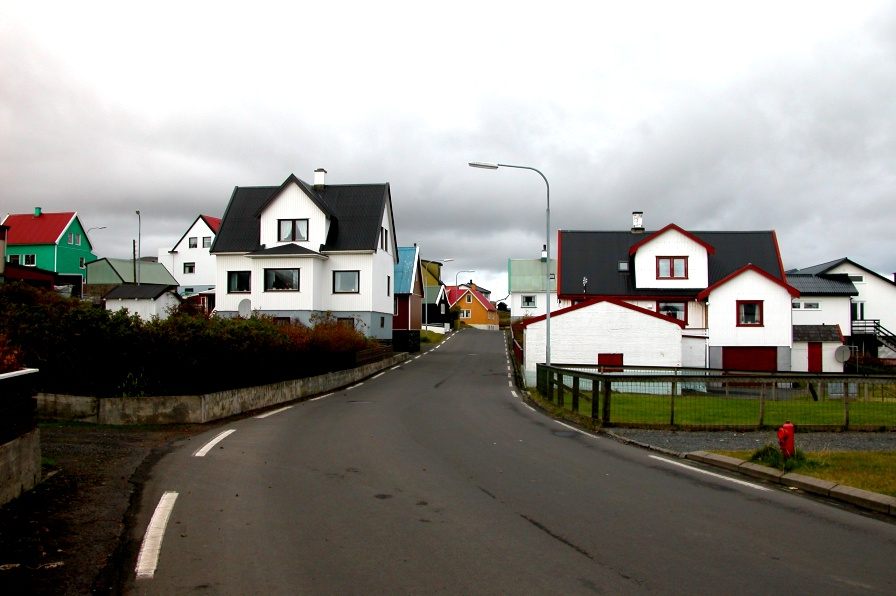

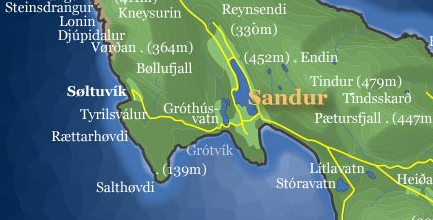

- Location in the Faroe Islands
- Coordinates: 61°50′10″N 6°48′38″W
- State: Kingdom of Denmark
- Constituent country: Faroe Islands
- Island: Sandoy

Government
  - Mayor: Brandur Sandoy

Area
  - Total: 48 km^{2} (19 sq mi)

Population (September 2024)
  - Total: 544
  - Density: 11/km^{2} (29/sq mi)
- Time zone: GMT
  - Summer (DST): UTC+1 (WEST)
- Postal code: FO 210
- Climate: Cfc
- Website: www.sandur.fo

Sandur (meaning sandy beach) is a village on the south coast of the island of Sandoy in the Faroe Islands. The Sandur hoard of silver coins, dating to the end of the 11th century, attests to the long history of the village. In January 2024, the population stood at 529.

The municipality of Sandur consists of the village of Sandur only. It is the most populous place on the "Sand Island", and is situated on a peninsula between the lakes of Gróthúsvatn in the northwest and Sandsvatn in the northeast, facing the inlets of Grótvík and Sandsvágur in the south.

== History ==
Sandur is an old site of the thing where every year the local Várting was held. Excavations here have unearthed a stave church from the 11th century, where today there is a typical Faroese wooden church with a grass roof. In 1988, the modern church suffered a devastating fire in which all of the church's silver melted. The fire turned out to be arson. In the following year, the church was restored, just in time for its 150th anniversary.

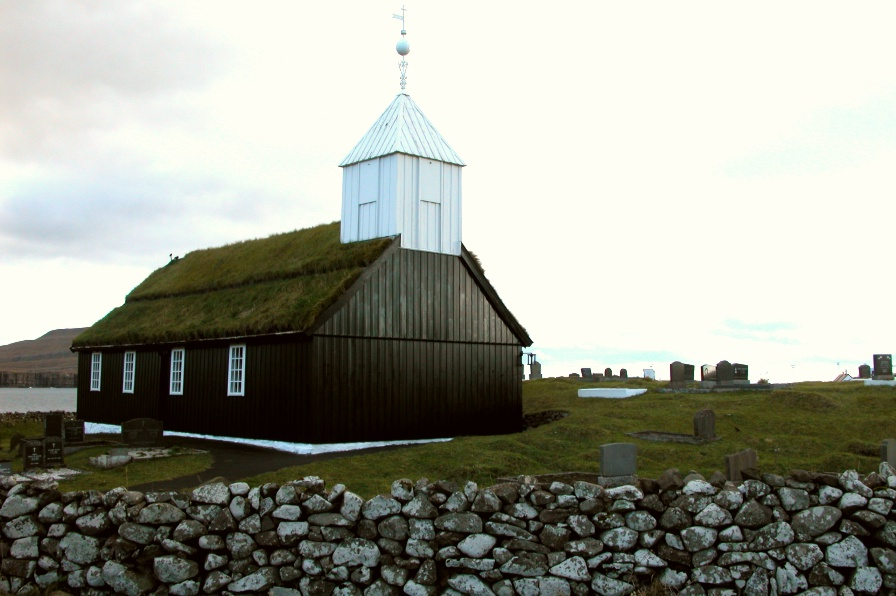
The most reliable information of a church in the Faroe Islands is that of Sandur, dating back to the 11th century.

In 1863 while extending the churchyard, a treasure of silver was found consisting of 98 coins from the 11th century, half of them of German origin. Furthermore, in 1989 archaeologists discovered a pagan burial ground from the times of Viking occupation. The burial included the well-preserved skeleton of a woman from the Faroe Islands in a grave 1.5 m (4 ft 11 in) long. The grave also included three beads of amber, a blue glass bead, and a knife.

In the open-air museum of the Danish national museum close to Copenhagen one can see a water-mill which originally, in the 18th century, was installed in Sandur. The local museum Sands Bygdasavn is open in summer. It displays objects of everyday life belonging to the ancestors of the local inhabitants.

== Transport and tourism ==
Sandur can be reached from Tórshavn via the Sandoyartunnilin in circa 30 minutes. A direct Strandfaraskip Landsins bus service connects the two. All villages on the island except Skarvanes can be reached by bus from Sandur. They are therefore suitable for day trips. Due to the topography of the island walking-tours are suitable for casual strolling and cyclists. Popular trips are to Søltuvík on the west coast, Skarvanes in the south (with slightly more demanding hiking) and Húsavík on the east coast.

The small passenger only ferry MV Sildberin departs Sandur for Skúvoy, an island to the south. Particularly interesting is the tour in the Faroese rowboat Hvíthamar from Sandur to the bird rocks on the west coast or to Skúvoy. Boatbuilder Jóan Petur Clementsen himself is rowing.

The campsite á Munkinum is one of the camping sites on Sandoy. The other two camping sites are in Húsavík and Dalur. In addition Sandsvatn and Gróthúsvatn are attractive places for fishing. The Hotel Ísansgarður has been reconstructed. The tourist information in Sandur provides up-to-date information on private accommodation and holiday homes.

== Climate ==
Climate data for Sandur, Sandoy, 5 m.a.s.l.
Month	Jan	Feb	Mar	Apr	May	Jun	Jul	Aug	Sep	Oct	Nov	Dec	Year
Record high °C (°F)	11.1 (52.0)	13.2 (55.8)	12.2 (54.0)	13.2 (55.8)	18.9 (66.0)	19.0 (66.2)	21.4 (70.5)	19.8 (67.6)	15.4 (59.7)	14.8 (58.6)	12.4 (54.3)	12.4 (54.3)	21.4 (70.5)
Mean daily maximum °C (°F)	5.7 (42.3)	5.9 (42.6)	6.3 (43.3)	7.5 (45.5)	9.8 (49.6)	11.8 (53.2)	13.0 (55.4)	13.2 (55.8)	11.3 (52.3)	9.5 (49.1)	7.1 (44.8)	6.1 (43.0)	8.9 (48.0)
Daily mean °C (°F)	3.9 (39.0)	4.1 (39.4)	4.3 (39.7)	5.5 (41.9)	7.7 (45.9)	9.6 (49.3)	11.0 (51.8)	11.2 (52.2)	9.5 (49.1)	7.8 (46.0)	5.4 (41.7)	4.2 (39.6)	7.0 (44.6)
Mean daily minimum °C (°F)	1.6 (34.9)	1.9 (35.4)	2.1 (35.8)	3.2 (37.8)	5.4 (41.7)	7.5 (45.5)	9.1 (48.4)	9.4 (48.9)	7.5 (45.5)	5.8 (42.4)	3.2 (37.8)	1.9 (35.4)	4.9 (40.8)
Record low °C (°F)	−7.8 (18.0)	−6.0 (21.2)	−7.9 (17.8)	−5.1 (22.8)	−2.4 (27.7)	0.7 (33.3)	4.4 (39.9)	3.1 (37.6)	0.8 (33.4)	−2.3 (27.9)	−6.1 (21.0)	−9.3 (15.3)	−9.3 (15.3)
Average precipitation mm (inches)	133 (5.2)	89 (3.5)	110 (4.3)	69 (2.7)	64 (2.5)	58 (2.3)	71 (2.8)	78 (3.1)	118 (4.6)	146 (5.7)	125 (4.9)	131 (5.2)	1,193 (47.0)
Average precipitation days (≥ 1.0 mm)	19	15	18	13	11	11	12	11	16	19	17	19	179
Source: Danish Meteorological Institute

== Sands Listasavn Art Museum ==
The Art Museum of Sandur is open from May to October every day except for Monday from 14:00–16:00. In wintertime it is open Sundays from 14:00–16:00. The museum and its art works were a gift from Sofus Olsen. It was built in 2005 and handed over to the municipality of Sandur in December 2005, on Olsen's 92nd birthday.

== Sport ==
Sandur is best known for its football club, B71 Sandoy, which has enjoyed modest success in both the Faroe Islands Premier League and UEFA.

== Gallery ==
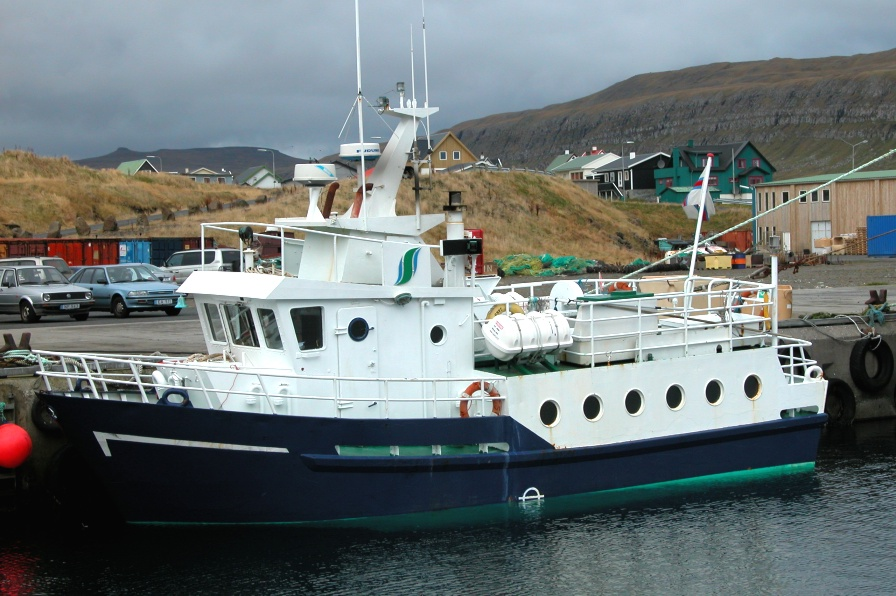
Harbour scene in Sandur. The ferry MV Sildberin to one of the southern islands: Skúvoy.

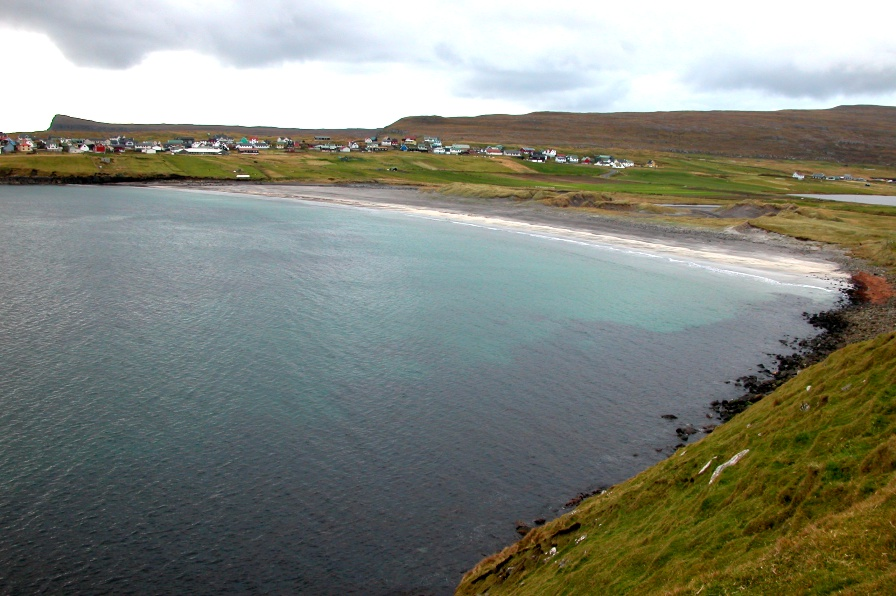
The inlet Sandsvágur and the sandy beach after which the village is called. This is the only beach on the Faroe Islands with dunes and beach grass.

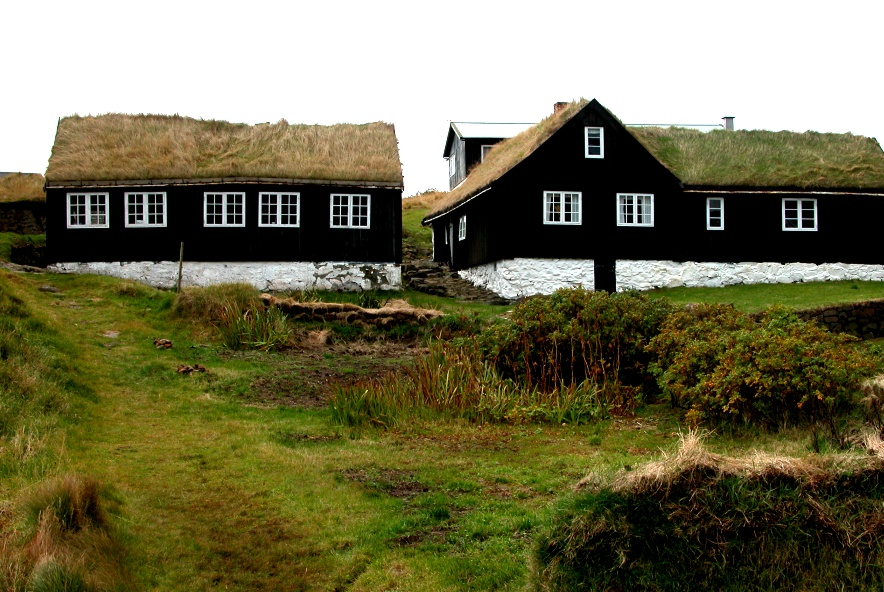
Sands Bygdasavn, the local museum in Sandur, traditional wooden houses with grass roof.

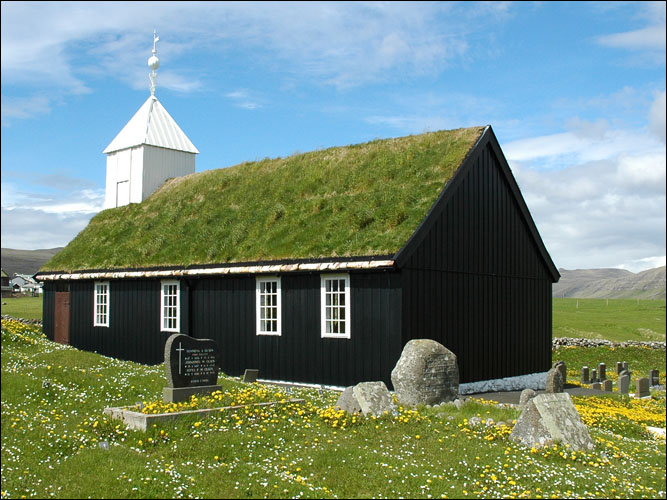
Church of Sandur, Faroe Islands.

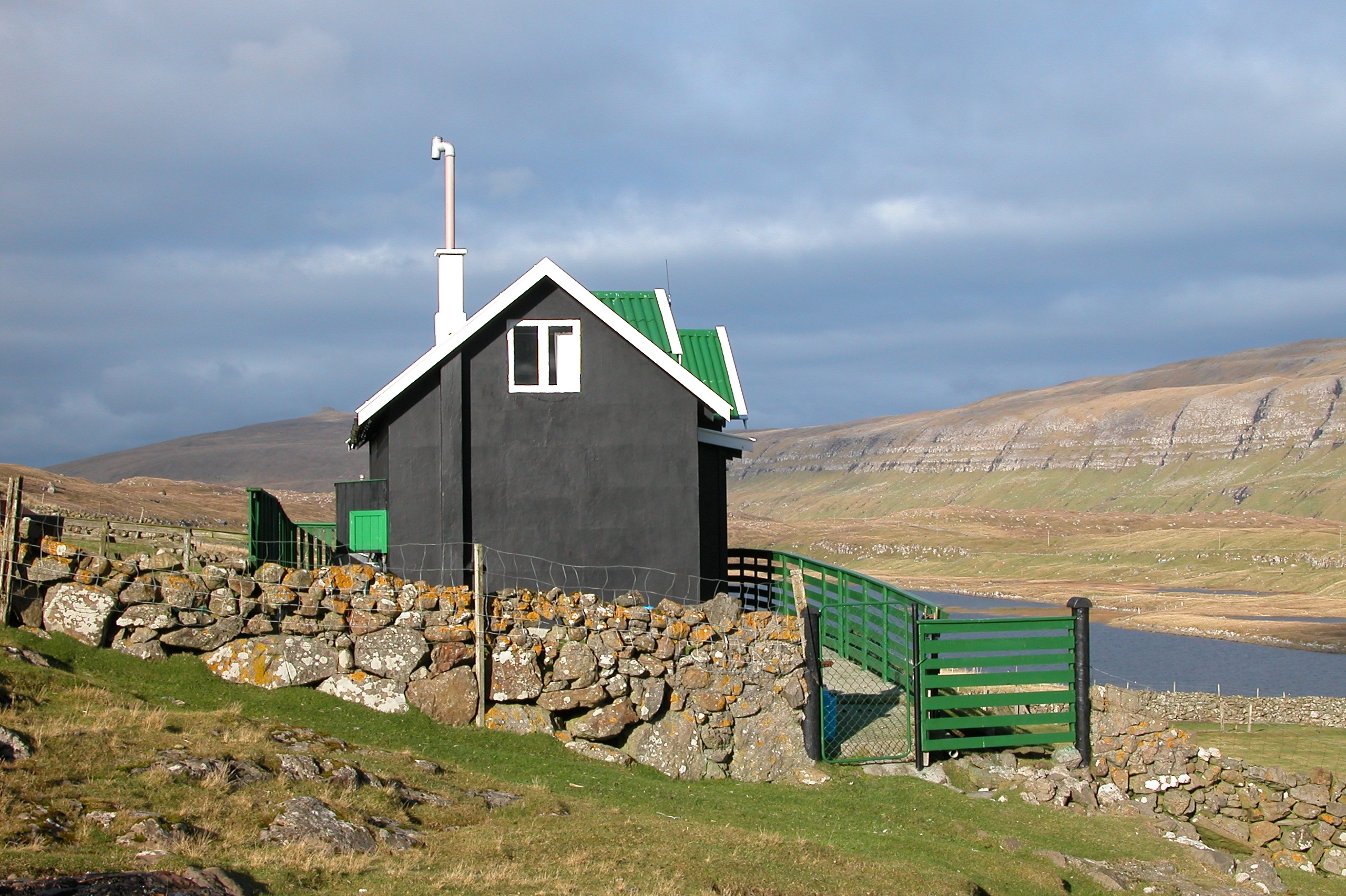
West of Sandur on Sandoy, Faroe Islands.

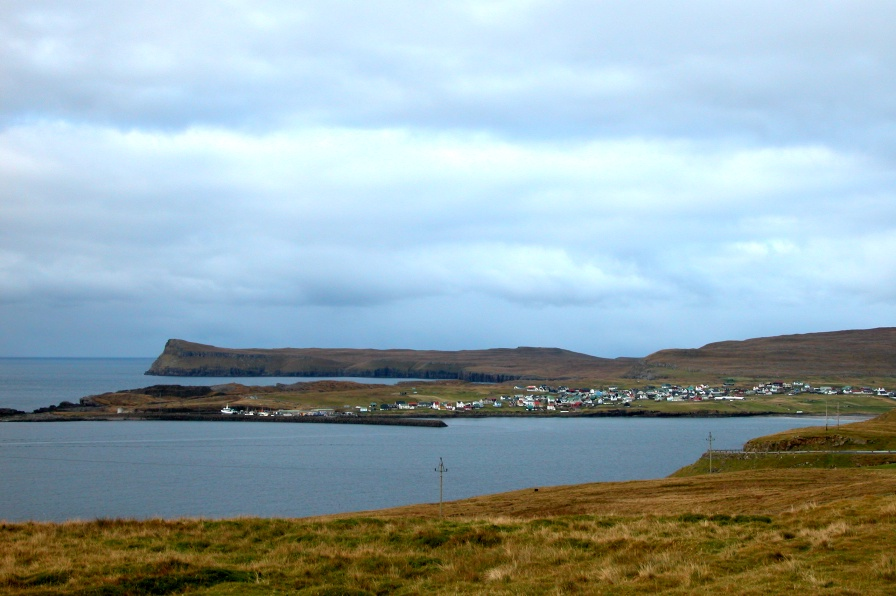
Sandur, view from the bay Sandsvágur in the Southeast.

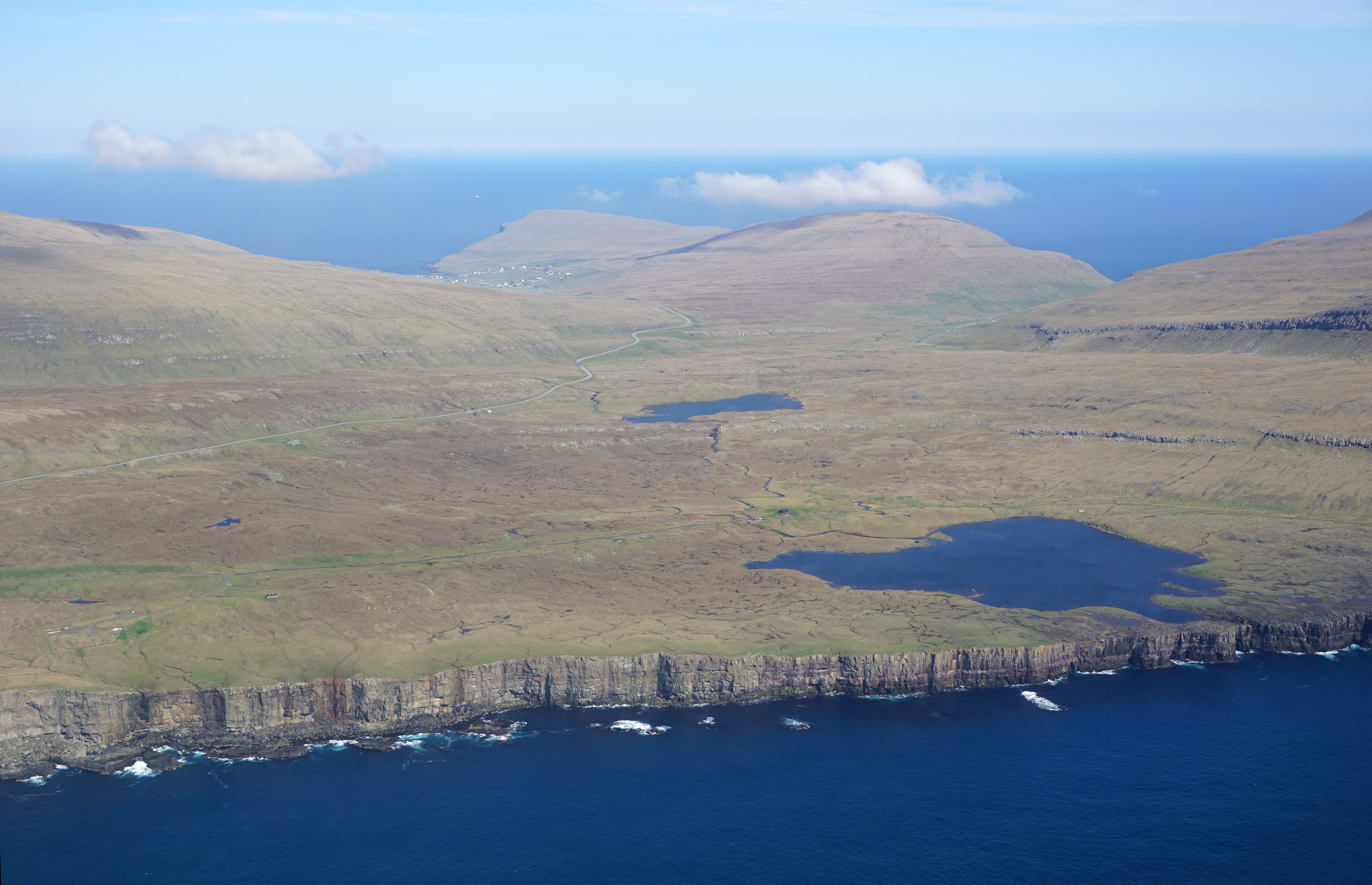
Stóravatn and Lítlavatn south of Sandur seen from a helicopter.

== See also ==
- List of towns in the Faroe Islands
- History of the Faroe Islands
- Sandur hoard
