= Brandur Sandoy =

Faroese politician, sheep farmer, and businessman (born 1973)

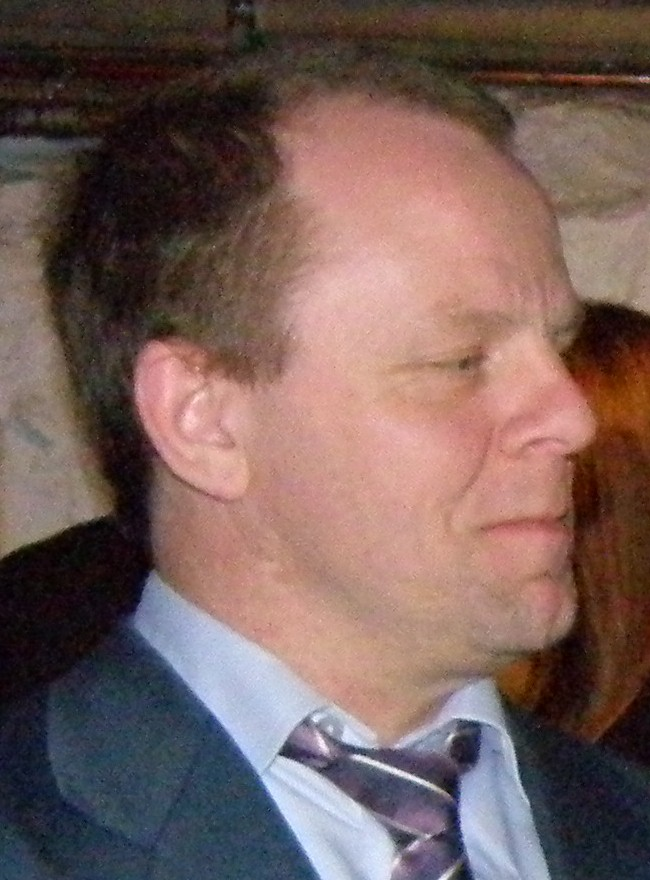
- Brandur Sandoy in 2010

Mayor of Sandur
- Incumbent
- Assumed office 2009
- Preceded by: Páll á Reynatúgvu

Member of Parliament
- In office 2011 – December 2022

Personal details
- Born: 23 April 1973 (age 53) Sandur, Faroe Islands, Faroe Islands
- Party: People's Party (Fólkaflokkurin)
- Spouse: Anja Sandoy (née Sandá)

Brandur Sandoy (born 23 April 1973 in Sandur, Faroe Islands) is a Faroese politician, sheep farmer and businessman. His surname is the same as the name of the island Sandoy, where he lives. He runs a sheep farm in Inni í Dal between Sandur and Skopun, near the school and football stadium of B71 Sandoy. He also runs a small business named BS-Smíð and rents a holiday home together with his wife Anja Sandoy, with whom he has three children: Várdis, Pauli and Pál. He is a former football player, he played for B71 Sandoy in the 1990s.

== Political career ==
Sandoy was elected to the town council of Sandur in November 2008 and took seat in the town council on 1 January 2009. At that time Páll á Reynatúgvu was mayor, but in October 2009 Brandur Sandoy became mayor. In November 2011 he became a member of the Faroese parliament representing People's Party (Fólkaflokkurin), the Løgting. He was not elected directly, but because his party the People's Party became a member of the coalition, three of the elected members of the People's Party became ministers and these persons who all were elected to the Løgting were granted leave from the Løgting which is common practise in the Faroe Islands. Sandoy took Jørgen Niclasen's seat, who became Finance Minister. He is member of the Committee of Justice (one of the standing committees of the Løgting), and vice member of The Welfare Committee and of the Committee on Fisheries and Industry. Sandoy is vice president of the West Nordic Council since January 2014.
