= Sandvík =

- Village
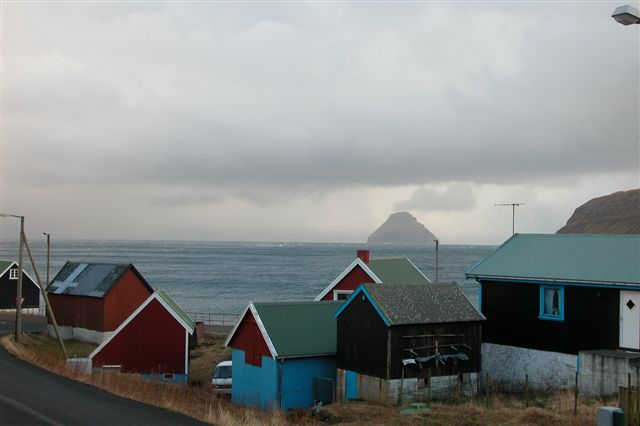
- Sandvík with Lítla Dímun in the background

- Location within the Faroe Islands
- Coordinates: 61°38′16″N 6°55′19″W
- State: Kingdom of Denmark
- Constituent country: Faroe Islands
- Municipality: Hvalba Municipality

Population (September 2025)
  - Total: 66
- Postal code: FO 860
- Climate: Cfc

Sandvík (pronounced [ˈsanvʊik], "Sandy Bay"; Danish: Sandvig) is the northernmost village of the island of Suðuroy in the Faroe Islands. It is situated on the northern side of a shallow fjord. The village was previously known as Hvalvík (Bay of Whales). It changed its name to Sandvík in 1913 as there was too much confusion regarding mail delivery, because there is another village named Hvalvík on Streymoy. The village had originally been known as Sandvík during the Viking Age.

== History ==
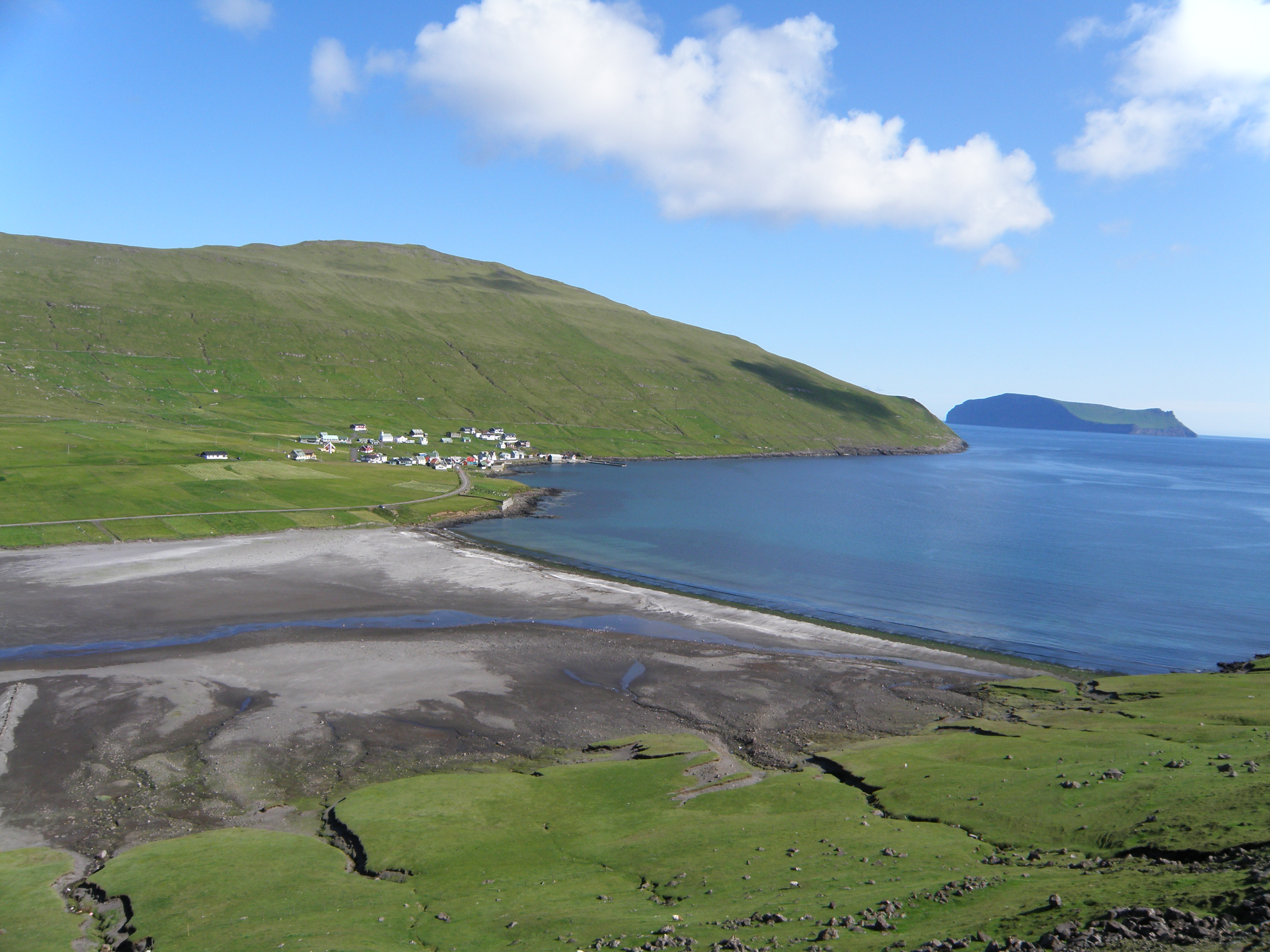
Sandvík and Stóra Dímun as seen from just outside the tunnel from Hvalba.

Sandvík is the place where Viking chief Sigmundur Brestisson was murdered after his long swim from Skúvoy in an attempt to flee from Tróndur í Gøtu. When Sigmundur came ashore exhausted to what he thought would be safety, the local farmer Torgrímur Illi fell upon him with his sons, and decapitated him for the golden bracelet he wore on his arm.

In 1349 the village became deserted, the inhabitants having been wiped out by the Black Death. It would not be until 1816 that the village was once more inhabited.

The church in Sandvík was built Á Bø in Froðba in 1840. Later, in 1856, it was moved to Tvøroyri, because more people lived there than in Froðba. And finally in 1908 it was moved to Sandvík, after Tvøroyri got a new and larger church.

On 13 February 1915 a tragic accident occurred in Sandvík during a whale hunt in the bay. Two of the boats capsized and 14 of 15 young men on board lost their lives, they came from Sandvík and the neighbouring village, Hvalba. Later a memorial was raised in Sandvík in memory of the 14 men.

== Overview ==
=== The Road Tunnel from 1969 ===
Sandvík is connected to the road system of the island through a 1500-metre tunnel, which was bored through the mountains in 1969. The tunnel has only one lane, and passing places where cars can go aside in order to let other cars pass by. The tunnel is located up in the mountain on the southern arm, on the opposite side of the village, which is located on the northern arm of the bay.

=== Húsið uttan Ánna - A Historical Home and Museum ===
There is a small museum called "Húsið uttan Ánna" (The House by the River) in the centre of the village. It is located in a traditional Faroese house dating from 1866. The house has a turf roof.

=== Ásmundarstakkur - A Sea Stack West of Sandvík ===
A narrow road leads from Sandvík to the west coast where many sea birds nest in the cliffs. Ásmundarstakkur is a 97-metre high detached sea stack which is home to puffins and other sea birds.

=== Writers from Sandvík ===
At least two writers came from Sandvík:

- Martin Joensen (1902–1966) was a teacher and a writer. He wrote about fishermen and the Faroese society in small villages. He wrote two novels: Fiskimenn, 1946 (Fishermen) and Tað lýsir á landi, 1952. He also wrote short stories.
- Steinbjørn B. Jacobsen (1937–2012) was a teacher and a writer (poet, novel writer, short story writer, play-writer, memoir-writer).

== Gallery ==
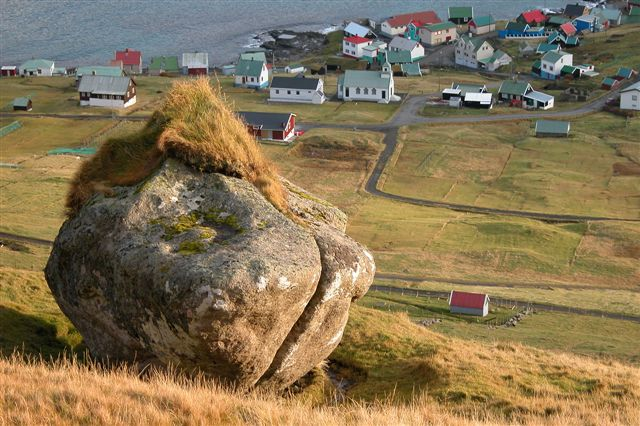
Sandvík seen from the mountain north of the village.

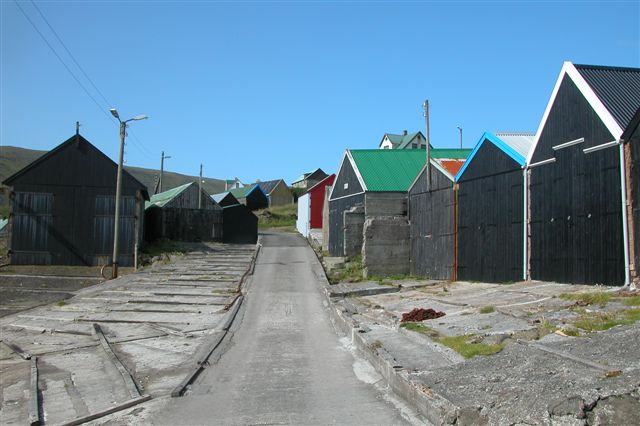
Boat houses in the harbour of Sandvík.

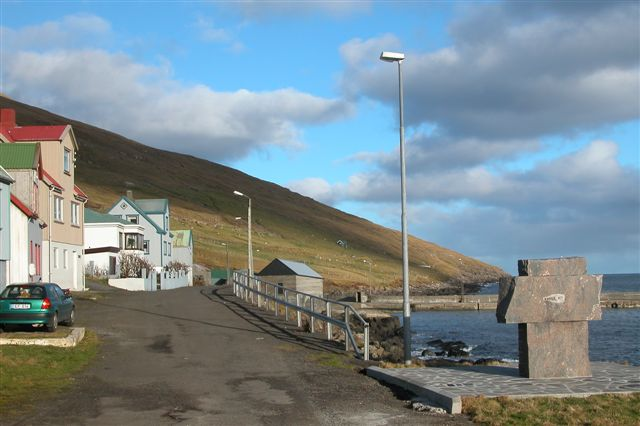
Memorial in memory of Sigmundur Brestisson, made by sculptor Hans Pauli Olsen in 2006.

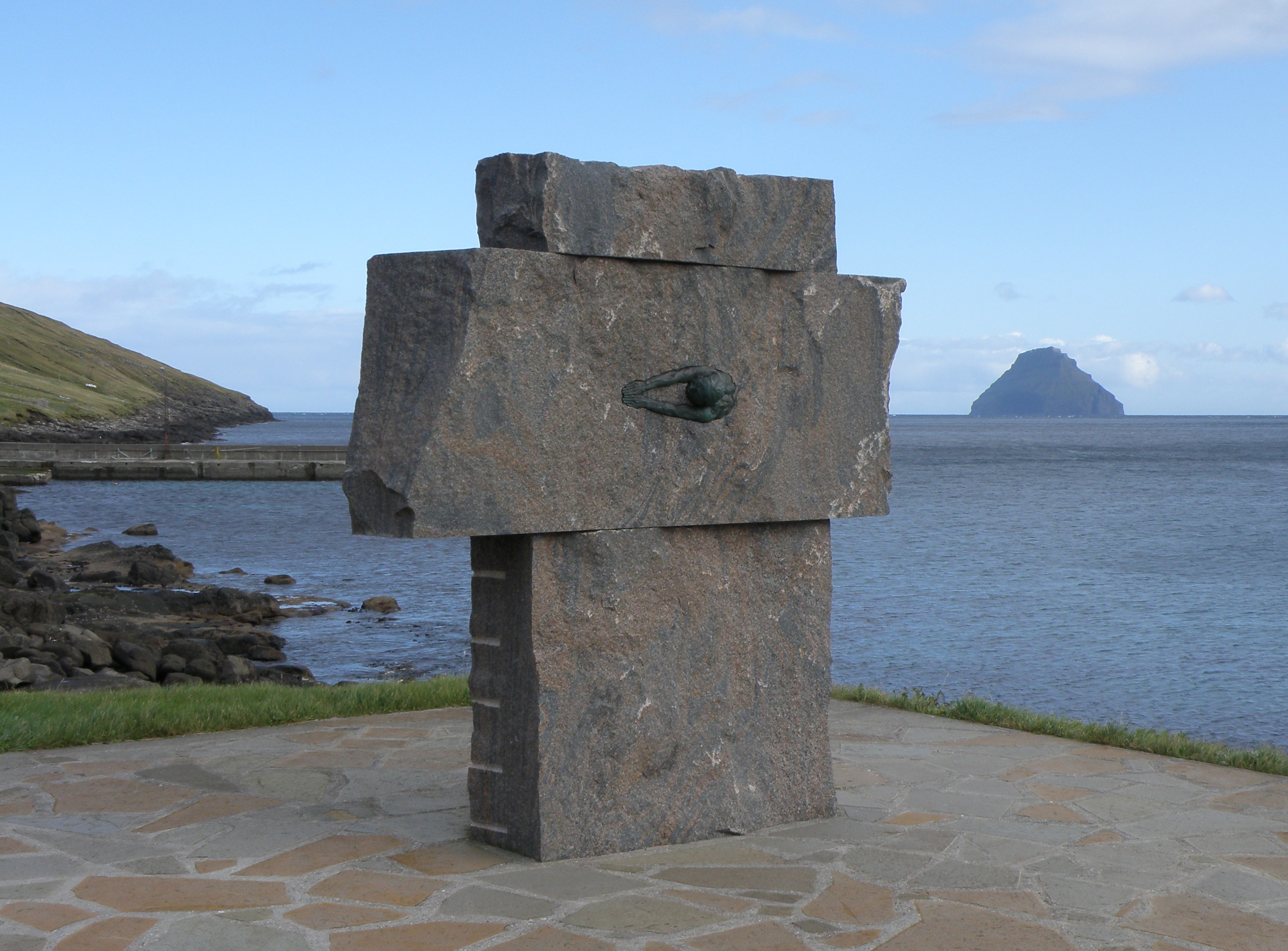
Memorial in memory of Sigmundur Brestisson, made by sculptor Hans Pauli Olsen in 2006.

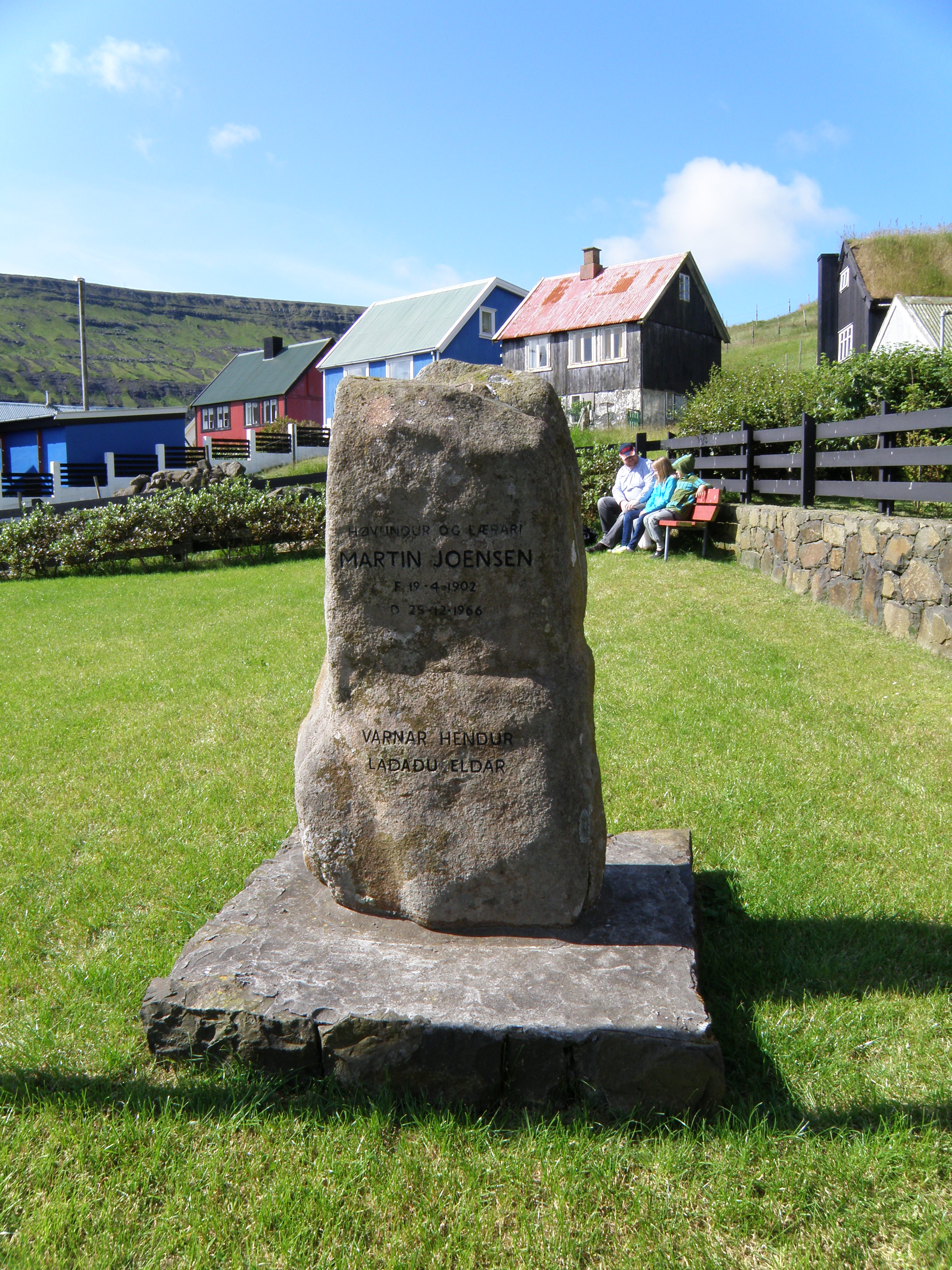
Memorial in memory of the writer Martin Joensen who was born in Sandvík in 1902.

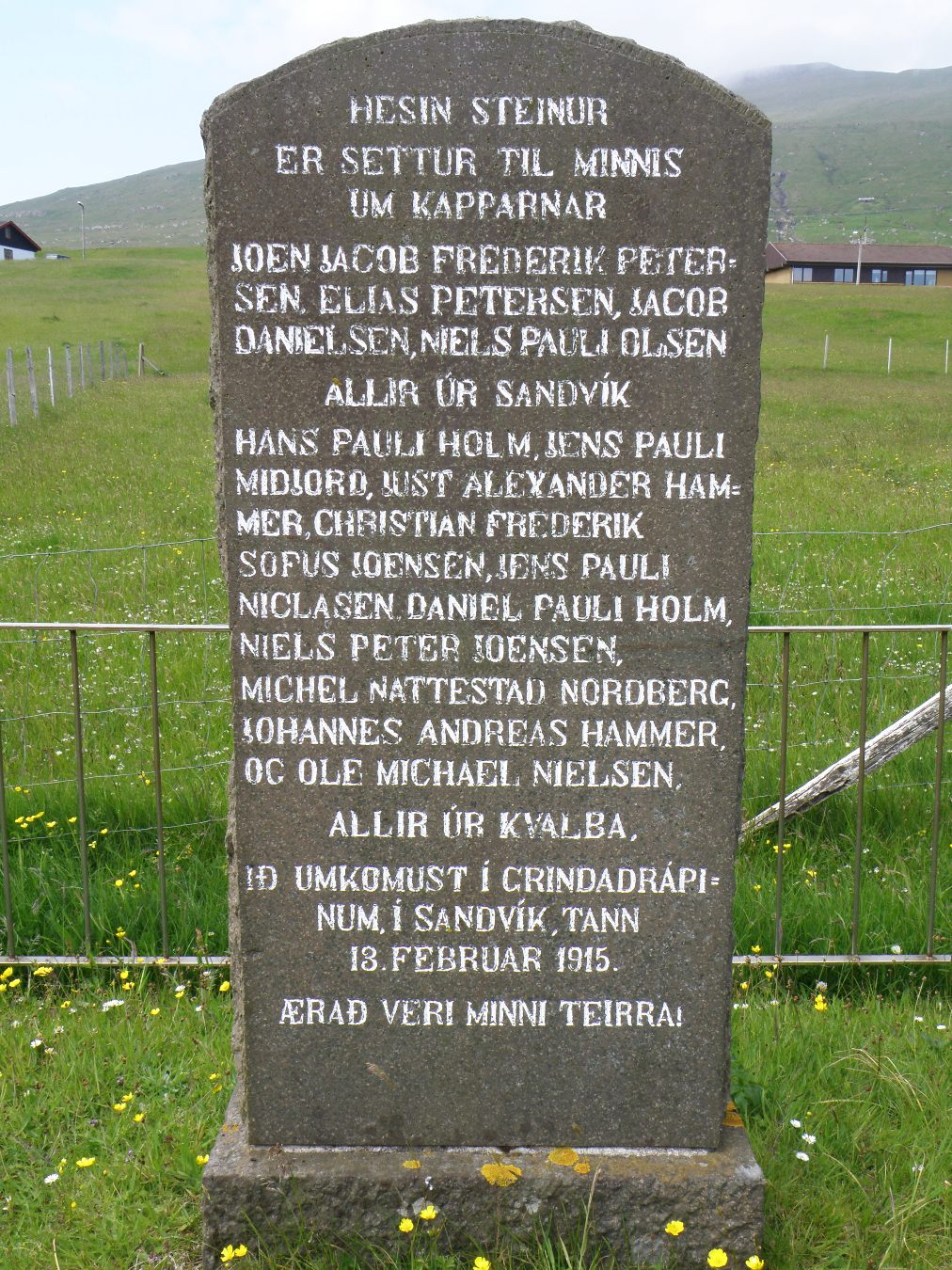
Memorial in memory of a whaling accident in 1915.

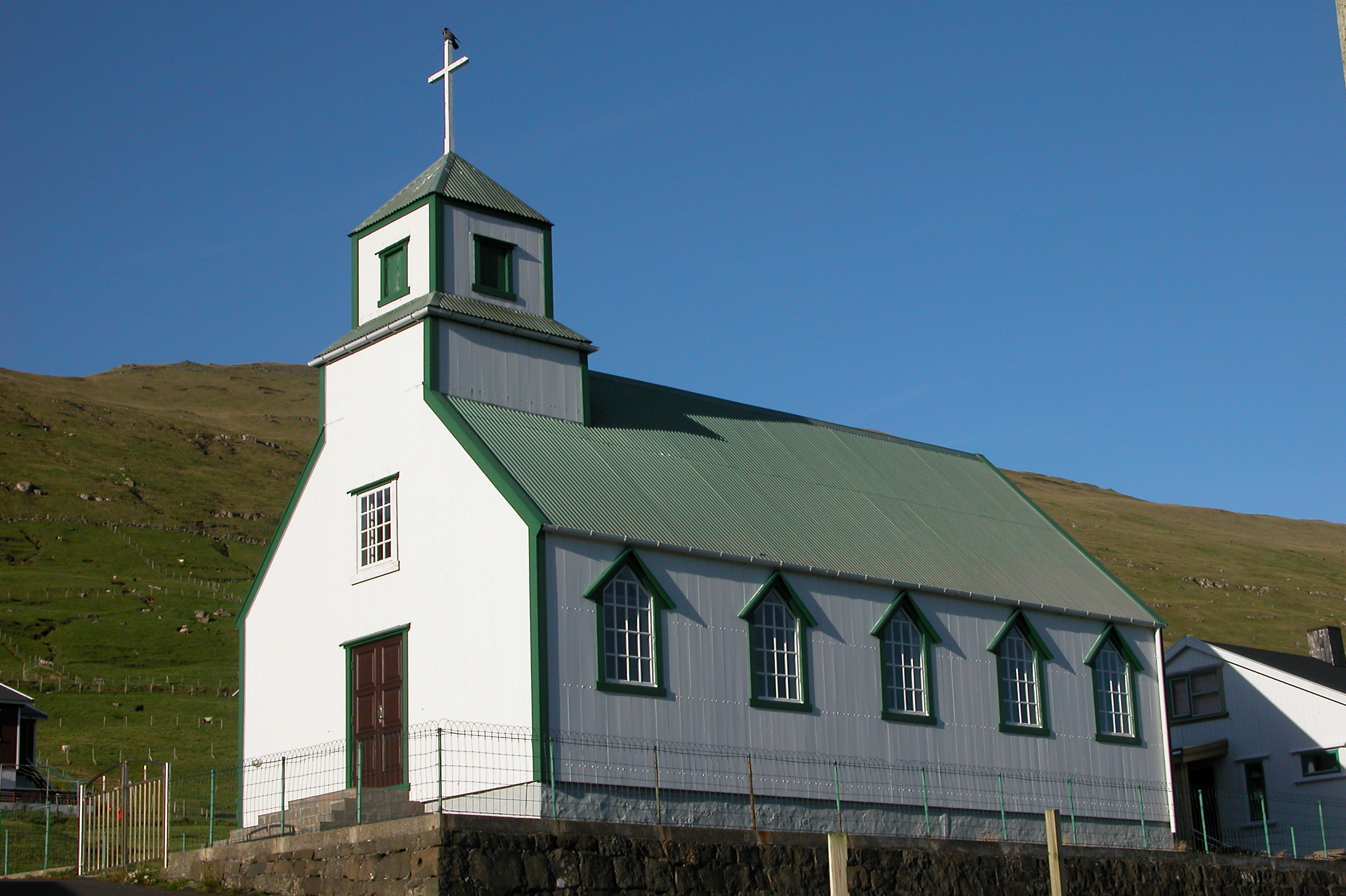
The church of Sandvík.

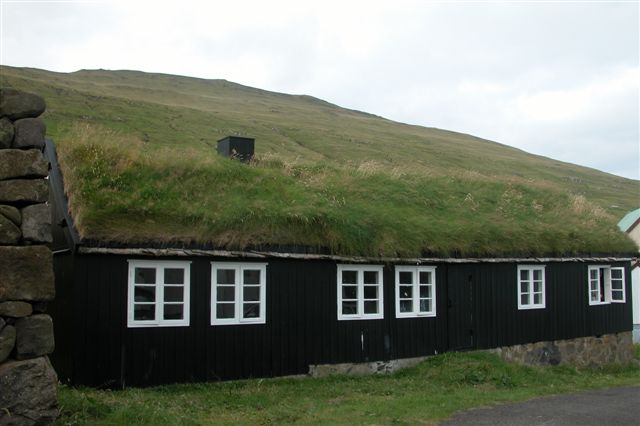
Húsið uttan Ánna, a historical home, museum.

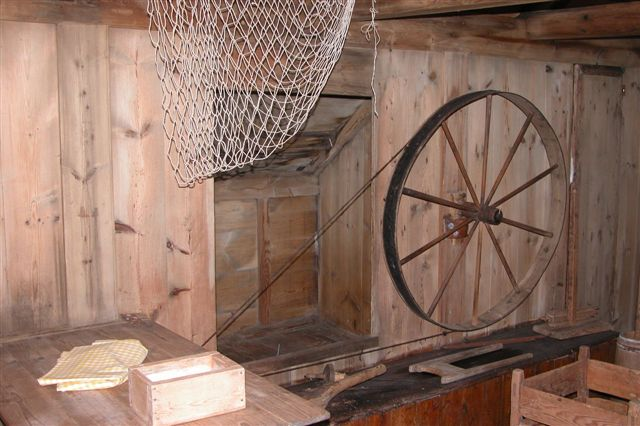
Inside Húsið uttan Ánna, museum.

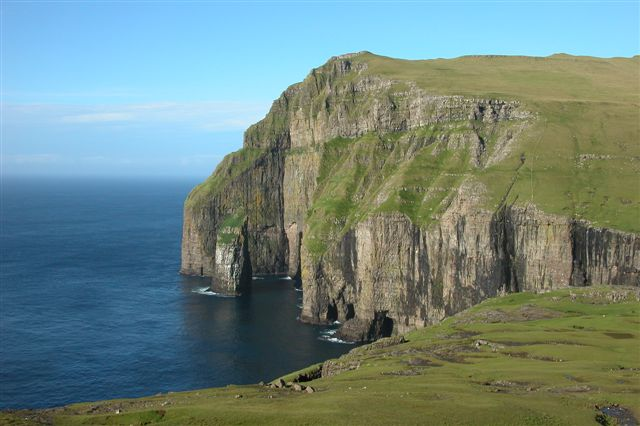
Ásmundarstakkur, a sea stack west of Sandvík.

== See also ==
- List of towns in the Faroe Islands
