= Hvalba =

Hvalba Kvalbø (Danish)
- Municipality and village
- Hvalba Municipality; Hvalbiar kommuna (Faroese)
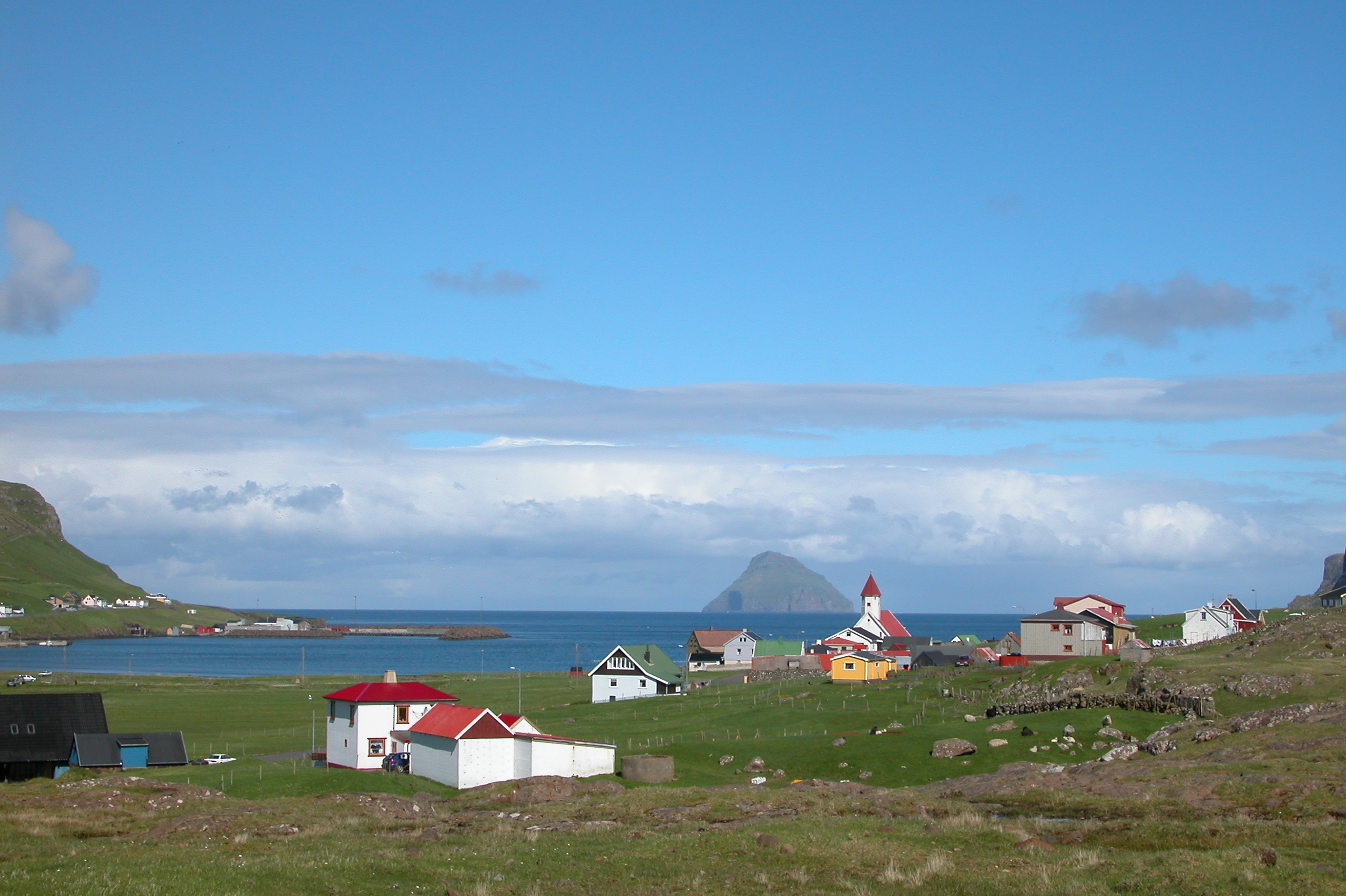
- Hvalba, looking towards Lítla Dímun island

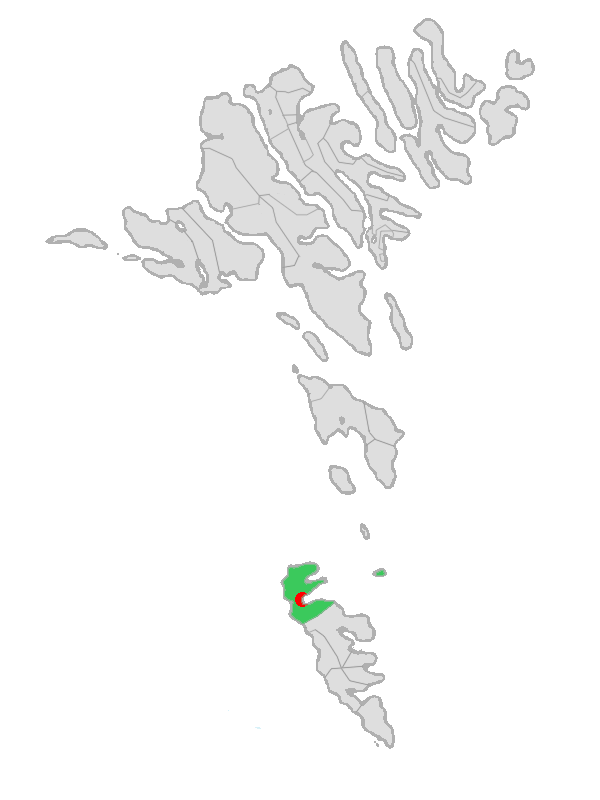
- Location of Hvalbiar kommuna in the Faroe Islands

- Location of Hvalba village in the Faroe Islands
- Coordinates: 61°36′7″N 6°56′58″W
- State: Kingdom of Denmark
- Constituent country: Faroe Islands
- Island: Suðuroy

Government
  - Mayor: Janus Thomsen

Area
  - Municipality: 16.83 km^{2} (6.50 sq mi)

Population (September 2025)
  - Municipality: 639
  - Village: 559
- Time zone: GMT
  - Summer (DST): UTC+1 (WEST)
- Postal code: FO 850
- Climate: Cfc
- Website: Hvalba.fo

Hvalba (Danish: Kvalbø) is a village and a municipality in the Faroe Islands, which consists of Hvalba, Nes-Hvalba and Sandvík.

The village spreads around the bottom of a deep inlet, Hvalbiarfjørður, in the northeast of Suðuroy.

== Population ==
Hvalba is one of the larger villages in the Faroe Islands. The total population of Hvalba Municipality (Hvalbiar Kommuna) is 639 as of March 2022; the population of Hvalba is 569 and the population of Sandvík is 70. The small village Nes is often called Nes-Hvalba, because there are two other villages with the same name. Nes is located on the southern arm of the fjord Hvalbiarfjørður, opposite of Hvalba. Nes does not have its own postal code. Hvalba has one supermarket, a fast food shop and a few more shops. Some of the villagers work as coalminers; Hvalba is the only place in the Faroes which still has active coal mine industry, although in very small scale. There are two harbours and some fish factories in Hvalba, both harbours are on the northern side of the bay. There is a boat harbour in Nes and a small harbour in Sandvík. The municipality plans to make a new marina between the two harbours on a place which is called Á Hamranesi. Some trawlers belong to the village, they deliver fish for the fish factory. Some people work in other villages i.e. at the Suduroy Hospital in Tvøroyri or at the Faroe Islands Ferry and Buss Transportation Company including the ferry Smyril, which sails between Suðuroy and Tórshavn, but there are also a few independent small companies in Hvalba, i.e. IT supporters, carpenters, transport company, dietitian, internet shop etc. Hvalba is located on the east side of the island but the inlet is so deep that the distance to the west coast is quite short, so the island almost splits into two islands. There are two isthmuses in Hvalba: Hvalbiareiði (also called Fiskieiði) and Norðbergseiði (also called Á Drátti). There is a memorial in Hvalba, it is located on the northern side of the fjord, just before one comes to the first harbour, not far from the bottom of the bay. The memorial is made of stone, the stonework was made by Lars and Helmut Larsen from Tórshavn, it was raised in 1963 in memory of people from Hvalba who lost their lives at sea or by other accidents, i.e. by accidents in the coal mines or by falling down from the island Lítla Dímun or from one of the mountains which surround the village.

== Connected by tunnels ==
Two tunnels connect Hvalba to its neighbouring villages. The southbound Hvalbiartunnilin (1450 m) leads to Trongisvágur and Tvøroyri. The northbound Sandvíkartunnilin (1500 m) leads to Sandvík. Construction of a new tunnel to Trongisvágur started in 2019, and was opened to traffic in 2021, whereupon the old tunnel was closed.

== Hvalbiareiði and Norðbergseiði ==
On the west coast there is a place of call that makes it possible to go fishing in small boats from both sides of the island. The place has two names; it is called Hvalbiareiði or Fiskieiði. The name Hvalbiareiði refers to the name of the village Hvalba, Fiskieiði refers to the fact that this place used to be a fish harbour. There are still a few boat houses there, but most of them are ruins. Most of the men of Hvalba are members of the crews of one of the trawlers of the village. Many people from Hvalba own their share of these trawlers. There is another "Eiði" in Hvalba, it is called Norðbergseiði, named after a mountain nearby, which is called Norðberg. Norðbergseiði is the northern one of the two "eidi". Norðbergseiði and Hvalbiareiði are separated by the mountain Grímsfjall (the Mountain of Grímur).

== Tourism ==
Tourism has been developing over the past few years. Some people from Hvalba started to arrange boat trips to the uninhabited island Lítla Dímun in 2009, and the same year some men from Hvalba started to offer síging, which is a kind of rappelling (abseiling) for tourists on Norðbergseiði. There have also been arranged BBQ evenings with blues music on Fiskieiði combined with boat trips along the cliffs of Hvalba and rappelling. The coal mines are also a tourist attraction. There are high mountains around Hvalba, some tourists enjoy going for hiking trips from Nes-Hvalba via the gorge Káragjógv to Trongisvágur. There are cairns, which people can follow. Before the tunnel came in 1963 the path along the cairns was the only way to get from Hvalba to Trongisvágur and the part of the island which is south of Hvalba. There are now public toilets in Hvalba and in Sandvík.

== Coal Mines ==
In the mountains around the southbound tunnel brown coal has been extracted from mines since the 1770s. The coal was an important source of energy on the Faroe Islands until the end of World War II. A few miners are still extracting coal from the mines. Today there is only one active coal mine left. They closed down one of the older mines early in 2010 and started to excavate a new one in 2010.

== Pirates and "Turkargravir" ==
Pirates ravaged Hvalba, as other villages on Suðuroy, in the 17th century. In 1629 three North-African pirate ships attacked the village. When they left the village after the ravage two of the ships ran aground on some rocks and were shattered by the surf. Tradition says that more than 300 bodies washed ashore. By the shore, there is a place called ‘Turkargravir’. Here all the bodies were buried. 30 women and children were taken away to be sold as slaves in North Africa. On the Faroe Islands, a collection was organized to raise enough money to buy back the people. This was not successful and the people never returned to the islands.

== Sports ==
The local football team is Royn Hvalba (Bóltfelagið Royn).

== Gallery ==
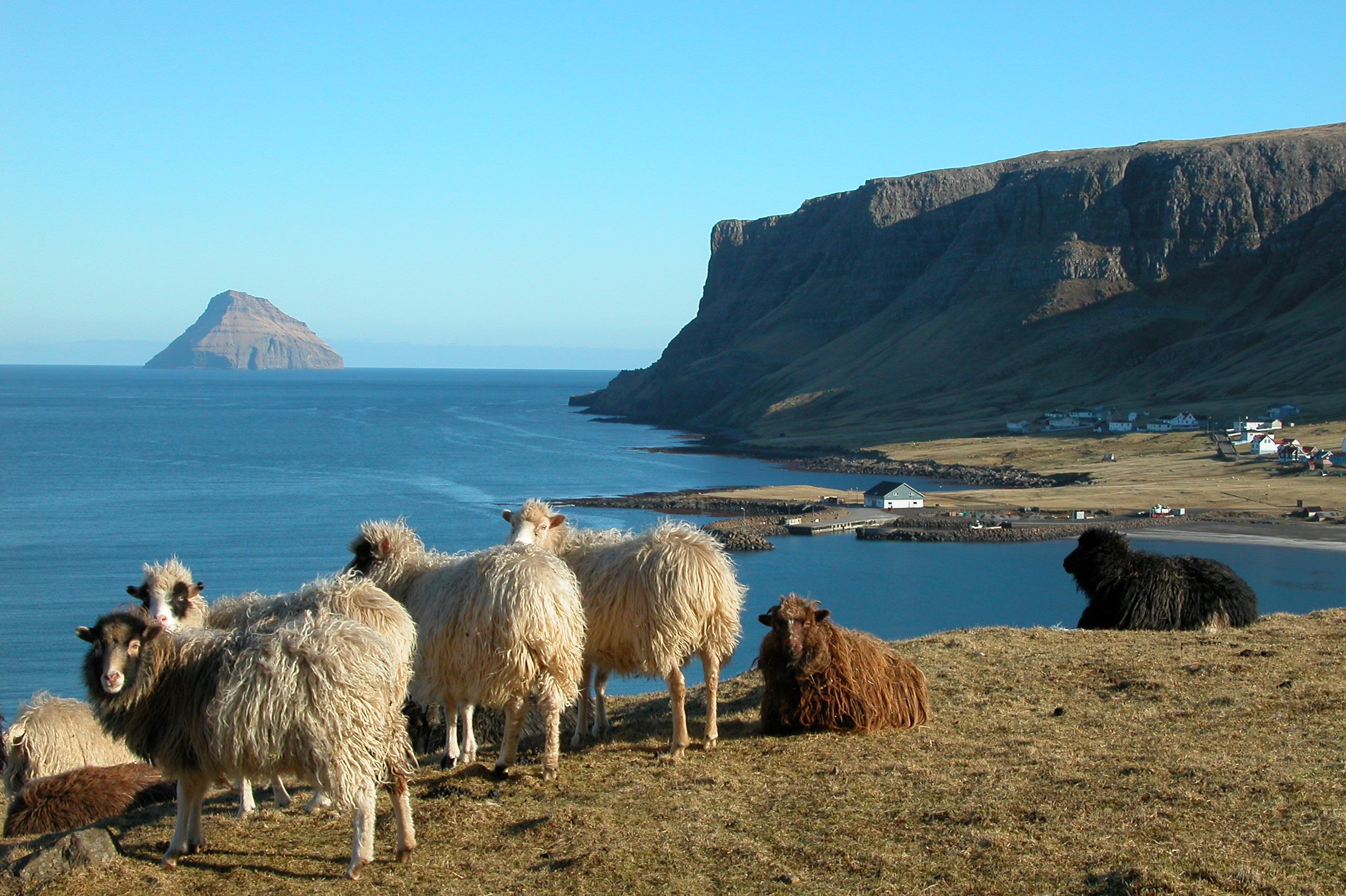
Hvalbiarfjørður, Lítla Dímun island in the background.

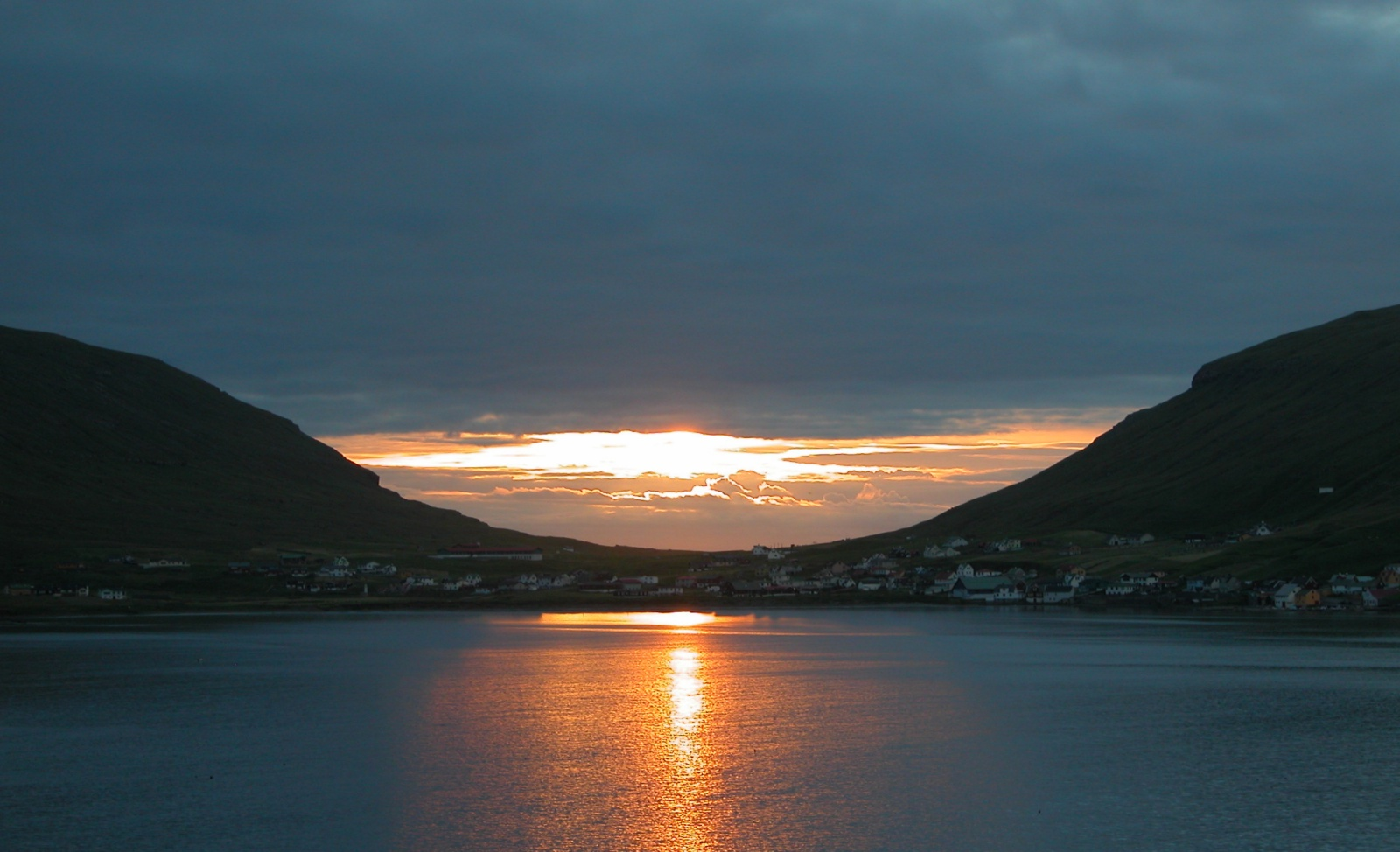
Sunset in Hvalba, seen from the sea.

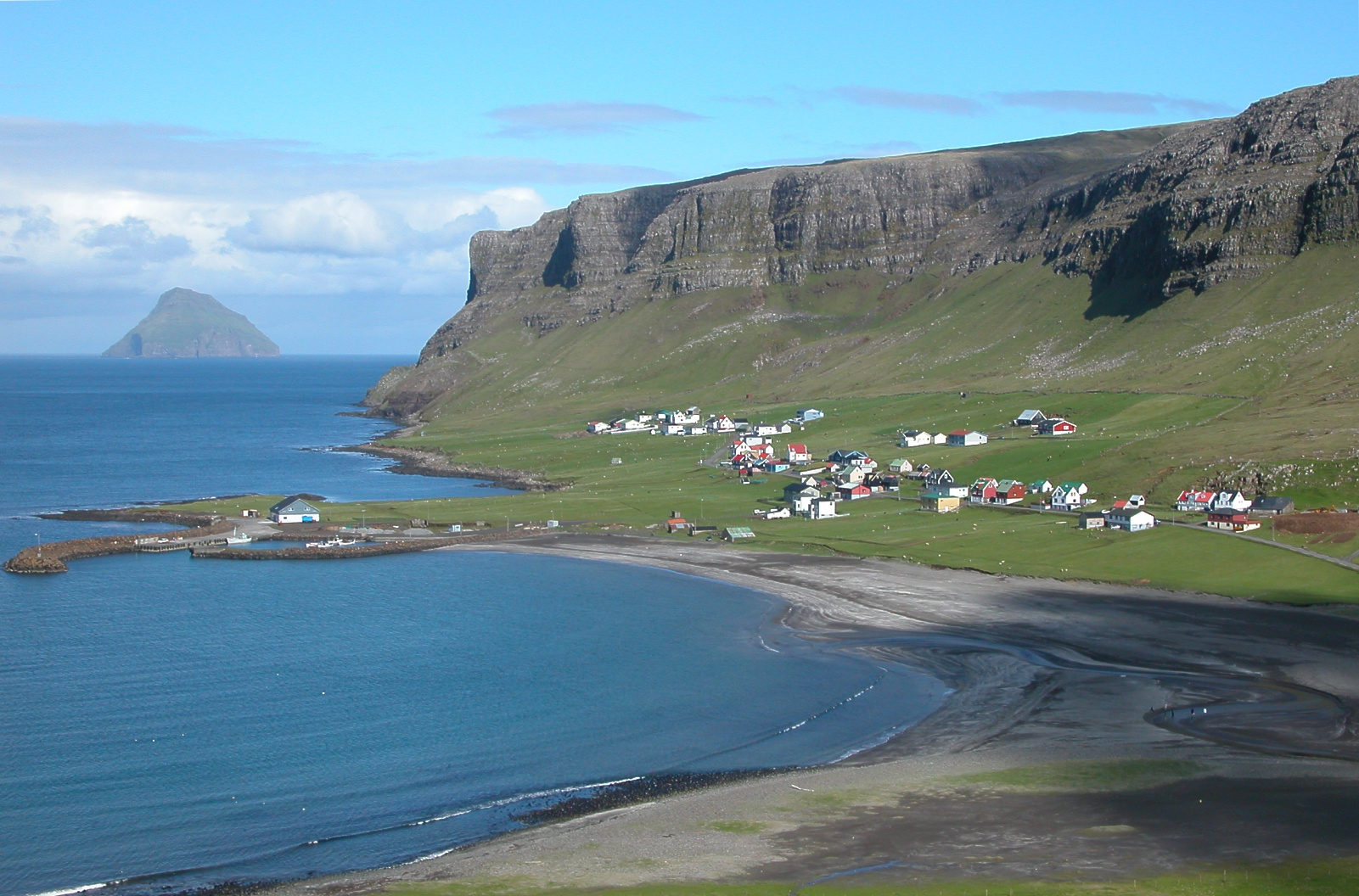
Nes at Hvalba at noon

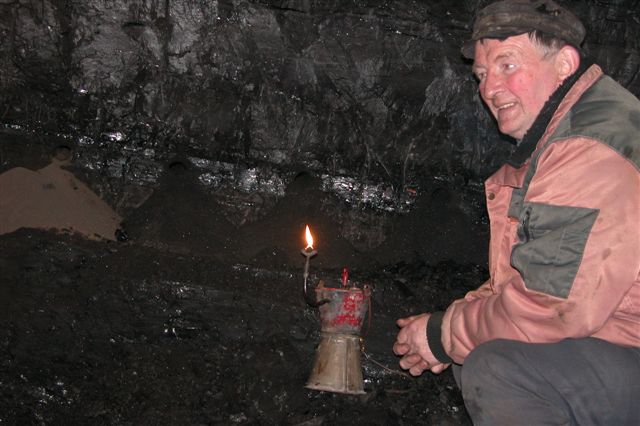
The coalmines south of Hvalba

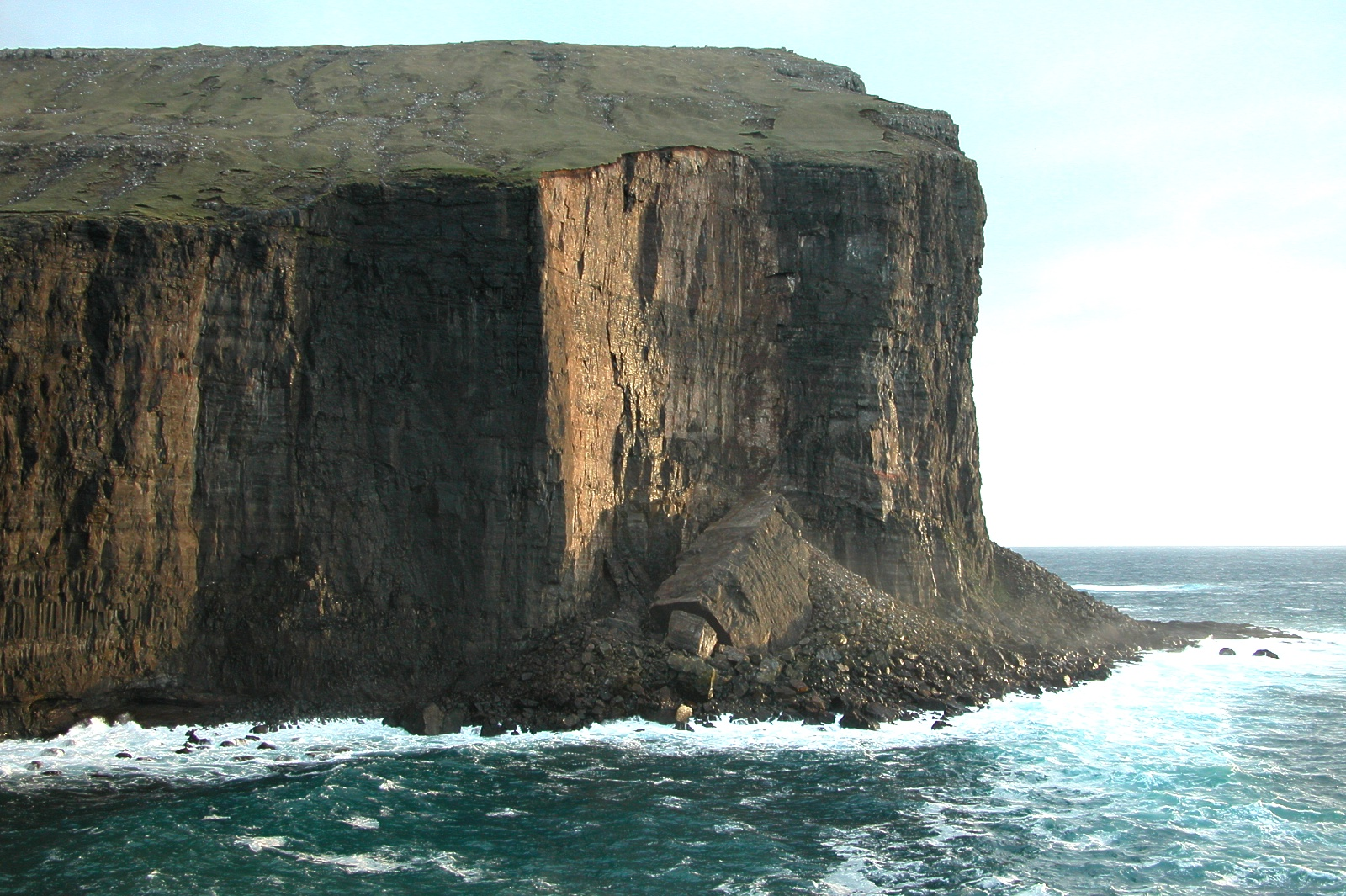
Norðbergseiði, the northern eidi of Hvalba.

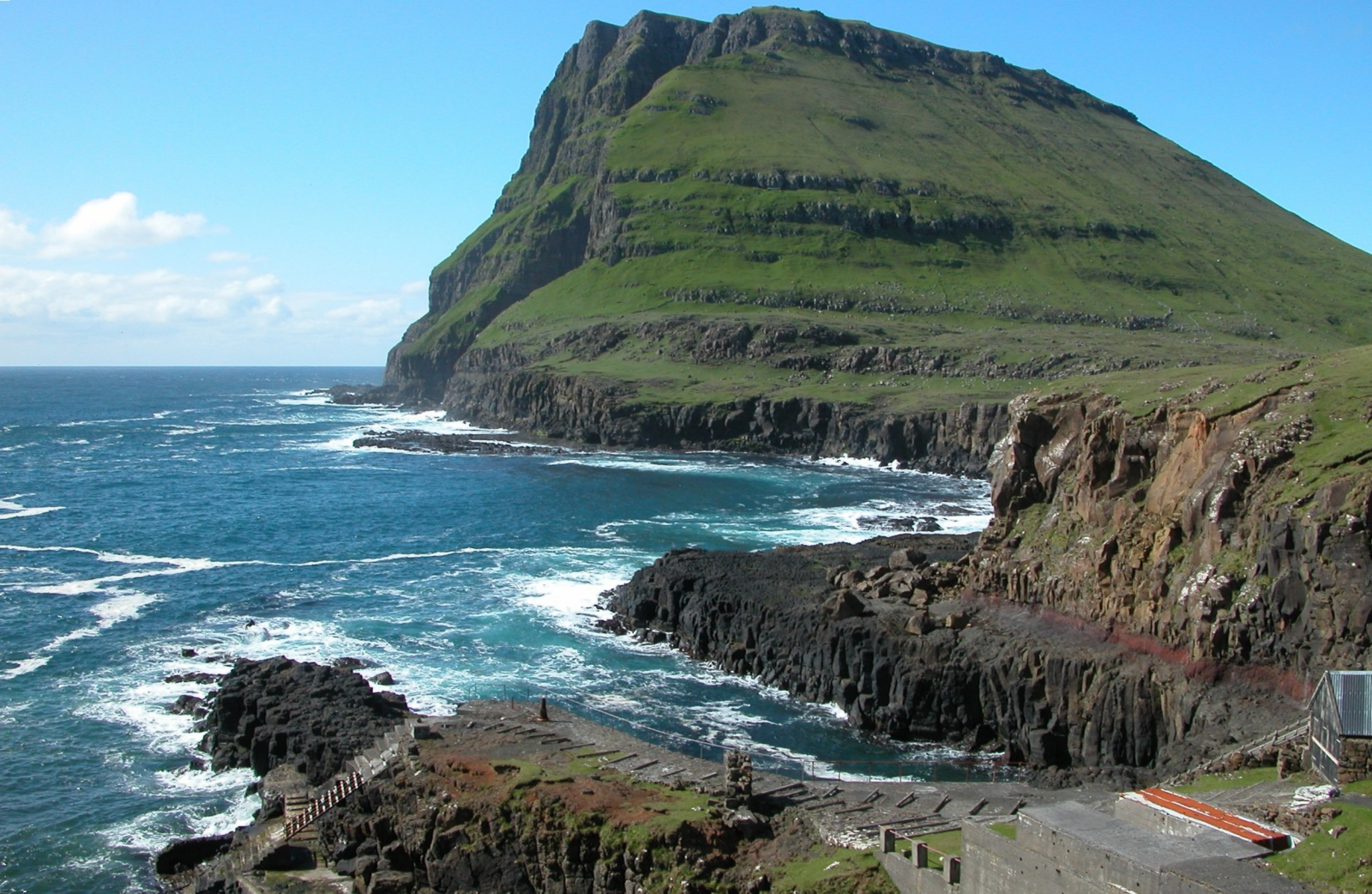
Hvalbiareiði, the southern eidi of Hvalba and Grímsfjall (mountain).

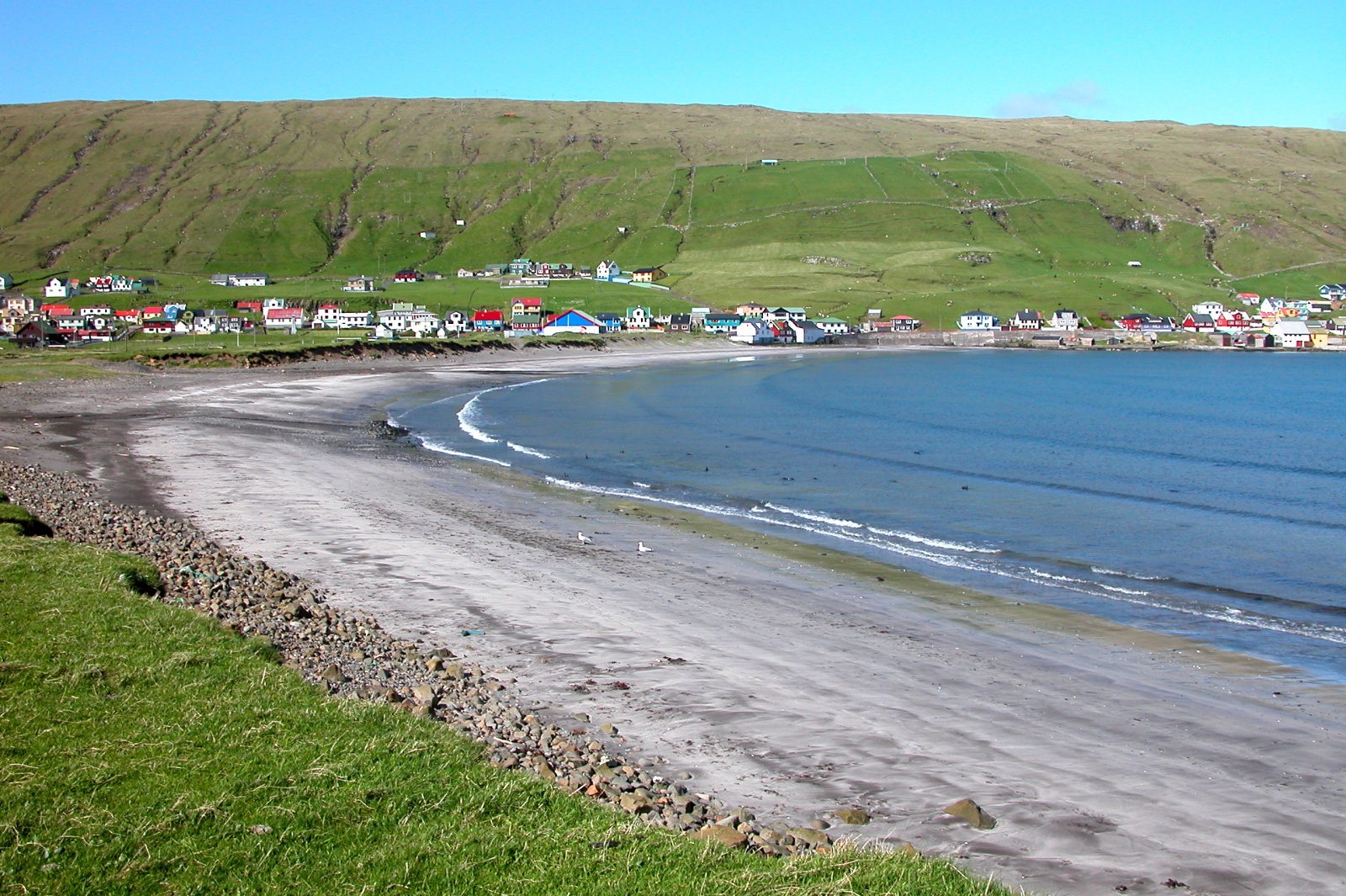
The sandy beach of Hvalba.

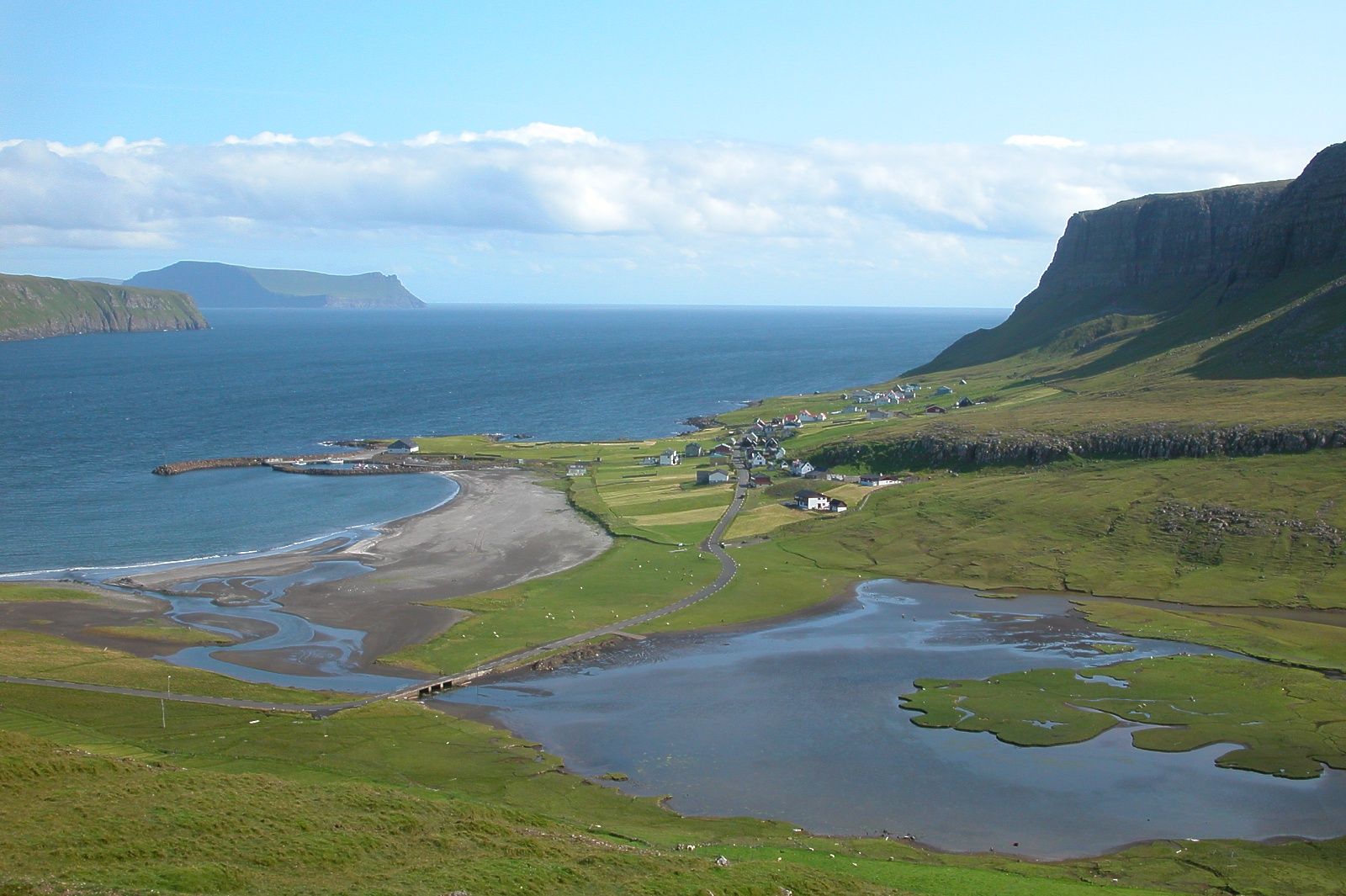
The sandy beach of Nes at Hvalba, view to Stóra Dímun (island).

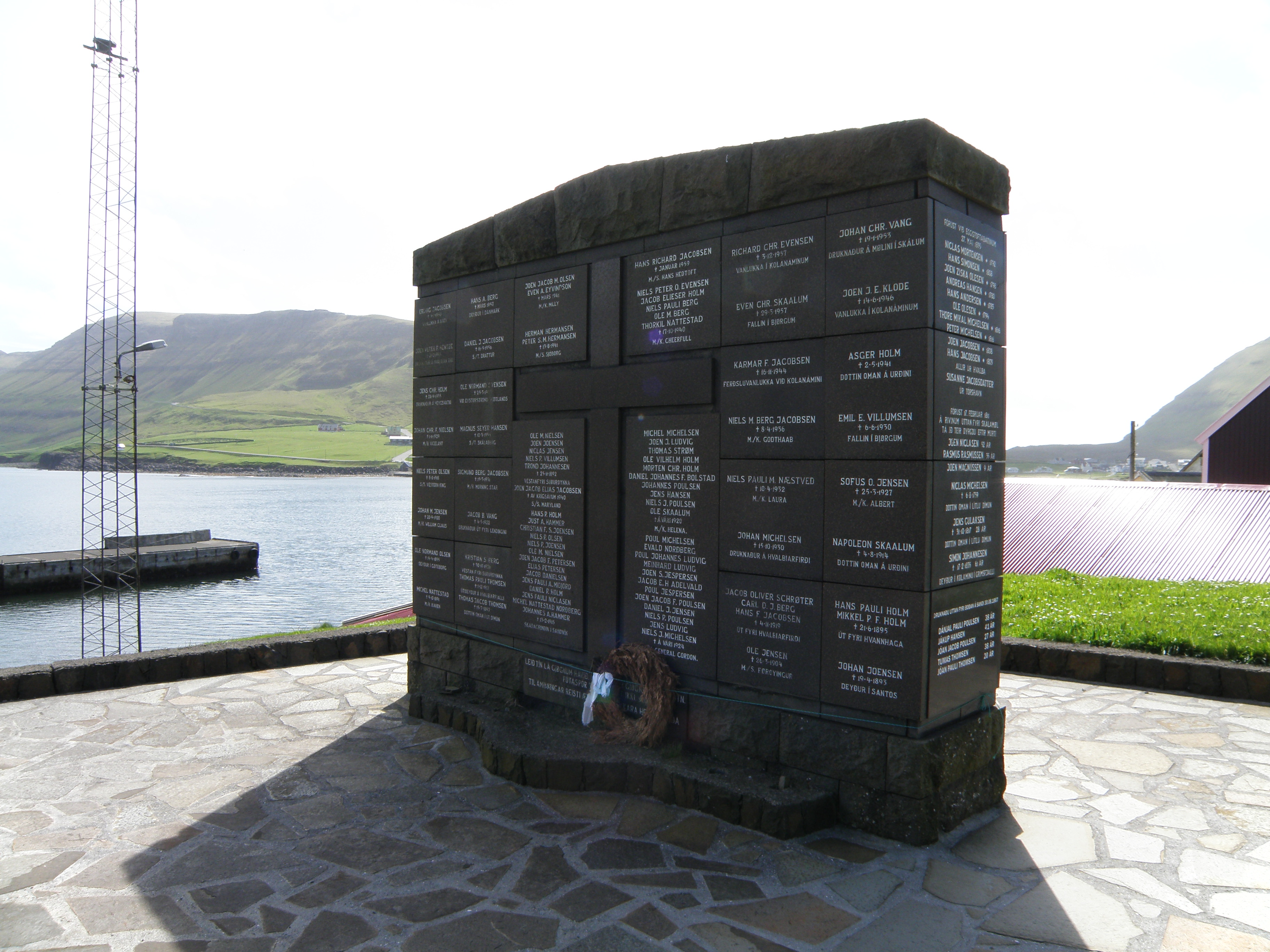
Memorial in Hvalba in memory of people lost at sea and people who died in other accidents i.e. in the coal mines and by falling down from Lítla Dímun or a cliff near Hvalba.

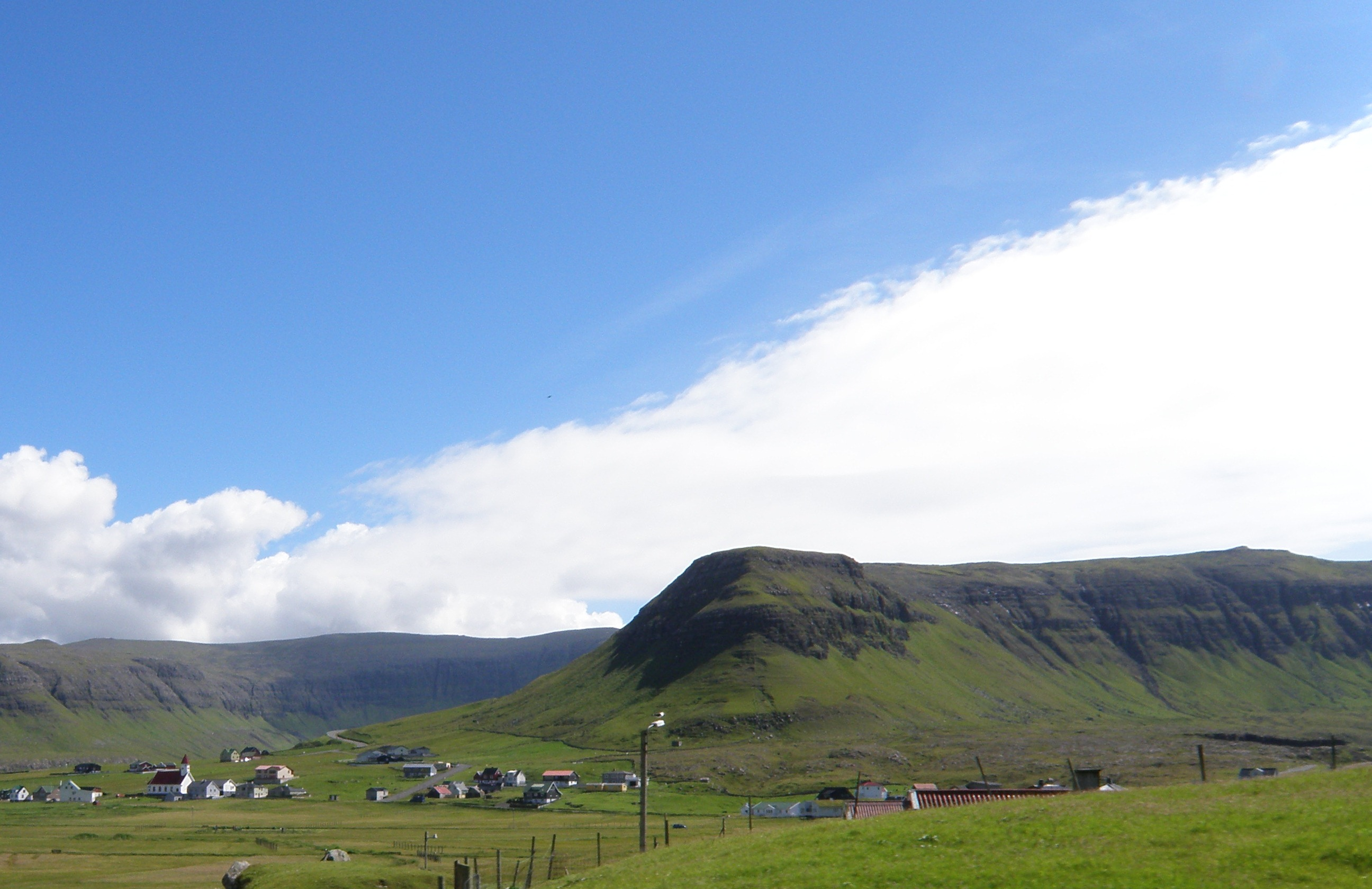
Prestfjall (mountain) and Hvalba.

== See also ==
- List of towns in the Faroe Islands
