= Sandsvatn =

Largest lake on the island of Sandoy, Faroe Islands

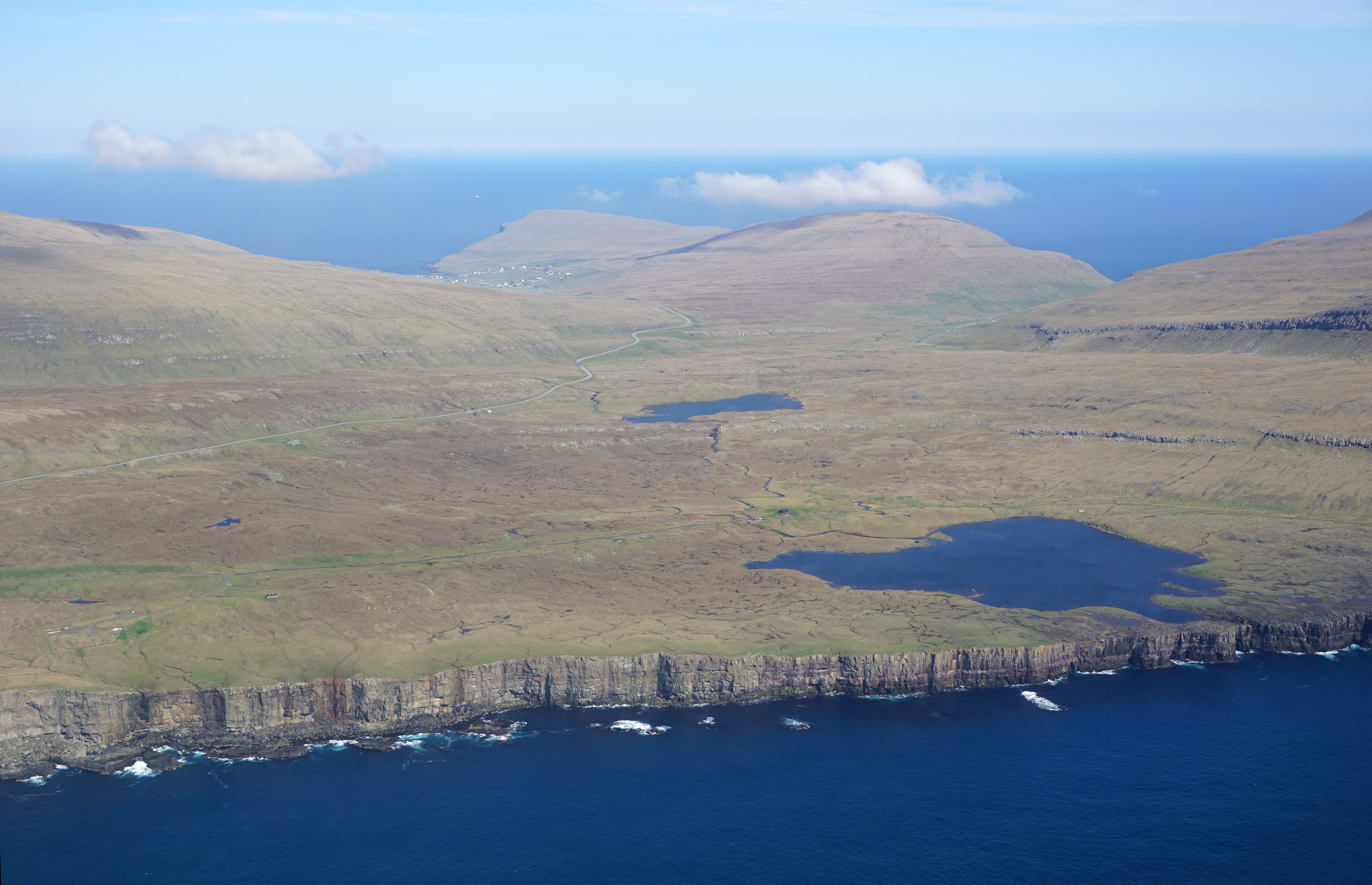

- Location within Denmark Faroe Islands
- Location: Sandoy, Faroe Islands
- Coordinates: 61°51′N 6°49′W
- Basin countries: Denmark
- Surface area: 80 ha (200 acres)

The Sandsvatn is the largest lake on the island of Sandoy and the third largest in the Faroe Islands, measuring 0.8 km^{2} with a depth of 5 metres. It is situated in a valley between Skopun and Sandur, just north of the latter on Road 30. At the northern end of the lake are the island's school centre and a copse (plantation) which was badly damaged by a 1988 hurricane.

The lake used to be rich in trout, lake trout and salmon. It has been called an "interesting" lake for birdwatching.
