= Lake Toftir =

Lake on the island of Eysturoy in the Faroe Islands

- Toftavatn (Faroese)
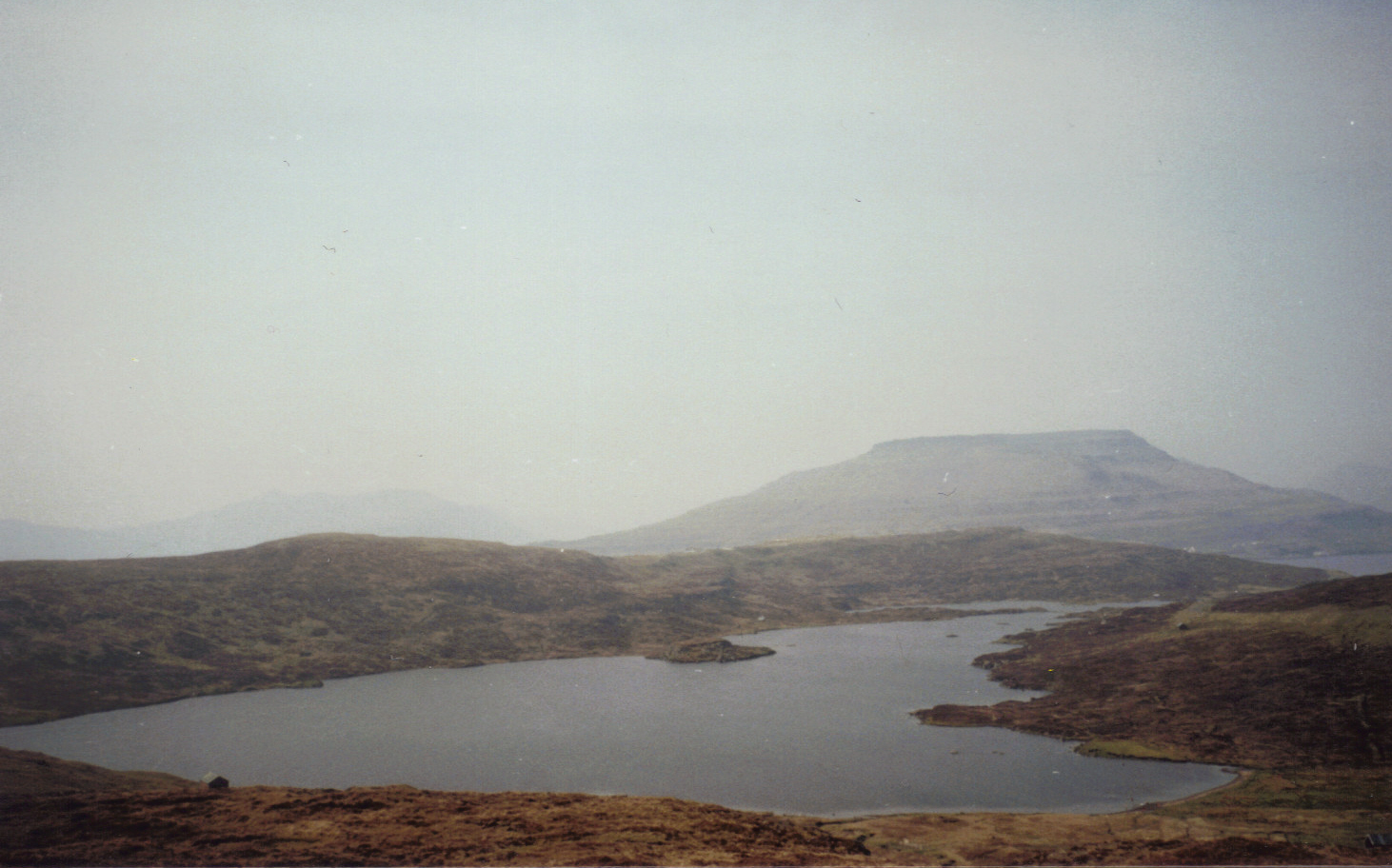
- Lake Toftir

- Location within Denmark Faroe Islands
- Location: Near Toftir, Faroe Islands
- Coordinates: 62°05′44.048″N 6°42′58.813″W
- Basin countries: Faroe Islands
- Surface area: 51 ha (130 acres)

Lake Toftir (Faroese: Toftavatn) is a lake on the island of Eysturoy in the Faroe Islands.

Lake Toftir is located between the villages of Toftir and Rituvík. It is the fourth-largest natural lake in the Faroe Islands and it measures 51 hectares (130 acres). The lake is noted for its rich bird life.
