= Stóravatn =

Lake in Sandoy, Faroe Islands

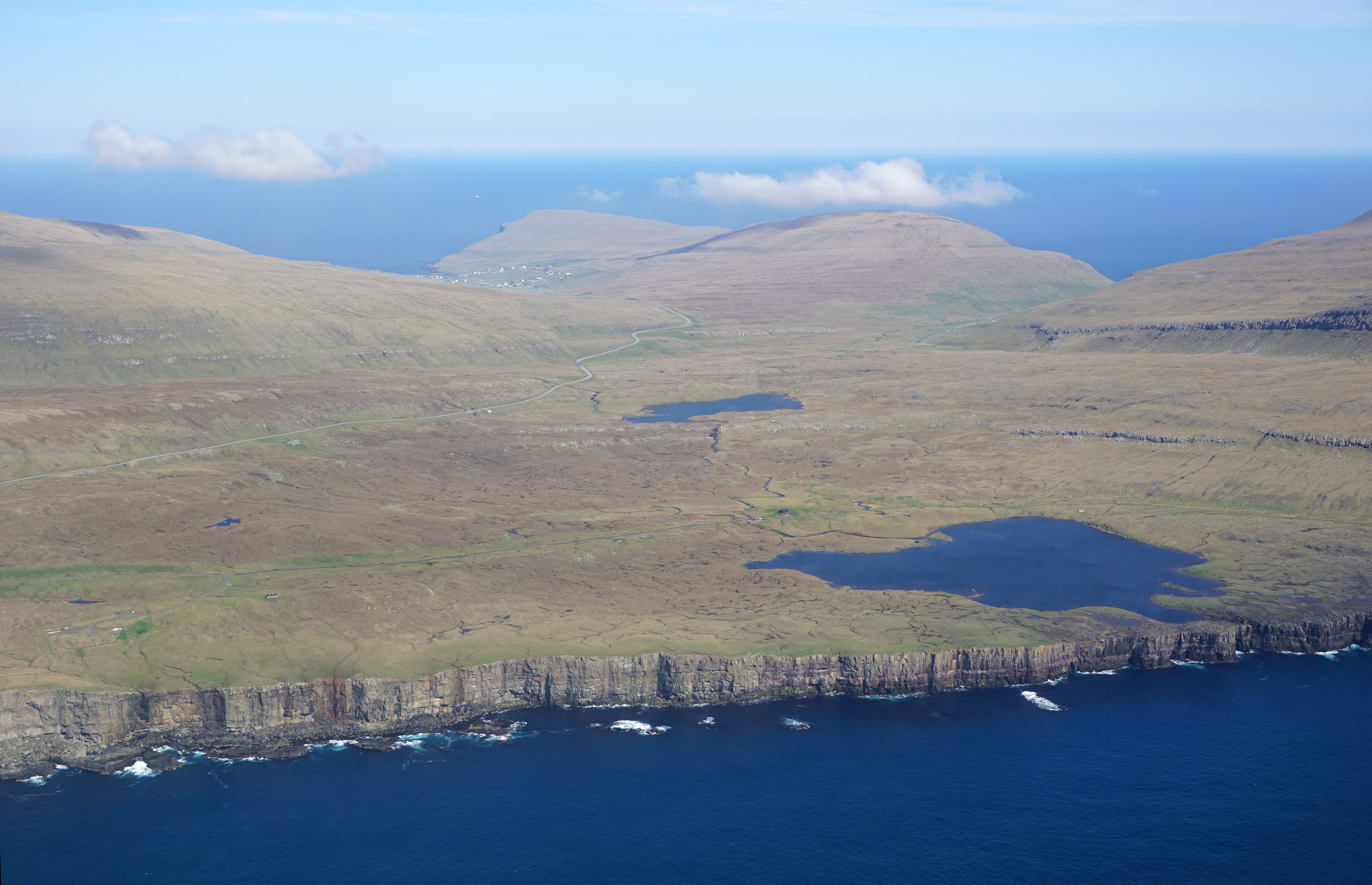
- Stóravatn with Lítlavatn in the background

- Location within Denmark Faroe Islands
- Location: Sandoy, Faroe Islands
- Coordinates: 61°48′59″N 6°45′15″W
- Basin countries: (Faroe Islands)
- Surface area: .15 ha (0.37 acres)

Stóravatn is a lake in Sandoy, Faroe Islands. The lake is located just south of the village Sandur, which is located on the south coast of Sandoy. The lake is 0.15 km^{2} and is among the 10 largest lakes in the Faroe Islands.
