= List of tunnels of the Faroe Islands =

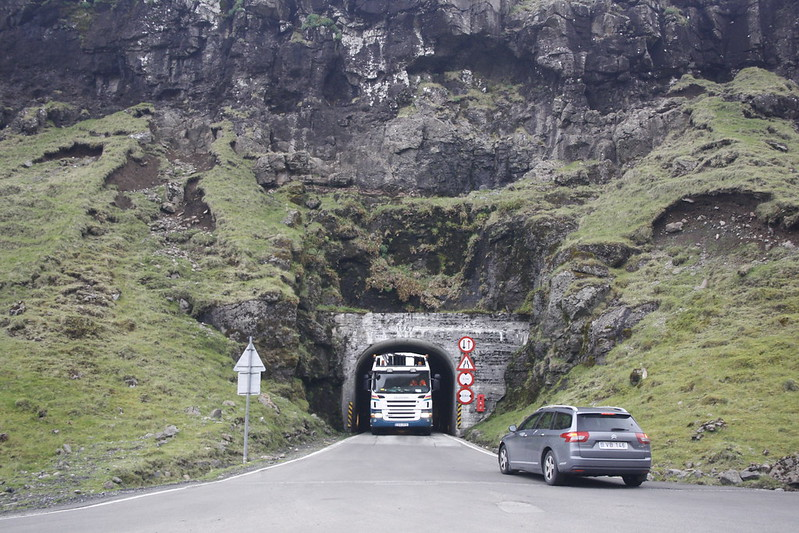
The old Árnafjarðartunnilin closed to traffic in 2024. Pictured is the former entrance, now fenced off, in Árnafjørður. Several similar tunnels remain in use.

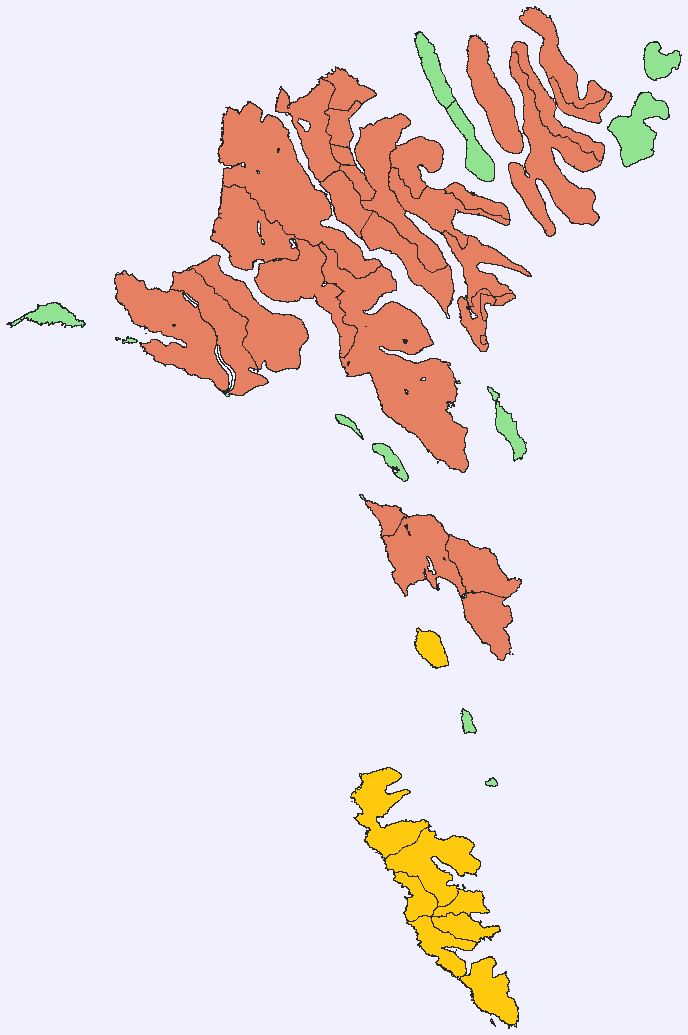
Red: Islands of the so-called Mainland connected by road (bridge, dam or tunnel), as of December 2023. Yellow: Islands that would be connected with the Suðuroyartunnilin. Green: Islands accessible only by water or air.

Tunnels and bridges are an important part of the Faroese transportation network.

== Road tunnels ==
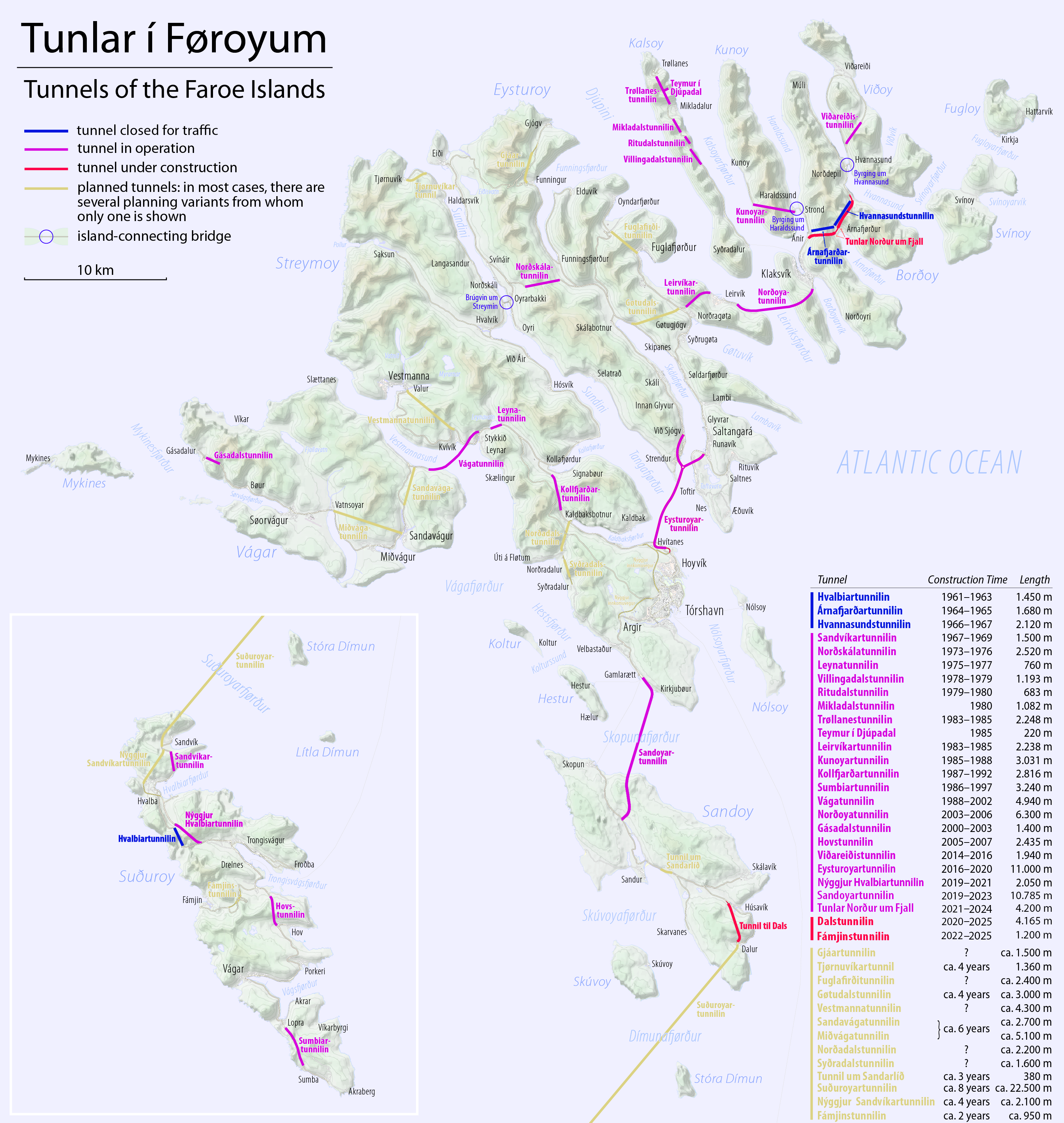
Locations of the tunnels

This list shows the Faroese tunnels, listed by age:

Tunnel	Year	Length m | ft		Connects	Island(s)	Notes
Gamli Hvalbiartunnilin	1963	1,450	4,760	Hvalba and Trongisvágur	Suðuroy	Closed to traffic since 2021.
Gamli Árnafjarðartunnilin	1965	1,680	5,510	Ánir, Klaksvík and Árnafjørður	Borðoy	Closed to traffic since 2024.
Gamli Hvannasundstunnilin	1967	2,120	6,960	Árnafjørður and Hvannasund/Norðdepil	Borðoy	Closed to traffic since 2024
Sandvíkartunnilin	1969	1,500	4,900	Sandvík and Hvalba	Suðuroy	Single lane with passing places, unlit.
Norðskálatunnilin	1976	2,520	8,270	Norðskáli and the valley of Millum Fjarða	Eysturoy	First two-lane tunnel. First road connection between Southern Eysturoy and Northern Eysturoy. Replaced the Hósvík-Selatrað ferry crossing.
Leynartunnilin	1977	760	2,490	Leynar and the valley of Kollafjarðardalur	Streymoy	Replaced an avalanche prone road.
Villingardalstunnilin	1979	1,193	3,914	The villages of Mikladalur and Húsar	Kalsoy	Southernmost of the five Kalsoy tunnels.
Ritudalstunnilin	1980	683	2,241	The villages of Mikladalur and Húsar	Kalsoy	One of the five Kalsoy tunnels. Single lane with passing places, unlit.
Mikladalstunnilin	1980	1,082	3,550	The villages of Mikladalur and Húsar	Kalsoy	One of the five Kalsoy tunnels. Single lane with passing places, unlit.
Trøllanestunnilin	1985	2,248	7,375	The villages of Trøllanes and Mikladalur	Kalsoy	Northernmost of the five Kalsoy tunnels. Single lane with passing places, unlit. Replaced a footpath, post boat service and helicopter service (1983-1985).
Teymur í Djúpadal	1979–85	220	720	The Trøllanestunnilin and the uninhabited valley of Djúpidalur	Kalsoy	One of the five Kalsoy tunnels. Effectively a branch of the Trøllanestunnilin to enable road access to pastures. Single lane, unlit.
Leirvíkartunnilin	1985	2,238	7,343	Leirvík and Gøta	Eysturoy	Replaced a cliffside road that now is a touristic route.
Kunoyartunnilin	1988	3,031	9,944	Kunoy and Haraldssund	Kunoy	Single lane with passing places, unlit. Replaced a ferry crossing.
Kollafjarðartunnilin	1992	2,816	9,239	Kollafjørður and Kaldbaksbotnur	Streymoy	Offers an alternative to the Oyrarvegurin mountain road, which is prone to icing and wind gusts in winter.
Sumbiartunnilin	1997	3,240	10,630	Sumba and Lopra	Suðuroy	Replaces a mountain pass that is now a tourist route.
Vágatunnilin	2002	4,940	16,210	Leynar and Fútaklett	Streymoy and Vágar	The first undersea tunnel. Replaced the Vestmanna-Vágar ferry.
Gásadalstunnilin	2006	1,445	4,741	Gásadalur and Bøur	Vágar	Single lane with passing places. Replaced the footpath and helicopter service.
Norðoyatunnilin	2006	6,186	20,295	Klaksvík and Leirvík	Eysturoy and Borðoy	Replaced the Leirvík-Klaksvík and Leirvík-Kalsoy-Klaksvík ferry.
Hovstunnilin	2007	2,435	7,989	Øravík and Hov	Suðuroy	Replaced the cliffside road that now is a touristic route.
Viðareiðistunnilin	2016	1,939	6,362	Viðareiði with Hvannasund	Viðoy	Replaced the coastal road, which is prone to landslides and avalanches, but remains open as a touristic route.
Eysturoyartunnilin	2020	11,250	36,910	Runavík and Strendur with Tórshavn	Streymoy and Eysturoy	Under Sundini and Skálafjørður. The tunnel has shortened the travel distance from Tórshavn to Runavík/Strendur from 55 kilometres to 17 kilometres. The 64-minute drive has been shortened to 17 minutes. The tunnel has the world's first under-sea roundabout at mid-bay.
Nýggi Hvalbiartunnilin	2021	2,524	8,281	Hvalba and Trongisvágur	Suðuroy	Dual lane, lit. Replaces the Old Hvalbiartunnilin from 1963.
Sandoyartunnilin	2023	10,785	35,384	Traðardalur and Gamlarætt	Streymoy and Sandoy	The tunnel starts just above the port of Gamlarætt and ends Traðardalur between Skopun and Sandur. The tunnel opened on 21 December 2023.
Nýggi Árnafjarðartunnilin	2024	1,965	6,447	Klaksvík, Ánir and Árnafjørður	Borðoy	First of the two new Tunlarnir norður um Fjall (also known as Borðoyartunlarnir). Construction commenced in February 2021, the drilling itself started in November 2021. Drilling finished on 8 November 2022.
Nýggi Hvannasundstunnilin	2024	2,246	7,369	Árnafjørður and Norðdepil	Borðoy	Second of the two new Tunlarnir norður um Fjall (also known as Borðoyartunlarnir). Construction started in November 2021 Drilling finished on 16 November 2022.
Fámjinstunnilin	2025	1,200	3,900	Øravík with Fámjin	Suðuroy	Road access to Fámjin has been prone to fierce winds and icing. Construction of access roads commenced 25 July 2022 while drilling started on 16 November 2022. The tunnel opened on 25 June 2025.
Húsareynstunnilin	2025	1,705	5,594	Within Tórshavn, between Marknagil and Villingardal (near Hoyvík).	Streymoy	Part of the Havnarvegur bypass between Tórshavn (near Hotel Føroyar), Hoyvík and Hvítanes, opened on 6 July 2025
Dalstunnilin	2026	2,219	7,280	Dalur with Húsavík	Sandoy	To replace the narrow cliffside road. Drilling commenced 5 November 2020. On 17 November 2022 the halfway mark was passed. Opened to traffic on 18 July 2026.
Total (including closed tunnels)		77,620	254,660		9 islands	4 sub-sea tunnels in operation, 21 on-island tunnels in operation, and 3 on-island tunnels closed to traffic.

== Bridges and causeways ==
This list shows the longest Faroese bridges and causeways, listed by age:

Bridge	Year	Length m | ft		Connects	Island(s)	Comments
Brúgvin um Streymin	1973	220	720	Oyrarbakki/Norðskáli and Nesvík	Streymoy and Eysturoy	Concrete bridge. Replaced the ferry crossing from Nesvík to Oyrarbakki.
Byrging um Hvannasund	1975	220	720	Hvannasund and Norðdepil	Borðoy and Viðoy	Causeway. Replaced post and milk boat services.
Byrging um Haraldssund	1986	350	1,150	Haraldssund and Strond	Borðoy and Kunoy	Causeway. Replaced post and milk boat services. Causeway between Kunoy (left) and Borðoy (right).
Brúgvin um Sandá	2016	140	460	Argir and Tórshavn	Streymoy	The second longest bridge in the country.

== Tunnels under construction ==
Tunnel	Year	Approx. length m | ft	Connects	Island	Comments

== Tunnels closed to traffic ==
Tunnel	Year of opening	Year of closure	Length m | ft		Connects	Island	Comments
Gamli Hvalbiartunnilin	1963	2021	1,450	4,760	Hvalba and Trongisvágur	Suðuroy	First tunnel in the country and also the first to be replaced by a new tunnel.
Gamli Árnafjarðartunnilin	1965	2024	1,680	5,510	Ánir, Klaksvík and Árnafjørður	Borðoy	First of the two original Tunlarnir norður um Fjall (also known as Borðoyartunlarnir). Single lane with passing places, unlit.
Gamli Hvannasundstunnilin	1967	2024	2,120	6,960	Árnafjørður and Hvannasund/Norðdepil	Borðoy	Second of the two original Tunlarnir norður um Fjall (also known as Borðoyartunlarnir). Single lane with passing places, unlit.
Total closed			5,250	17,220			

In addition, there are custom-built tunnels in Fuglafjørður used as storage space for local fishing companies. All are cul-de-sacs and closed to the public. The newest tunnels open in 2025 and measure 899 and 985 meters in length.

== Planned and proposed tunnels ==
Tunnel	Year	Approx. length m | ft		Connects	Island(s)	Comments
Suðuroyartunnilin	2036+	24,297 or 28,145	79,715 or 92,339	Sandur or Skarvanes and Sandvík	Sandoy and Suðuroy	The suggested route consists of a single long tube between Djúpadalur and Sandvík, with a branch to Skúvoy (1550 metres, included in the total length). The project would take 10.1 years to construct, excluding upgrades of access roads on Sandoy and a new Sandvíkartunnilin, which will be part of the overall project. Alternative routes are still being discussed.
Tjørnuvíkartunnilin	unknown	2,300	7,500	Tjørnuvík with Haldórsvík	Streymoy	To replace the narrow cliffside road. The route will be finalised in 2025 and construction would start in 2026.
Vestmannatunnilin	unknown	4,200 or 6,200	13,800 or 20,300	Kvívík and Vestmanna	Streymoy	To replace the cliffside road, prone to icing, rockslides and windgusts. The tunnel would be combined with a tunnel for powerlines from Vestmanna's hydropower station, and would start tunnelling after the Tjørnuvíkartunnilin is complete. The estimated costs are between 600 and 900 million DKK.
Gøtudalstunnilin	unknown	0	0	Skálafjørður or and Norðragøta	Eysturoy	To offer an alternative to the Gøtueiði mountain pass in between Søldarfjørður and Syðrugøta, which is prone to icing and windgusts. The original plans stated construction between 2022 and 2025, but in 2025 it was announced that detailed plans will start soon, without a precise date.
Tunnilin á Vagum	unknown	0	0	Vágatunnilin and Vatnsoyrar	Vágar	A bypass for through-traffic between Sørvágur, the airport and Streymoy, bypassing Mið- and Sandavágur. Construction planned 2027 or later.
Gjáartunnilin	unknown	0	0	Gjógv with Funningur	Eysturoy	To replace the narrow mountain pass, prone to icing in winter.

== Operators ==
Public works authority Landsverk operates the national road network, excluding the four sub-sea toll tunnels. These tunnels are each operated by its own state-owned limited company, but the four companies are brought together under a single brand and organisation, Tunnil p/F. This company administers the tolls, which charged are via number plate recognition and collected at petrol stations or car rental companies upon return of the car. Reduced fares are available for vehicles with a subscription (in Faroese: hald). A 2022 poll suggested continued support for toll charges.

Tórshavn Municipality owns and operates the Sandá Bridge and Húsareynstunnilin, which is formally a municipal road, though functionally part of the national highway network.

== See also ==
- Transport in the Faroe Islands
