= Transport in the Faroe Islands =

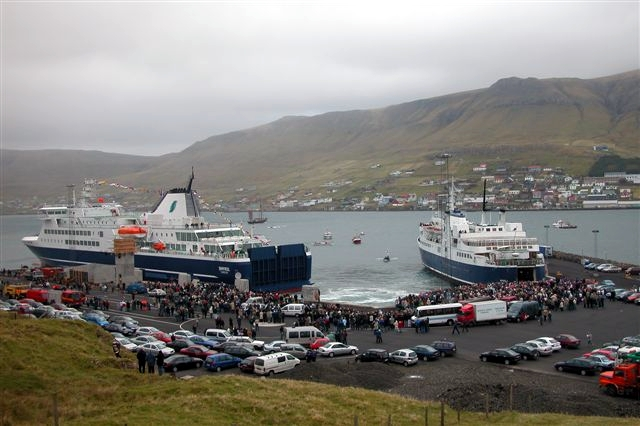
Ferries of Strandfaraskip Landsins, with the new vessel MS Smyril on the left

The Faroe Islands is served by an internal transport system based on roads, ferries, and helicopters. As of the 1970s, the majority of the population centres of the Faroe Islands have been joined to a single road network, connected by bridges and tunnels.

International transport, both for passengers and freight, remains difficult due to high costs, long distances, and bad weather, especially during the winter. Exporting domestically produced goods is thus expensive; this limits the development of a commodity-based economy.

== History ==
The general history of the Faroese transportation system can be divided into four periods:

=== Before 1900 ===
During this first period, transportation was rather primitive; it consisted of row boats, walking, and, in certain places, horse transport (for the upper class). Boats were used for transport between villages, even on the same island, as land transport was difficult due to the steep mountains.

=== 1900 to the end of World War II ===
The second period commenced in the late-19th century, when ferry connections began to emerge. The ferries were largely private initiatives, but they increasingly came to be operated by the public sector. This was supplemented by an emerging culture of automobiles. After World War II, a large part of the Faroe Islands was accessible via ferries and automobiles; private buses and taxis operated as well.

=== The end of World War II to the 1970s ===
The third period was characterized by modernization. The introduction of the car ferry made it possible to drive between the various city centres of the country. It became possible to drive from the capital Tórshavn to Vágur and Tvøroyri in the south, to Fuglafjørður and Klaksvík in the north, and to the airport at Sørvágur in the west. Vágar Airport was built by the British during World War II; it was reopened as a civilian international airport in 1963. Additionally, the road network was further developed. Tunnels to distant valleys and firths such as Hvalba, Sandvík, and Norðdepil were constructed in the 1960s.

=== 1970s onwards ===
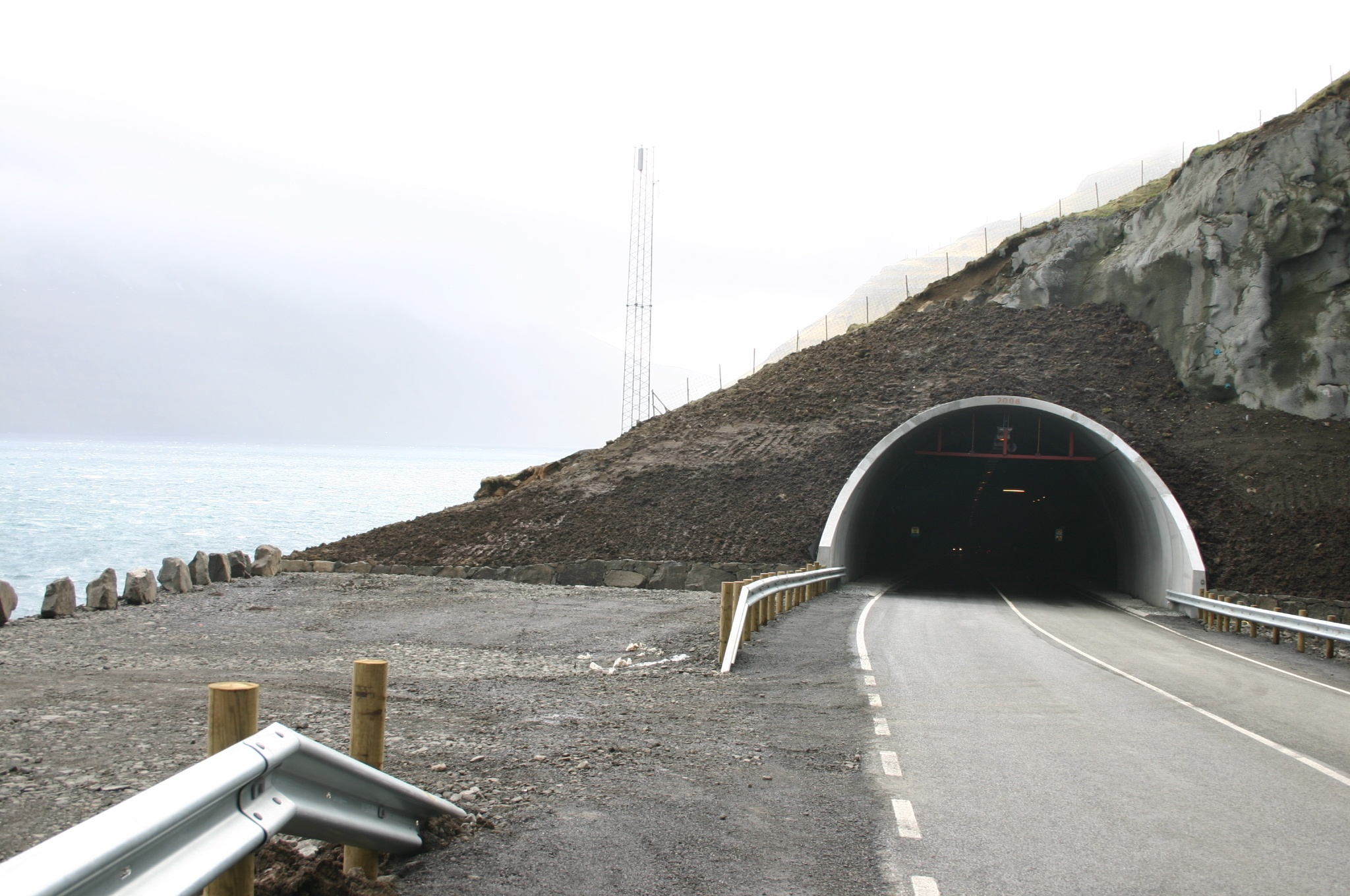
Entrance to the Norðoyatunnilin at Leirvík on Eysturoy

The fourth period saw the emergence of a "mainland" thanks to tunnels and bridges. In 1973 the Streymin Bridge, the first bridge between two Faroese islands, was established between Norðskáli on Eysturoy and Nesvík on Streymoy; in 1976 the new tunnel between Norðskáli and Eysturoy was completed. The Faroes' two largest islands were connected into what is now referred to as "Meginlandið", the Mainland. In 1975 the causeway between Viðoy and Borðoy was constructed, in 1986 a similar one between Borðoy and Kunoy was established, and in 1992 the capital Tórshavn was granted a first-class connection to the northern parts of the islands, creating the infrastructural prerequisites for a mobile society on the mainland.

The newest developments of the Faroese transportation network are the sub-sea tunnels. In 2002 the tunnel between Streymoy and Vágar—the latter is the airport island—was finished, and in 2006 the Norðoyatunnilin between Eysturoy and Borðoy was finished. In early 2014 all political parties of the Løgting agreed to the construction of two tunnels: Eysturoyartunnilin, a tunnel connecting Eysturoy and Streymoy, which was completed in 2020 and opened for traffic on 19 December 2020, and Sandoyartunnilin, a tunnel connecting Streymoy and Sandoy, which opened on 21 December 2023. The combined cost of the project is estimated at almost 3 billion DKK. It was the most expensive construction project in Faroese history. Eysturoyartunnilin has the world's first under-sea roundabout. Its three tubes are 7.1 km, 2.1 km and 1.8 km long, linked together by the roundabout. Sandoyartunnilin is 10.8 km long. Tolls are charged to drive through the four undersea tunnels, the others are free. More than 85% of the Faroese population is accessible by automobile.

==== Future ====
A tunnel between Sandoy and Suðuroy, named Suðuroyartunnilin, has been approved. The tunnel would be around 20–25 km long. When completed, 99% of the Faroes would be connected by road.

== Railways ==
There are no passenger railways on the Faroe Islands due to the difficult landscape, small population, and relatively short distances.

Two railways have operated on the islands. A tunnel and rail system supplied a NATO radar installation, now decommissioned, which previously existed on a mountaintop in the southern part of Streymoy Island. The Gjógv incline railway operates a freight service between the harbour and the village of Gjógv on Eysturoy island.

== Roads ==
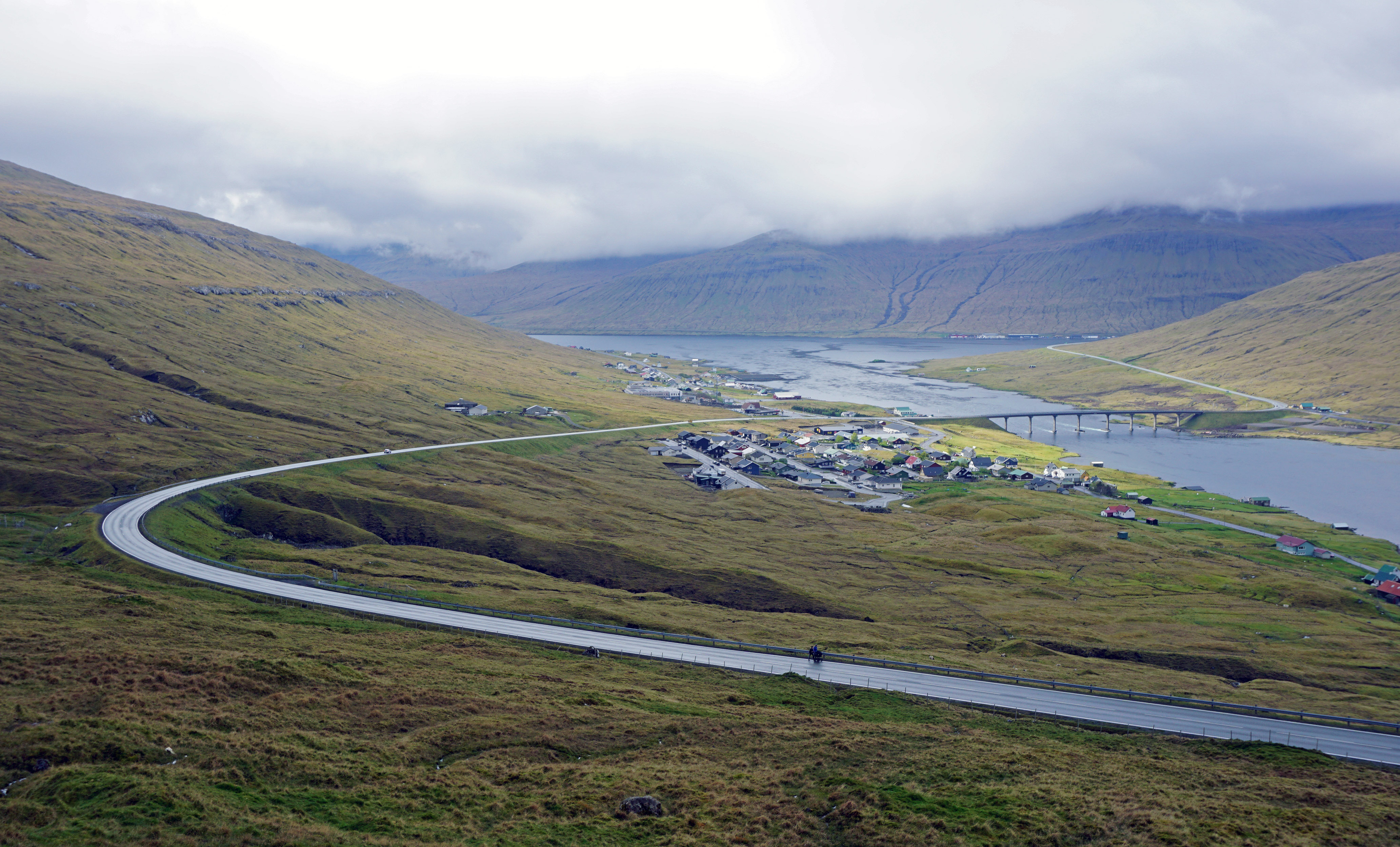
Streymin Bridge, connecting Streymoy and Eysturoy, was opened in 1973.

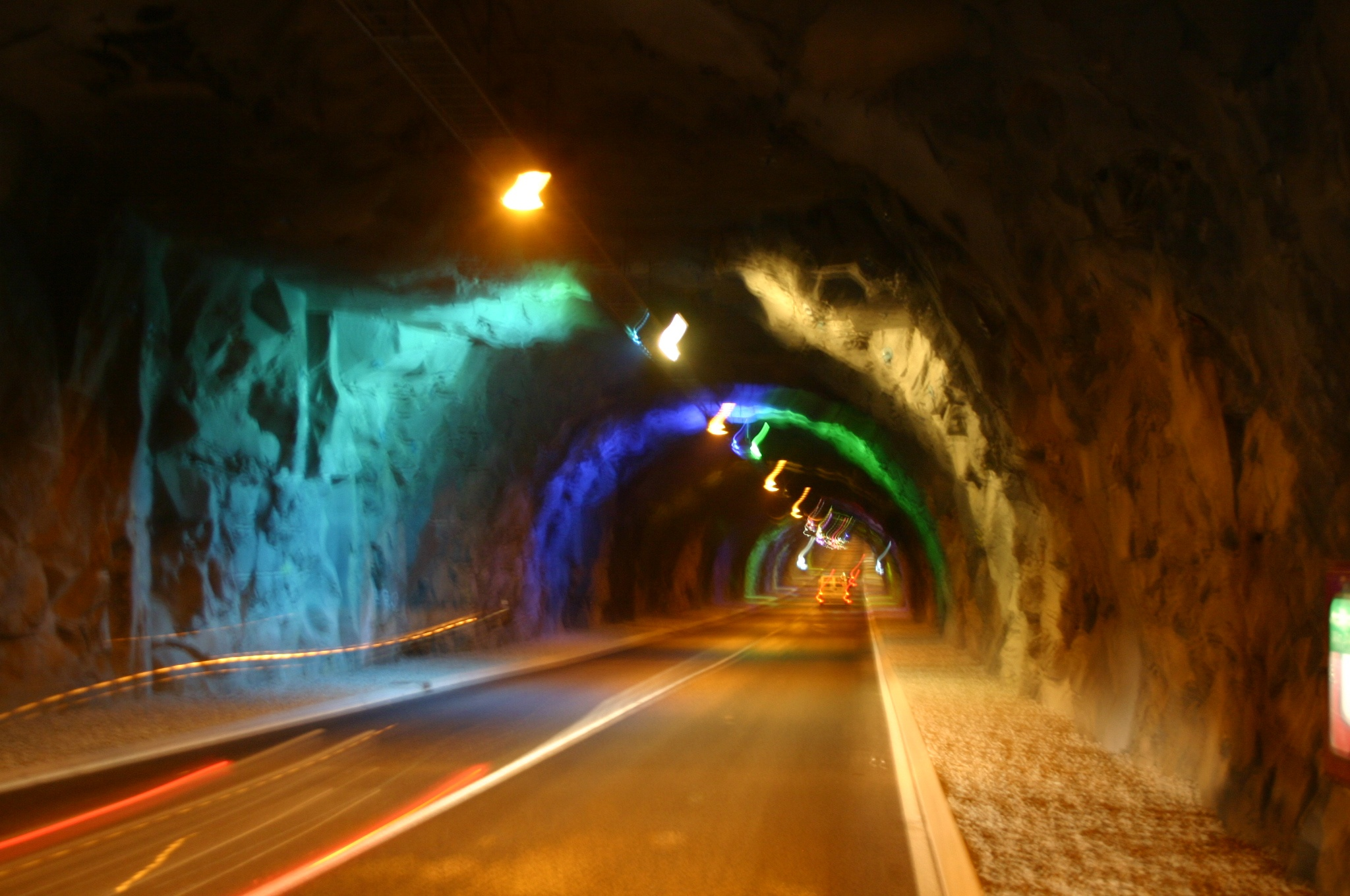
"Light Art" inside the Norðoyatunnilin

Roads have become the main method of transportation on the islands, replacing boats. In 2021, there were 16,289 petrol cars, 9,795 diesel cars, and 567 electric cars. Google Street View became available for some roads in November 2017, supplied by residents and sheep rather than Google cars.

=== Highways ===
total: 960 km (600 mi)

national highways: 460 km (290 mi)
local roads: 500 km (310 mi)

=== Bus services ===
The national bus network (Bygdaleiðir, Village routes) is operated by Strandfaraskip Landsins operating the characteristic blue buses. Most minibuses, buses and coaches in current service are built by either Volvo or Irisbus/Iveco. In 2024, they introduced their first Battery-Electric buses, the Iveco E-Way. The principal route is Tórshavn-Klaksvík (via the Norðoyatunnilin tunnel and Streymin Bridge). Although individual buses are generally owned by individuals or small companies, the timetables, fares, and levels of service are set by Strandfaraskip Landsins and the government.

The municipalities of Tórshavn, Klaksvík, Eysturkommuna and Sunda operate their own free-of-charge local services, usually referred to as Bussleiðin. Tórshavn's Bussleiðin has five routes and is operated by the Tórshavn municipality. Like Bygdaleiðir, the actual buses are privately owned, but contracted to Bussleiðin. Klaksvík's service commenced in 2014.

== Sea ==
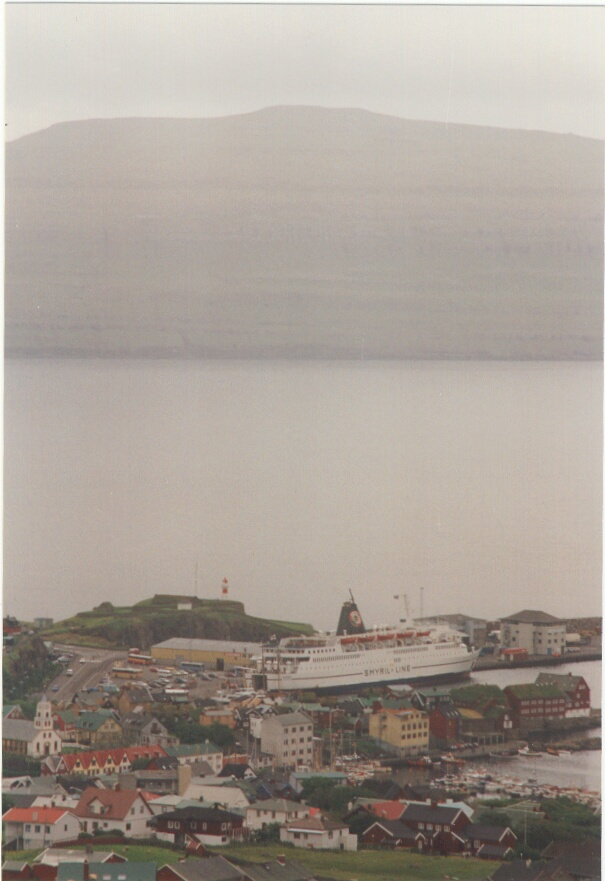
The Norröna of the Smyril Line at Tórshavn in 1997. This vessel has since been replaced by the new Norröna.

=== Ports and harbours ===
- Tórshavn
- Klaksvík
- Tvøroyri
- Vágur
- Vestmanna
- Kollafjørður
- Runavík
- Fuglafjørður
- Krambatangi
- Gamlarætt

=== Merchant marine ===
total: 6 ships (1,000 gross tonnage (GT) or over) totaling 22,853 GT/13,481 tonnes deadweight (DWT) (1999 est.)

ships by type:
- cargo ship 2,
- petroleum tanker 1,
- refrigerated cargo ship 1,
- roll-on/roll-off 1,
- short-sea passenger 1.

=== Ferries ===
The Faroese ferry company Strandfaraskip Landsins operates a network of ferries, in addition to the rural blue buses, called Bygdaleiðir (Villagelines). Their largest vessel is the Smyril, a roll-on/roll-off ferry which maintains the link between Tórshavn and the southern island, Suðuroy. This vessel entered service in 2005. Another ferry, Teistin, a roll-on-off ferry, maintains the link between the island of Sandoy and Streymoy; the ferry port on Streymoy is at Gamlarætt near Kirkjubøur and Velbastaður on the south-west coast of Streymoy. A sub-sea tunnel is under construction between Sandoy and Streymoy, it will open in 2023 according to the plan. After that there will not be need of a ferry between the two islands. The proposed Suðuroyartunnilin would also remove the ferry services to Skúvoy and Suðuroy.

Since the early 1980s, Smyril Line has operated a regular international passenger, car and freight service using a large, modern, multipurpose ferry, the Norröna. The weekly service links the Faroe Islands with Seyðisfjörður, Iceland, and Hirtshals, Denmark.

== Air ==
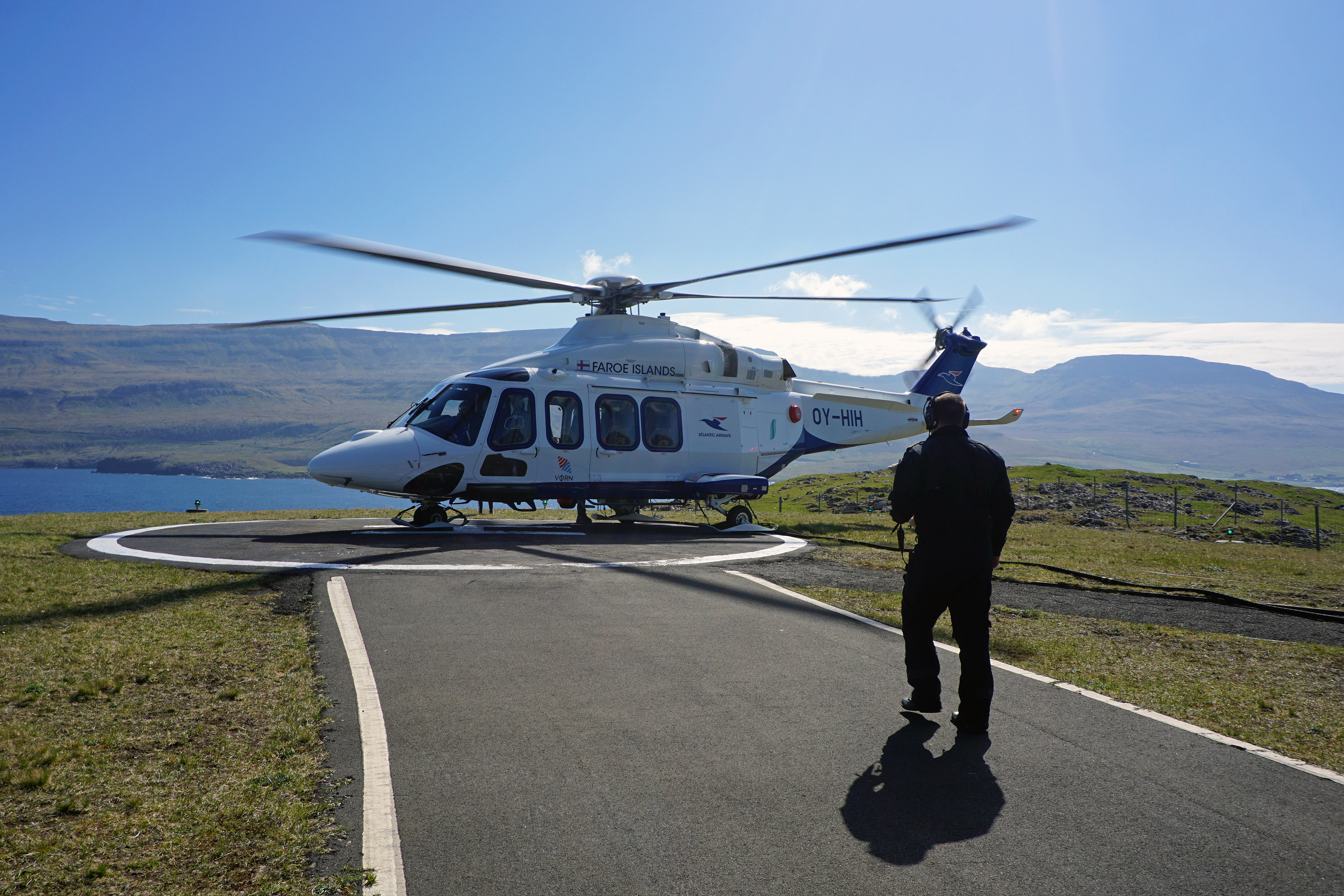
Atlantic Airways AgustaWestland AW139 at Froðba helicopter station.

Atlantic Airways is the national airline of the Faroe Islands, and has its operating base at Vágar Airport. It operates regular flights to Iceland, Denmark, Norway, and Scotland while there are also seasonal flights connecting the Faroe Islands with destinations including Barcelona, Mallorca, Lisbon, and Stewart International Airport, New York.

Originally state-owned, the airline has been partially privatised. The Government has plans to continue selling its remaining share in the airline. As a private company, Atlantic Airways continues to provide the Faroe Islands search and rescue capability, under contract to the government.

=== Airports ===
The Faroe Islands has only one commercial airport. Vágar Airport is located close to the village of Sørvágur, on the island of Vágar. It has a paved 1,799 m / 5,902 ft runway, and was originally built by British Royal Engineers during the Second World War. The main airlines operating regular scheduled flights are Atlantic Airways and Scandinavian Airlines. Other airlines operate charter flights.

=== Heliports ===
Helicopters provide domestic scheduled transportation, medical evacuation, and search & rescue activities.

There are public (passenger and freight) heliports at Froðba, Hattarvík, Kirkja, Klaksvík, Mykines, Skúvoy, Stóra Dímun, Svínoy, and Tórshavn (Boðanes). There are air ambulance heliports at Skopun and Tórshavn (hospital).

== See also ==
- Transport in Denmark
- Tunnels of the Faroes
- Smyril Line
- Strandfaraskip Landsins
- Faroese coast guard
