= Ánirnar =

- Village
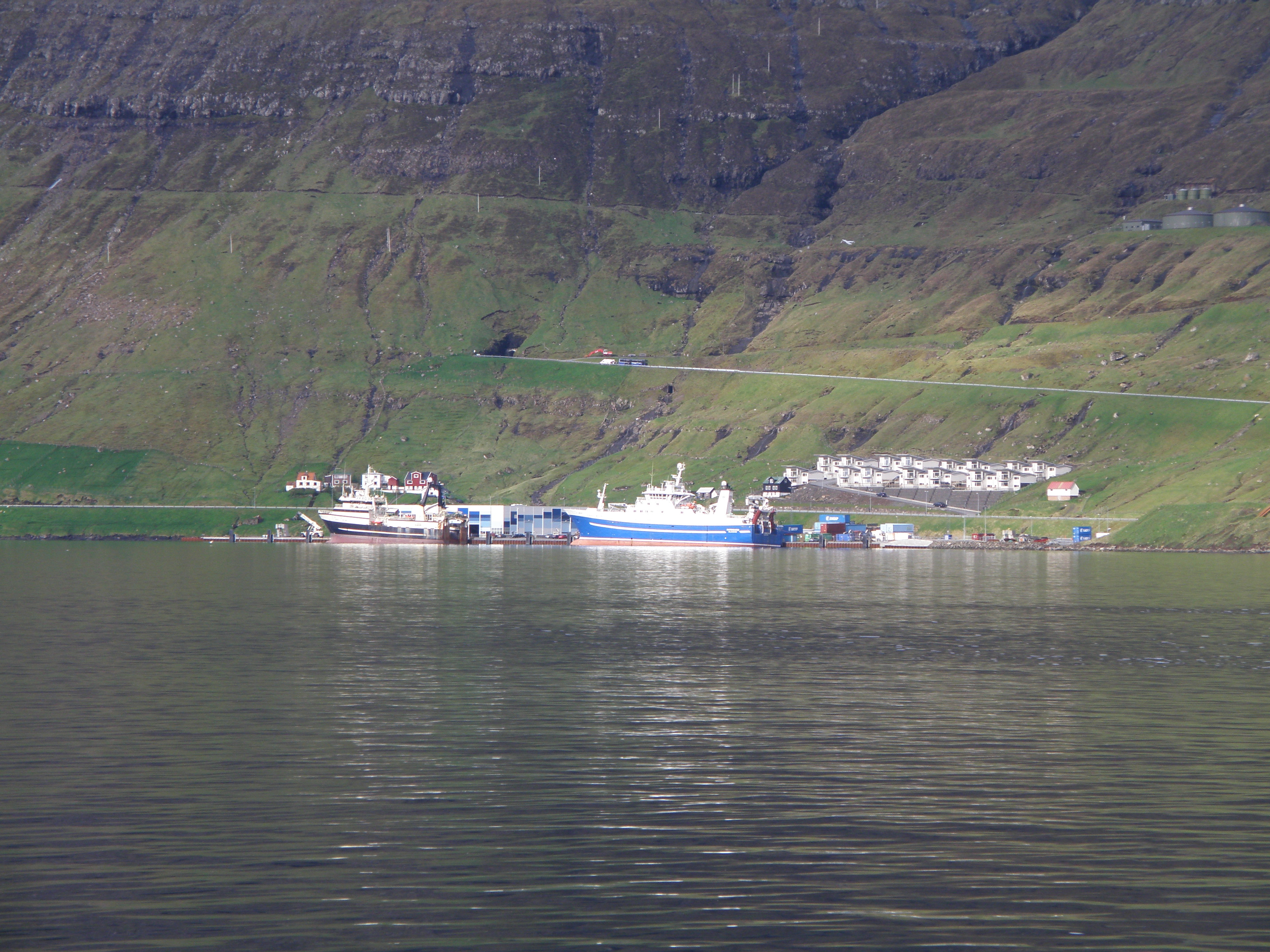
- Ánir and Norðhavn Port in 2011

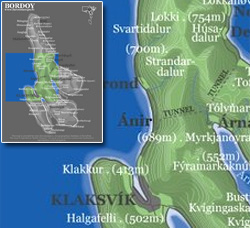
- Position of Ánir on Borðoy's west coast

- Location of the village in the Faroe Islands
- Coordinates: 62°15′23″N 6°34′40″W
- State: Kingdom of Denmark
- Constituent Country: Faroe Islands
- Island: Borðoy
- Municipality: Klaksvík

Population (September 2025)
  - Total: 58
- Time zone: UTC+0 (GMT)
  - Summer (DST): UTC+1 (EST)
- Climate: Cfc

Ánir [ˈɔanɪɹ], also Ánirnar [ˈɔanɪɹnaɹ] (Danish: Åerne) is a village in the Faroe Islands on the northern island of Borðoy. In 2007 it had a population of 16, but with the expansion of the area with the new apartments above the old settlement the population has increased to 55 in 2013.

== General ==
Ánir lies about 3 km north of the northern isles' capital Klaksvík on the west coast of Borðoy and was founded in 1840, as the increasing population demanded more land for cultivation. Facing the village is the southern tip of the island of Kunoy. The road through Ánir continues to Strond and then crosses the causeway to the island of Kunoy to continue to the villages of Haraldssund and Kunoy. High over Ánir is the entrance of a road tunnel to Árnafjørður and on to the island of Viðoy.

As of 1 January 2007 Ánir had 16 inhabitants, in 2013 it had 55 inhabitants. Its Postal Code is FO-726. It belongs to the Municipality of Klaksvík. There are two streets: the four houses of the original village are at the main road to Kunoy (Ánavegur) and 15 modern villas have been built in 2009 at a new road called Edmundstrøð (N° 1–28).

The Faroese word ánir is a rare variant of vánir and means 'forecasts, prospects, hopes'.

== Swallowed by Klaksvík? ==
The old settlement of Ánir consists of just the small cluster of houses shown in the images in this article. This tranquil and more or less picturesque aspect of Ánir was lost when in 2005 the new freight harbour of Klaksvík (also called the Ánir Cargo Terminal or Norðhavnin) was built right in front of the settlement. This harbour has 200 metres of quayside, 12 m deep, with 30,000 sqm of storage area for containers, a cold storage facility and a 30 m wide roll-on/roll-off ramp. Additionally, a real estate development involving the construction of 15 modern villas on Edmundstrøð at Ánir's entrance has affected the visual aspect of the village. It could be argued that Ánir has been sacrificed for the growth of Klaksvík and has become part of Klaksvík's outskirts. Today the "old Ánir" looks half-abandoned and out of place in its current setting, with broken down cars parked haphazardly and rubbish lying around. There are no shops or other facilities.

The extension of Klaksvík's port in recent years is a direct consequence of the opening in 2006 of a sub-sea road tunnel between Borðoy and the Faroe's main islands. This tunnel has generated new economic opportunities for Klaksvík. The Port of Klaksvík recently signed a contract with Smyril Line on the use of Ánir as an alternative terminal for the ferry Norröna.

== Photos ==
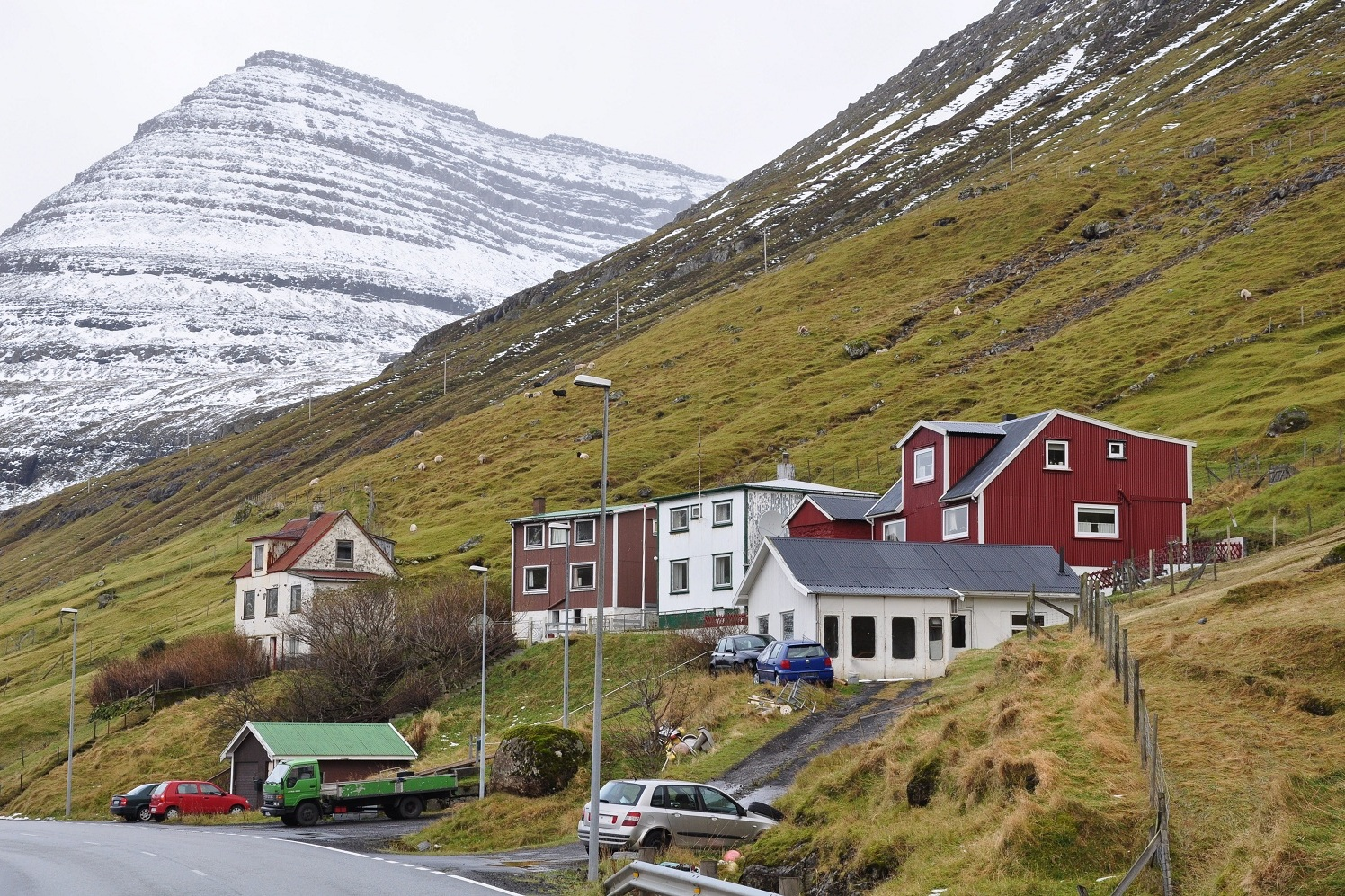
The old part of the village

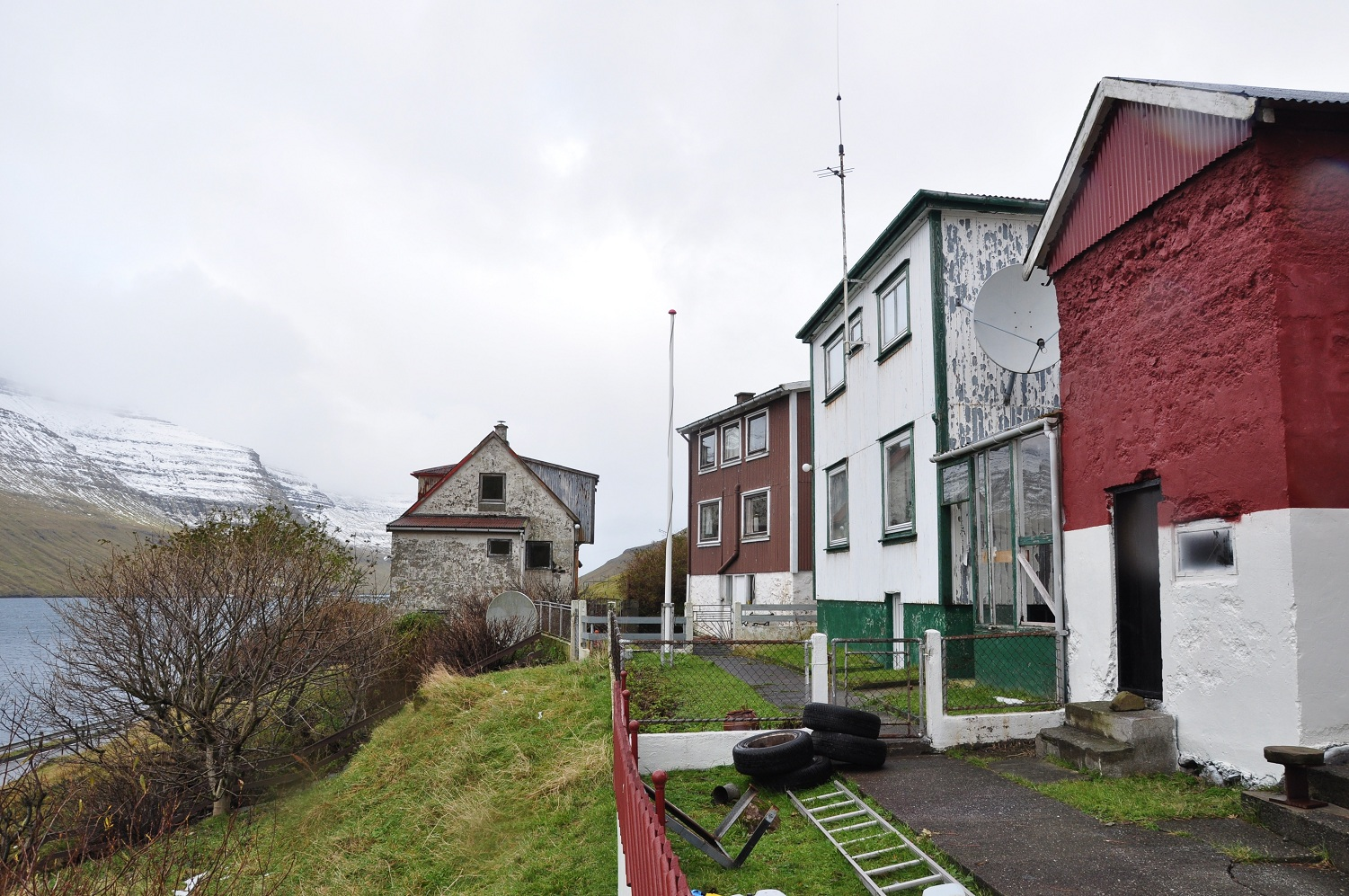
Ánir

== See also ==
- List of towns in the Faroe Islands
