= Streymin Bridge =

Highway bridge in the Faroe Islands

Coordinates: 62.2083°N 7.0055°W

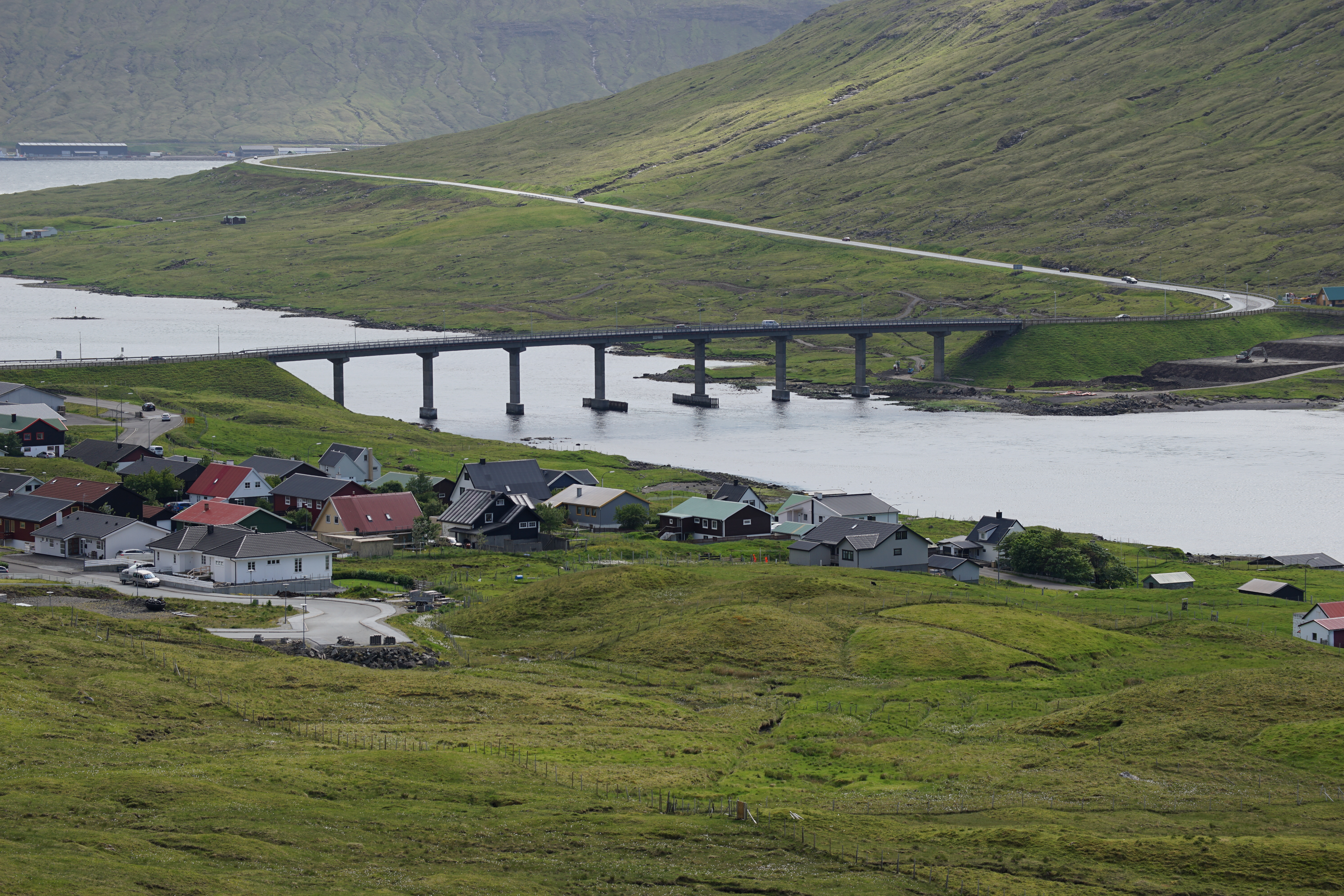
Streymin Bridge, 2018.

The Streymin Bridge (Faroese: Brúgvin um Streymin; in short Brúgvin), is an important highway bridge in the Faroe Islands. It connects the two biggest and most populous islands of Streymoy to the west and Eysturoy to the east. Crossing the Sundini sound at its narrowest point, it is jokingly referred to as the 'Bridge over the Atlantic', being the only inter-island bridge in the Faroe Islands, and one of the few such bridges in the Atlantic Ocean.

== Location ==
The bridge is situated between the hamlet of Nesvík on Streymoy and in between Norðskáli and Oyrarbakki on Eysturoy, in the centre of the country. The bridge is part of national road number 10, running from Tórshavn to Klaksvík, and is considered a core road. At both sides of the Sundini sound there are road junctions with roads to Eiði, Tjørnuvík, Oyri and villages in between. Several stores and the region's primary school have clustered around the highway junction. Oyrarbakki is a main interchange in the country's public transport network. Apart from the interregional role, the bridge is an important link within Sunda municipality, which stretches both sides of the Sundini sound. The bridge has two car lanes and a narrow shared bicycle/foot path.

== History ==
Construction started in 1970 and the opening was 30 October 1973. During the first three years after opening, the bridge only linked Streymoy to Eysturoy's western half. It was not until 1976, when the Norðskálatunnilin opened, that the bridge gained a genuinely inter-regional character, as this tunnel linked the western Eysturoy to eastern Eysturoy's road network. Previous to 1973, traffic heading from the capital to Norðskáli or Eiði had to take a car ferry from Hósvík to Oyrarbakki. Until 1976, traffic from Tórshavn to the Skálafjørður and Leirvík had to take either the car crossing from Hósvík to Selatrað or a direct, slower ferry.

In concert with construction, the Sundini sound was dredged and deepened to 4 metres (13 ft) (at mean water level) in order to allow ships with a deeper draft. The bridge's clearance is 17 metres (56 ft).

== Future ==
In 2011, on average 4,497 vehicles crossed the bridge per day. This number may halve to around 2,070 following the opening of the Eysturoyartunnilin in December 2020, creating a much quicker alternative for traffic between the capital Tórshavn, the Skálafjørður and the Northern Isles. The loss of potential clientele has caused slight distress in the region. However, the current bridge continues to be part of the Core Road Network. Also for traffic between Tórshavn and Klaksvík, the bridge may continue to attract users who want to avoid the tunnel toll. Implications for the bus servicing are not known, yet it is likely that the country's frequent and trunk route #400, from Tórshavn to Klaksvík, will be rerouted through the Eysturoyartunnilin, following a shorter and altogether more populous course.
