= Hvalbiartunnilin =

Two tunnels on the island of Suðuroy, Faroe Islands

Nýggi Hvalbiartunnilin
- Interactive map of Nýggi Hvalbiartunnilin

Overview
- Location: Hvalba and Trongisvágur, Faroe Islands
- Coordinates: 61.5664°N 6.9201°W
- Status: Active

Operation
- Work began: 2019
- Opened: 2021
- Owner: Landsverk
- Operator: Landsverk
- Traffic: Automotive
- Vehicles per day: 2,000 (2030)

Technical
- Length: 2,050 m (6,730 ft)
- No. of lanes: 2
- Operating speed: 80 km/h (50 mph)
- Max elevation: 101 m (331 ft)
- Min elevation: 81 m (266 ft)
- Tunnel clearance: 4.6 m (15 ft)
- Width: 7.0 m (23.0 ft)
- Grade: 6.00 %

The Hvalbiartunnilin (transl. Hvalba Tunnel) is the name applied to two tunnels on the island of Suðuroy, the most southerly of the Faroe Islands. The original Hvalbiartunnilin is the oldest tunnel in the country, while the new Hvalbiartunnilin opened in 2021. Both tunnels connect the villages of Hvalba and Trongisvágur. The tunnels are owned and maintained by the public works authority Landsverk.

== History ==
In the centuries before the tunnel arrived, Hvalba and Trongisvágur were connected by a footpath via the Krákugjógv. Construction of the Hvalbiartunnilin started in 1961, and it opened in 1963 as the first tunnel in the country. It closed on 8 May 2021 with the opening of the new tunnel. The old tunnel was an unlit, one-lane tunnel measuring 1,450 metres (0.90 mi) in length. Because of its limited clearance of 3.2 metres (10 ft), it could not handle modern-sized large vehicles, which typically measure 3.7 to 4.0 metres (12.1 to 13.1 ft), including lorries, trailers and touring cars. This impeded transport to the rest of the country. Northbound traffic had to yield to southbound traffic in passing places, slowing transit and reducing road safety.

In 2017, it was decided to replace the old tunnel with a new tunnel. This tunnel, with two lanes and a clearance of 4.5 metres (15 ft), measures 2.5 kilometres (1.6 mi) in length. Boring started on 27 June 2019 and finished on 7 July 2020. A new access road of 2.4 kilometres (1.5 mi) was constructed on the Hvalba side and 1.4 kilometres (0.87 mi) on the Trongisvágur side. The tunnel is built by ArtiCon and LNS. It cost 272 million DKK. The tunnel opened on 8 May 2021 with a ceremony, oldtimers and a convoy of lorries that previously could not access Hvalba. The old tunnel will be repurposed and is, as of December 2023, fenced off for traffic.

The new Hvalbiartunnilin would gain additional importance if the subsea Suðuroyartunnilin is constructed between Sandvík on Suðuroy and the island of Sandoy. This tunnel has yet to be decided upon, but according to plans, it should open around 2030. Sandoy is connected to the capital Tórshavn and the rest of the country via the Sandoyartunnilin.

The footpath between Hvalba and Trongisvágur is a popular hiking route.

Gamli Hvalbiartunnilin
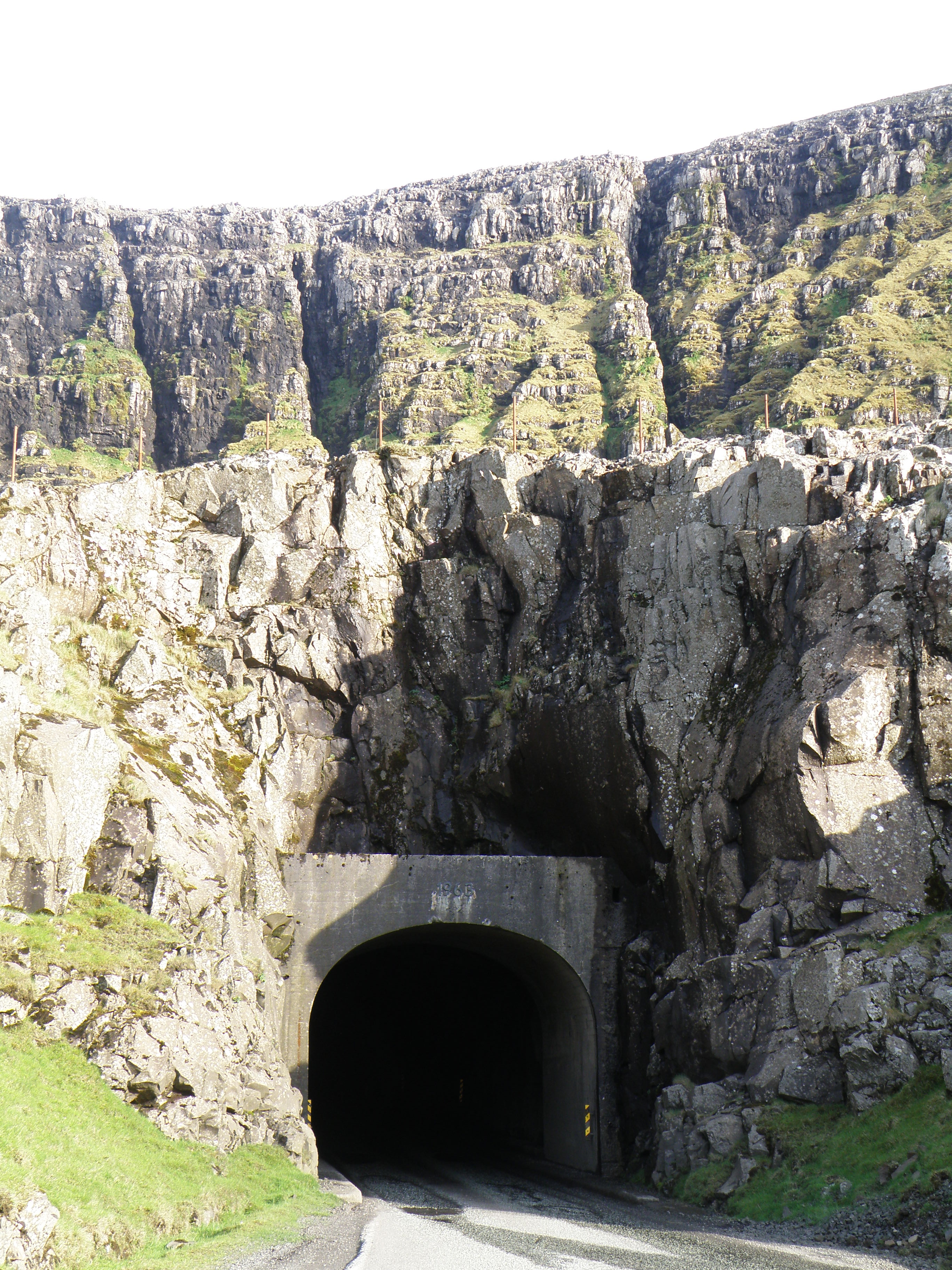
- Entrance near Hvalba
- Interactive map of Gamli Hvalbiartunnilin

Overview
- Location: Hvalba and Trongisvágur, Faroe Islands
- Status: Closed for traffic

Operation
- Work began: 1961
- Opened: 1963
- Owner: Landsverk
- Operator: Landsverk
- Traffic: Automotive
- Vehicles per day: 900 (2017)

Technical
- Length: 1,450 m (4,760 ft)
- No. of lanes: 1
- Operating speed: 80 km/h (50 mph)
- Max elevation: 227 m (745 ft)
- Min elevation: 150 m (490 ft)
- Tunnel clearance: 3.2 m (10 ft)
- Width: 3.3 m (11 ft)
- Grade: 5.61%

== See also ==
- List of tunnels of the Faroe Islands
