= Strond =

- Abandoned village
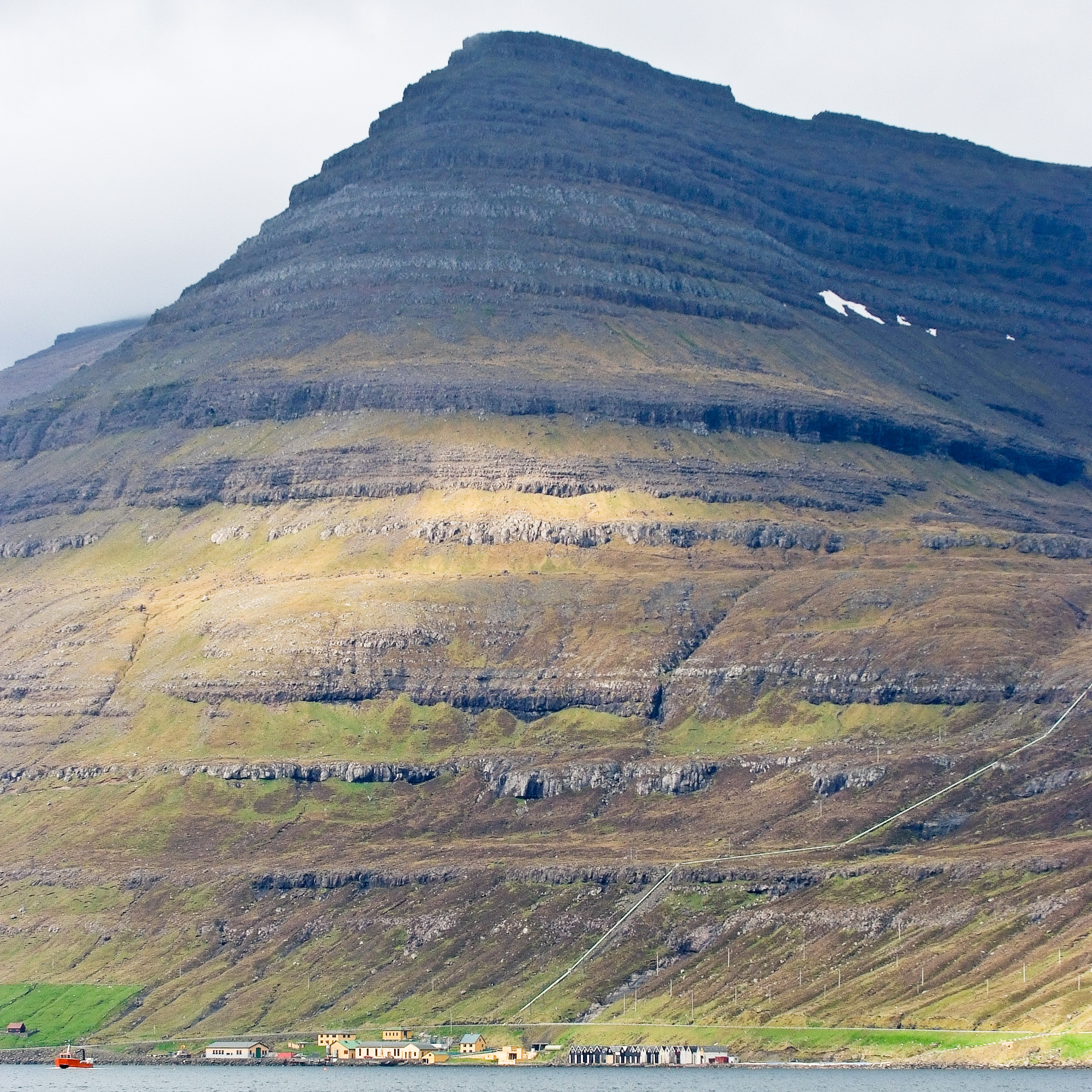

- Location in the Faroe Islands
- Coordinates: 62°16′N 6°35′W
- State: Kingdom of Denmark
- Constituent country: Faroe Islands
- Island: Borðoy
- Municipality: Klaksvík

Population
  - Total: none
- Time zone: GMT
  - Summer (DST): UTC+1 (EST)

Strond is a former village in the north of the town of Klaksvík on the sound of Haraldssund in the Faroe Islands.

It is situated on Borðoy on the causeway connecting Borðoy and Kunoy. Since 1930 no people have lived there. There is a power plant there, first made as a hydro-electric power plant, but later it was expanded with a diesel power plant. Sund was first mentioned in old documents in 1584.

Strond is currently the home to the world's largest smolt farm on land, which is owned and operated by the salmon producer, Bakkafrost. The project is estimated to cost between 600-700m Danish kroner. The smolt farm was finished by the end of 2020, but they started production in 2018, with only half of the farm finished. It is today operating at full capacity with ten different farm halls, and is on a yearly basis raising around 14 million smolt. The smolt farm manages to reuse and recirculate 99% of its water. This is done by using biofilters in every hall.
