= Oyrarbakki =

- Village
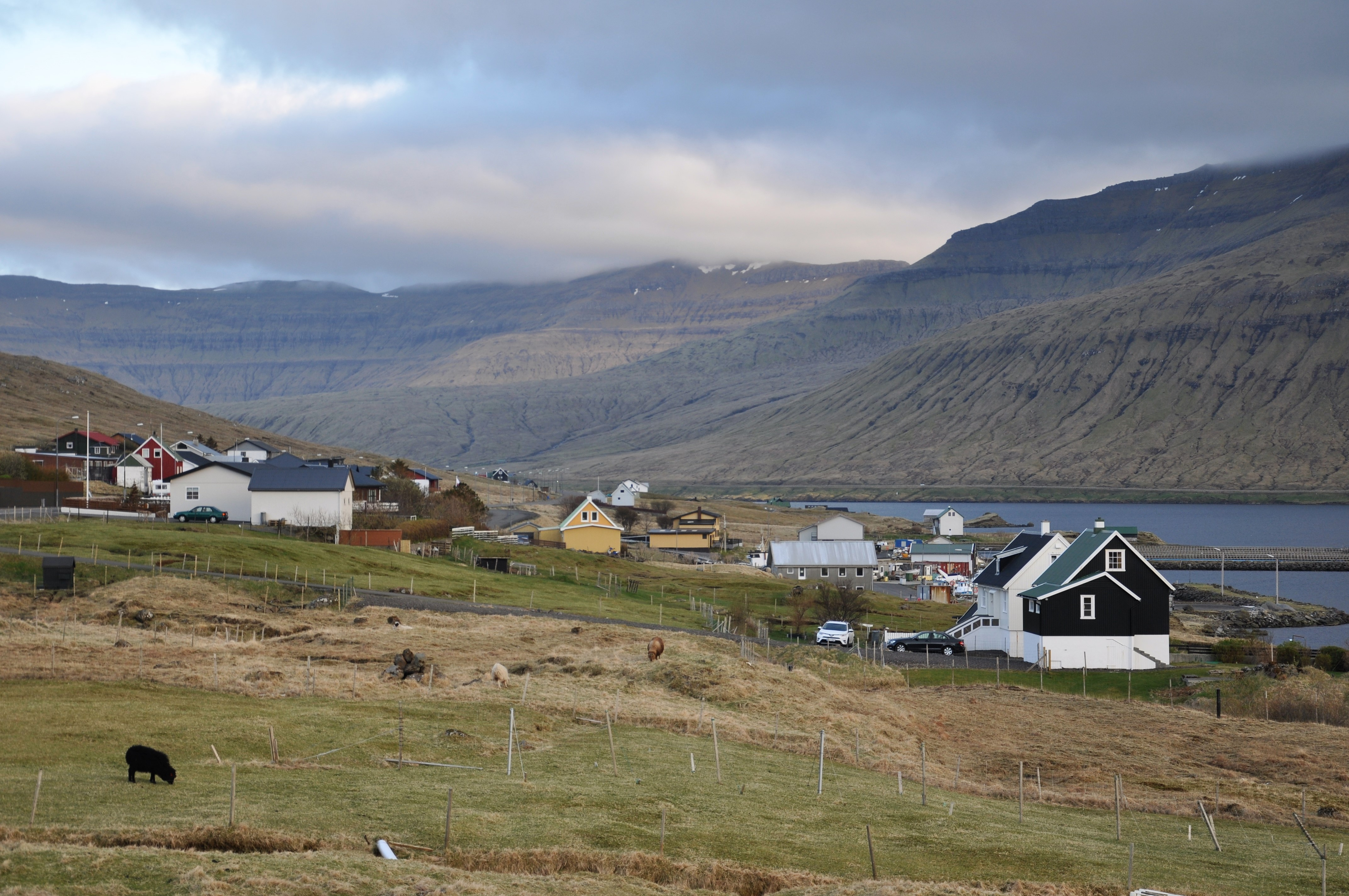
- Oyrarbakki

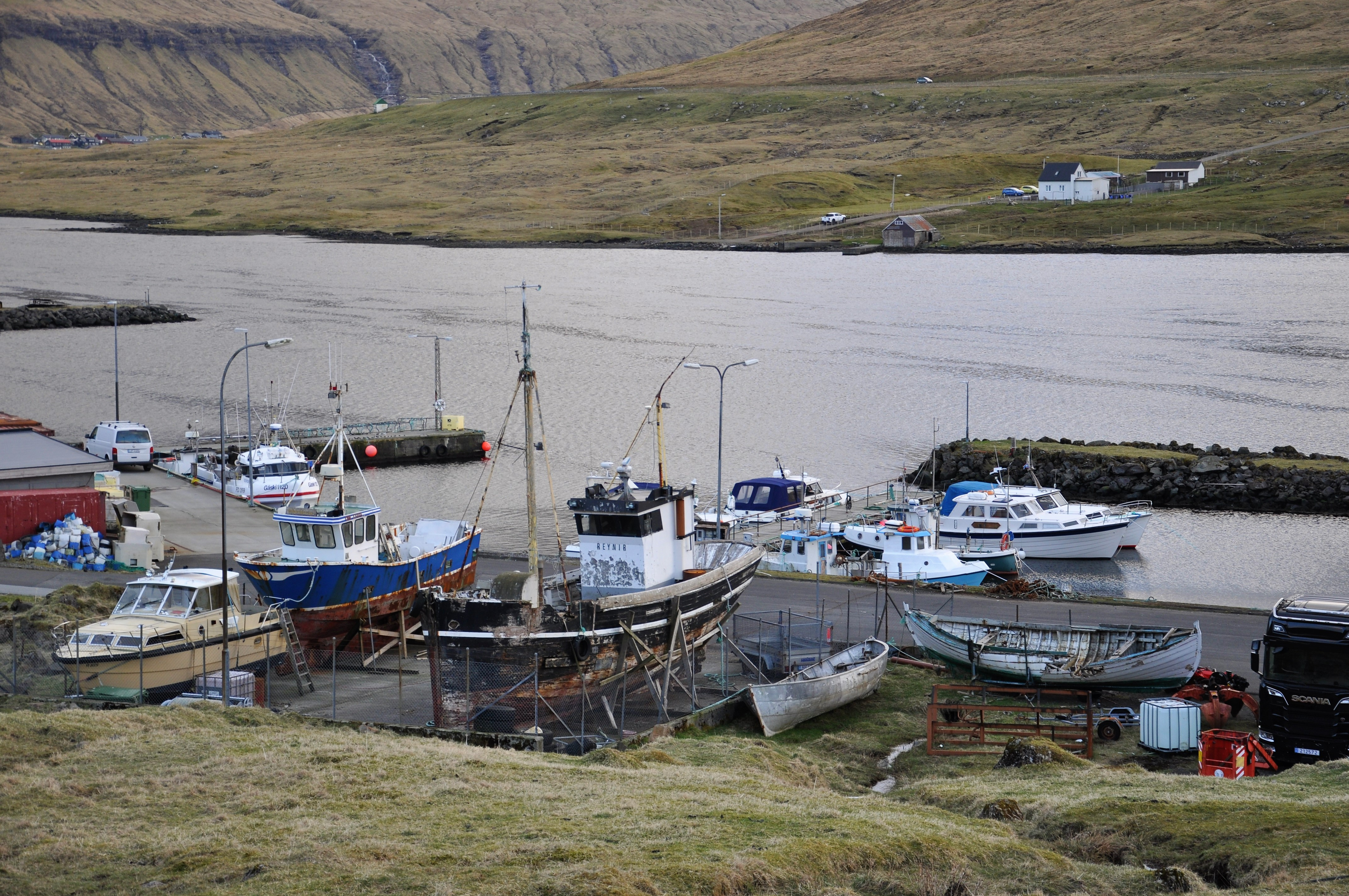
- Oyrarbakki port

- Location in the Faroe Islands
- Coordinates: 62°12′5″N 6°59′40″W
- State: Kingdom of Denmark
- Constituent country: Faroe Islands
- Island: Eysturoy
- Municipality: Sunda

Population (September 2025)
  - Total: 155
- Time zone: GMT
  - Summer (DST): UTC+1 (EST)
- Postal code: 400
- Climate: Cfc

Oyrarbakki is a village on the west coast of the Faroese island of Eysturoy in the Sunda municipality, between Norðskáli and Oyri.

In 2005 the population was 97, which grew to 163 as of 2023 Its postal code is FO 400.

The nearby 226-metre Streymin Bridge across to the island of Streymoy to the west opened in 1976. Oyrarbakki now has a large school, shops and a modern post office building.

== See also ==
- List of towns in the Faroe Islands
