= Árnafjørður =

- Village
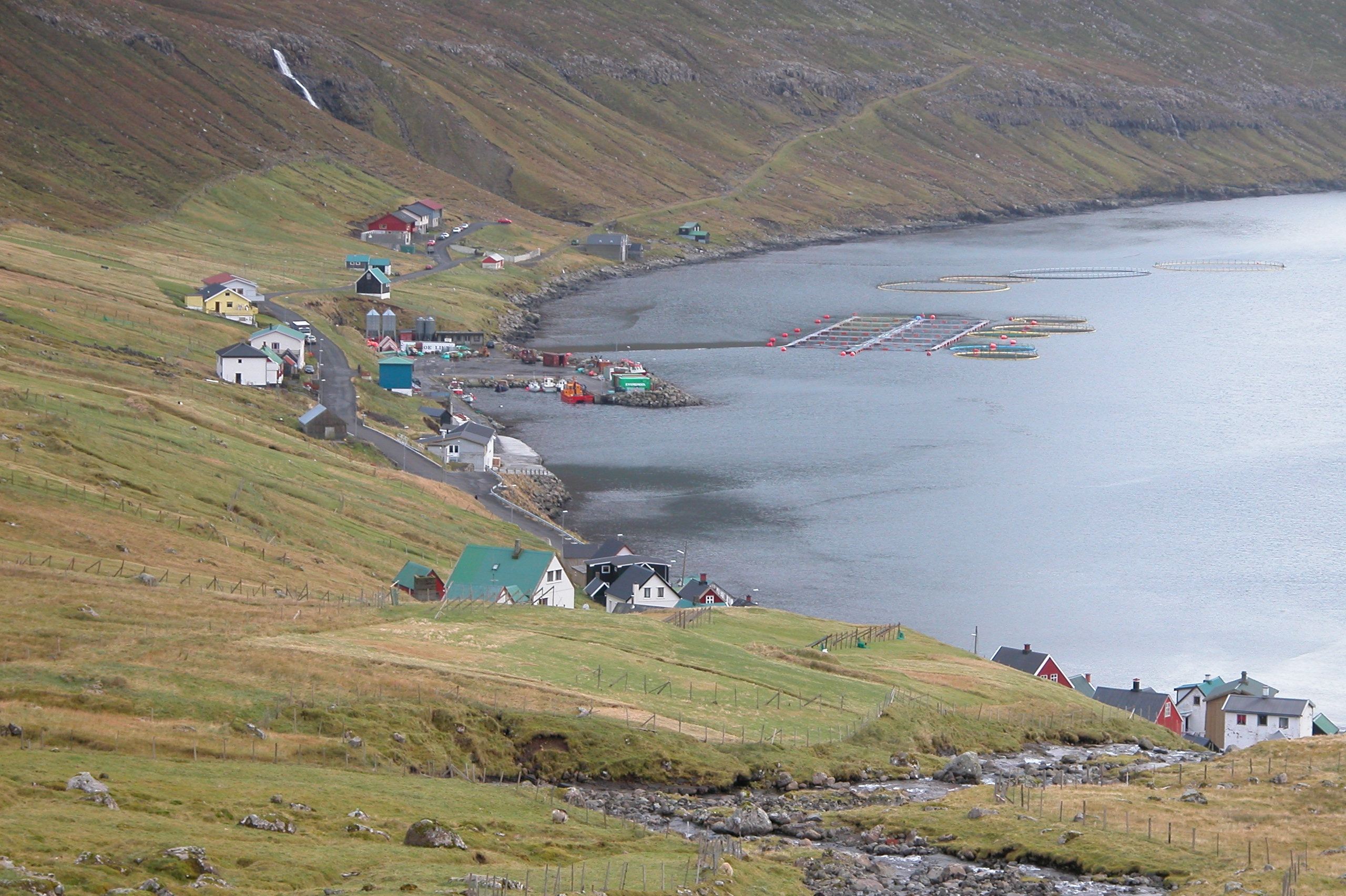
- Árnafjørður bay

- Location of the village in the Faroe Islands
- Coordinates: 62°15′21″N 6°32′3″W
- State: Kingdom of Denmark
- Constituent country: Faroe Islands
- Island: Borðoy
- Municipality: Klaksvík

Population (September 2025)
  - Total: 64
- Time zone: UTC+0 (GMT)
  - Summer (DST): UTC+1 (EST)
- Climate: Cfc

Árnafjørður (Danish: Arnefjord) is a town of the municipality of Klaksvík, on the island of Borðoy, in the Faroe Islands.

Árnafjørður is located at the bottom of a deep inlet, named Árnfjarðarvík, "corner fjord's bay", on the east side of Borðoy. In 1875, an abandoned Norwegian vessel loaded with large amounts of timber drifted ashore at Árnafjørður. The timber was sold at an auction and, because of the sudden surplus, the price for timber decreased significantly. Timber has always been expensive in the Faroes as, other than driftwood, it usually has to be imported.

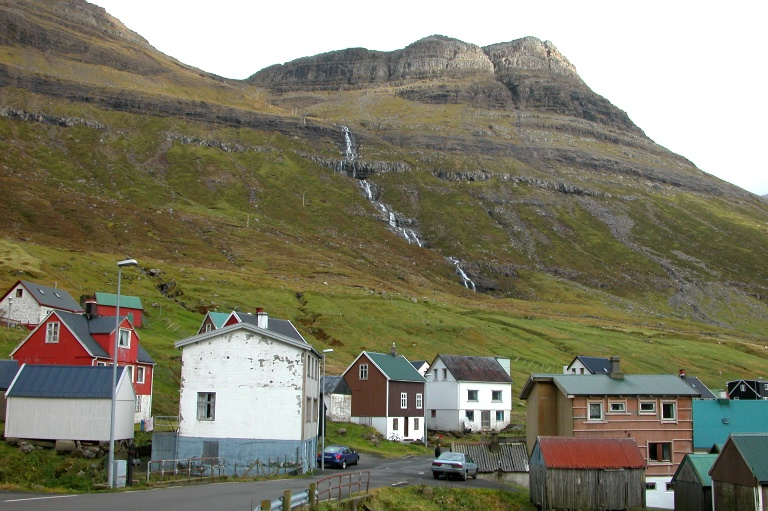
Houses in Árnafjørður

== See also ==
- List of towns in the Faroe Islands
