= Norðskáli =

- Village
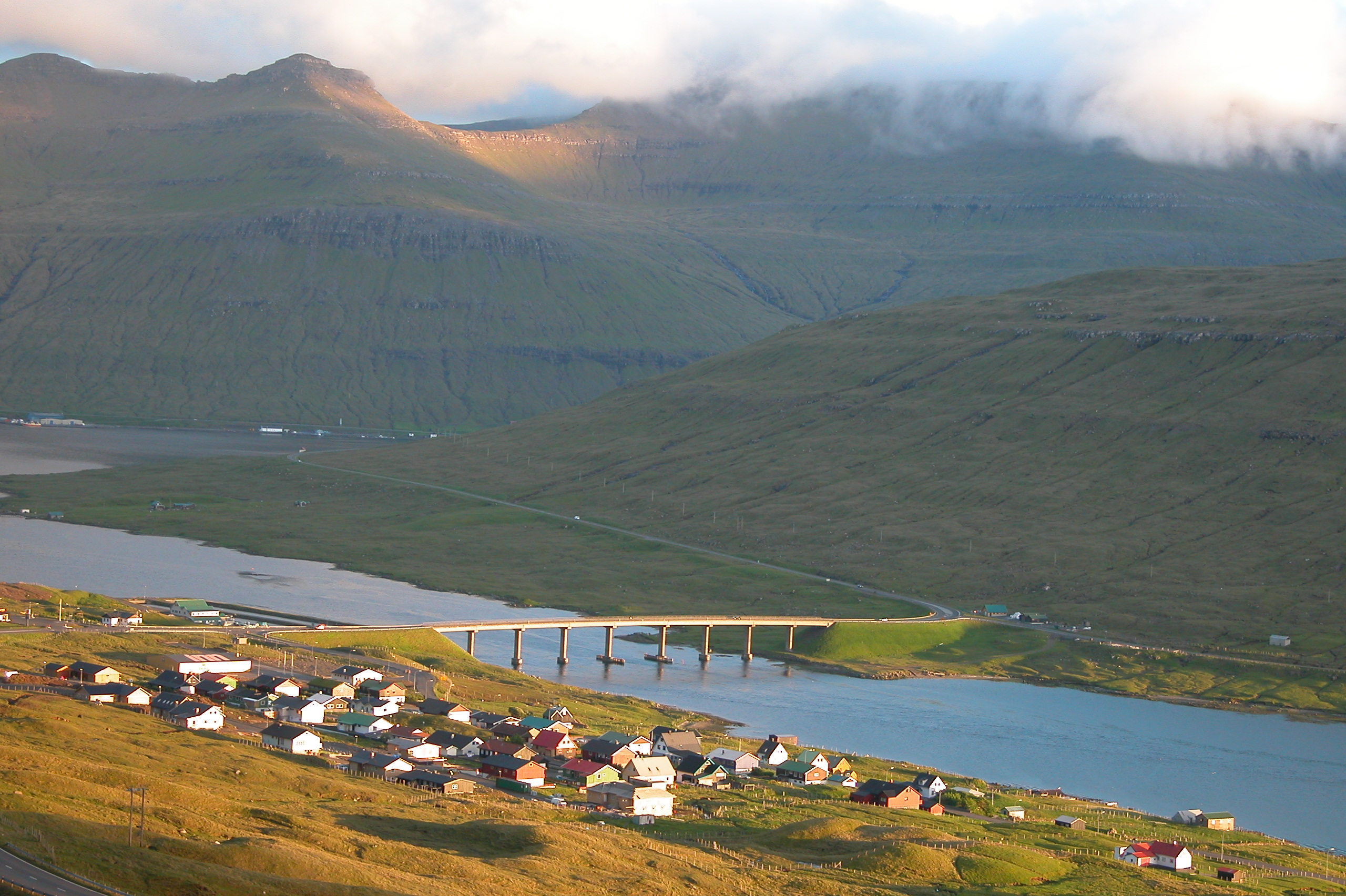
- The Sundini sound at Norðskáli, Faroe Islands, is crossed by the Streymin Bridge

- Location in the Faroe Islands
- Coordinates: 62°12′47″N 6°59′59″W
- State: Kingdom of Denmark
- Constituent country: Faroe Islands
- Island: Eysturoy
- Municipality: Sunda

Population (September 2025)
  - Total: 314
- Time zone: GMT
  - Summer (DST): UTC+1 (EST)
- Postal code: FO 460
- Climate: Cfc

Norðskáli is a settlement in the Faroe Islands on the island of Eysturoy, a few kilometres north of Oyri.

Its name means north dwelling and its population is 330.

The 226-metre Streymin Bridge crosses Sundini from the island of Streymoy between Norðskáli and Oyri. Since the bridge was opened in 1976, a settlement named Oyrarbakki has grown up near the bridge, with a large school, shops and a post office.

== Gallery ==
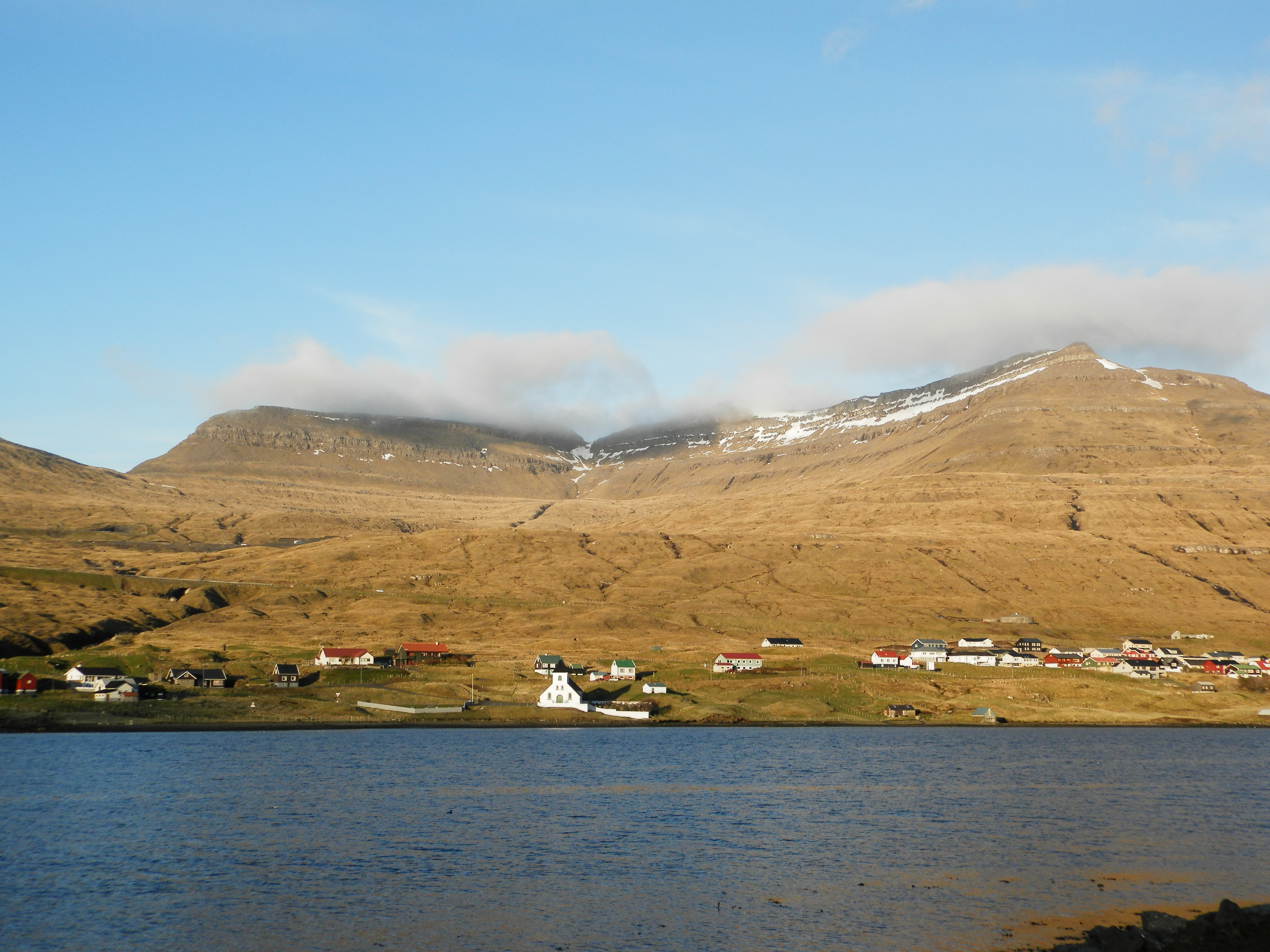
Norðskáli, seen from Streymoy

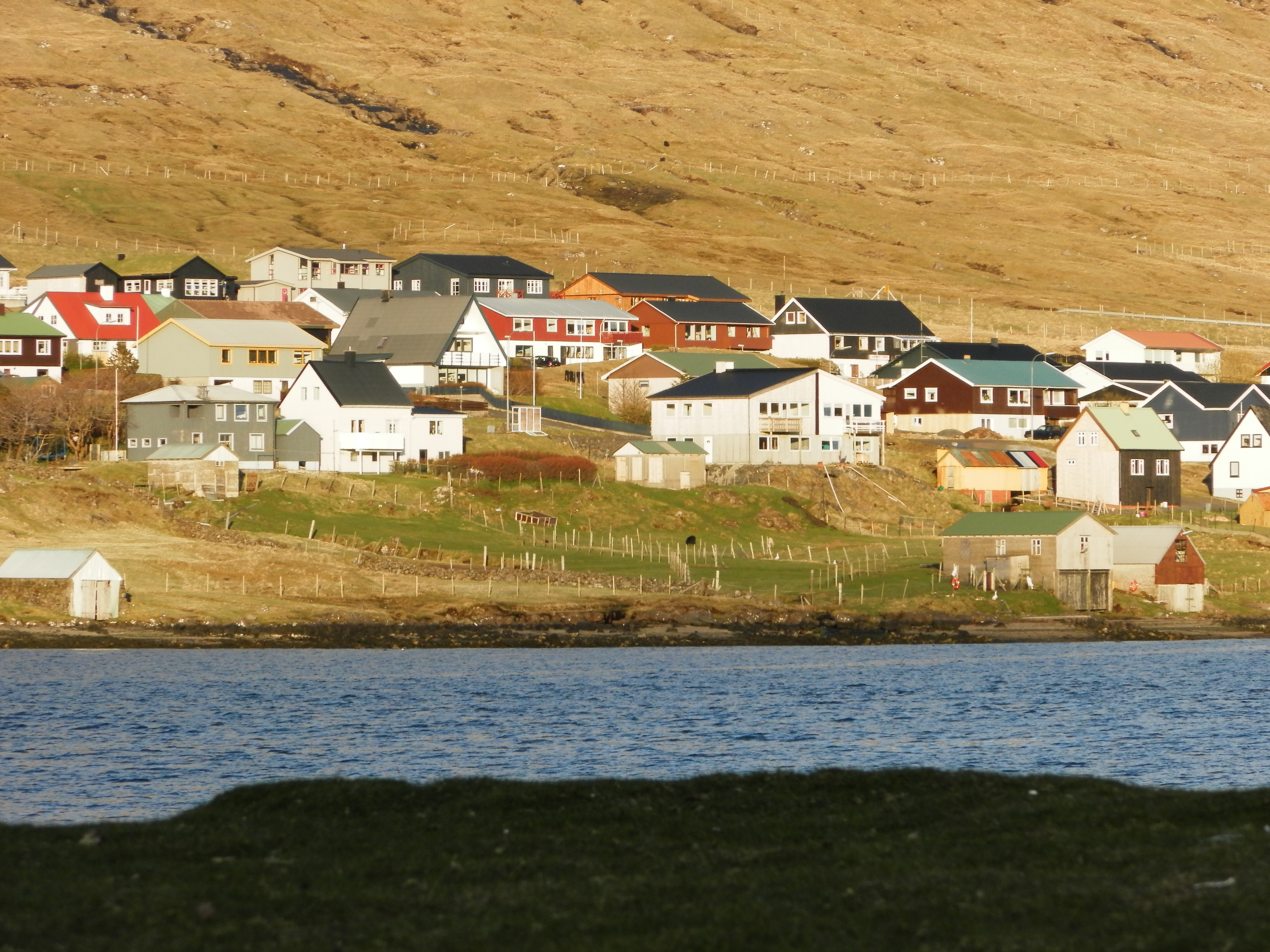
Norðskáli

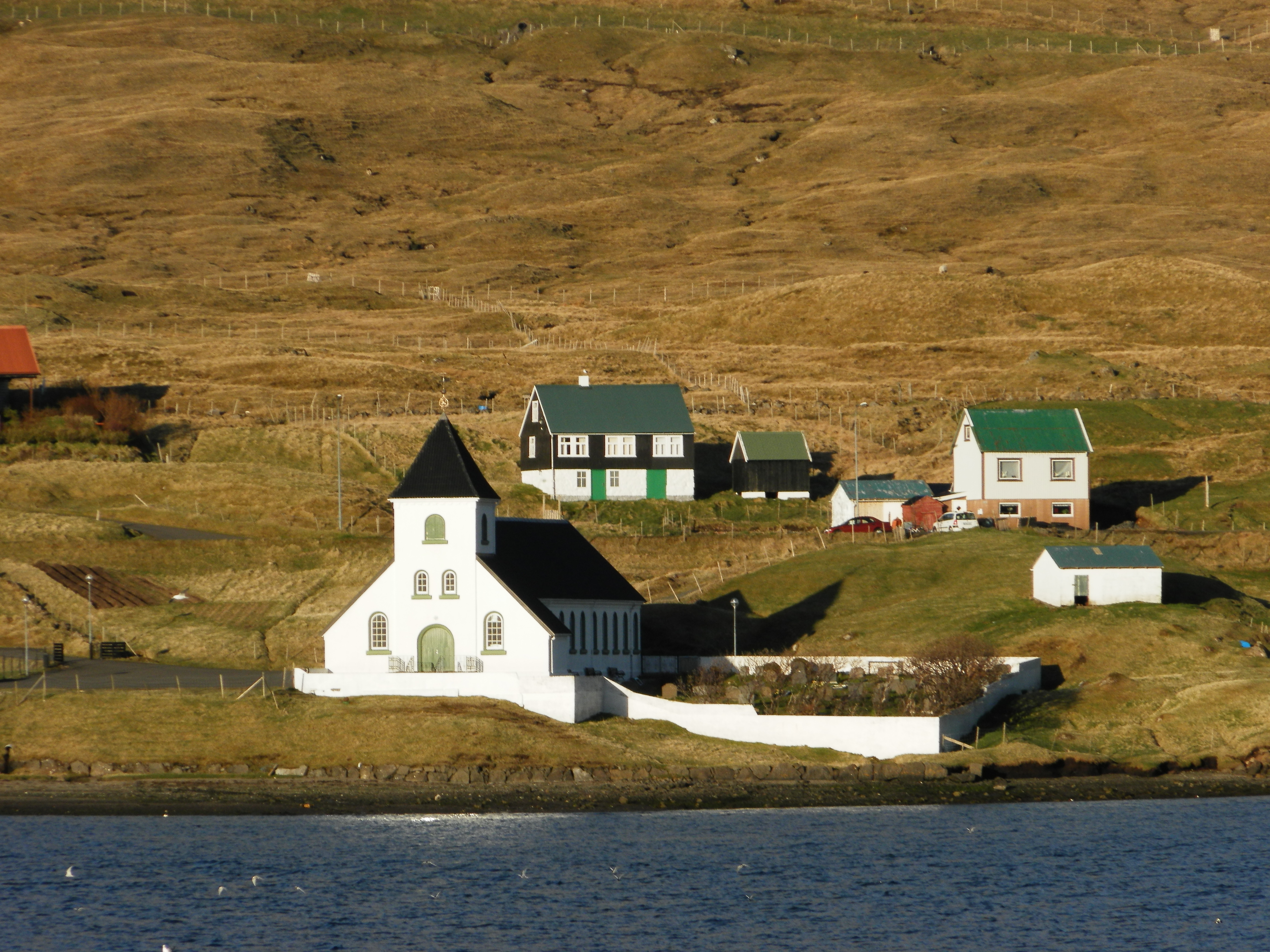
Norðskáli Church

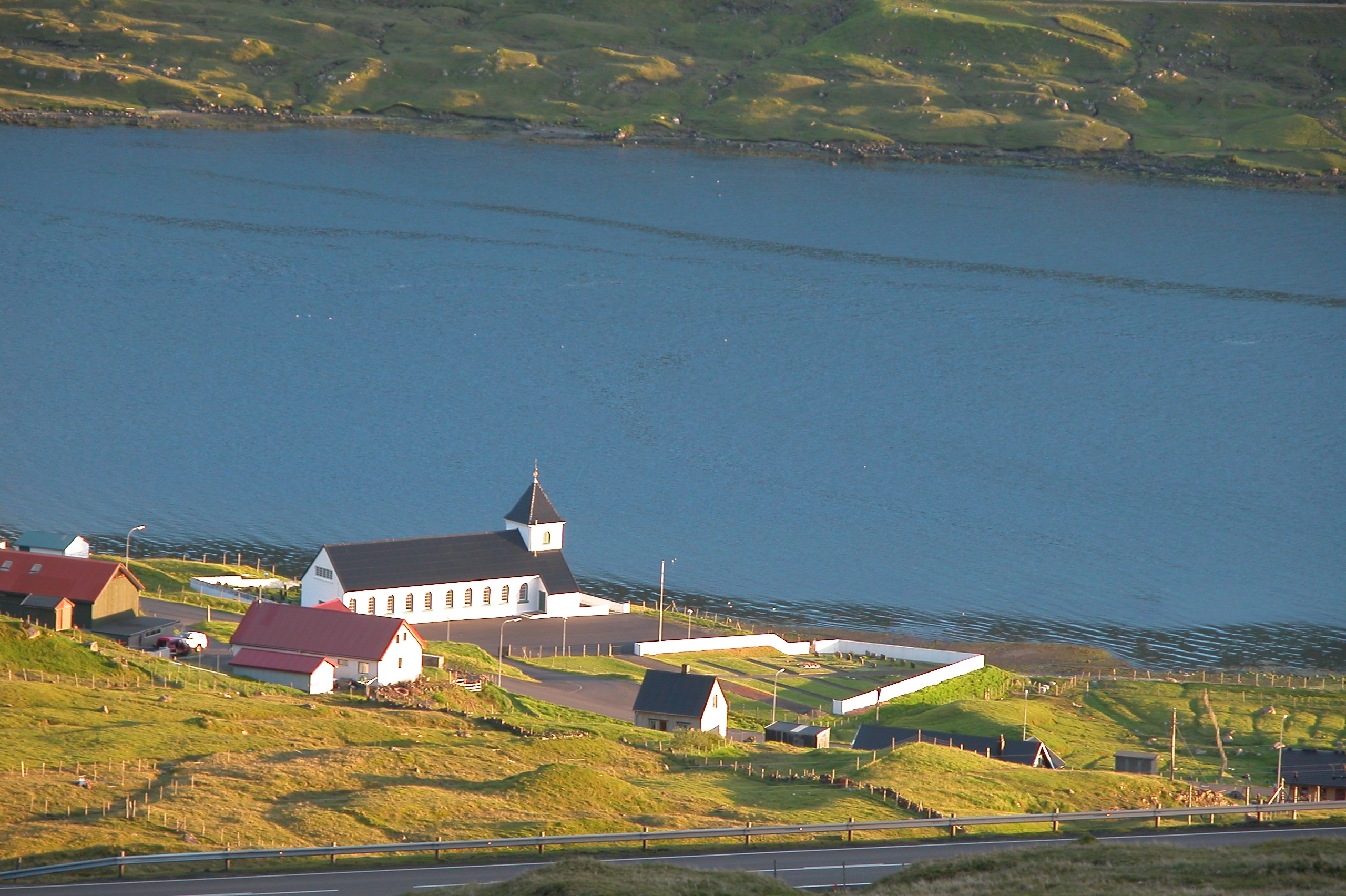
Norðskáli
