= Norðoyatunnilin =

Tunnel from the islands of Eysturoy to Borðoy

Coordinates: 62.208°N 6.682°W

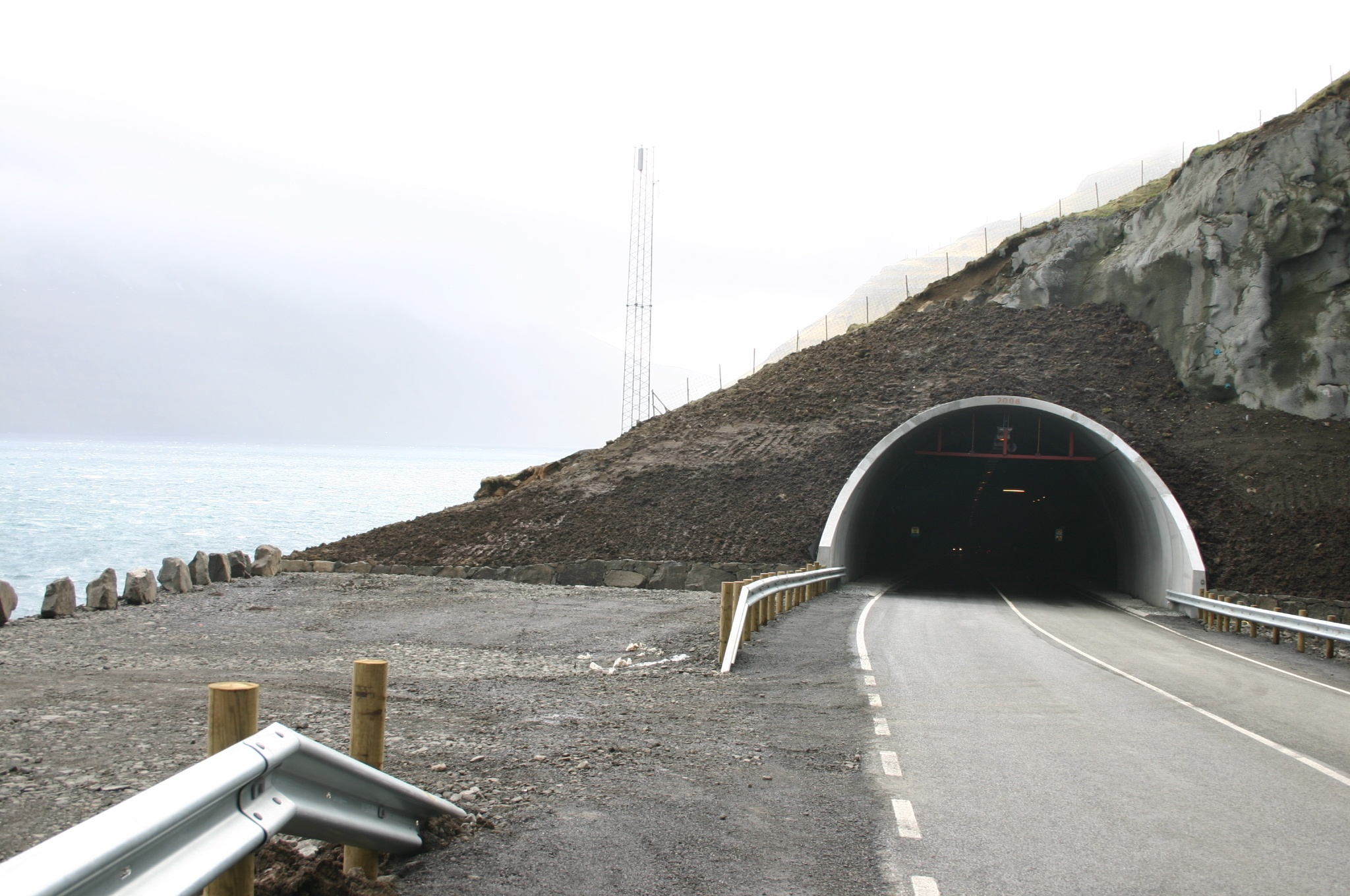
- Norðoyatunnilin seen from the western (Leirvík) side
- Interactive map of Norðoyatunnilin

Overview
- Location: Klaksvík and Leirvík, Faroe Islands
- Status: In operation

Operation
- Work began: 2003
- Opened: 2006
- Operator: Tunnil P/f
- Traffic: Automotive
- Toll: Yes
- Vehicles per day: 4,221 (2024-2025)

Technical
- Length: 6,186 m (20,295 ft)
- No. of lanes: 2
- Operating speed: 80 km/h (50 mph)
- Max elevation: 19.5 m (64 ft)
- Min elevation: −150 m (−490 ft)
- Tunnel clearance: 4.6 m (15 ft)
- Width: 7.0 m (23.0 ft)
- Grade: 5.9%

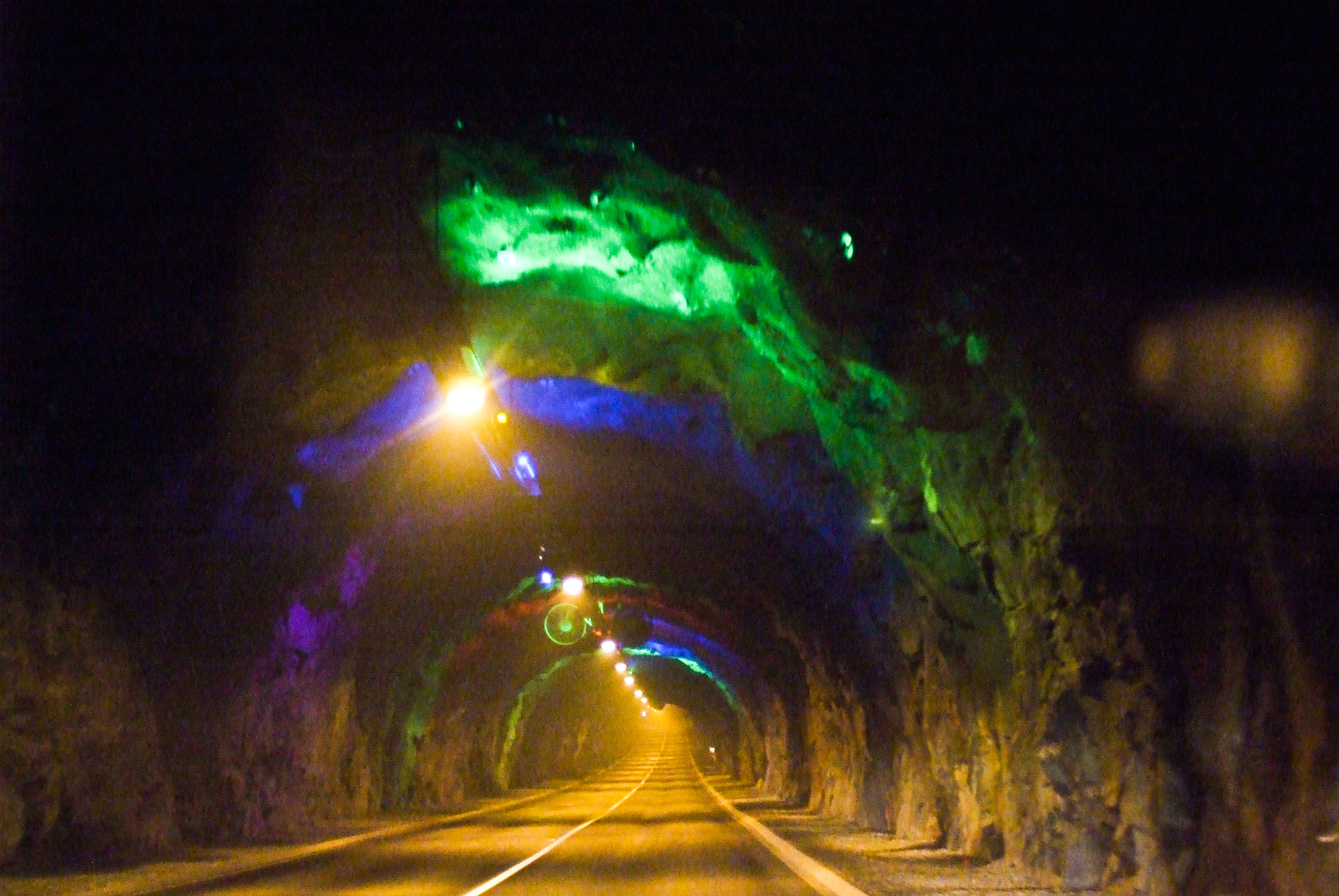
Light art by Tróndur Patursson

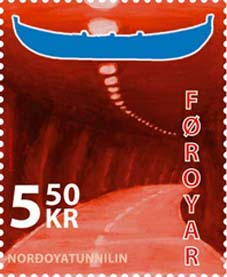
Stamp of 2006 by Postverk Føroya.

Norðoyatunnilin (The Northern Isles Tunnel) is a two-lane road tunnel under the Leirvíksfjørður in the Faroe Islands. It connects the islands of Eysturoy and Borðoy. The tunnel is 6.2 km long and goes down to a depth of 150 metres below sea level. The maximum gradient is approximately 6%. The tunnel entrances are near the towns of Leirvík on Eysturoy, and Klaksvík on Borðoy. Until the Eysturoyartunnilin opened in December 2020, Norðoyatunnilin was the longest tunnel in the Faroe Islands.

== History ==
In 1988 Landsverkfrøðingurin (the national office of public works) carried out a number of seismic investigations in Leirvíksfjørður (the strait between Eysturoy and Borðoy). A year earlier, an engineer had drawn up an overall plan showing alternative sites for constructing tunnels. Further surveys in 1988 confirmed that the tunnel plans were considered to be economically viable. In 2003, after the 1990s Faroese economic crisis, work began on boring the tunnel between Eysturoy and Borðoy. The official opening of the tunnel was on April 29, 2006. Traffic has steadily increased from 662,828 vehicles in 2007 to 1,544,948 in 2024 (4,221 per day). The project cost 395 million Danish kroner and is expected to be repaid by 2021.

== See also ==
- List of tunnels of the Faroe Islands
