= Nesvík =

- Village
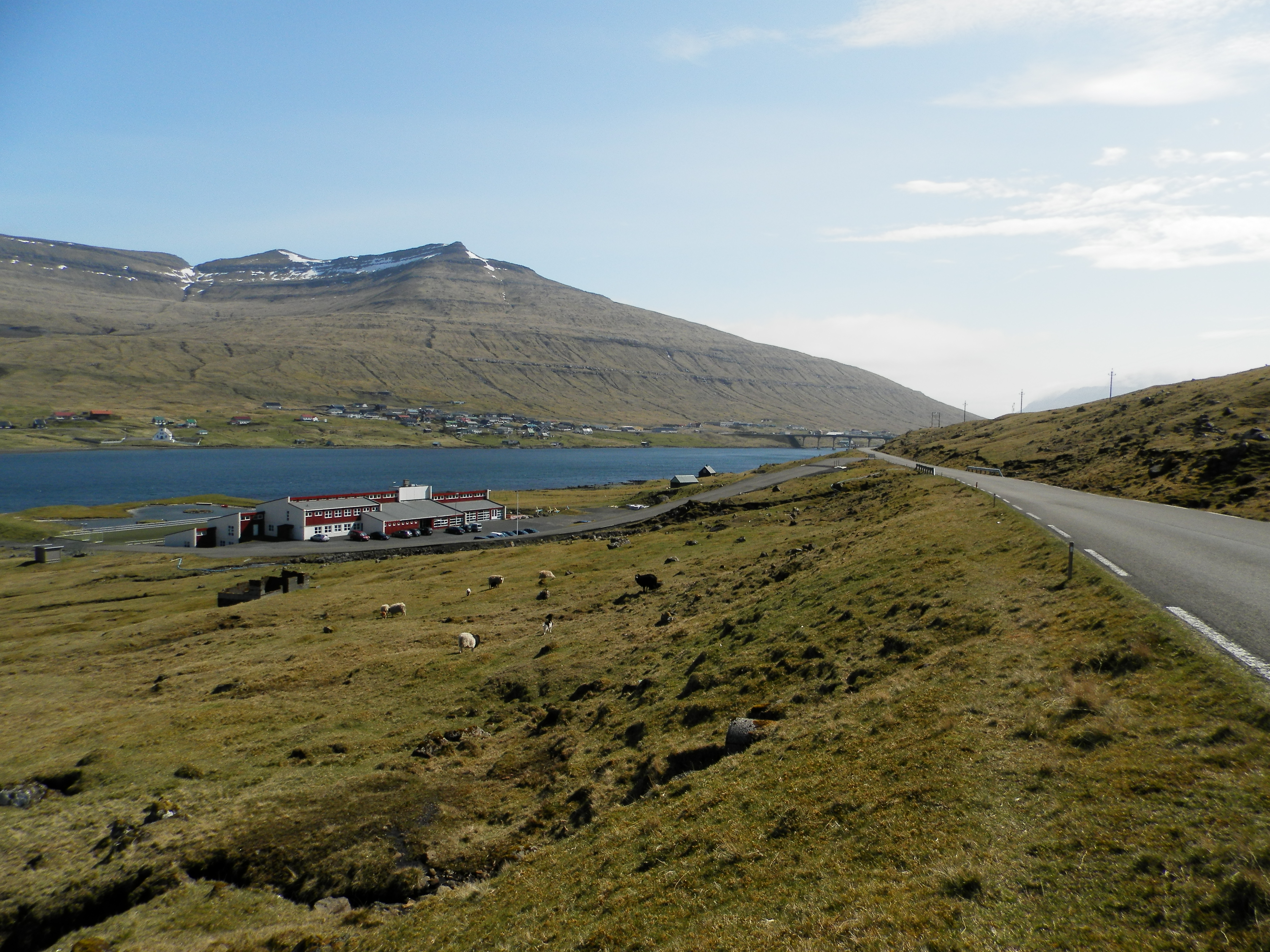

- Location in the Faroe Islands
- Coordinates: 62°12′35″N 7°0′30″W
- State: Kingdom of Denmark
- Constituent country: Faroe Islands
- Island: Streymoy
- Municipality: Sunda

Population (30 April 2025)
  - Total: 0
- Time zone: GMT
  - Summer (DST): UTC+1 (EST)
- Postal code: FO 437
- Climate: Cfc

Nesvík is a village on the east coast of the Faroese island of Streymoy, located in the Sunda municipality.

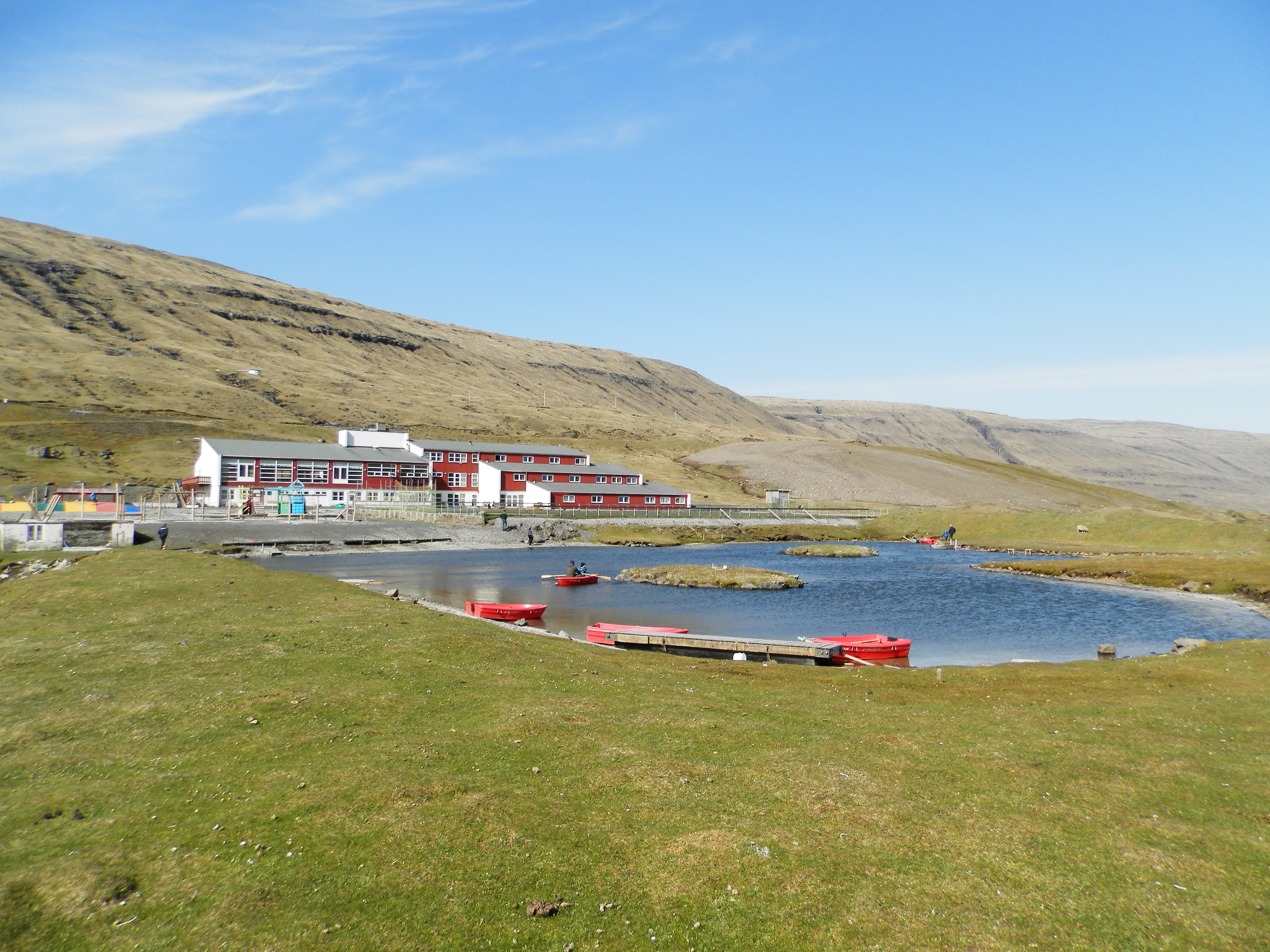
A Christian Family Holiday Centre in Nesvík, called Leguhúsið í Nesvík

The population has been 0 since 2016, when the last inhabitants left. Nesvík is home to a religious camp of the conservative Inner Mission of the national church, and a conference center called Leguhusið í Nesvík. Its name is derived from the Faroese words for cape and bay.

== See also ==
- List of towns in the Faroe Islands
