= Leirvík =

- Village
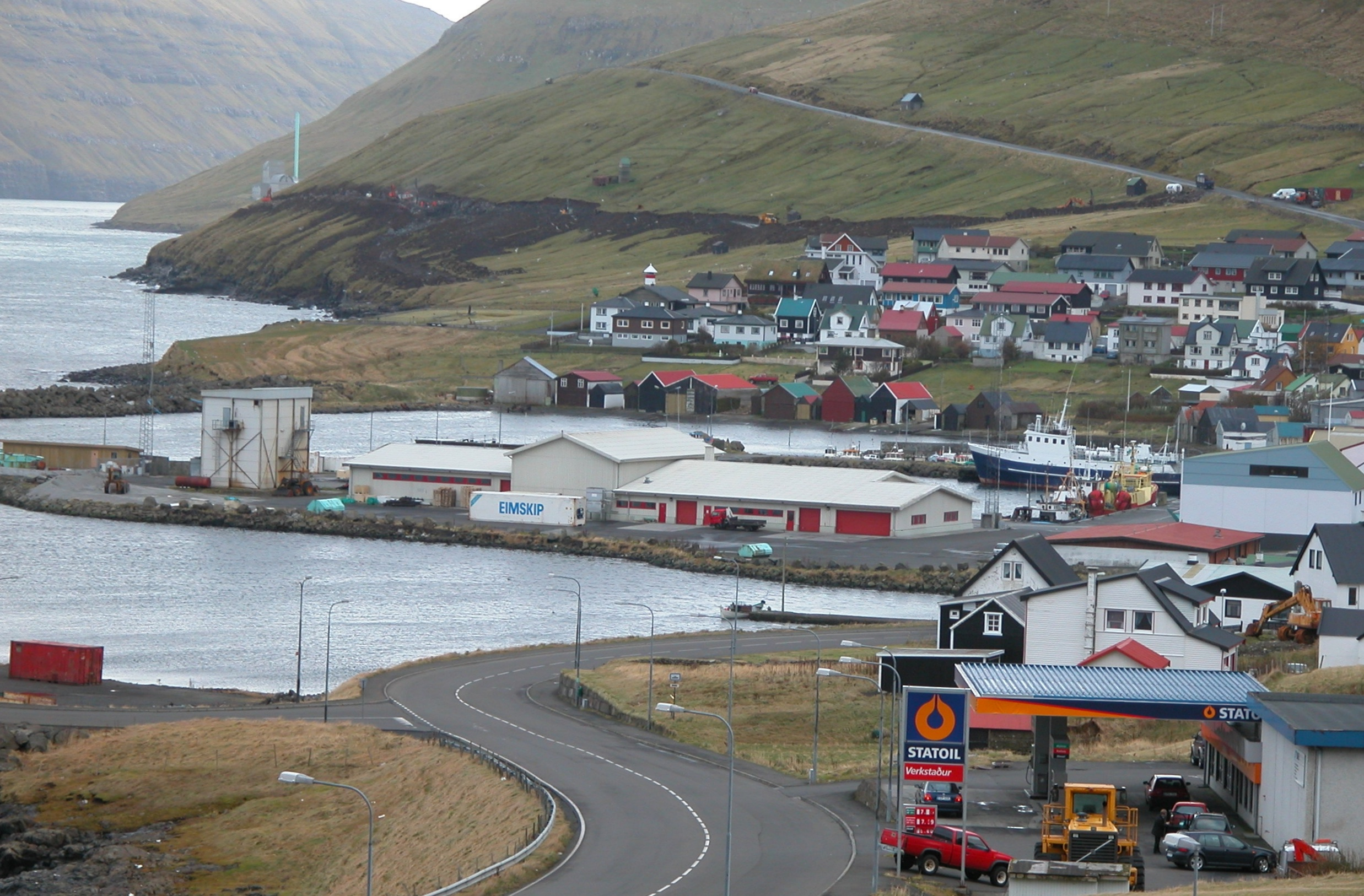
- Leirvík in May 2002

- Location in the Faroe Islands
- Coordinates: 62°12′40″N 6°42′22″W
- State: Kingdom of Denmark
- Autonomous country: Faroe Islands
- Island: Eysturoy
- Municipality: Eysturkommuna

Population (September 2025)
  - Total: 1,061
- Time zone: UTC±00:00 (WET)
  - Summer (DST): UTC+01:00 (WEST)
- Postal code: FO 520
- Climate: Cfc

Leirvík is a town on the Faroe Islands and was an important regional ferry harbour at the east coast of the second-largest island Eysturoy.

It was the only town in the municipality of Leirvík (Leirvíkar kommuna), however on 1 January 2009, it merged with Gøtu kommuna to make the new municipality called Eysturkommuna.

Leirvík is important for its fishing industry.

The Norðoyatunnilin, an underwater tunnel to Klaksvík to the east, was opened in April 2006.

A district heating system pulls heat from the sea, increases the heat in a heat pump powered by electricity, and sends the heat to the large buildings in the town.

== History ==
Archaeological excavations have shown that the town was first settled the 9th century by the Vikings. It is said that all inhabitants died in 1349 because of the Black Death.

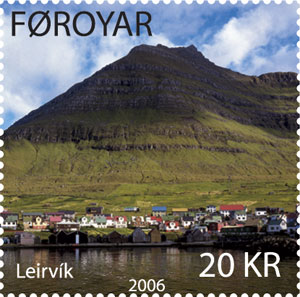
Faroese stamp FO 551 issued 13 February 2006

== See also ==
- Leirvik in Norway
- Lerwick in the Shetland Islands
- List of towns in the Faroe Islands
