= Klaksvík =

- Town
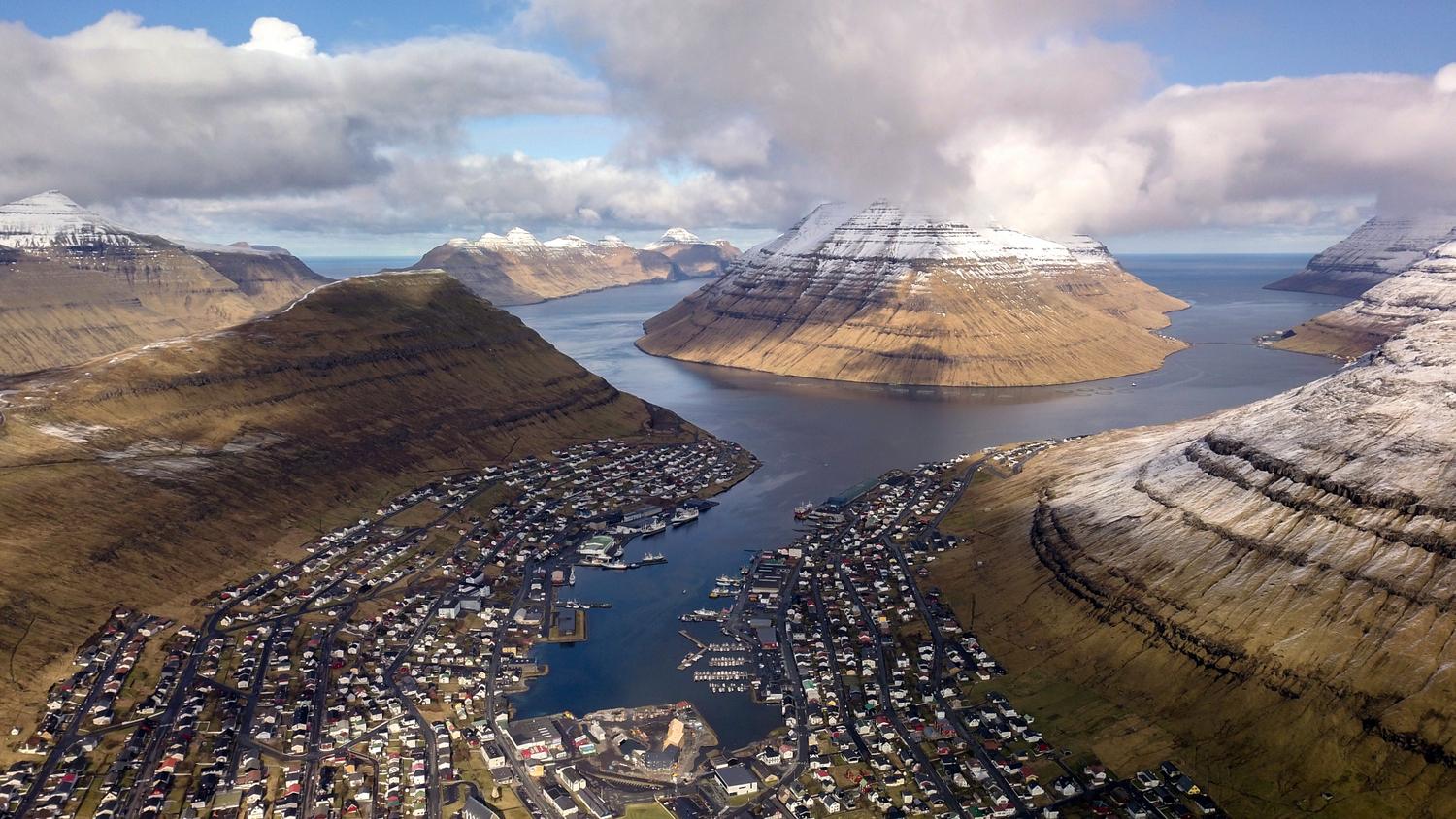
- Skyline view of Klaksvík

- Location of Klaksvík village in the Faroe Islands
- Coordinates: 62°13′26″N 6°34′43″W
- State: Kingdom of Denmark
- Constituent country: Faroe Islands
- Island: Borðoy
- Municipality: Klaksvík

Government
  - Mayor: Karl Johansen

Area
  - Total: 72 km^{2} (28 sq mi)

Population (September 2025)
  - Total: 5,123
  - Density: 71/km^{2} (180/sq mi)
- Time zone: GMT
  - Summer (DST): UTC+1 (WEST)
- Postal code: FO 700, FO 710
- Climate: Cfc
- Website: www.klaksvik.fo

Klaksvík (Faroese pronunciation: [ˈklaksˌʋʊɪk]) is the second largest town of the Faroe Islands behind Tórshavn. The town is located on Borðoy, which is one of the northernmost islands (the Norðoyar). It is the administrative centre of Klaksvík municipality.

== History ==
The first settlement at Klaksvík dates back to Viking times, but it was not until the 20th century that the district merged to form a large, modern Faroese town that became a cultural and commercial centre for the Northern Isles and the Faroe Islands as a whole.

Klaksvík is located between two inlets lying back to back. It has an important harbour with fishing industry and a modern fishing fleet. Originally, four farms were located where Klaksvík is now. In time, they grew into four villages: Vágur, Myrkjanoyri, Gerðar and Uppsalir; which finally merged to form the town of Klaksvík in 1938. What triggered the development of the town was the establishment of a centralized store for all the northern islands on the location.

The brewery Föroya Bjór in Klaksvík is a Faroese family brewery, founded in 1888. The ram has been the symbol of the brewery since the early beginning. Since August 2007, when Restorffs Bryggjarí went out of business, Föroya Bjór has been the only producer of beer and soft drinks in the Faroe Islands.

With the opening of the Leirvík sub-sea tunnel, the Norðoyatunnilin in April 2006, Klaksvík gained a physical link with the mainland of the Faroe Islands and can now be considered one of its key ports. Several developments are under way to exploit this symbiosis, including a new industrial park located by the tunnel entrance. Klaksvík is home to Summarfestivalurin.

== Notable buildings ==
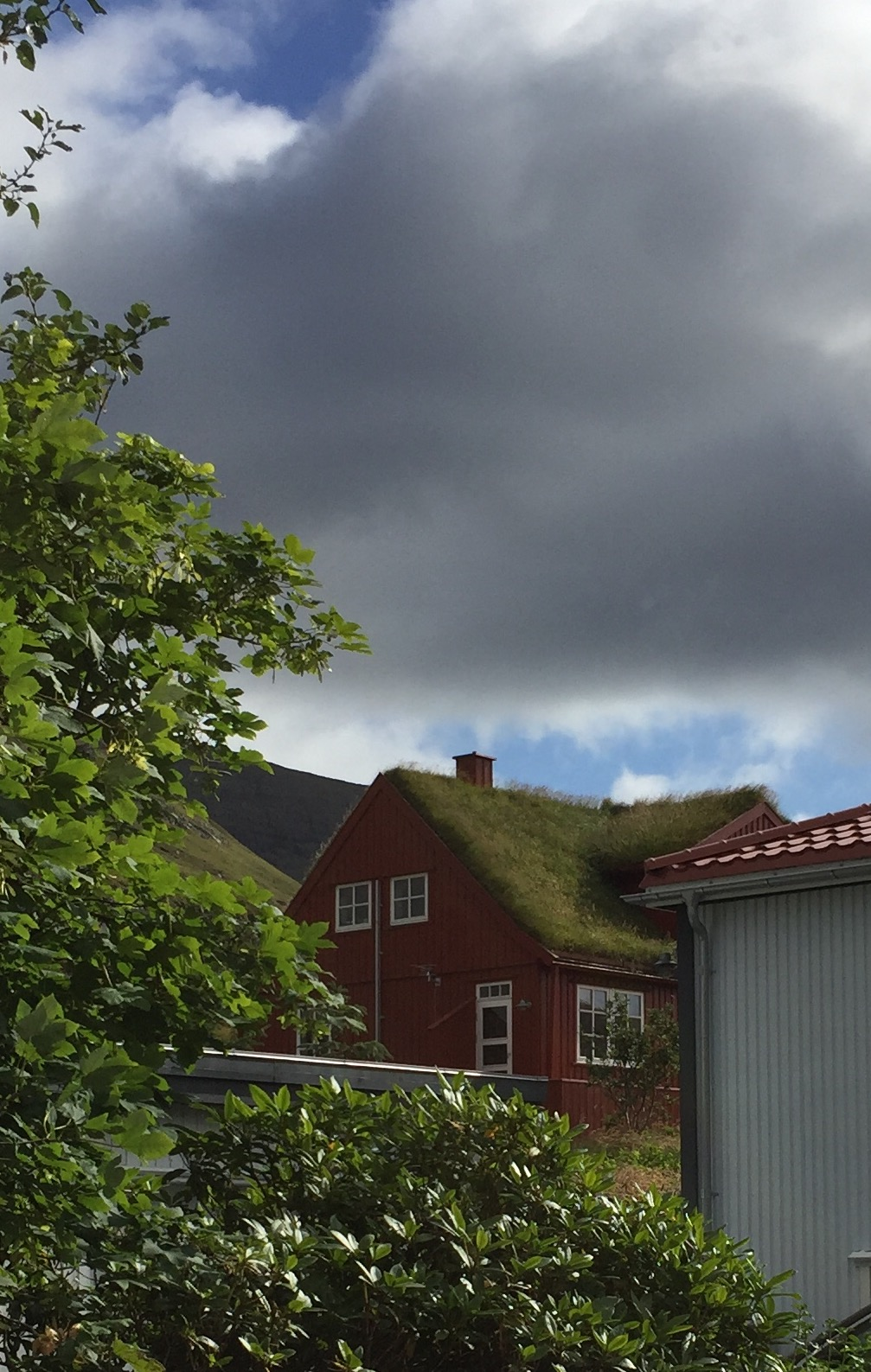
Turf-roofed house in Klaksvik

Christianskirkjan, built in 1963, is the first one in modern times in Scandinavia to be built in Norse style. The roof construction is the same as that found in the Viking halls, and which has survived in Faroese smoke rooms (kitchens) and village churches. This open roof construction has proved to be especially suitable for church buildings, as the acoustics in this church are better than in others of a similar size. The church is dedicated to the memory of the sailors who lost their lives during World War II. Hanging from the ceiling is an old 8-man rowing-boat, from Viðareiði, it was used to transport the priest between villages.

== Transport ==
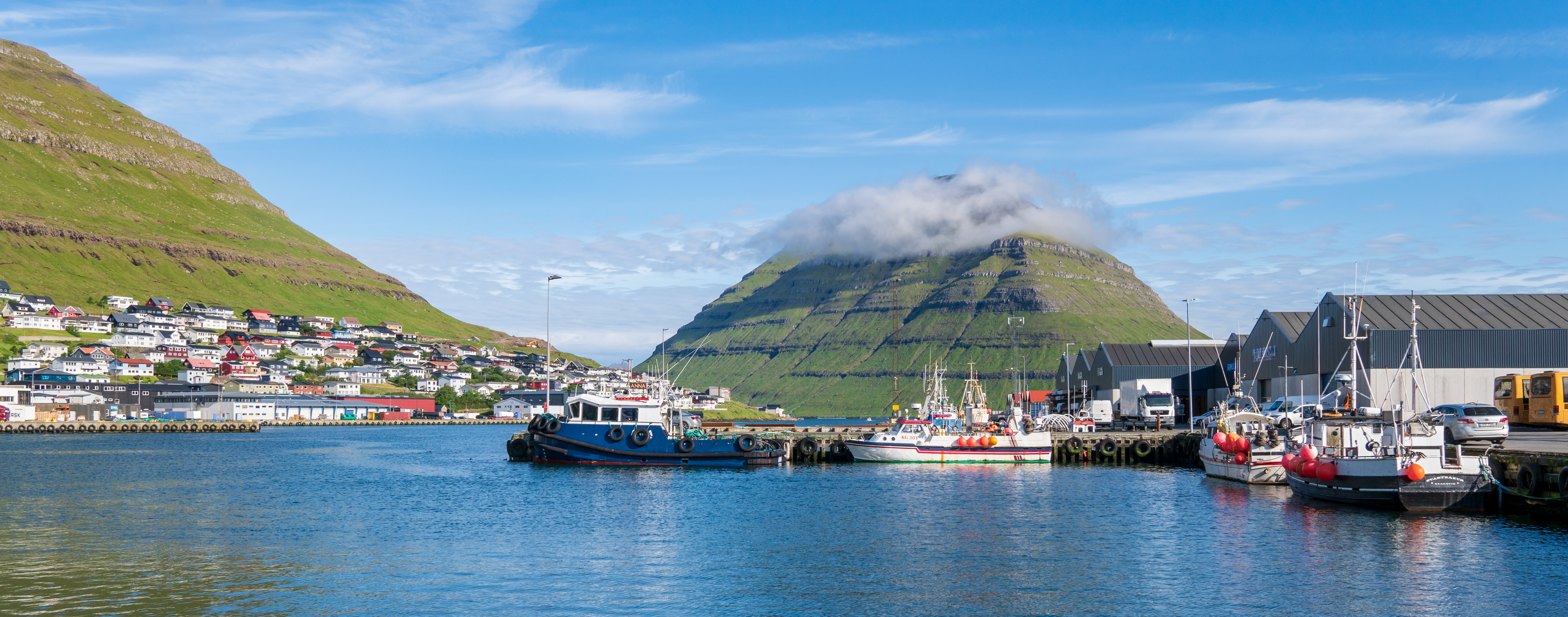
Klaksvík harbour

Klaksvík used to be an isolated town until 2006 when the Norðoyatunnilin opened. A frequent bus service now links the town to Tórshavn, while smaller services operate to Fuglafjørður, Kunoy and Viðareiði. Also it has remained the ferry port for Kalsoy. Since 2014, a city bus (Bussleiðin) connects the outlying parts with the city centre, and taxis offer additional services. The bus services and the ferry to Kalsoy are operated by Strandfaraskip Landsins, the public transport company of the Faroe Islands. There is a helipad (ICAO: EKKV) which mainly has flights to isolated islands like Fugloy and Svínoy, as well as to Tórshavn.

== Twin towns – sister cities ==
Klaksvik is twinned with:

- Sisimiut, Greenland
- Kópavogur, Iceland
- Trondheim, Norway
- Norrköping, Sweden
- Tampere, Finland
- Odense, Denmark
- Taiji, Japan since 2018
- Wick, Scotland. For twenty years the town was twinned with Wick. In August 2015, Wick councillors threatened to break these ties on account of a Faroese long standing practice which involves hunting and eating migrating pilot whales. As of January 2016 the decision has been postponed.

== Sports ==
These are some of the sporting associations in Klaksvík:

The local football club is KÍ. In August 2023, KÍ became the first Faroese side to play in the group stages of a European competition, after their win against BK Häcken in the second qualifying round of the UEFA Champions League.

The local gymnastics club is Klaksvíkar Fimleikafelag. In handball there are two clubs, one for men and another for women.

The women's handball club is Stjørnan. The men's handball club is Team Klaksvík.

Klaksvík is home to Mjølnir, the most successful volleyball club in the Faroe Islands. They have 21 championships in the women's league, and 12 championships in the men's league. In 2023, Mjølnir became the first Faroese volleyball team to complete in a European Cup. They played in the first round of CEV Challenge Cup against the Dutch side VC Limax losing both matches 3-1 and 3-0.

== See also ==
- List of towns in the Faroe Islands
