= Tangafjørður =

Strait separating the islands of Streymoy and Eysturoy in the Faroe Islands

Coordinates: 62.088°N 6.793°W

Tangafjørður is the southern part of the strait separating the islands of Streymoy and Eysturoy in the Faroe Islands. The northern part of the strait between is named Sundini.

== Name ==
Tangi, genitive case tanga, is a Faroese word meaning 'landspit', 'low eroded headland' and is cognate of English 'tongue'. This refers to Raktangi peninsula near Strendur. Tangi can also mean 'seaweed', which typically is abundant around landspits. In Faroese, fjørður can refer to any elongated body of saltwater, including a sound or strait separating two islands. Narrow sounds are referred to as sund.

== Geography ==
The northern part of the strait between Streymoy and Eysturoy is called Sundini which transitions into Tangafjørður between Norðuri í Sundum (Kollafjørdur) and Morskranes. The southern end is not precisely defined and merges with Nólsoyarfjørður strait at a line roughly between cape Eystnes (near Æðuvík on Eysturoy) and the islet of Hoyvíksholmur (near Tórshavn, Streymoy). Tangafjørður is split in a distinct northern and a southern half by two side fjords, Skálafjørður and Kaldbaksfjørður.

Tangafjørður's overall length is 12 kilometres (7.5 mi). Its southern section is wider (ca. 4.0 kilometres (2.5 mi)) than the northern section (ca. 3.0 kilometres (1.9 mi)). The deepest points of the northern and southern section are both −85 metres (−279 ft) at locations just offshore of Kolbeinagjógv and Hvítanes respectively. Where Tangafjørður flows into Nólsoyarfjørður the seafloor drops to −120 metres (−390 ft). There are shallow sections (submerged thresholds) in the entrance of the Skála- and Kaldbaksfjørður, but the Tangafjørður itself has no such threshold, governing good nutrient in- and outflow. In the middle of the "intersection" of the Kaldbaks-, Skála- and Tangafjørður are reefs and skerries which break the surface. These Flesjarnar skerries are marked by a lighthouse.

The villages on Streymoy are Kollafjørður, Kaldbak, Hvítanes and Hoyvík, part of Tórshavn. The villages on Eysturoy are Morskranes, Kolbeinagjógv, a modern residential area of Strendur (all part of Sjóvar kommuna), Toftir and Nes. Windmills near Æðuvík can be seen from Tangafjørður. There are fish farms close to Nes, Kolbeinagjógv and south of Kollafjørður.

== Transport ==
A car ferry operated between Hósvík and Selatrað until 1976. Another ferry operated between Tórshavn, Toftir and Strendur (Skálafjarðarleiðin, route 40), which ceased to operate in 2003 due to lack in demand, in competition with the more reliable connections via Streymin Bridge. In the last years it sailed two return trips a day only for foot passengers. The past two decades all transport used Streymin Bridge to northern Eysturoy. This caused a long detour for transport between southern Eysturoy and Streymoy: the distance between Hvítanes and Toftir is 5.5 kilometres (3.4 mi) as the crow flies, but 62 kilometres (39 mi) by road.

In December 2020 the Eysturoyartunnilin opened and provides a much shorter route across the Tangafjørður. An estimated 5,800 vehicles are expected to use the tunnel daily, including local traffic across the Skálafjørður. In 2011, circa 1,300 people commuted on a regular basis for work or education between the two sides of the Tangafjørður, yet were forced via Streymin Bridge.
