= Sundini =

Sound separating the islands of Streymoy and Eysturoy in the Faroe Islands

Coordinates: 62.210°N 7.007°W

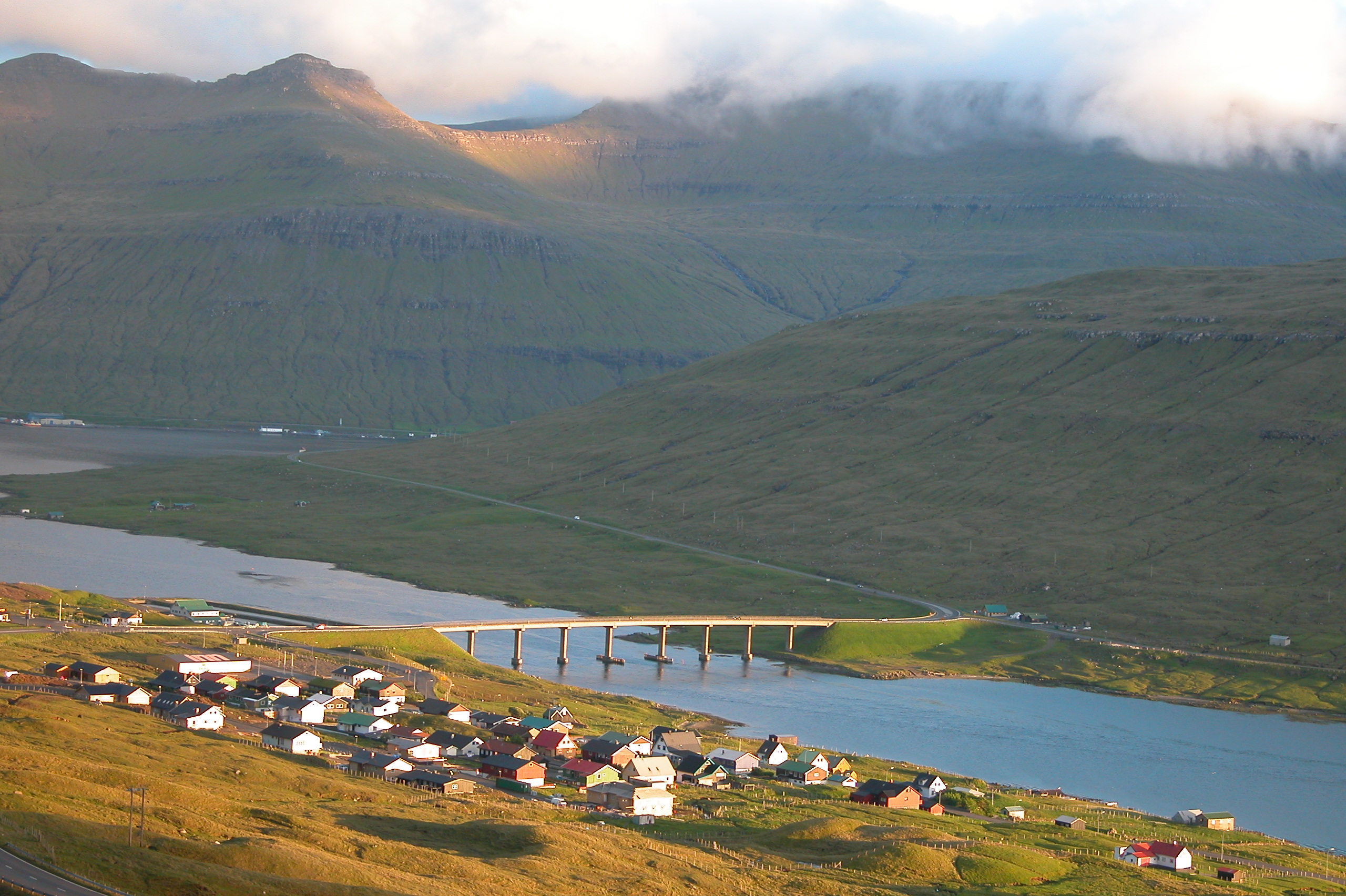
The Streymin Bridge crosses the Sundini at its narrowest point

Sundini is the northern section of the sound separating the islands of Streymoy and Eysturoy in the Faroe Islands. The southern section of the strait is named Tangafjørður.

== Name ==
Sund is the Faroese word for sound or strait. Sundini is the plural definite of Sund, hence translating as The Sounds or The Straits in English. An English equivalent is also The Narrows.

== Geography ==
The Sundini separates Streymoy and northern Eysturoy. In the north, bordering Eiðisflógvi gulf (part of the Atlantic Ocean), Sundini starts between Tjørnuvík and Eiðiskollur (near Eiði). It merges with the much wider Tangafjørður strait between Norðuri í Sundum (Kollafjørdur) and Morskranes. Its length is 25 kilometres (16 mi) in an equidistant line. The deepest point is northwest of Morskranes at −75 metres (−246 ft). Sundini is at its widest around Selatrað at 1.9 kilometres (1.2 mi). The shallowest and narrowest point is situated at Við Streymin (By the Current) underneath the Streymin Bridge. It is also the narrowest point between any two islands in the Faroe Islands. It is a dredged section kept at −4 metres (−13 ft) to allow small craft to navigate between north and south. However, these can only pass at slackwater due to the tidal currents up to 12 knots at this point.

The complex bathymetry of the Sundini and Tangafjørður, with many isolated areas exceeding −50 metres (−160 ft) intermitted by shallow sections, is thanks to the glaciation during the Weichselien ice age. The Við Streymin area constitutes a former glacial drainage divide where the glaciar would bisect in a northward and southward flow. In the northern limits near Eiði a glacial threshold (submerged terminal moraine) at ca −11 metres (−36 ft) limits the inflow of oxygenated water, hence compounding biological activity in this section. Glaciation has also indented the coastline with several inlets, such as Kollafjørður, the Skálafjørður fjords, the Hvalvík and Tjørnuvík bays, as well as Saksunardalur valley. In the south it borders the Kollafjørður and Tangafjørður strait, which border the Kaldbaksfjørdur and Skálafjørður fjords.

The villages on Streymoy are, from north to south: Tjørnuvík, Haldórsvík, Langasandur, Nesvík, Hvalvík, Streymnes, Við Áir, Hósvík and the Norðuri í Sundum neighbourhood of Kollafjørdur. The Eysturoy side houses Eiði, Ljósá, Svínáir, Norðskáli, Oyrarbakki, Oyri, Selatrað and Morskranes. The region Sundalagið owes its name to the Sundini, although the villages Selatrað and Morskranes are not traditionally considered part of this region. The Sundini is bordered by four municipalities: Sjóvar, Tórshavn, Sunda and Eiðis kommuna.

== Transport ==
Since 1973 both sides of the Sundini have been connected by the Streymin Bridge, formerly the sole fixed link between Streymoy and Eysturoy. In December 2020 a second link, the Eysturoyartunnilin, was opened, providing a much shorter bypass for the long route from Tórshavn to Southern Eysturoy via the Streymin Bridge. Until 1973, there was a ferry ('Sundaferjan') between Oyri and Streymnes, while the ferry Hósvík-Selatrað continued to operate until 1976, the year when the Norðskálatunnilin opened and for the first time offered a road link between Southern and Northern Eysturoy. A car ferry operated between Strendur, Toftir and Tórshavn until the early 2000s.

Nearly all of Sundini's shorelines are paralleled by highways. The national highway nr 10 runs from Tórshavn via Kollafjørður to Oyrarbakki, where it continues to Southern Eysturoy and Klaksvík. National highways nr 54 and 23 run north from Streymin Bridge to Tjørnuvík and Eiði respectively. Highway nr 65 runs from Selatrað to Strendur. The section Oyri-Selatrað consists of vertical cliffs and has no road link. Strandfaraskip Landsins offers bus connections to all villages except Oyri, while municipal bus services operate in Kollafjørður and Sunda.

== Culture ==
The Sundalagsstevna is the annual regional festival with rowing races, alternating between Kollafjørður, Hósvík and Hvalvík. A park has been created next to Streymin Bridge near Norðskáli. Three bays are appointed as hvalvág where pilot whales may be brought ashore during a grind: Hvalvík, Norðskáli and Tjørnuvík, as well as in Kollafjørður. There are fish farms around Haldórsvík and Oyrarbakki.
