= Sunda, Faroe Islands =

Sunda
- Municipality
- Sunda Municipality; Sunda kommuna (Faroese)
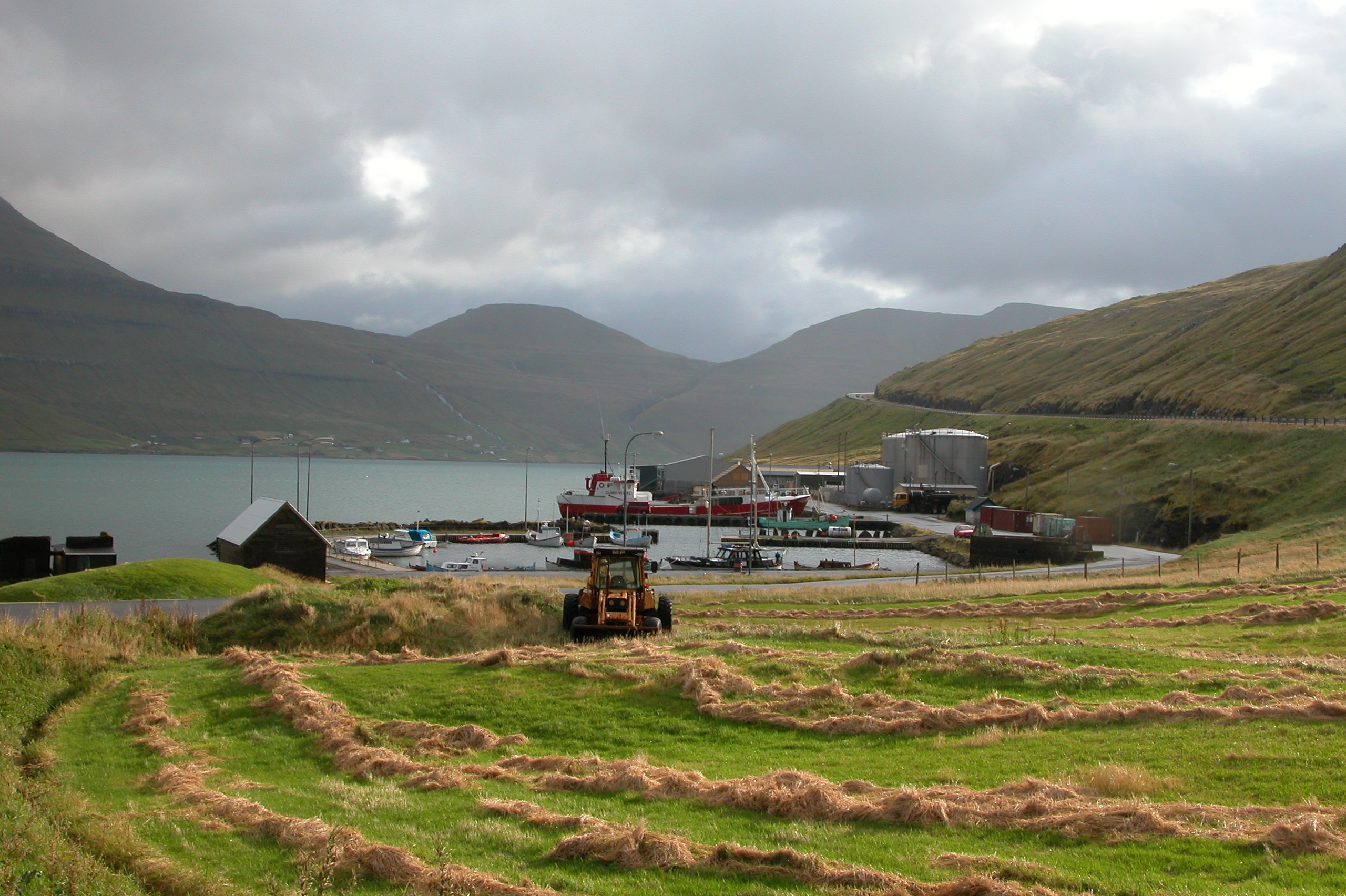
- Hósvík village within the municipality

- Logo

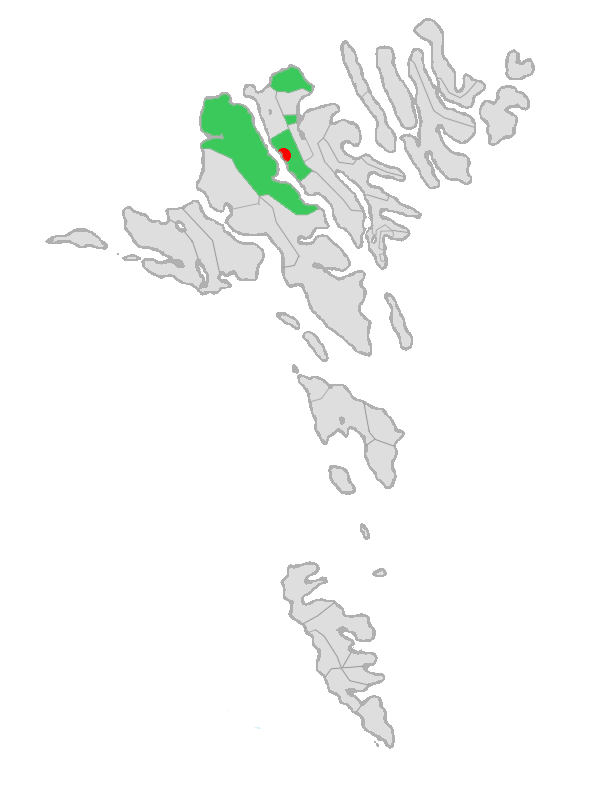
- Location in the Faroe Islands
- Coordinates: 62°9′N 6°56′W
- State: Denmark
- Constituent country: Faroe Islands
- Islands: Streymoy and Eysturoy

Government
  - Type: Municipality
  - Mayor: Jógvan Kruse

Area
  - Total: 59.3 sq mi (153.6 km^{2})

Population (January 2024)
  - Total: 1,828
  - Density: 30.82/sq mi (11.90/km^{2})
- Time zone: GMT
  - Summer (DST): UTC+1 (WEST)
- Website: https://sunda.fo/

Sunda is a municipality in the Faroe Islands, loosely centered around the Sundini sound between the islands of Streymoy and Eysturoy.

== History ==
Sunda is an amalgamation of the former municipalities of Hósvíkar, Hvalvíkar, Saksunar, Haldarsvíkar, (former) Sunda and Gjáar kommuna, which merged in 2005. The mayor as of 2020 is Heðin Zachariasen, who was also the first mayor, from 2005 to 2009.

== Geography ==
The region in which Sunda kommuna is situated is referred to as Sundalagið, centered around the Sundini (The Narrows) between the islands of Streymoy and Eysturoy. The region also includes Eiðis kommuna, while strictly speaking Gjógv does not belong to Sundalagið, though is part of Sunda kommuna. The villages Selatrað, Morskranes and Kolbeinagjógv are also situated on the Sundini but not considered part of Sundalagið region.

Sunda kommuna contains the following villages:

- Hósvík
- Norðskáli
- Hvalvík
- Streymnes
- Haldórsvík
- Oyri
- Oyrarbakki
- Tjørnuvík
- Gjógv
- Langasandur
- Saksun
- Nesvík

The municipality is centrally located in the country, situated in the middle of highway 10 between capital Tórshavn and second city Klaksvík. Both cities are 40 kilometers by road from Oyrarbakki. The eastern and western bank of Sundini are connected by the Streymin Bridge. This is the only road link between these islands until the Eysturoyartunnilin has finished and opened in 2021. National bus service 400 connects Tórshavn, Oyrarbakki and Klaksvík up to 11 times on weekdays in either direction, with less frequent routes to Tjørnuvík, Eiði and Gjógv operating from Oyrarbakki weekdays-only. How Sunda will be connected to Tórshavn and Klaksvík by public transport in the future, when the Eysturoyartunnilin has rearranged route 400, remains unknown. A free citizen-only bus service operated by Sunda kommuna connects all villages except Saksun and Gjógv.

== Population ==
As of January 2024, there were 1,828 inhabitants. The population is steadily rising, up from 1.386 in 2000. The Sundalagið as a whole (including Eiðis kommuna and Gjógv) had 2,572 inhabitants in 2020. The area is popular for its central location in the country, at commuting distance from all major towns.

== Photos ==
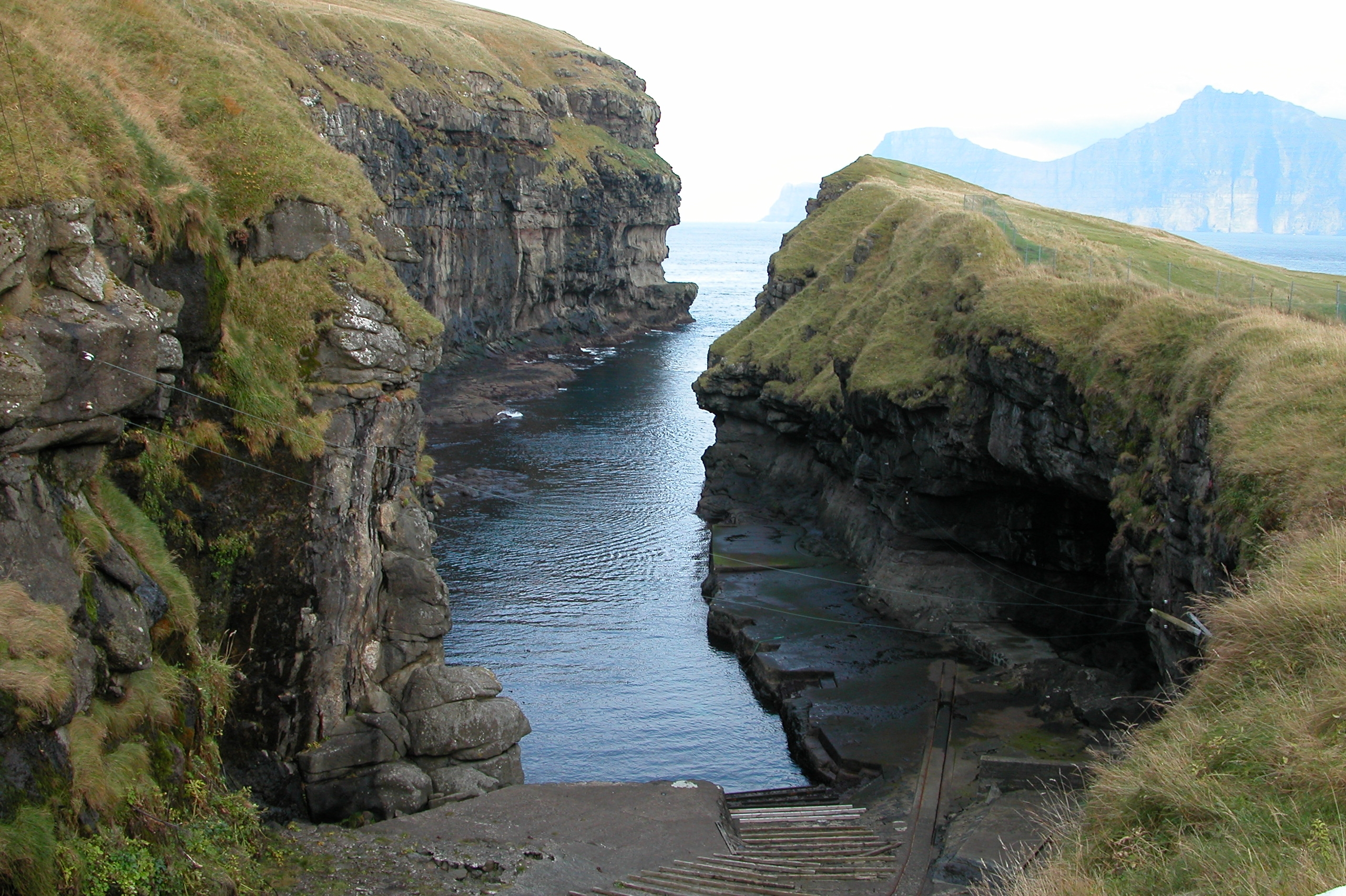
The boat harbour in the gorge of Gjógv, north Eysturoy.

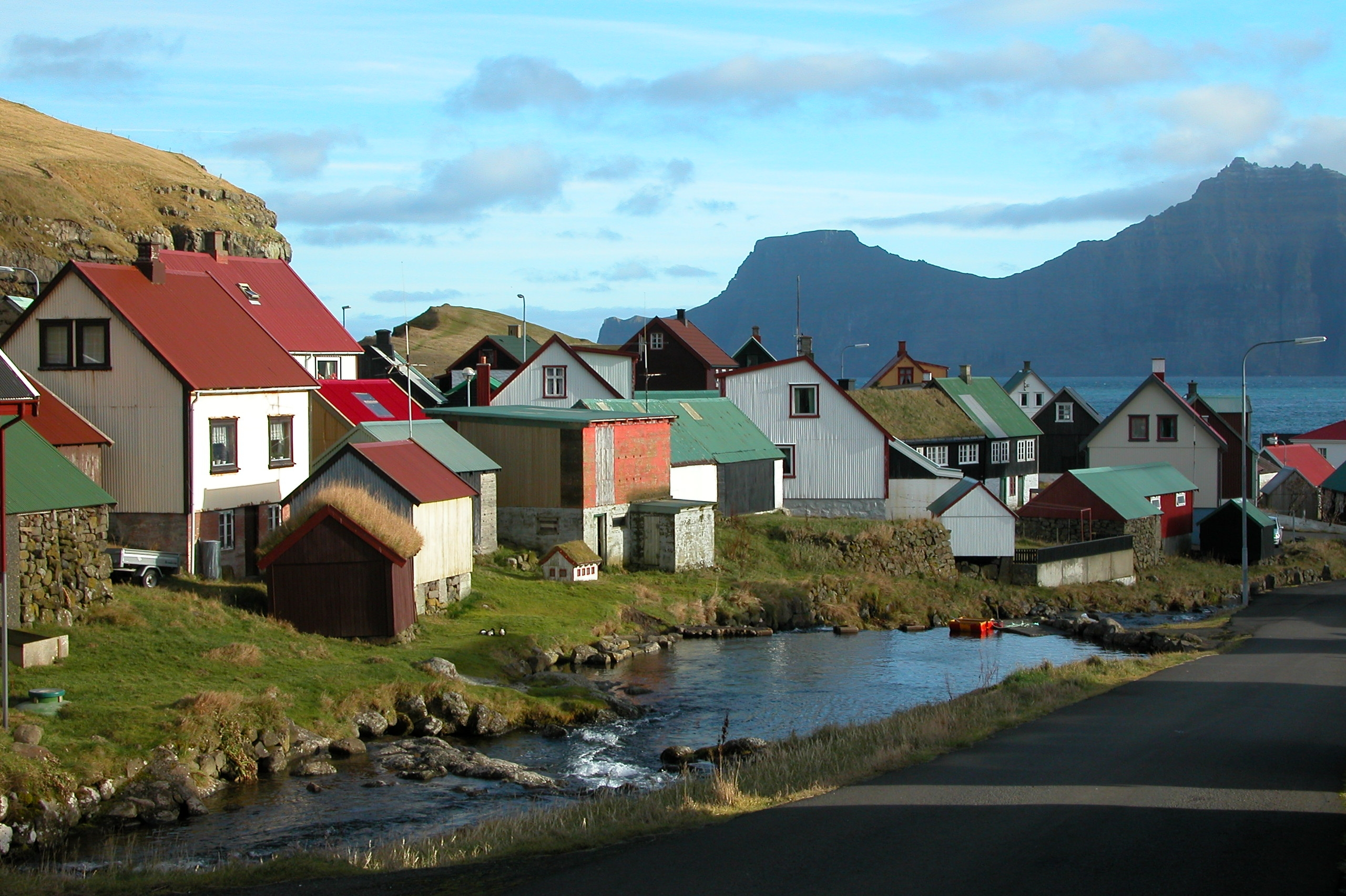
The village of Gjógv, the island Kalsoy is in the background.

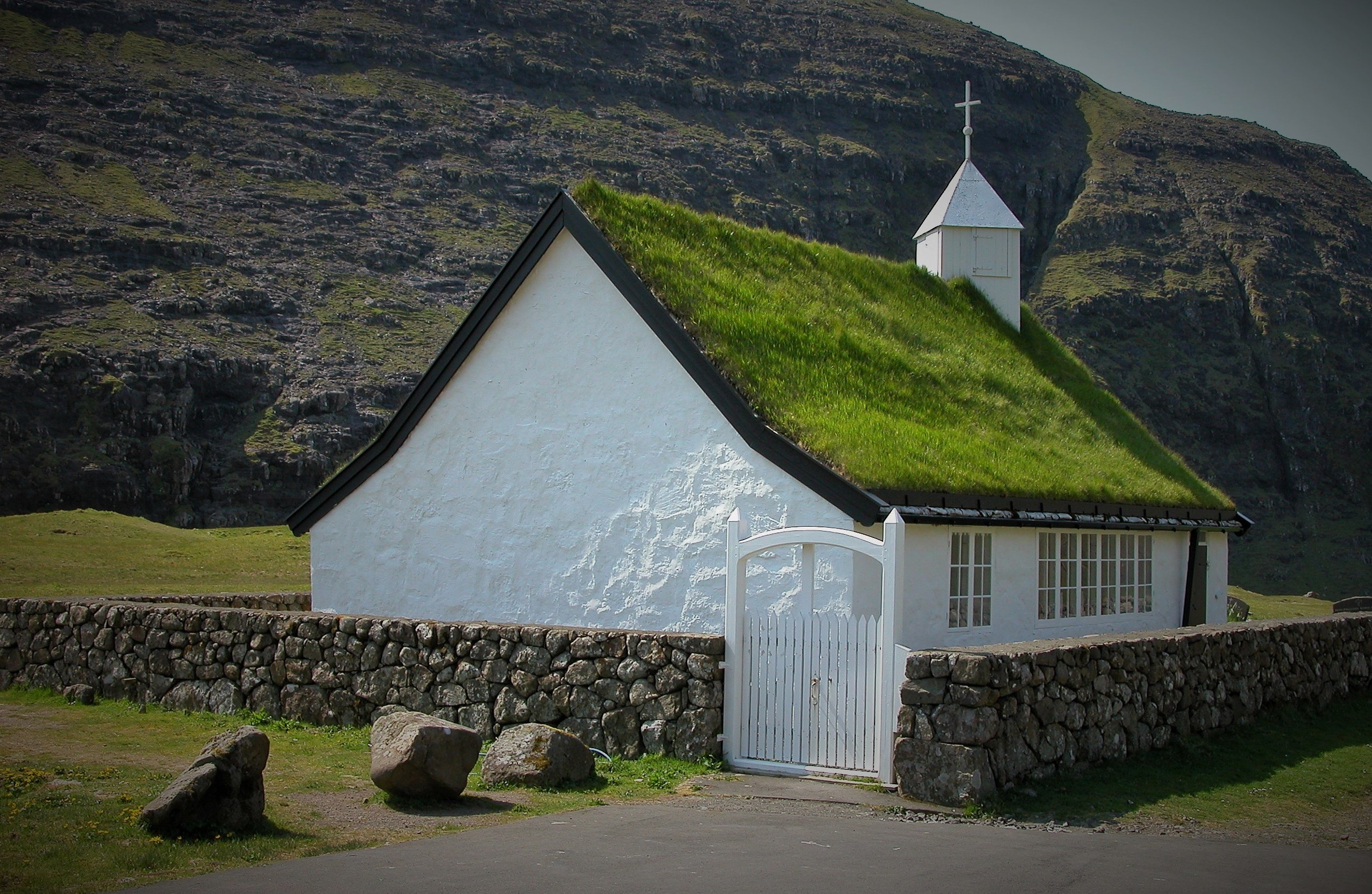
The church of Saksun in north Streymoy

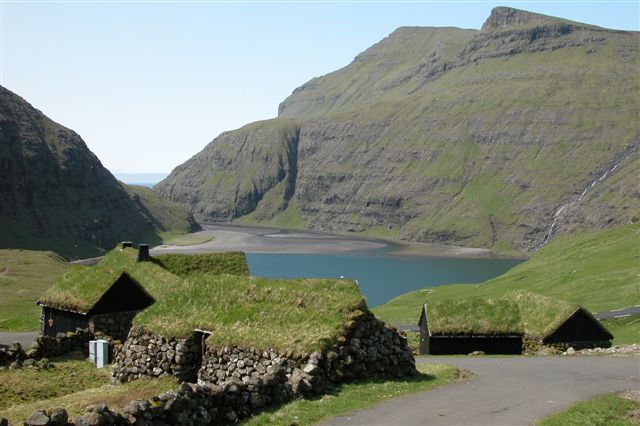
Saksun

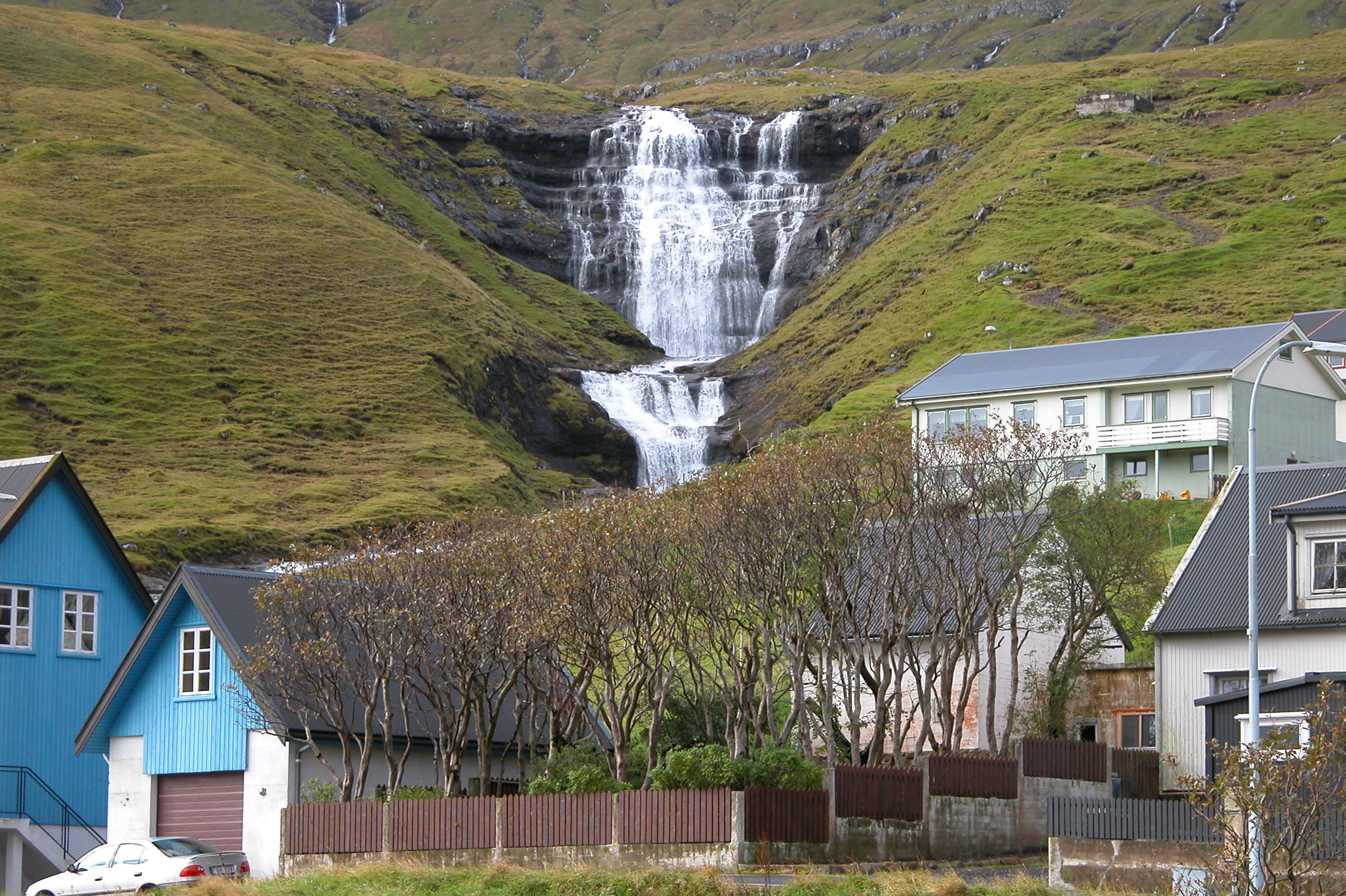
Waterfall in Hósvík

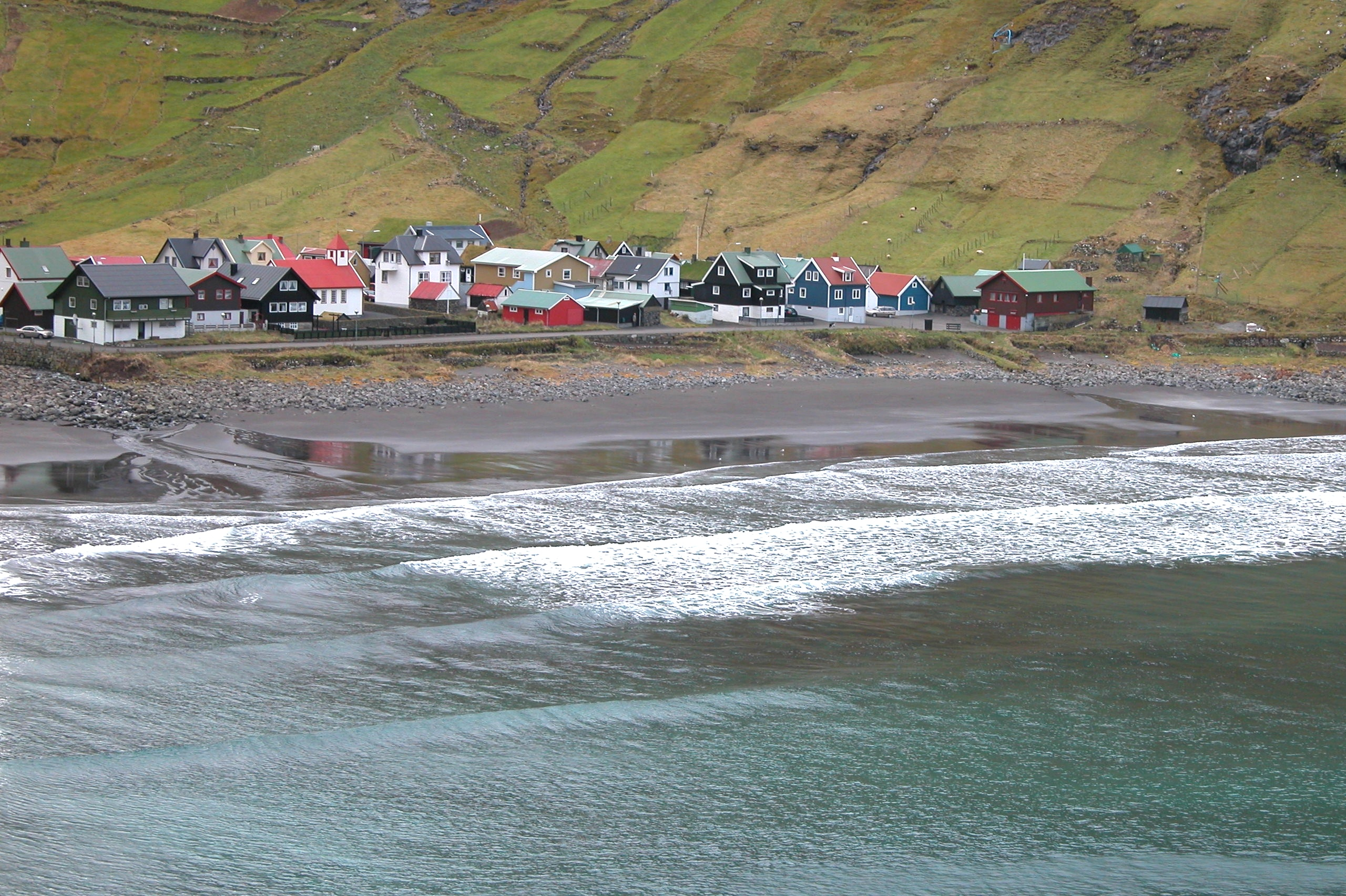
Tjørnuvík in north Streymoy.

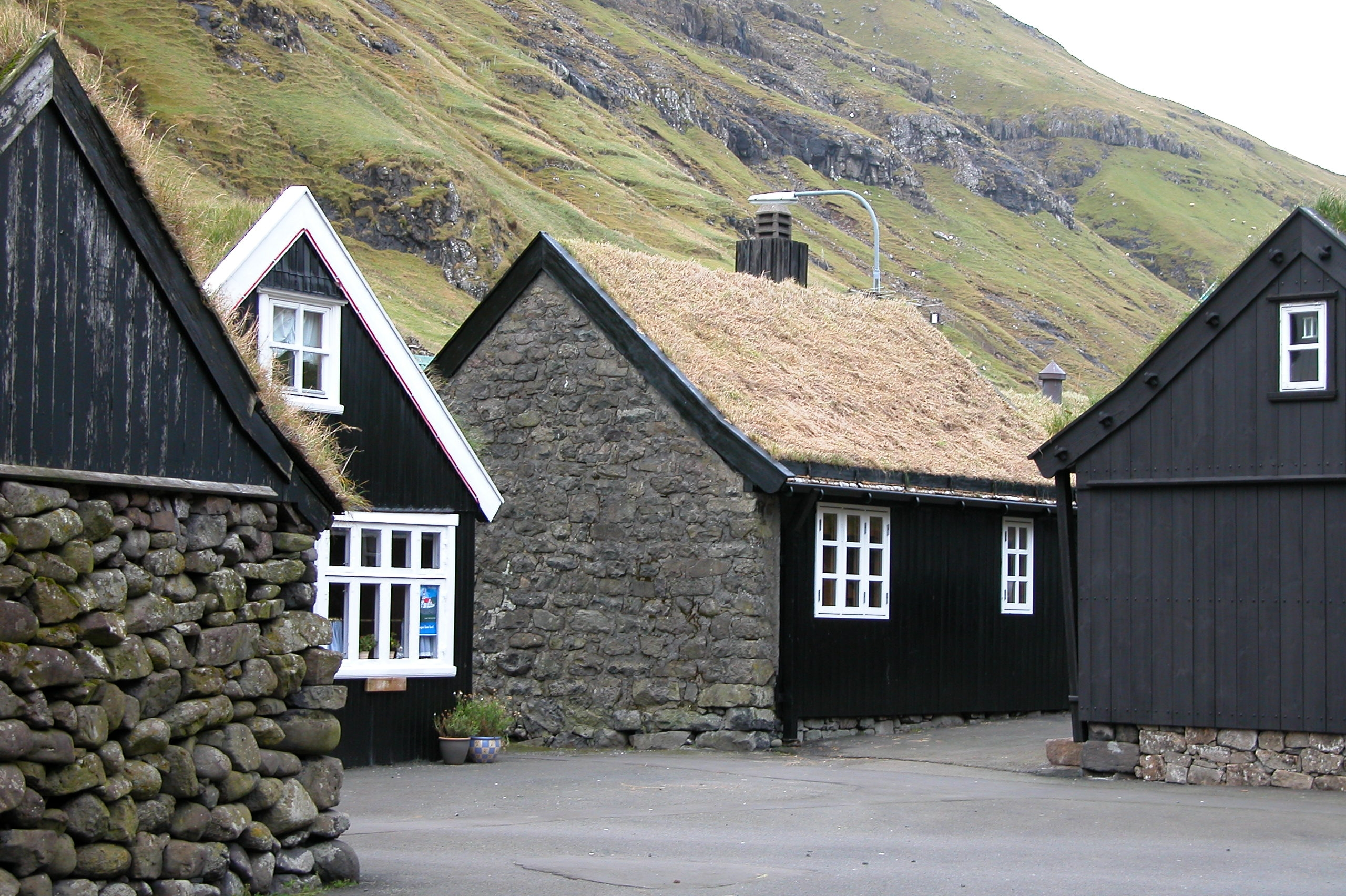
Old wooden houses with turf roof in Tjørnuvík.

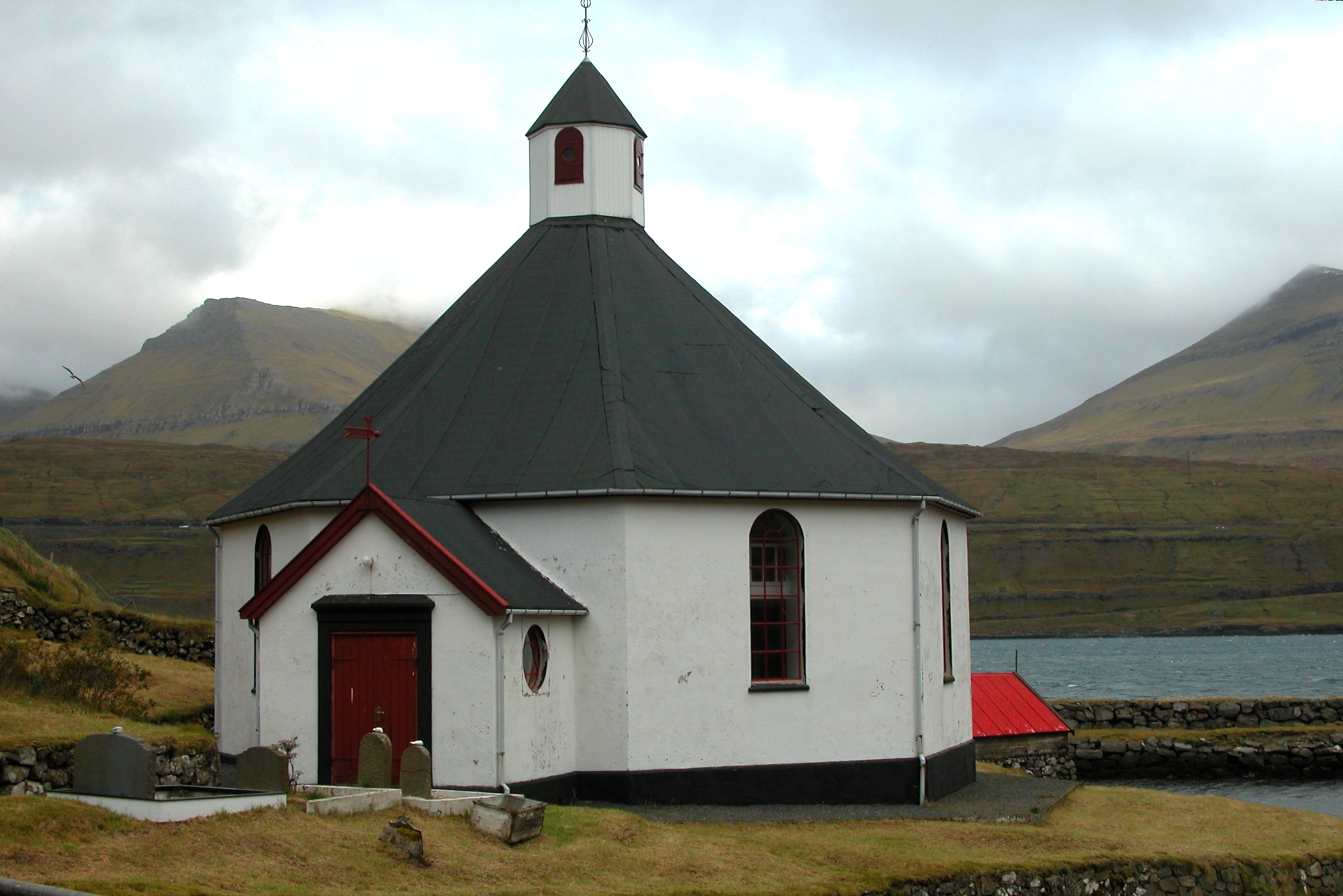
The octagonal church in Haldarsvík in north Streymoy.
