= Eysturoyartunnilin =

Undersea road tunnel under the Tangafjørður sound in the Faroe Islands

Coordinates: 62.0736°N 6.7768°W

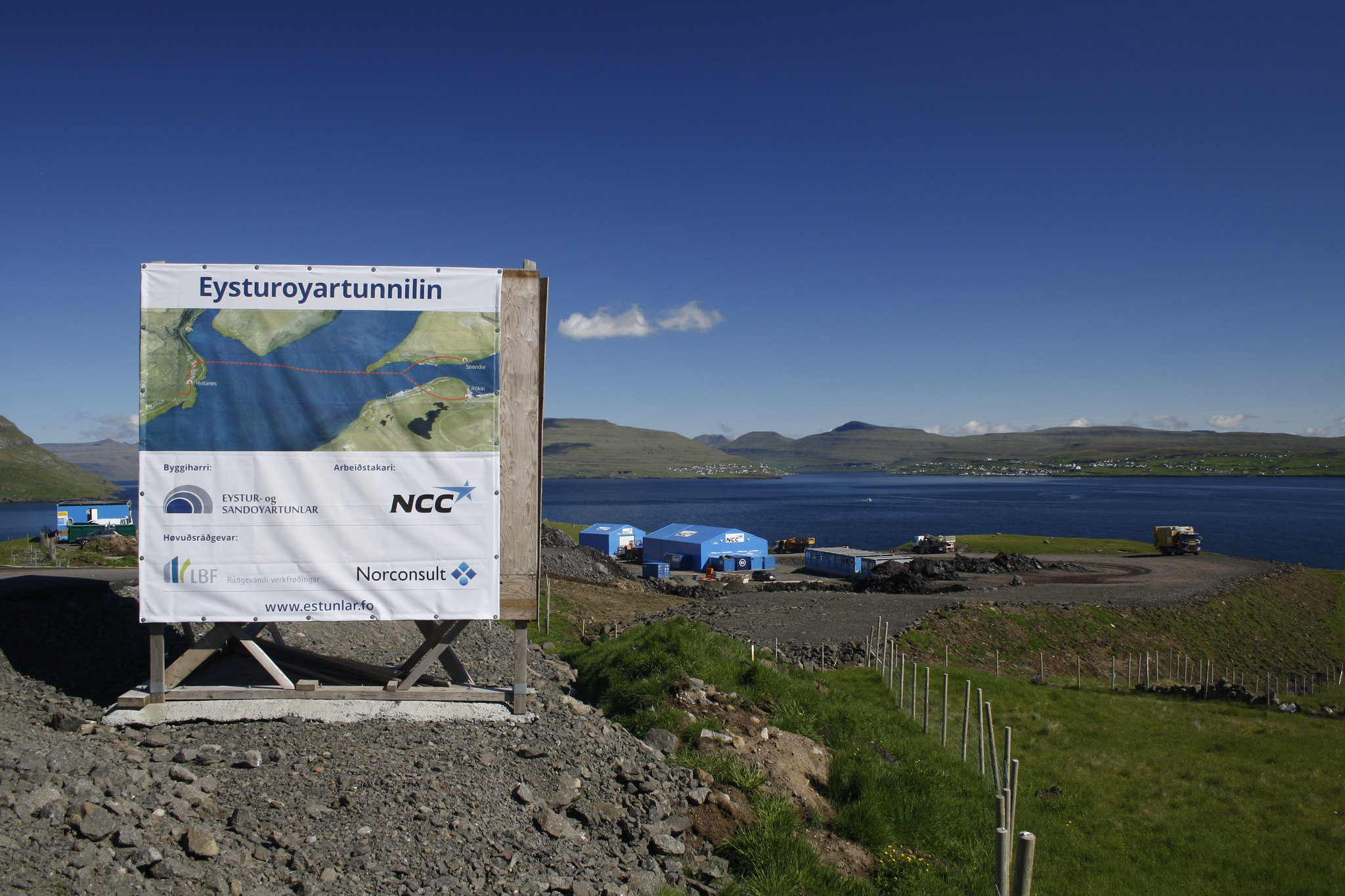
- A construction site at Hvítanes, 2017, overlooking the Tangafjørður strait under which the tunnel is situated
- Interactive map of Eysturoyartunnilin

Overview
- Location: Skálafjørður and Tórshavn, Faroe Islands
- Status: In operation

Operation
- Work began: 2016; 10 years ago
- Opened: 19 December 2020; 5 years ago
- Owner: Faroese Government
- Operator: P/F Eystur- og Sandoyartunlar
- Traffic: Automotive
- Toll: Yes
- Vehicles per day: 6,386 (2025)

Technical
- Length: 11,238 m (36,870 ft)
- No. of lanes: 2
- Operating speed: 80 km/h (50 mph)
- Max elevation: 21.6 m (70 ft 10 in)
- Min elevation: −189.0 m (−620 ft 1 in)
- Tunnel clearance: 4.6 m (15 ft 1 in)
- Width: 10.5 m (34 ft)
- Grade: 5 % (maximum)

The Eysturoy Tunnel (Eysturoyartunnilin, previously known as Skálafjarðartunnilin) is a large undersea road tunnel under the Tangafjørður sound in the Faroe Islands, connecting the island of Streymoy to the island of Eysturoy. It also crosses the southern part of Skálafjørður, and connects the towns of Runavík on the eastern side and Strendur on the western side of the fjord, and includes the world's first undersea roundabout in the middle of the network.

It is the largest ever infrastructure project in the Faroe Islands. Altogether, the three-branch subsea tunnel is 11.24 kilometres (6.98 mi) long, including the roundabout. Construction costs are estimated to be around 1 billion kr. The roundabout features artwork, including large sculptures and light effects. The tunnel opened for traffic in December 2020.

== History ==
The idea for the Eysturoyartunnil emerged during the construction of Vágatunnilin and Norðoyatunnilin, which opened in 2002 and 2006, which heralded a new look on domestic transport and regional development. In 2006, the private company P/F Skálafjarðartunnilin was founded to build this tunnel. Due to the 2008 financial crisis, it took the stakeholders several years to materialize the plans and get political support. The tunnel was included in the 2012 national mobility plan, which abandoned the name Skálafjarðartunnilin and thereafter exclusively named it Eysturoyartunnilin.

In June 2013, another private company, P/F Eysturoyartunnilin, was established in order to pursue a deal between the Faroese national government, the Faroese insurance company LÍV and the Danish-owned Copenhagen Infrastructure Partners (CIP). CIP made secret arrangements with the Faroese minister for transport, Kári P. Højgaard, who had to resign in early September as this became public. This led to a small political crisis. In 2015, after the outcome of an official inquiry, the cabinet of Kaj Leo Johannesen had to call for early elections. Both P/F Skálafjarðartunnilin and P/F Eysturoyartunnilin were liquidated in 2015, after about two years of inactivity.

Meanwhile, in the aftermath of the political crisis of 2013, a special commission drafted a proposal for a public rather than a private solution. This proposal was supported by all parties and in 2014 led to the establishment of a public company, P/F Eystur- og Sandoyartunlar (in short 'EStunlar' or EST). This company, owned entirely by the Ministry of Transport, builds, owns and manages both the Eysturoyartunnil and the Sandoyartunnil. NCC was contracted to carry out the construction works for both tunnels.

The financial coupling (cross subsidization) between the two tunnels is necessary since Sandoyartunnilin is not expected to generate sufficient ridership to recover its own investment via its own tolls alone, while Eysturoyartunnilin is expected to have surplus capacity. As a result, the tolls for Eysturoyartunnilin will not decrease as traffic numbers increase (price inelasticity). Only when the construction investments for both tunnels have been sufficiently been earned back could tolls be reduced. This differs from Vága- and Norðoyatunnilin where tolls dropped gradually with time. Another difference is that Eysturoyartunnilin does not replace a ferry route, so tolls cannot be compared to ferry ticket prices.

== Construction ==
In November 2016, a deal was struck with the Scandinavian construction company NCC to construct the Eysturoy tunnel and the Sandoy tunnel. The contract for both tunnels is for 2,073 million kr.. The overall cost for both tunnels is estimated at around 2,600 million kr.

The drilling of the tunnel started on 21 February from the Strendur side and on 27 April 2017 from the Hvítanes side. The Strendur team reached the underwater roundabout section on 4 December 2017, at which point 3,059 metres (10,036 ft) had been dug from both sides combined.

With the first leg and roundabout completed, a third drilling team started, with two teams on the Hvítanes-roundabout leg working towards each other, which met underwater on 7 June 2019, and one from the roundabout to Saltnes. The last blast occurred in June 2019, after which tarmacking, cabling, installing emergency facilities and signposting took several months. Meanwhile, NCC moved the tunnel boring machine to Sandoyartunnilin, which started on 27 June 2019.

While the expected opening date was 1 December 2020, due to technical delays and COVID-19 this was postponed to 19 December 2020.

== Specifications ==
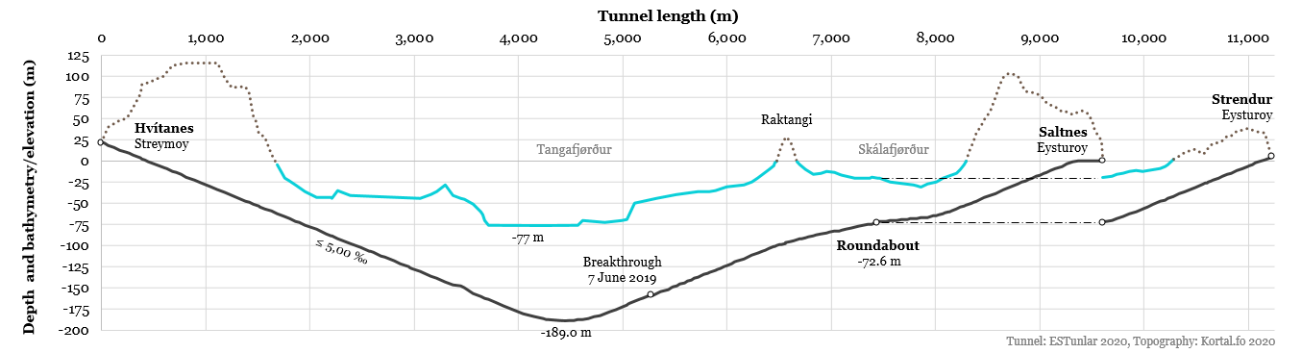
A depth diagram of the Eysturoyartunnilin.

The tunnel is a two-laned undersea tunnel with three tubes that meet at an underwater roundabout, 72.6 metres (238 ft) below the surface of the Skálafjørður fjord. The tunnel is 2,153 metres (7,064 ft) long from the entrance at Rókini in Saltnes to the roundabout, and the distance from Sjógv at Strendur to the roundabout is 1,625 metres (5,331 ft). The main branch from Tórshavn to the roundabout measures 7,460 metres (24,480 ft) and resurfaces by the village of Hvítanes.

This results in an overall road length of 11,238 metres (36,870 ft), making it currently the 2nd-longest subsea road tunnel in the world, surpassed only by the Ryfast tunnel at Stavanger in Norway. The roundabout is the world's first subsea roundabout.

In order to increase safety, no incline in the tunnel is steeper than 5 per cent, and the lowest point is 189 metres (620 ft) below the water's surface.

== Art in the tunnel ==
The roundabout is fitted with metal artwork by the Faroese artist Tróndur Patursson, as well as lighting effects. The artwork is an 80-metre (260 ft) piece custom-made for the tunnel, featuring a combination of human silhouettes and light effects. The metal plates will be allowed to oxidise and change colour. Norðoyatunnilin, which opened in 2006, also includes some of Patursson's light art. Each tunnel portal features a sequence of freestanding concrete and lit arches, as landmarks.

== The opening ==
The opening of the tunnel for general traffic was on 19 December 2020, 18 years after the opening of the first subsea tunnel in the Faroe Islands, Vágatunnilin connecting Tórshavn with Vágar Airport. For Eysturoyartunnilin there was a ceremony with speeches and music before the tunnel opened, which was broadcast live by the Faroese Television KVF. Emergency response vehicles had been allowed to use the tunnel a few months before opening.

== Impact ==
When the tunnel opened in December 2020, it significantly reduced travel times to the capital. The tunnel shortened the travel distance from Tórshavn to Runavík/Strendur from 55 kilometres (34 mi) to 17 kilometres (11 mi). The 64-minute drive was cut to 16 minutes. The drive from Tórshavn to Klaksvík was reduced from 68 minutes to 36 minutes. Similar to the impacts of the two existing subsea tunnels, an intensification of traffic, interaction and regional integration is expected to result from the increased accessibility, on both the local, regional and national scale. On the Eysturoy side of the tunnel house prices increased by 31% between 2019 and 2020 and have doubled between 2015 and 2020.

Strandfaraskip Landsins changed its bus route network in response to the tunnel's opening, but was pressed by the public along the route to restore the old network after a few months. This means that the trunk route 400 connecting Klaksvík to Tórshavn remains taking the old, 30-minute-longer route via Sundalagið. A rush-hour express service (route 401) between Klaksvík and Tórshavn was inserted that uses the Eysturoyartunnil, and a much more frequent 'Tunnel route' (route 450) between Tórshavn, Strendur and Toftir/Runavík, from where route 440 connects to villages along the Skálafjørður fjord.

Passengers between Tórshavn and Klaksvík can opt for either a transfer-free longer route (route 400), or save about 30 minutes by taking either the express route (rush hours on working days) or a double-transfer trip (routes 450 Tórshavn-Runavík, 440 Runavík-Søldarfjørður and 400 Søldarfjørður-Klaksvík).

The national government and Runavik municipality agreed on the construction of a bypass between the tunnel mouth and the town limits of Glyvrar, in order to alleviate the increasing traffic through the town streets once the tunnel has opened. This road, named Fjøruvegurin (lit. 'foreshore road'), is going to be built on the shoreline. The budget for a new express way between Hvítanes and Tórshavn, Innkomuvegurin, was agreed on by the national government and Tórshavn Municipality in June 2021. The road includes a short tunnel (Húsareynstunnilin) and opened on 6 July 2025.

== Tolls and traffic numbers ==
In December 2020, the toll prices were announced by the agency Tunnil. For cars with a toll registration (hald), the initial tolls in March 2021 on the section Streymoy-Eysturoy ranged from 175 kr. for a small car (up to 3,500 kilograms or 7,700 pounds) and 150 kr. for vans to 400 kr. for lorries and 1250 kr. for large buses (19 seats or more). For local traffic between Saltnes and Strendur, the fees were 25 kr., 50 kr., 100 kr. and 750 kr., respectively.

Tolls are levied for travel in both directions, unlike Vágatunnilin and Norðoyatunnilin, which charge tolls only one way. Tunnil claims that the saved travel time, fuel and wear compensates for the increased travel costs on the main routes between Tórshavn, southern Eysturoy and the northern isles. The financial compensation for commuters (ferðastuðul) was extended to include a compensation of 8.45 kr. per leg for the Eysturoyartunnilin tolls.

The projected traffic numbers were 6,000 for 2022. 5,100 were between Eysturoy and Streymoy and 900 between both sides of the Skálafjørður. The tunnel would generate 3,600 new daily crossings. Apart from the opening day travel of 14,700 vehicles in twelve hours and the toll-free introduction month that ended on 10 January 2021, with an average daily ridership 7,500 vehicles, traffic numbers dropped steeply. The first week which included night-time closures for maintenance saw 3,151 vehicles per day. The second week saw 3,647 vehicles per day, and the third week 3,764 vehicles per day. In July the ridership was 4,500 vehicles. These numbers include all directions on both Streymoy-Eysturoy and Saltnes-Strendur itineraries.

The lower-than-expected ridership raises questions about the financial outlook for both Eysturoyar- and Sandoyartunnilin. Public pressure is mounting to reduce the fees in order to raise ridership. Opponents of the high tolls claim to prefer the old, longer route. Along this route through the Sundalagið, a traffic count in the Norðskálatunnil suggests about 900 cars continue to use the old route.

Ridership between November 2024 and October 2025 averaged 6,386 vehicles per day.

== See also ==
- List of tunnels in the Faroe Islands
- Vágatunnilin
- Norðoyatunnilin
- Sandoyartunnilin
- Suðuroyartunnilin
- Skálafjørður
