= Stevna =

Summer festival in the Faroe Islands

A stevna (plural: stevnur) is a regional summer festival in the Faroe Islands, usually accompanied by or built around national rowing boat championships. The races and regattas are always held on Saturdays, except the Ólavsøka race in the capital of Tórshavn, which has a fixed date. There are seven official rowing-related stevnur:

== Stevnur in the Faroe Islands ==
- Norðoyastevna is held annually in Klaksvík, usually in the first weekend of June.
- Eystanstevna is held in Runavík the second weekend of June every year, and has a rowing race every other year. In the odd years (2005, 2007 etc.) the race is held at the Varmakelda.
- Sundalagsstevna is held in a weekend in mid-June in the Sundalagið region. The host town alternates between Kollafjørður, Hósvík and Hvalvík.
- Jóansøka is in the last weekend of June, or the Saturday nearest to 24 June, which is St John's Day. In the even years it is held in Vágur and in the odd years in Tvøroyri.
- Varmakelda is usually the first weekend in July in Fuglafjørður. A rowing race is held every odd year; in the other years it is held in Runavík.
- Vestanstevna is usually a weekend in the first half of July, and shifts between the three towns of Sandavágur, Miðvágur and Sørvágur.
- Fjarðastevna is celebrated in a weekend somewhere mid-July. In the even years it is held in Vestmanna, whereas in the odd years the host town alternates between Strendur and Skáli.
- Ólavsøka is the national holiday of the Faroe Islands with many festivities of all kinds in the capital of Tórshavn, including the opening of Parliament. Whereas the other stevnur tend to be more-less regional festivals, this stevna is a national event. It is held on 29 July, while the rowing championships are held the day before.

Other stevnur, which do not include rowing regattas, are held in various places, such as the Útoyggjastevna for all the outpost islands, the Sandoyarstevna on Sandoy, and boating festivals for modern boats in various places.
