= Nes, Eysturoy =

Nes Næs
- Village
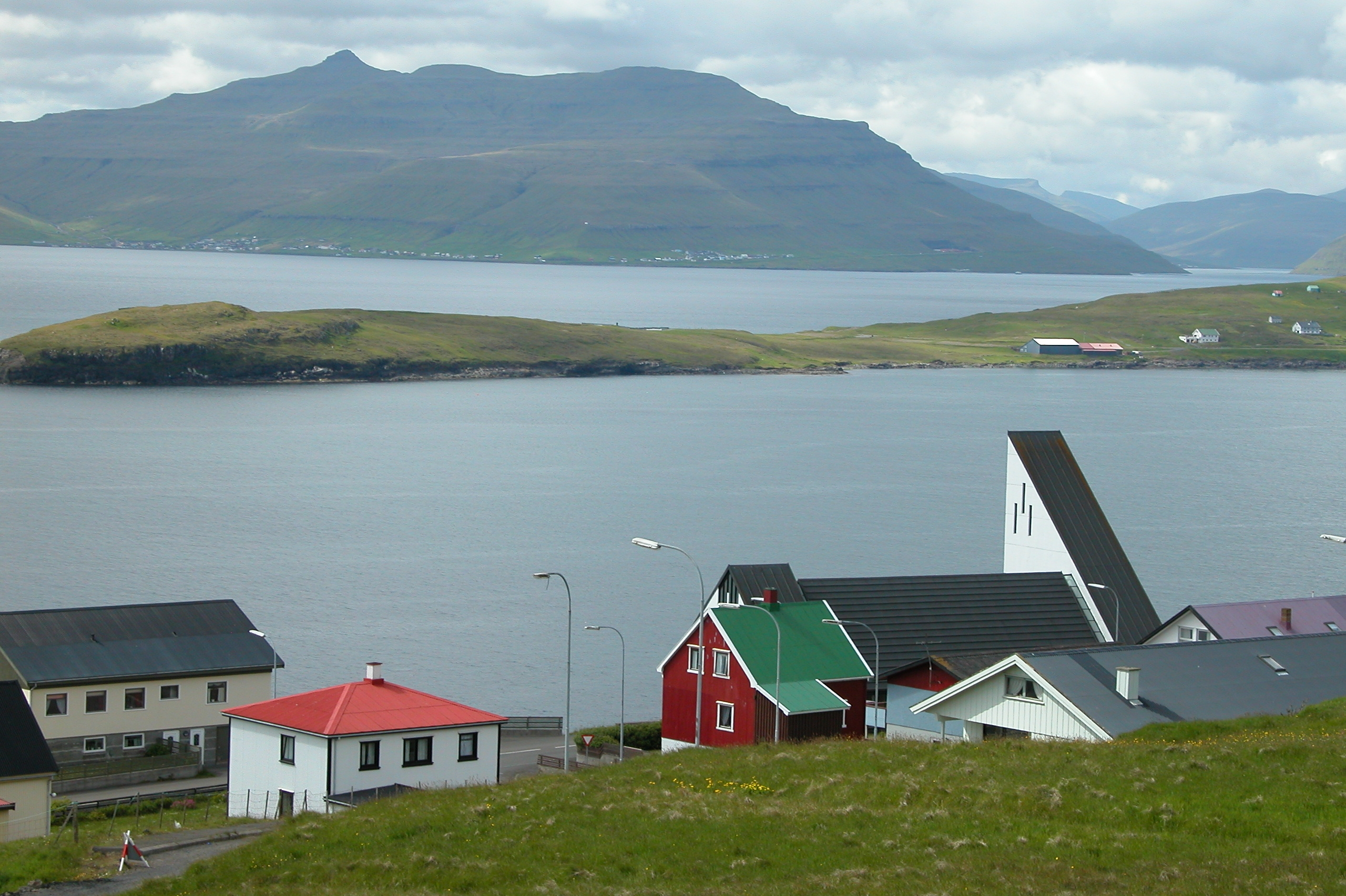
- Nes

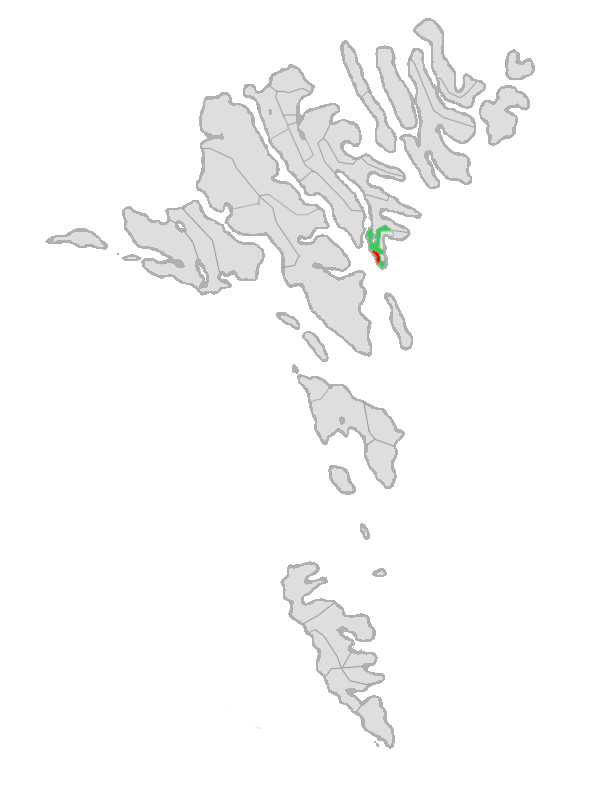
- Location of Nes kommuna in the Faroe Islands

- Location of Nes village in the Faroe Islands
- Coordinates: 62°04′47″N 6°42′28″W
- State: Kingdom of Denmark
- Constituent country: Faroe Islands
- Island: Eysturoy

Population (September 2025)
  - Total: 374
- Time zone: GMT
  - Summer (DST): UTC+1 (EST)
- Postal code: FO 655
- Climate: Cfc

Nes (Danish: Næs) is a village in Nes Municipality on the southwest coast of the Faroese island of Eysturoy.

== History ==
The 2005 population of the village of Nes was 230. Besides Nes, the two other towns of Toftir and Saltnes are part of Nes Municipality, which has a total population of 1,267 (as of 31.09.2009). Its postal code is FO 655. Nes was the site of a British military installation during World War II. Nes means cape in the Faroese language, a word related to the English word ness with the same meaning.

== Frederik's Church in Nes ==
Frederick's Church (Fríðrikskirkjan) was designed by the Faroese architect Høgni Würdig Larsen and was completed on November 27, 1994. It was named in honour of clergyman Fríðrikur Petersen (April 22, 1853 - April 27, 1917) who had served as dean in Nes from 1900 to 1917.

== Noted natives and residents ==
- Heine Havreki, (ca. 1514 - 1576) Norwegian born Parish priest
- V.U. Hammershaimb, (1819-1909), Linguist, Lutheran priest and Rural Dean
- Fríðrikur Petersen, (1853-1917), Lutheran priest, Rural Dean, Poet, Member of Parliament

== See also ==
- List of towns in the Faroe Islands
