= Nes Municipality (Faroe Islands) =

Nes Municipality Nes kommuna (Faroese)
- Municipality
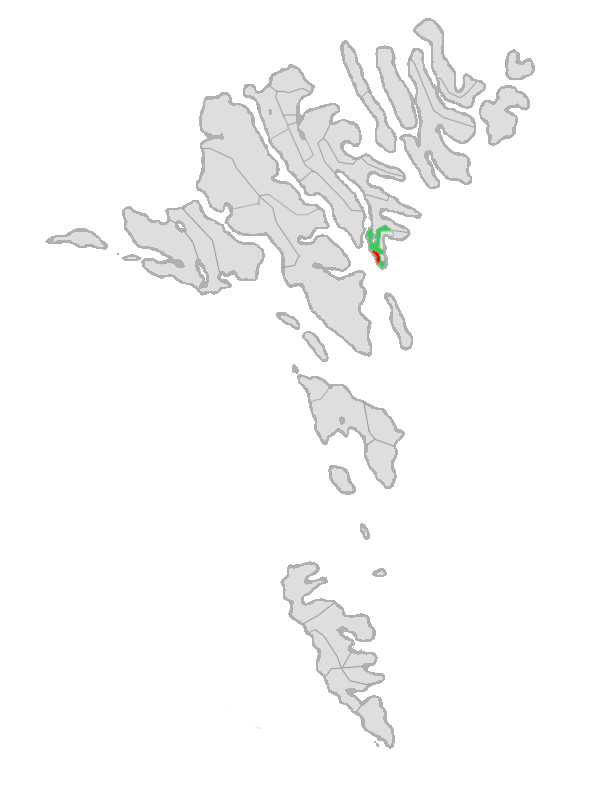
- Location of Nes kommuna in the Faroe Islands
- Coordinates: 62°5′20″N 6°44′8″W
- Country: Denmark
- Autonomous province: Faroe Islands
- Island: Eysturoy

Area
  - Total: 5.36 sq mi (13.88 km^{2})

Population (January 2024)
  - Total: 1,536
  - Density: 286.6/sq mi (110.7/km^{2})
- Time zone: GMT
  - Summer (DST): UTC+1 (WEST)
- Postal code: FO 650

Nes Municipality in the Faroe Islands comprises three villages, Nes, Toftir and Saltnes.
