= Streymnes =

Streymnes Strømnæs (Danish)
- Village
- Location in the Faroe Islands
- Coordinates: 62°11′30″N 7°2′00″W
- State: Kingdom of Denmark
- Country: Faroe Islands
- Island: Streymoy
- Municipality: Sunda

Population (September 2025)
  - Total: 321
- Time zone: GMT
  - Summer (DST): UTC+1 (EST)
- Postal code: FO 435
- Climate: Cfc

Streymnes (Danish: Strømnæs) is a village on the eastern coast of the Faroese island of Streymoy in Sunda Municipality.

The 2015 population was 270. Its postal code is FO 435. It is near the site of a former Norwegian whaling station active from 1893 to 1927.

Streymnes is the northern half of a twin-village situated on both sides of the valley. The villages are divided by the river Stórá. The southern half which is approximately the same size is called Hvalvík. Together the two villages have a population of more than 400 inhabitants.

Hvalvík-Streymnes is a village that has grown rapidly during the past years, mainly because of its proximity to the capital Tórshavn.

== See also ==
- List of towns in the Faroe Islands
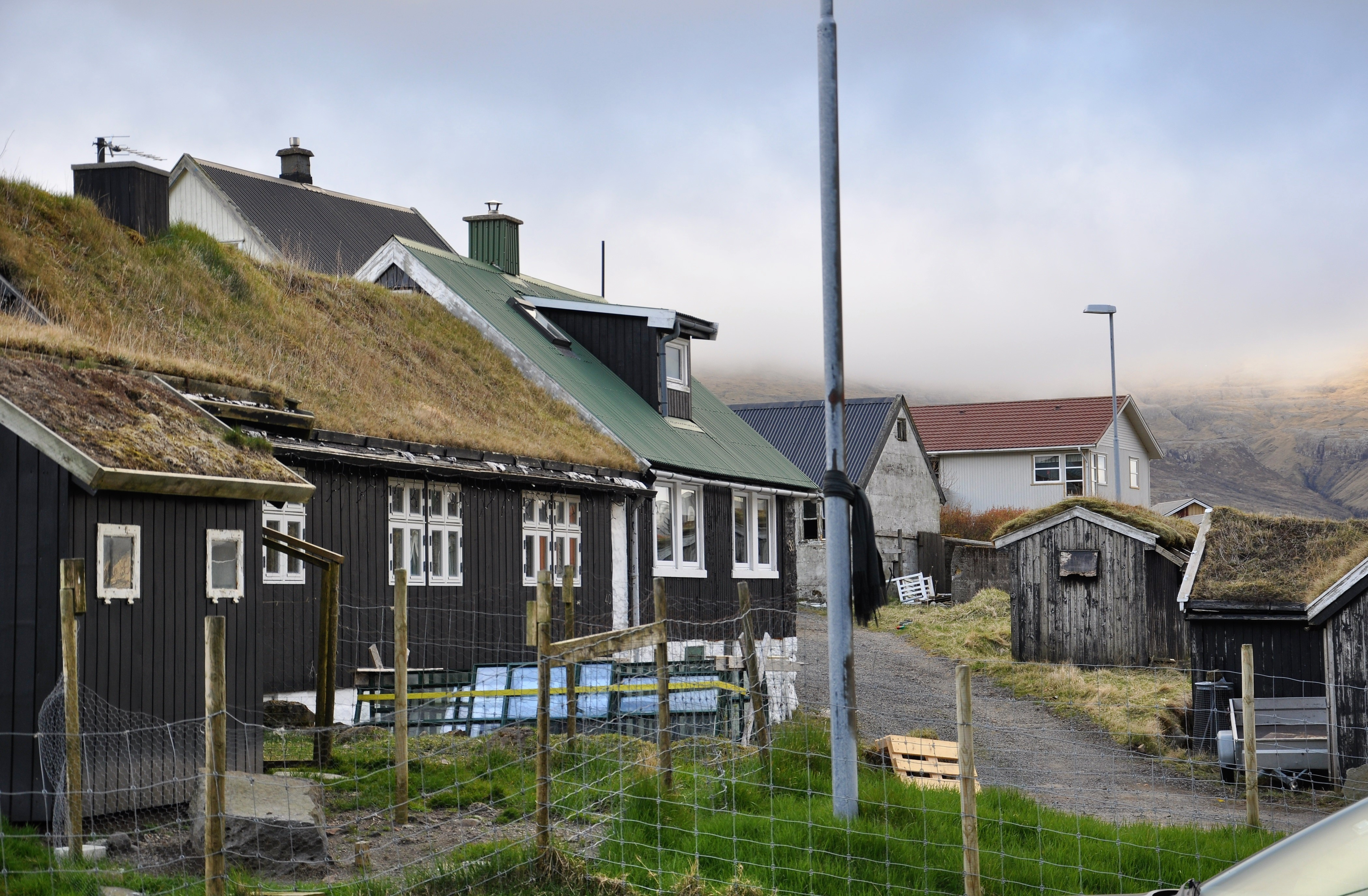
In the village center

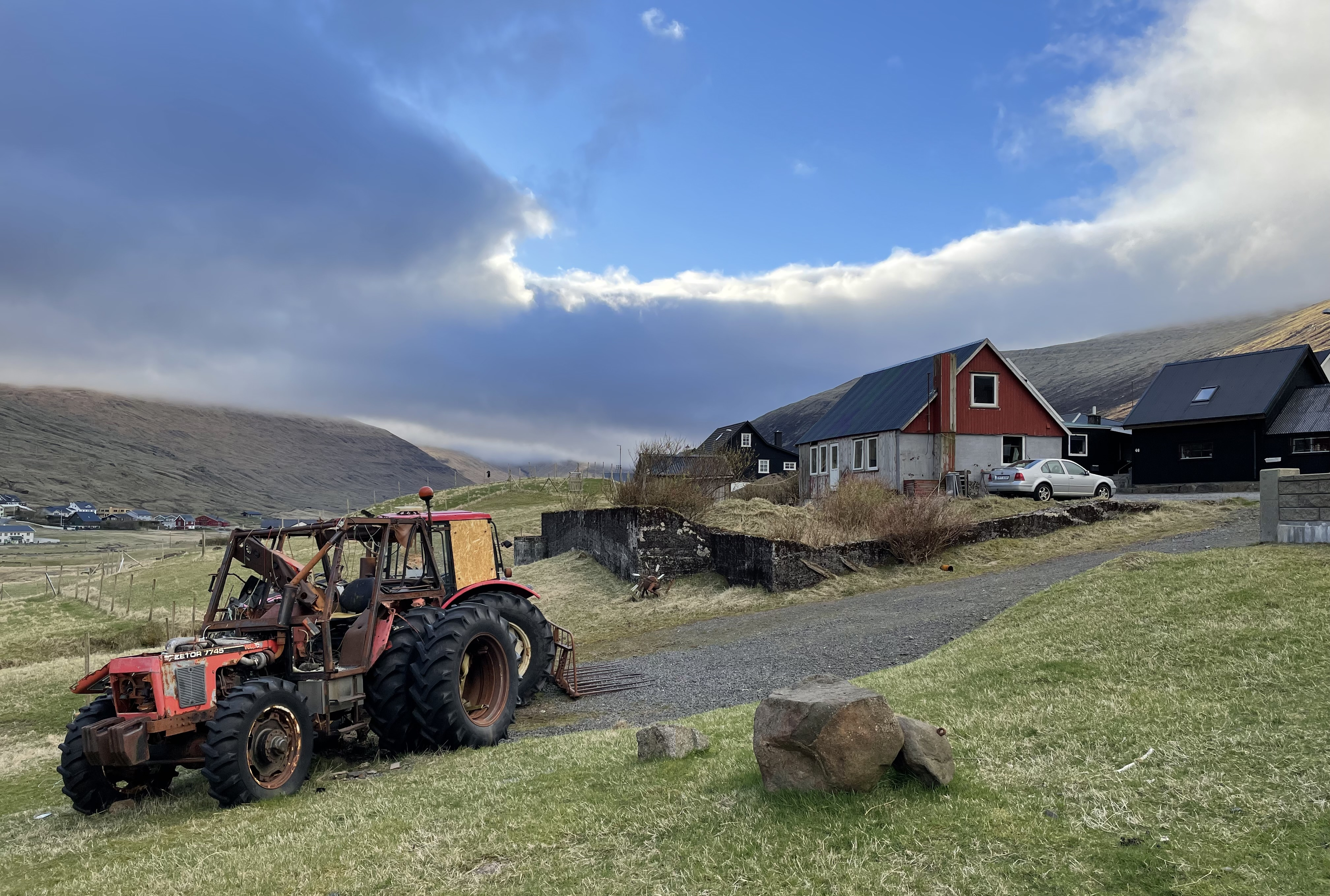
Abandoned tractors

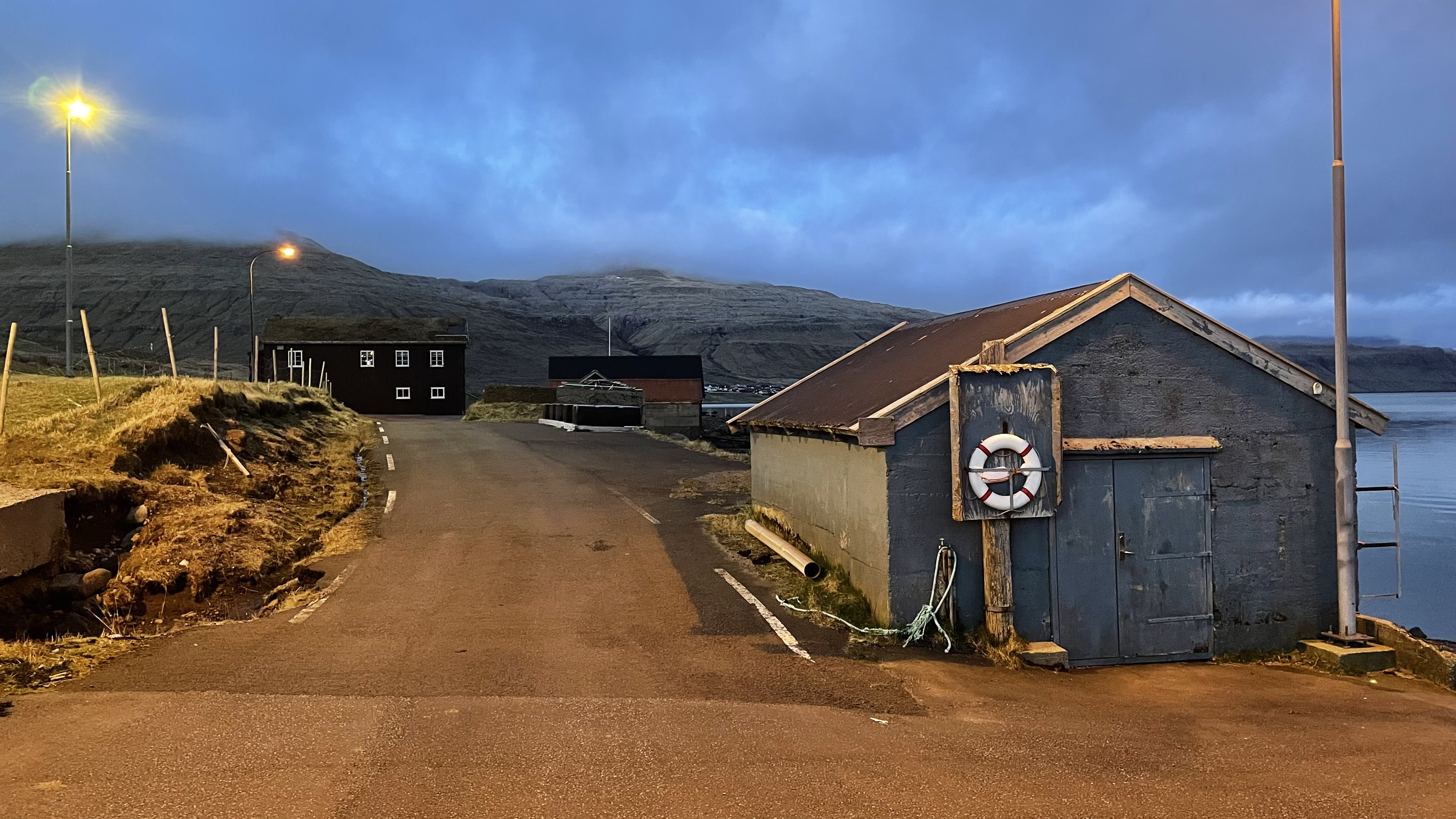
Evening in the harbour
