= Strendur =

- Village
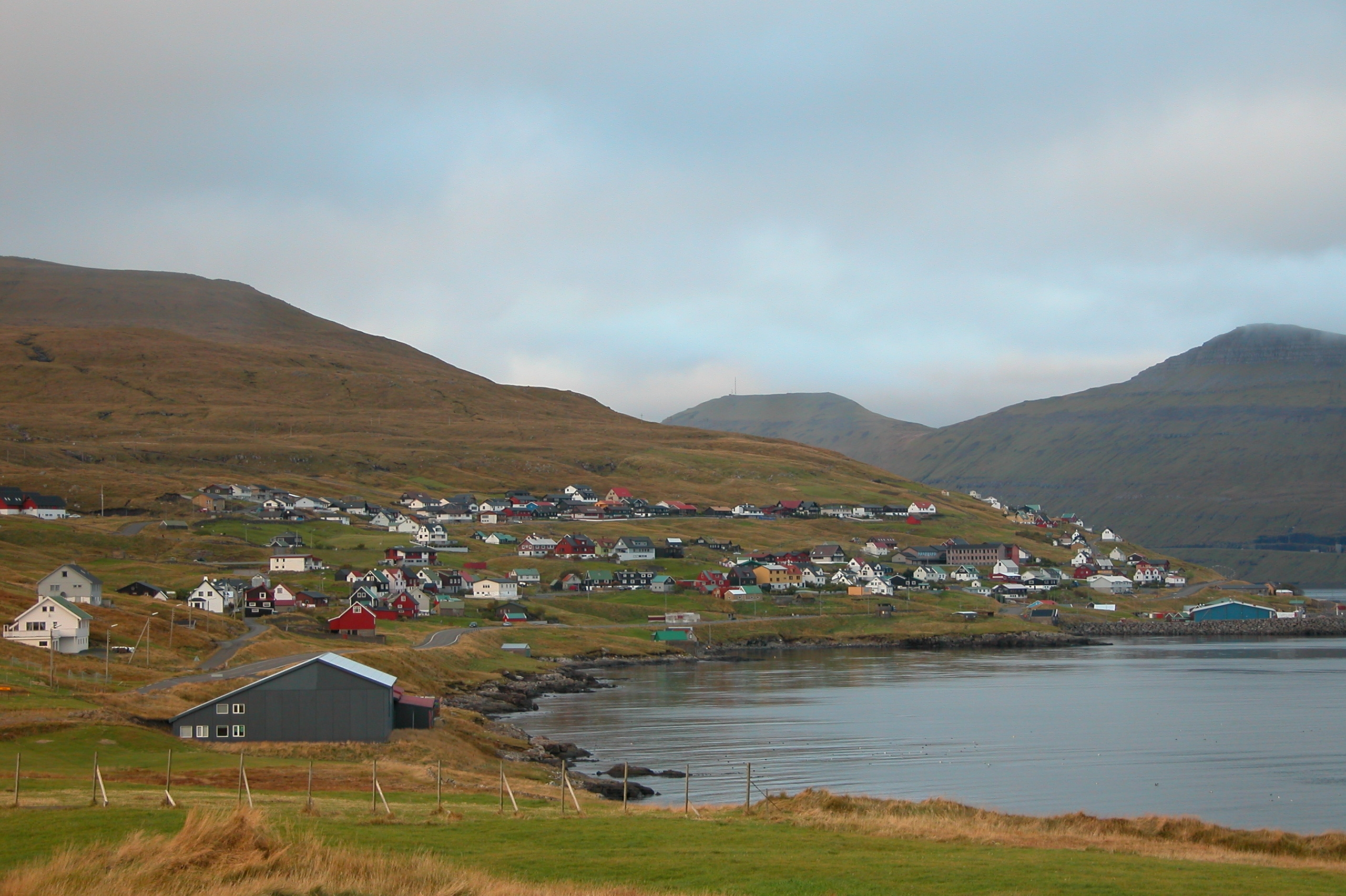
- Strendur at the Skálafjørður, Eysturoy, Faroe Islands

- Location in the Faroe Islands
- Coordinates: 62°6′46″N 6°45′23″W
- State: Kingdom of Denmark
- Constituent country: Faroe Islands
- Island: Eysturoy
- Municipality: Sjóvar Municipality

Population (September 2025)
  - Total: 1,106
- Time zone: GMT
  - Summer (DST): UTC+1 (EST)
- Postal code: FO 490
- Climate: Cfc

Strendur (Faroese pronunciation: [ˈsʰtɹɛntər]) (Danish: Strænder) is a village on the Faroese island of Eysturoy, located along the Skálafjørður fjord. It is the seat and main settlement of the Sjóvar Municipality.

The 2012 population was 785. Its postal code is FO 490. Strendur means beaches or strands in the Faroese language.

The village is connected by road to Selatrað, Skáli and the rest of Eysturoy, and via the Eysturoyartunnilin to Runavík and Tórshavn.

== See also ==
- List of towns in the Faroe Islands
