= Kolbeinagjógv =

- Village
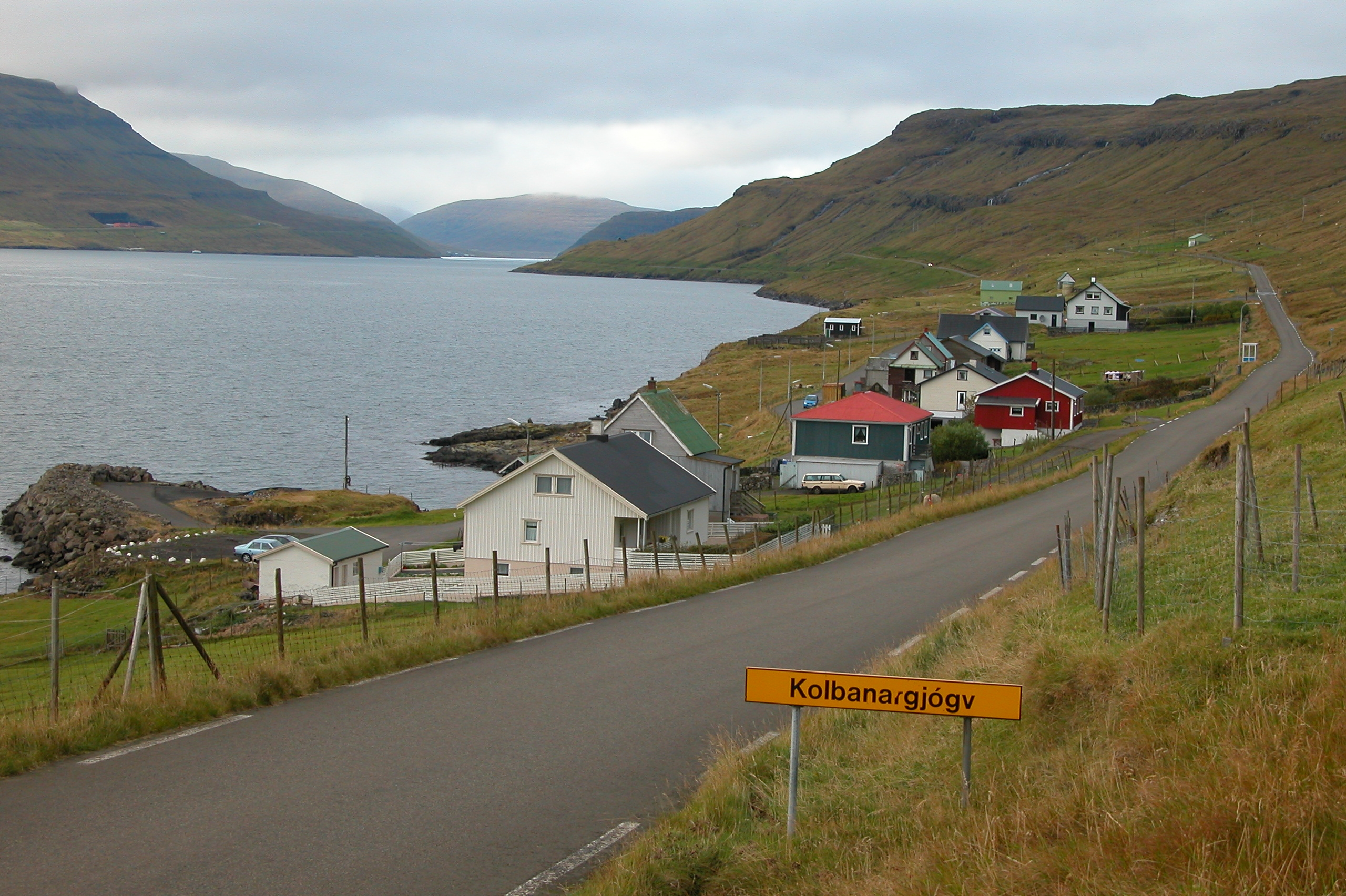
- Kolbeinagjógv

- Location in the Faroe Islands
- Coordinates: 62°6′30″N 6°47′6″W
- State: Kingdom of Denmark
- Constituent country: Faroe Islands
- Island: Eysturoy
- Municipality: Sjóvar kommuna

Population (29 April 2025)
  - Total: 28
- Time zone: GMT
  - Summer (DST): UTC+1 (EST)
- Postal code: FO 495
- Climate: Cfc

Kolbeinagjógv, until 2011 also known as Kolbanargjógv (Danish: Koldbensgjov), is a village on the western coast of the Faroese island of Eysturoy in the Sjóvar municipality, and its postal code is FO 495.

== See also ==
- List of towns in the Faroe Islands
