= Hósvík =

Hósvík Thorsvig (Danish)
- Village
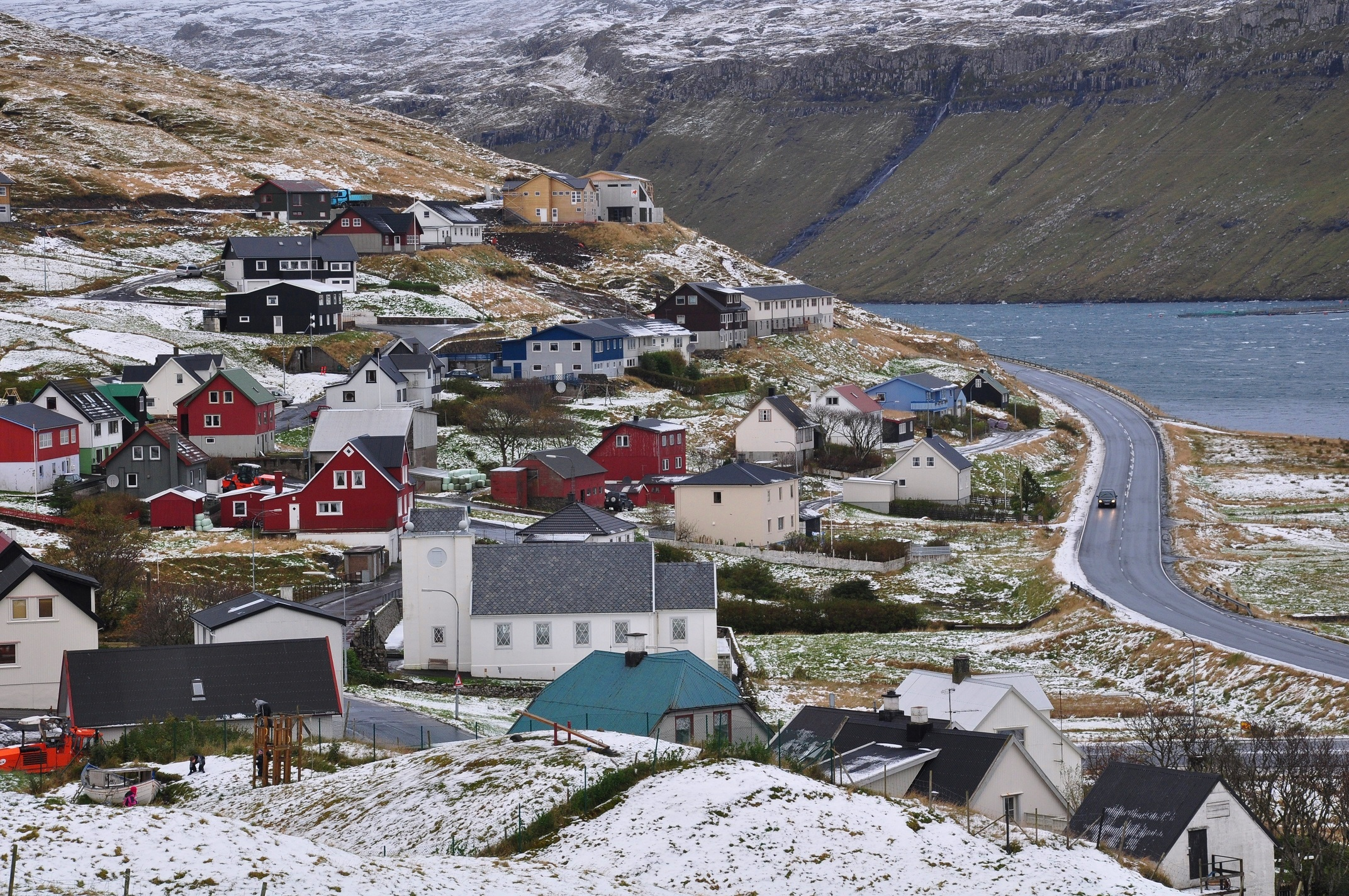
- Hósvík

- Location in the Faroe Islands
- Coordinates: 62°9′17″N 6°56′25″W
- State: Kingdom of Denmark
- Constituent country: Faroe Islands
- Island: Streymoy
- Municipality: Sunda

Population (September 2025)
  - Total: 324
- Time zone: GMT
  - Summer (DST): UTC+1 (EST)
- Postal code: FO 420
- Climate: ET

Hósvík (Danish: Thorsvig) is a village in the Faroe Islands. It has a population of 320 and is located on a bay on Streymoy's east-coast.

The ferry to Selatrað on Eysturoy island used to go from Hósvík, but was superseded by the Streymin Bridge between the islands.

Hósvík was at one point called Thórsvík or Thors Bay, but was renamed to Hósvík. It was called Thors Bay because of the founder, who was believed to be called Tórhallur.

Hósvík is the current home of Krás, a food production facility which delivers to almost all of the shops in the Faroe Islands. Hósvík is also the home of one of the biggest if not the biggest asphalt storage tanks in the Faroe Islands.

Until 2003 Hósvík was run by an independent local council, but following the local election in 2003 it became a part of the larger Sunda Kommuna.

The church in Hósvík dates from 1929.

Hósvík is also the home city of the shipping company Thor Shipping, which is the largest in the Faroe Islands.

Hósvíkar Róðrarfelag is the local rowing club. It has won 4 faroease championships, the latest one in 2020.

== Gallery ==
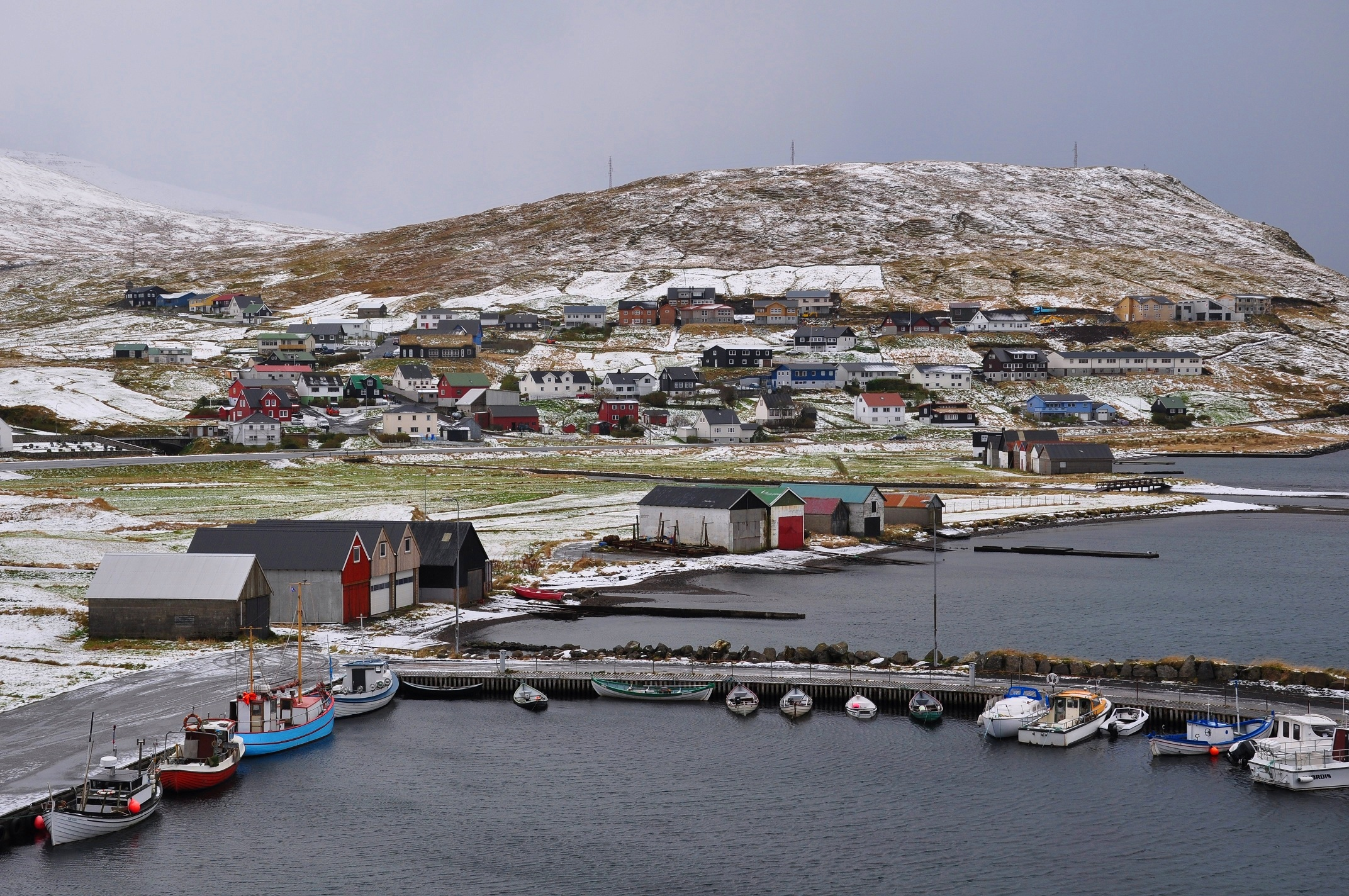
Hósvík with harbour

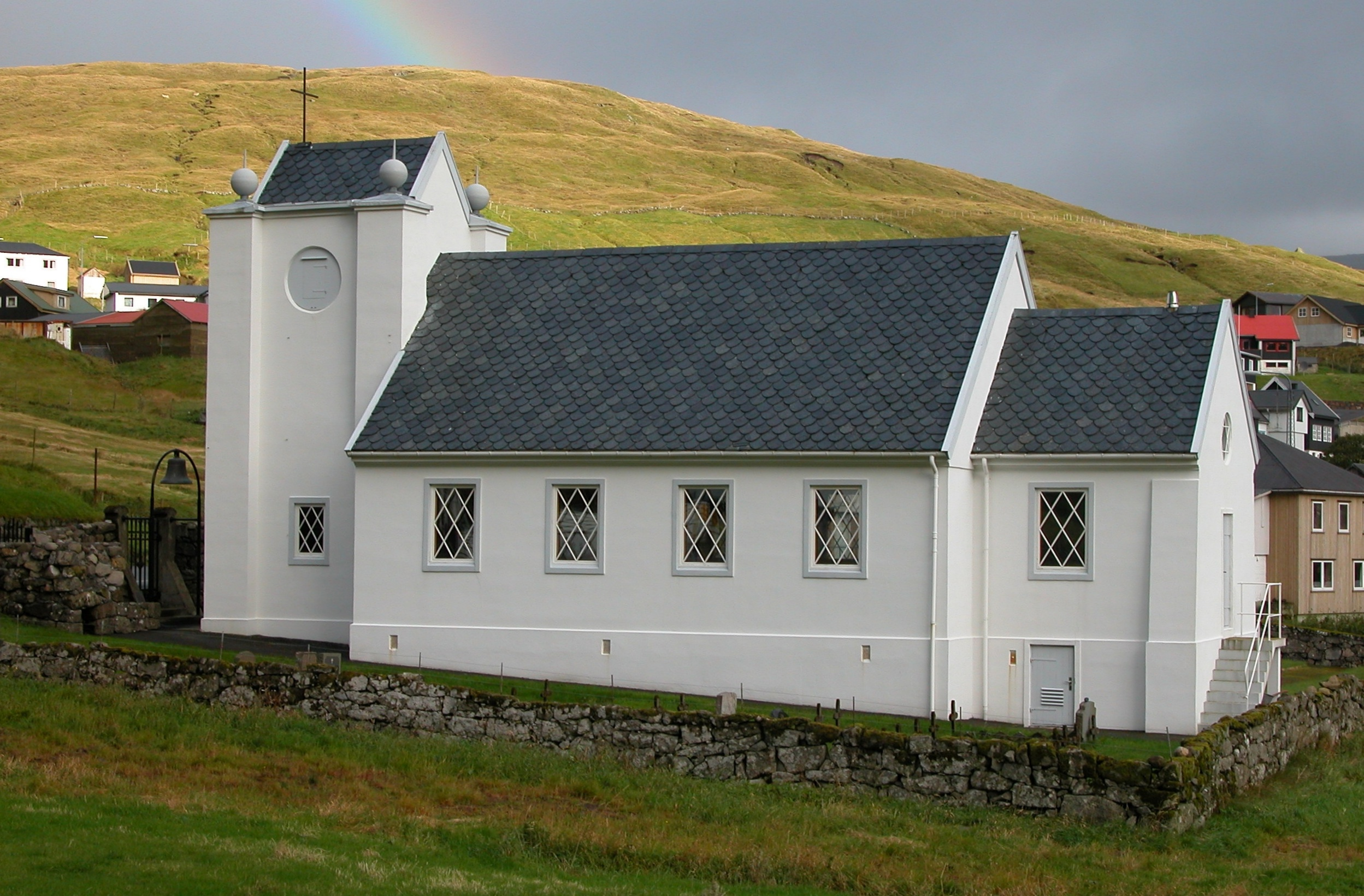
The church of 1929

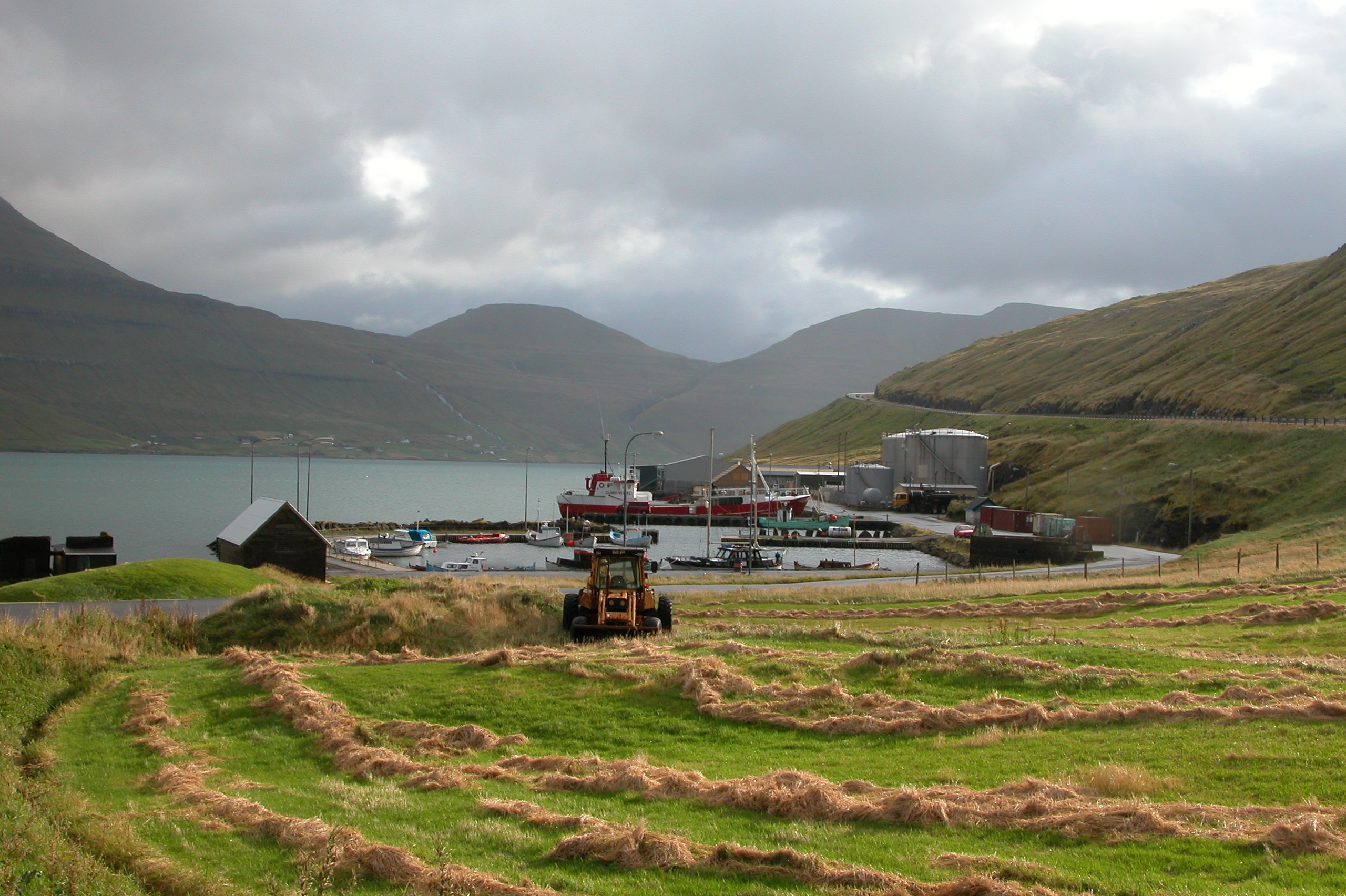
Hósvík, harvesting hay

== See also ==
- List of towns in the Faroe Islands
