= Saltnes, Faroe Islands =

Saltnes
- Location within Denmark Faroe Islands
- Coordinates: 62°06′19″N 06°44′22″W
- State: Kingdom of Denmark
- Constituent country: Faroe Islands
- Island: Eysturoy
- Municipality: Nes Municipality

Population (September 2025)
  - Total: 161
- Time zone: GMT
  - Summer (DST): UTC+1 (EST)
- Postal code: FO 656
- Climate: Cfc

Saltnes is a village on the island of Eysturoy, Faroe Islands, in Nes Municipality.

The population was 152 in August 2022.

== See also ==
- List of towns in the Faroe Islands
