= Morskranes =

- Village
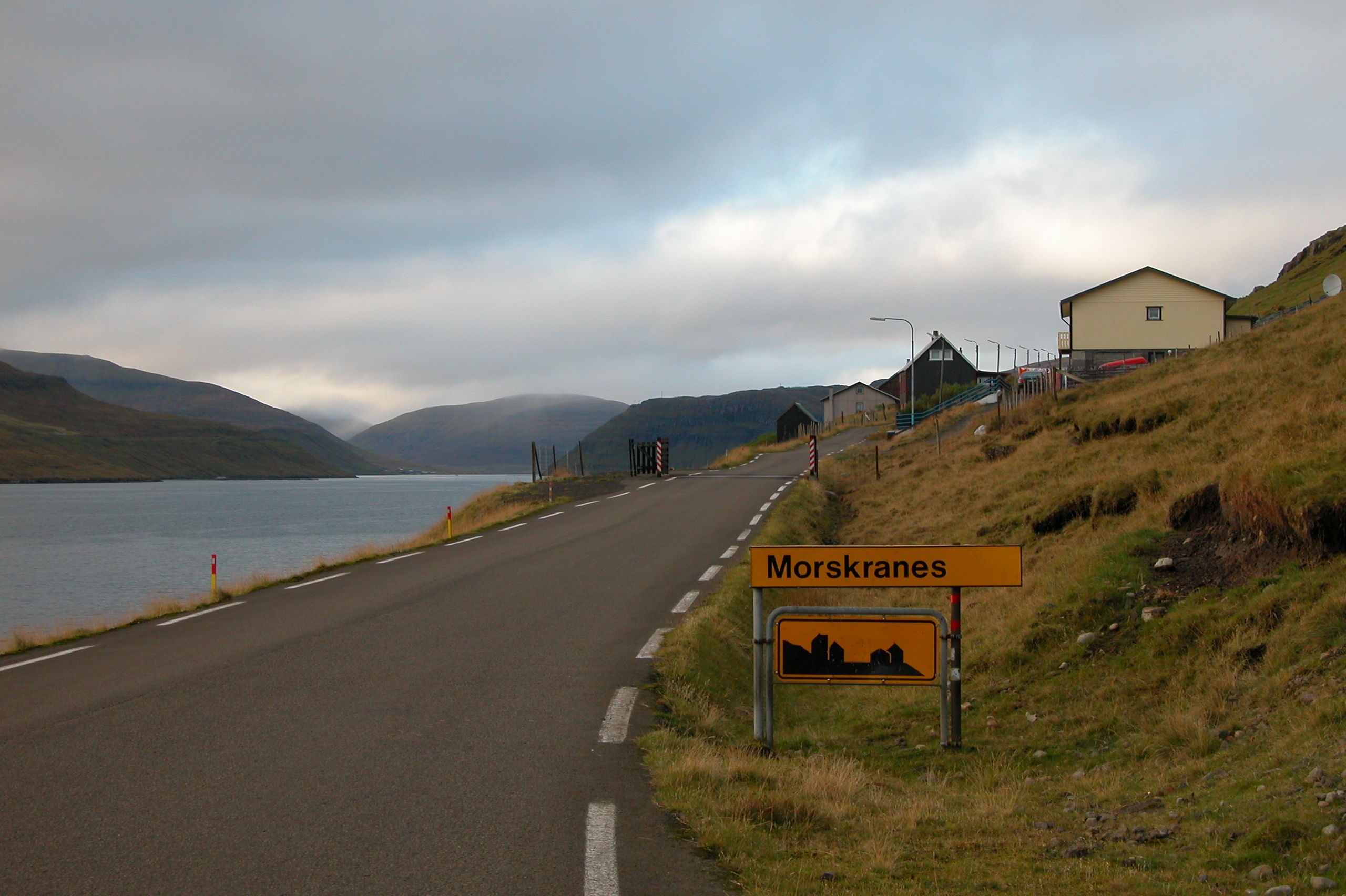
- Morskranes, on Eysturoy, Faroe Islands. View northwards up to the sound of Sundini.

- Location in the Faroe Islands
- Coordinates: 62°7′59″N 6°50′31″W
- State: Kingdom of Denmark
- Constituent country: Faroe Islands
- Island: Eysturoy
- Municipality: Sjóvar Municipality
- Founded: 1877

Population (30 April 2025)
  - Total: 20
- Time zone: GMT
  - Summer (DST): UTC+1 (EST)
- Postal code: FO 496
- Climate: Cfc

Morskranes (Danish: Morskrenæs) is a village on the west coast of the Faroese island of Eysturoy in the Sjóvar Municipality and its postal code is FO 496.

Morskranes can translate roughly as "Moors of the Corner".

== See also ==
- List of towns in the Faroe Islands
