= Sjóvar Municipality =

Coordinates: 62°06′24″N 6°45′43″W

Sjóvar Municipality Sjóvar kommuna (Faroese)
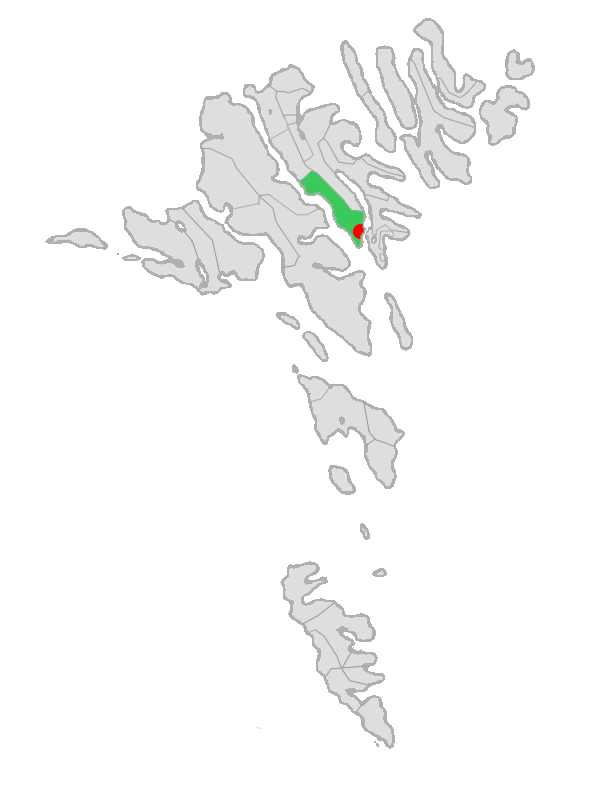
- Location of Sjóvar kommuna in the Faroe Islands
- State: Kingdom of Denmark
- Constituent country: Faroe Islands
- Island: Eysturoy

Area
  - Total: 33 km^{2} (13 sq mi)

Population (August 2024)
  - Total: 1,206
  - Density: 37/km^{2} (95/sq mi)

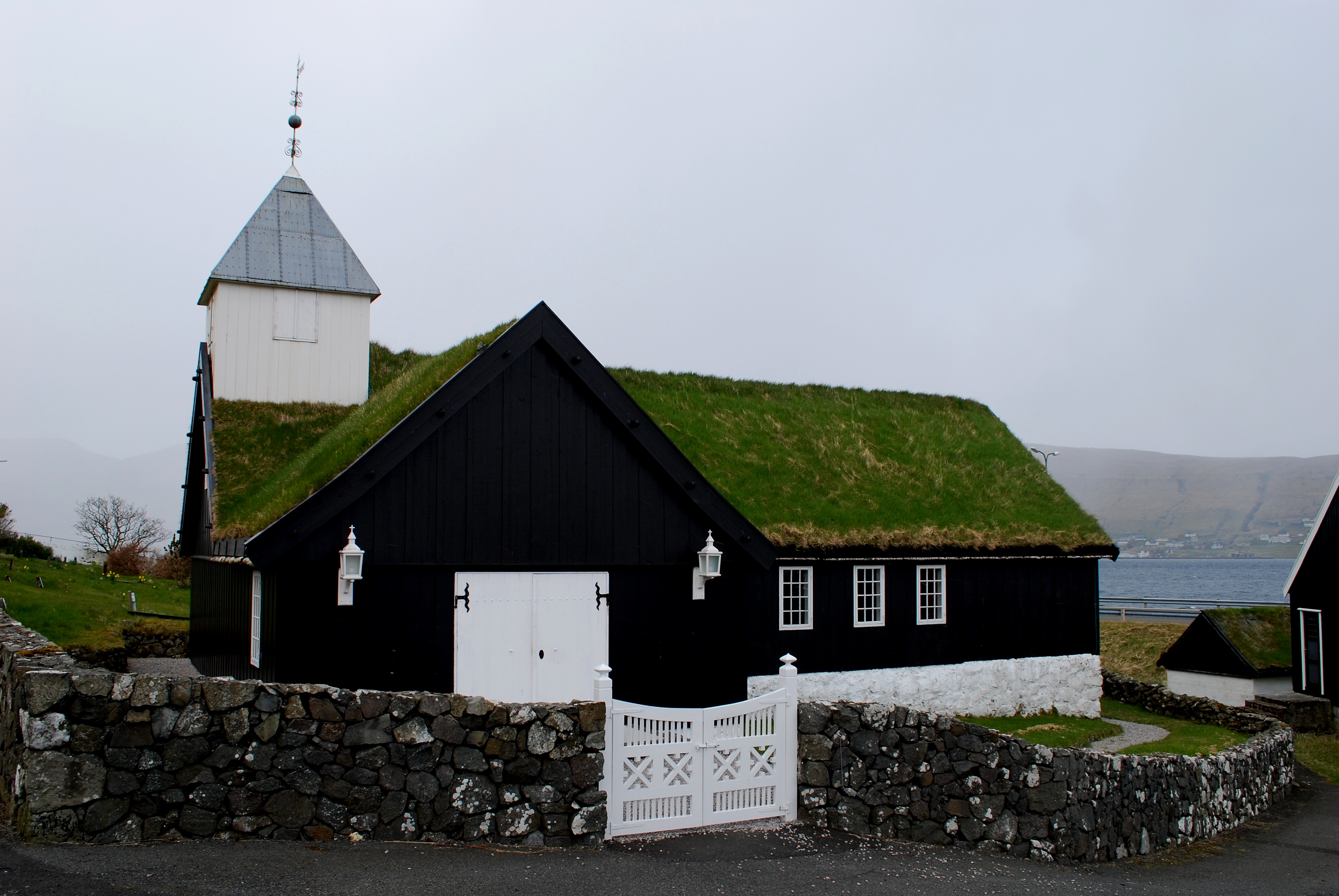
Sjóvar Church

Sjóvar Municipality (Faroese: Sjóvar kommuna) is a municipality of the Faroe Islands. The name of the municipality has its origins from the farm Sjógv á Strondum which gave name to Sjóvar parish. The name comes from the Faroese word for seawater (sjógvur). Sjóvar covers a part of the island of Eysturoy. It consists of the villages of Strendur, Innan Glyvur, Selatrað, Morskranes and Kolbanargjógv.
