= Selatrað =

- Village
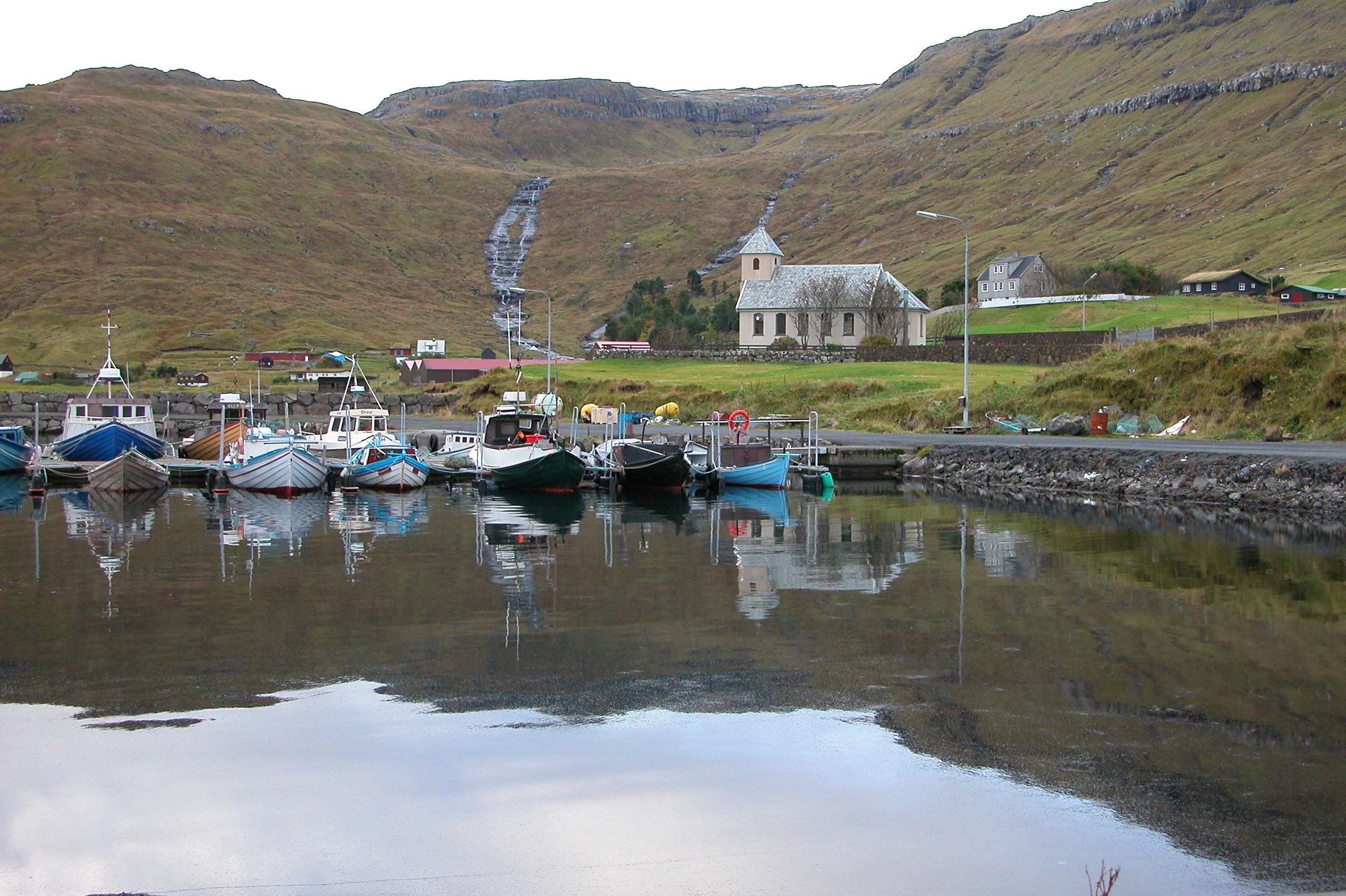
- Harbour of Selatrað, Eysturoy

- Location in the Faroe Islands
- Coordinates: 62°9′31″N 6°52′41″W
- State: Kingdom of Denmark
- Constituent country: Faroe Islands
- Island: Eysturoy
- Municipality: Sjóvar Municipality

Population (2010)
  - Total: 38
- Time zone: GMT
  - Summer (DST): UTC+1 (EST)
- Postal code: FO 497
- Climate: Cfc

Selatrað (Danish: Selletræ) is a village on the west coast of the Faroese island of Eysturoy in Sjóvar Municipality. The name Selatrað refers to a breeding place for seals.

The 2010 population was 38. Its postal code is FO 497. The village's church, the first in the archipelago made from concrete, was built in 1926. The third biggest plantation in the Faroe Islands is in Selatrað. It was severely damaged in a hurricane in 1988, destroying 2/3 of it. However the biggest trees (20m in height) survived.

Selatrað was once the parliamentary meeting place for the whole of Eysturoy.

== See also ==
- List of towns in the Faroe Islands
