= Skopunarfjørður =

Strait separating Sandoy and Streymoy in the Faroe Islands

Coordinates: 61.92°N 6.82°W

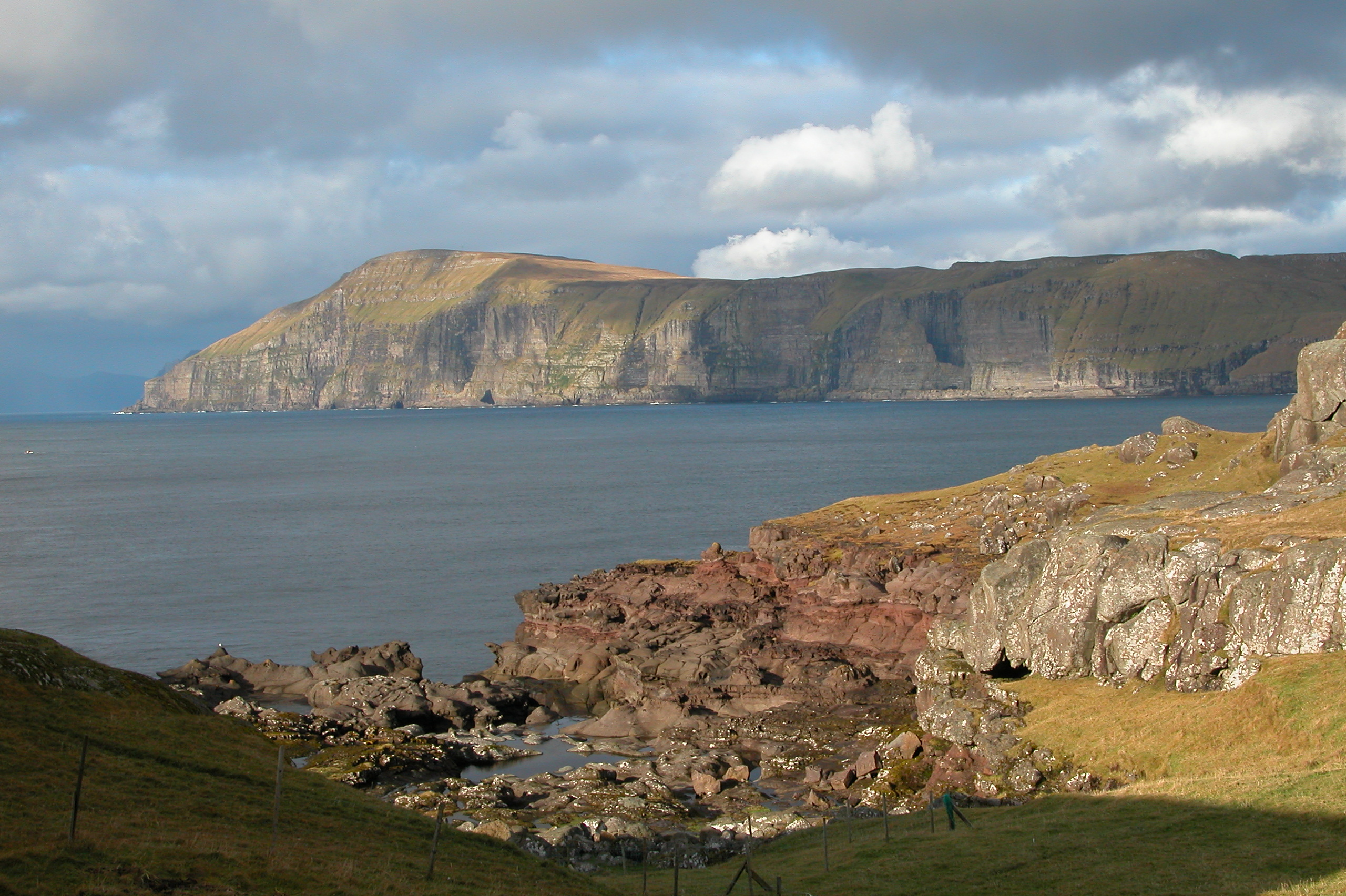
Skopunarfjørður.

Skopunarfjørður is a strait separating Sandoy and Streymoy in the Faroe Islands. The strait also passes the isle of Hestur.

== Geography ==
The strait runs between Trøllhøvdi (an islet off northern Sandoy) and the south cape of Hestur in the west and Kirkjubønes on Streymoy in the east, over a length of circa 12 kilometres (7.5 mi). It is c. 5.5 kilometres (3.4 mi) wide at its narrowest point between Sandoy and Streymoy, and 2.7 kilometres (1.7 mi) between Skopun and Hestur. It is circa 80 metres (260 ft) deep in the middle reaches of the strait. The fjord is bordered by the Tórshavn, Skopun, Sandur and Skálavík municipalities. Incidentally, the Trøllhøvdi islet belongs to Kirkjubøur (Tórshavn Municipality), even though it is separated by a few meters of water from Sandoy. It is used for grazing sheep.

Skopunarfjørður is named after the village of Skopun. Fjørður in Faroese can refer to either a fjord in the traditional sense or, in this case, a broad strait between islands. It is renowned for its strong tidal current.

The fjord is traditionally used as the boundary between the southern region and the northern Faroe Islands. The region south of the Skopunarfjørður is referred to as sunnanfjørðs while north of it is norðanfjørðs. The strait constitutes a dialectical boundary and isogloss in the Faroese language.

== Transport ==
In 2023, the Sandoyartunnilin opened between Gamlarætt and central Sandoy, replacing the ferries with an all-weather alternative. Strandfaraskip Landsins operates a bus service crossing under the strait the car, while previously it had operated ferry Teistin (route 60) and the cargo ferry Hasfjord (route 85) between Skopun on Sandoy and Gamlarætt on Streymoy, taking 30 minutes for the crossing. In winter the ferries were often cancelled due to adverse weather or swell. There continues to be a ferry service to Hestur.

== See also ==
- Sandoyartunnilin
- Tangafjørður
- Fjords in the Faroe Islands
