= Sandoyartunnilin =

Undersea road tunnel in the Faroe Islands

Coordinates: 61.92°N 6.82°W

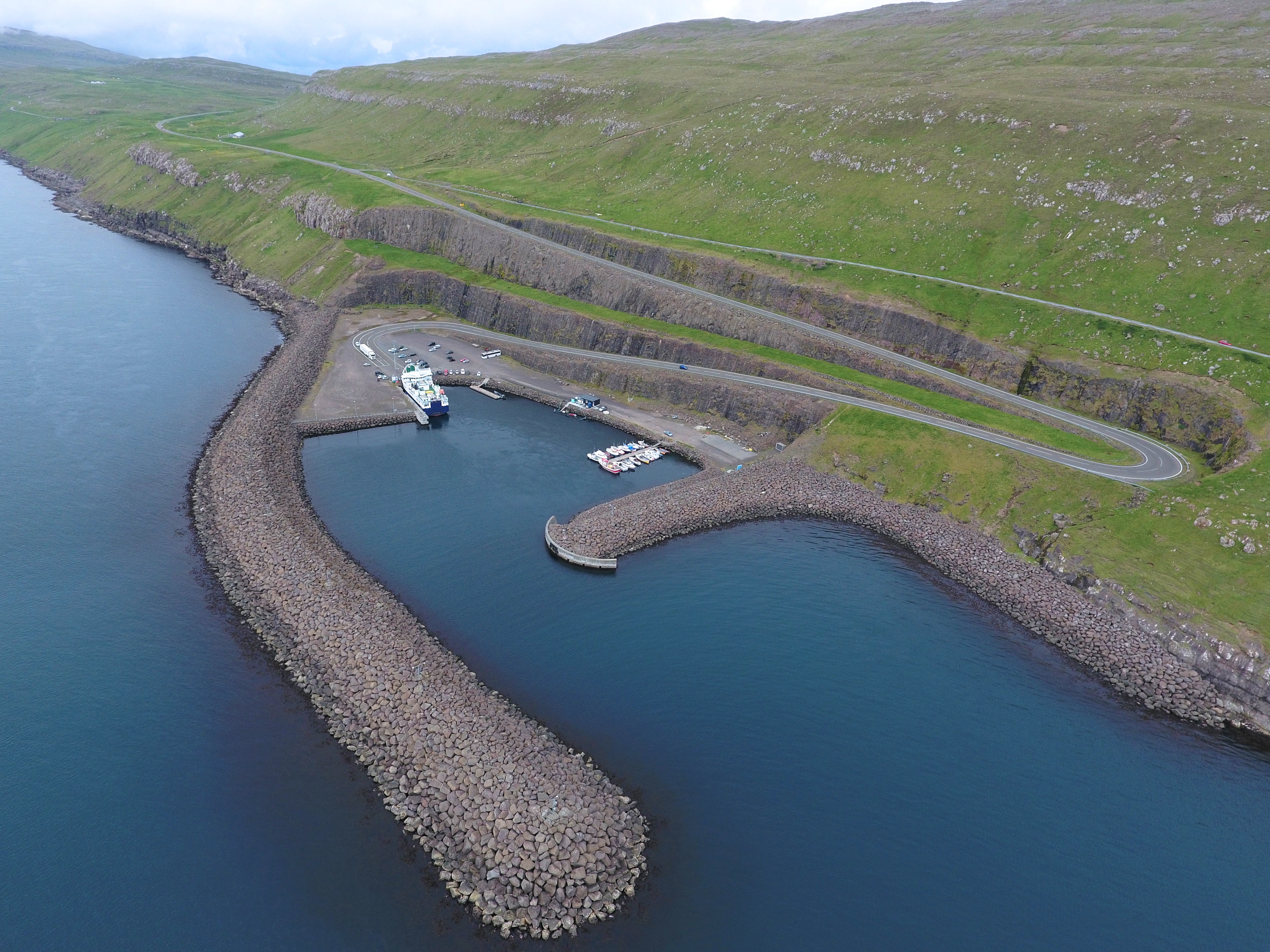
- Aerial photo of the Gamlarætt ferry port, where the Streymoy entrance of the Sandoyartunnilin is also located. The photo was taken before construction started.
- Interactive map of Sandoyartunnilin

Overview
- Location: Sandoy and Streymoy, Faroe Islands
- Status: Open

Operation
- Work began: 2019
- Opened: 21 December 2023
- Owner: Faroese government
- Operator: P/F Eystur- og Sandoyartunlar
- Traffic: Automotive
- Toll: Yes
- Vehicles per day: 1057 (2025)

Technical
- Length: 10,785 m (35,384 ft)
- No. of lanes: 2
- Operating speed: 80 km/h (50 mph)
- Max elevation: 50.7 m (166 ft)
- Tunnel clearance: 4.6 m (15 ft)
- Width: 10.5 m (34 ft)
- Depth below water: 155.1 m (509 ft)
- Grade: 5.0% (max.)

Sandoyartunnilin (transl. Sandoy Tunnel) is an undersea road tunnel in the Faroe Islands. It connects the main island of Streymoy with Sandoy to the south. The length of the tunnel is 10.8 kilometres (6.7 mi), and the estimated cost is 860 million DKK. The tunnel opened for traffic on 21 December 2023, after which the ferry Teistin ceased its route between Gamlarætt on Streymoy and Skopun on Sandoy. The tunnel crosses the Skopunarfjørður and runs from Gamlarætt to Traðardalur in central Sandoy, near the Inni í Dal stadium.

The two sides of the tunnel were connected during a ceremony on 3 February 2022. Construction began on 27 June 2019, and the halfway mark was hit in September 2020.

In political, legal and financial terms, the project is linked to the Eysturoyartunnilin, which was opened for traffic on 19 December 2020. The Eysturoyartunnilin, at more than tenfold the traffic numbers projected for the Sandoyartunnilin, will partially finance the latter via cross subsidisation once the former's investment has been returned. Toll levels of Sandoyartunnilin are pegged to those of the Eysturoyartunnilin.

A new residential and industrial area is being built with tunnel debris at Velbastaður. Other debris has been used in Runavík and Strendur for new bypass roads.

Bus route 650 uses the tunnel daily from Sandur to Tórshavn. On Sandoy, it connects with services to Skálavík, Húsavík, Dalur and Skopun, and in Tórshavn with various Bussleiðin and national routes. It also connects with the ferry service to Hestur in Gamlarætt and Skúvoy in Sandur.

The Faroese Útoyggjafelagið (transl. Outpost Island Society) lobbied for a branch to the island of Hestur, but this was deprioritised due to costs. Gamlarætt will remain a ferry port for Hestur after the Sandoy route terminates.

As of November 2025, the average daily ridership over twelve months was 1,057 vehicles per day. Similar to the other three sub-sea tunnels, traffic continues to rise every year. Usage is vastly outnumbering original projections: In the planning phase, it was projected that 300–400 vehicles per day would use the tunnel to Sandoy. In comparison, the average daily ridership of the ferry route (before the tunnel opened) was 195 vehicles (including drivers) and 613 passengers (excluding drivers) in 2021. However, already in the first two full months with tolls, 783 and 919 vehicles used the tunnel, for February and March 2024, respectively.

The ridership of the Sandoyartunnilin would be further increased if it could act as a stepping stone for the Suðuroyartunnilin, or new ferry route, to Suðuroy.

== See also ==
- List of tunnels of the Faroe Islands
