= Gamlarætt =

Ferry port in the Faroe Islands

Coordinates: 61°57′45″N 6°49′07″W

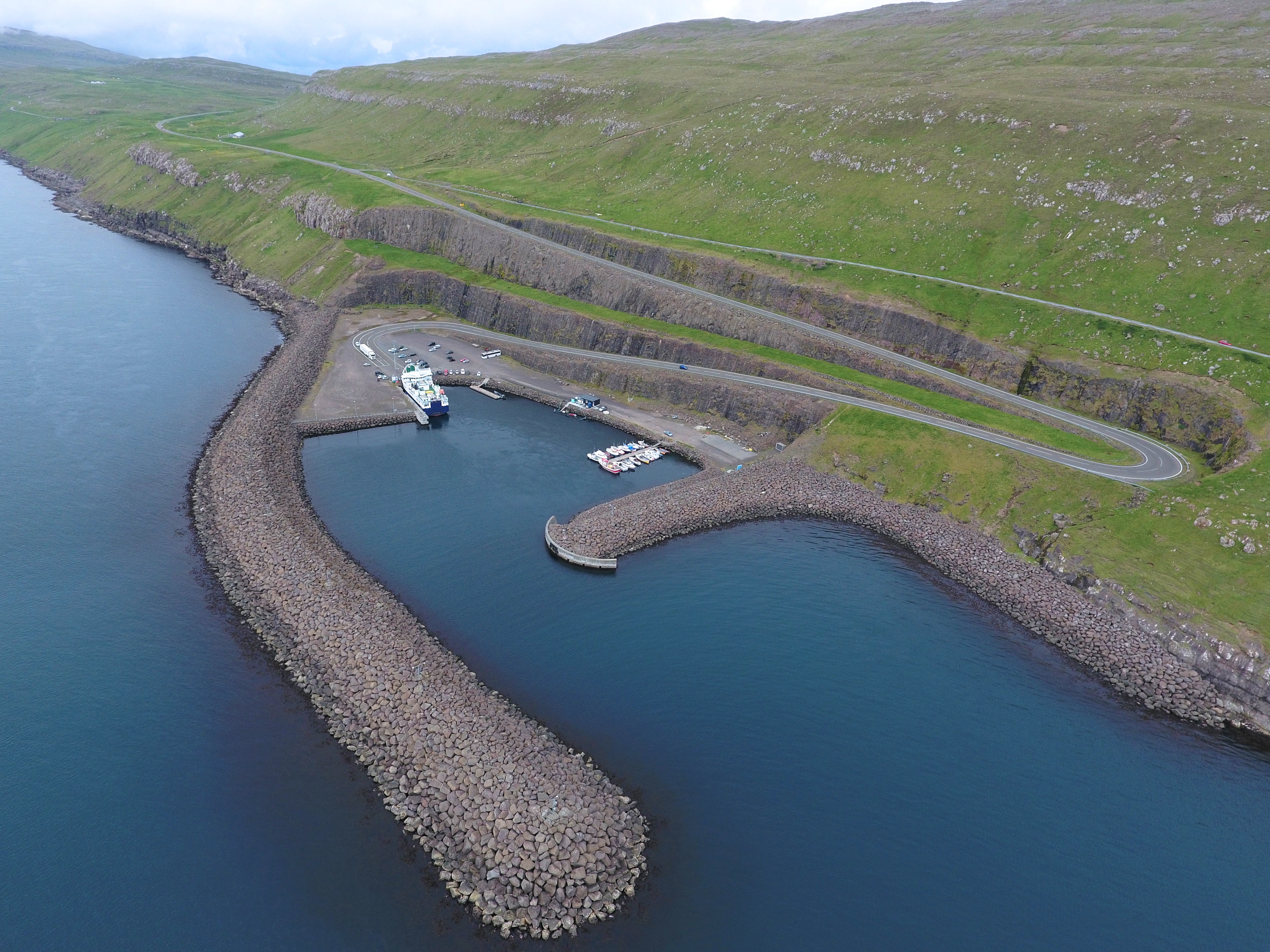
Aerial photo of Gamlarætt

Gamlarætt is a ferry port in the Faroe Islands. It is situated on the southwestern side of the island of Streymoy, the largest island in the Faroes, between the villages of Velbastaður and Kirkjubøur. It accommodates ferry services to the islands of Sandoy and Hestur. The port is also used for local salmon farms.

== History ==
Until 1993 all ferry traffic to Sandoy operated from Tórshavn, on a northern route across Skopunarfjørður to Skopun and Hestur, and a southern route via Skúvoyarfjørður to Skálavík, Skúvoy and Sandur. This resulted in crossing times of 1–2 hours for non-stop trips to 2–3 hours with other calls en route from Tórshavn. A ferry port at Streymoy's southern tip would reduce the crossing time to 30 minutes to both Sandoy and 20 minutes to Hestur. Such a jetty was earlier proposed to be built in Kirkjubøur in 1963 and 1970, selected for its proximity to Sandoy and the relatively calm waters.

The latest proposal for a new ferry port surfaced in 1983, again selecting Kirkjubøur. However, locals argued the ferry port would harm the village's important historic character. Eventually the Løgting decided in 1986 to construct the ferry port north of Kirkjubøur at a site only locally known, named Gamlarætt or in translation 'the old sheepfold'. This site has a steep coast with heavy breakers, necessitating the extensive use of breakwaters. Construction started in 1987 but was put on hold in 1990 in the face of the Faroese economic crisis. The Faroese government had to deprioritise numerous projects, including the Vágatunnilin (which opened eventually in 2002), but for financial reasons it continued the works at Gamlarætt. It opened in May 1993 when the old ferry Tróndur started using the new jetty and route, reducing crossing times from Streymoy to Skopun from 1.15 hour (2.5 hours via Hestur) down to 30 minutes. The direct ferry services to other villages on Sandoy ceased. In 2001 the purpose-built ferry Teistin took over the route and Tróndur was decommissioned.

Gamlarætt consists of 540 metres of breakwater, which was built with broken rocks created by the blasting of the hairpin turns carved into the cliffside, seen in the photo above. The total costs are estimated at 130 million krones. When including the construction of ports in Skopun and Hestur and the new highway to Tórshavn, the entire project has an estimated cost of 300 million krones.

== Ferry routes ==
Since the opening of Sandoyartunnilin, Strandfaraskip Landsins operates one ferry route from Gamlarætt:

- Route 61 to Hestur (ferry Teistin)

There is no ferry connection to the uninhabited island of Koltur.

== Accessibility ==
From Gamlarætt there is a modern highway to Tórshavn, which takes circa 15 minutes by car. Strandfaraskip Landsins operates route 101 from Tórshavn to meet departures to Sandoy. Buses do not call in Velbastaður (village) or Kirkjubøur, but can stop at junctions on request.

Tórshavn's local Bussleiðin routes 6 and 8 doesn't stop at Gamlarætt port, though passengers can embark and disembark at the junction towards Kirkjubøur, some 1.3 kilometres (0.81 mi) uphill.

The Sandoyartunnilin opened in 2023 and it goes from Gamlarætt towards Sandoy. The tunnel mouth is located right next to the ferry jetty. It replaced the ferry service to Sandoy, but Gamlarætt is still in use for the service to Hestur. In future, this might provide a stepping stone for the Suðuroyartunnilin. After the opening, Gamlarætt remains the port-of-access to Hestur, though additional uses for the terrain may be found for example tourism and recreational purposes.

== See also ==
- Transport in the Faroe Islands
- Fjords in the Faroe Islands
- List of tunnels of the Faroe Islands
