= Skopun =

Town on the Faroe Islands, Denmark

Skopun Skopen (Danish)
- Municipality and village
- Skopun Municipality; Skopunar kommuna (Faroese)
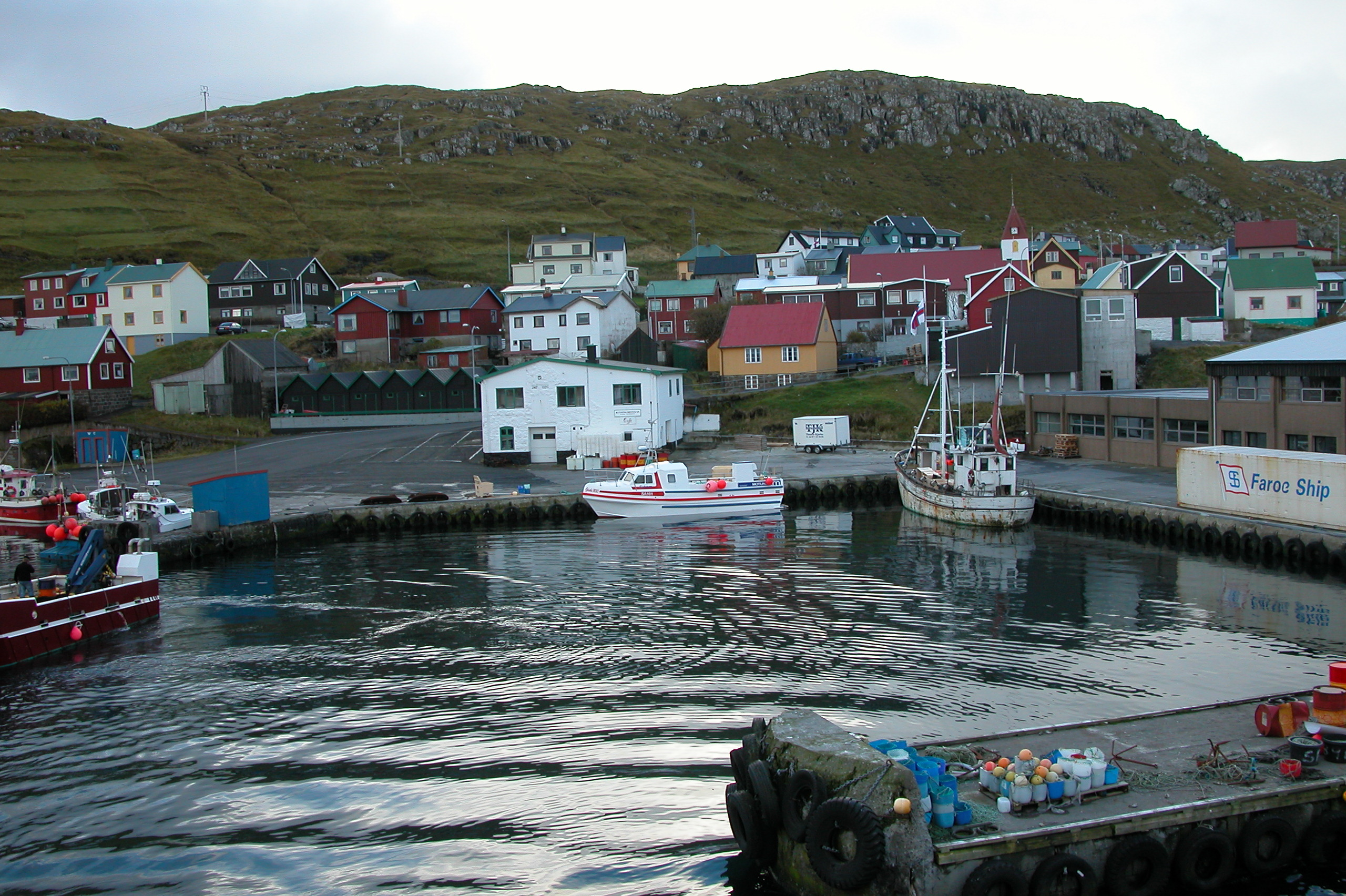

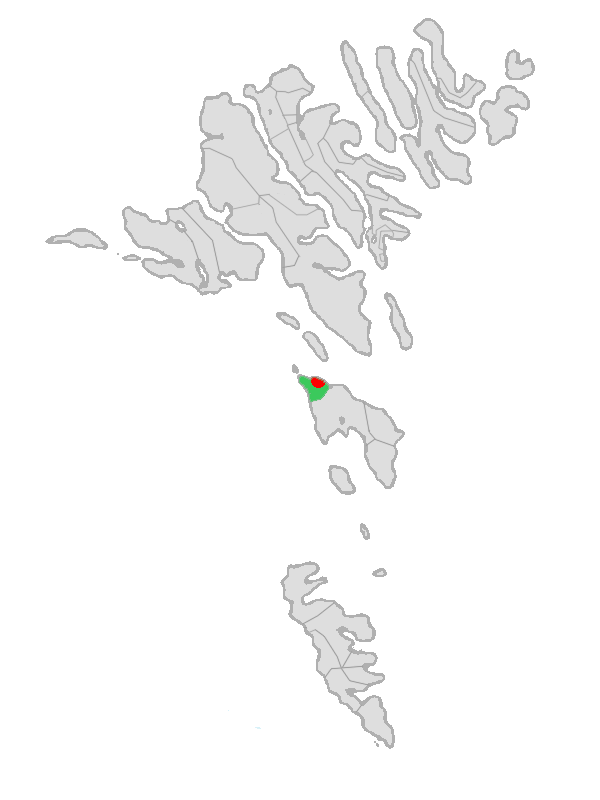
- Location of Skopun Municipality in the Faroe Islands

- Location of Skopun village in the Faroe Islands
- Coordinates: 61°54′45″N 6°52′19″W
- State: Kingdom of Denmark
- Constituent country: Faroe Islands
- Island: Sandoy
- Municipality: Skopun Municipality
- Founded: 1833

Population (September 2025)
  - Total: 481
- Time zone: GMT
  - Summer (DST): UTC+1 (WEST)
- Postal code: FO 240
- Climate: Cfc
- Website: Skopun

Skopun (pronounced [skopʊn]; Danish: Skopen) is a town in the Faroe Islands situated on the northern coast of Sandoy.

Skopun is the second-largest town on the island. Skopun Municipality consists only of the town of Skopun.

== History ==
Although the area has been inhabited since the Middle Ages, Skopun was not founded until 1833. The people of Skopun did not possess any land. They subsisted on fishing, so the houses were built close to the water.

In 1897, Skopun's church was constructed out of timber taken from the old church of Vestmanna. The Faroe Islands' first road was built on Sandoy in 1917, as part of a government-financed plan to improve the island's non-existent harbour facilities. It connects Skopun with Sandur, the island's main town. Skopun's harbour was built in 1926 and later extended. In 1982, the harbour was furnished with a gate which protects the dock from the sea. A 1988 hurricane destroyed the town's small wood.

Until December 2023, Skopun was the ferry port for the route to Gamlarætt on Streymoy, occasionally via Hestur. This service ceased to operate after the Sandoyartunnilin opened for general traffic.

== Name ==
The first part of the place name comes from skopa, a bowl shaped vessel for bailing water out of a boat (better known as an eyskar), and the un by a shortening of havn (haven or port). The Danish Skopen appeared on three cancellers between 1908 and 1962 and Skopun has been in use since. The word skopa as defined seems to be uniquely Faroese, although a similar-sounding skota was the word for a bailing vessel in northeast Iceland (also called austurskota).

== People from Skopun ==
- Peter Mohr Dam, prime minister
- Gerhard Lognberg, politician
- Niels Winther Poulsen, educator and politician
- Sakaris Stórá, film director

== See also ==
- List of towns in the Faroe Islands
- Skopunarfjørður

== Gallery ==
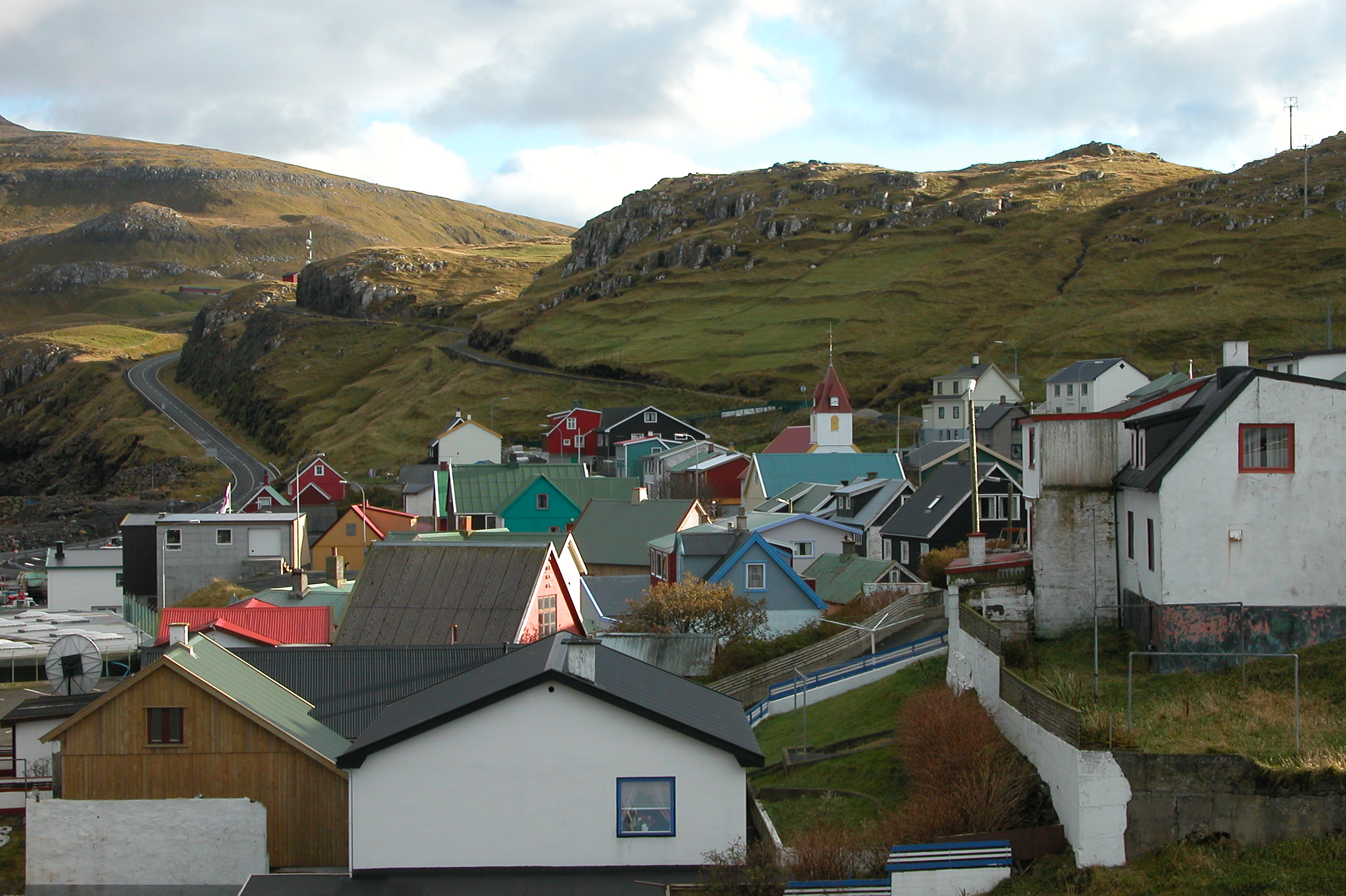
The village of Skopun

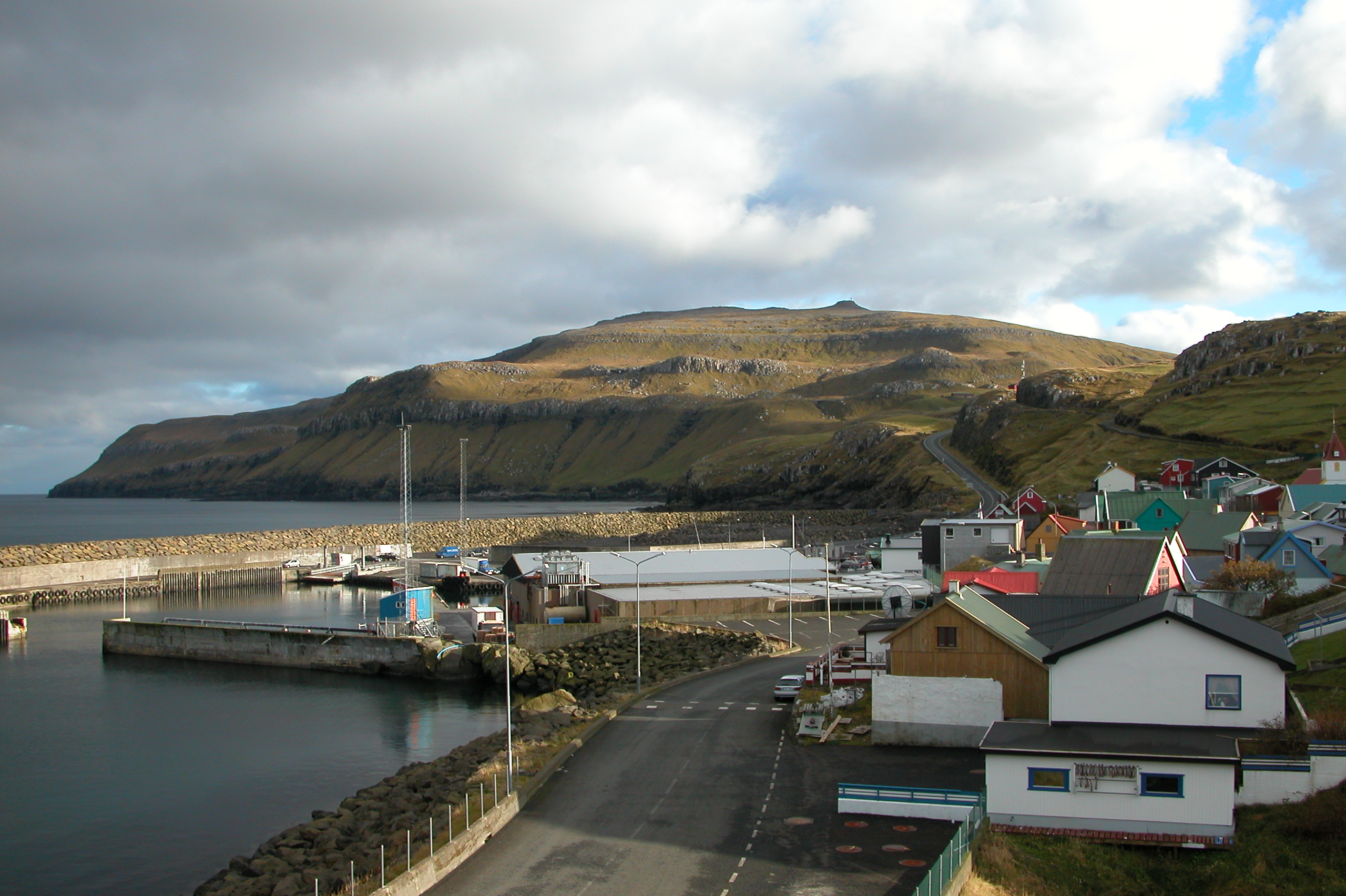
View over Skopun

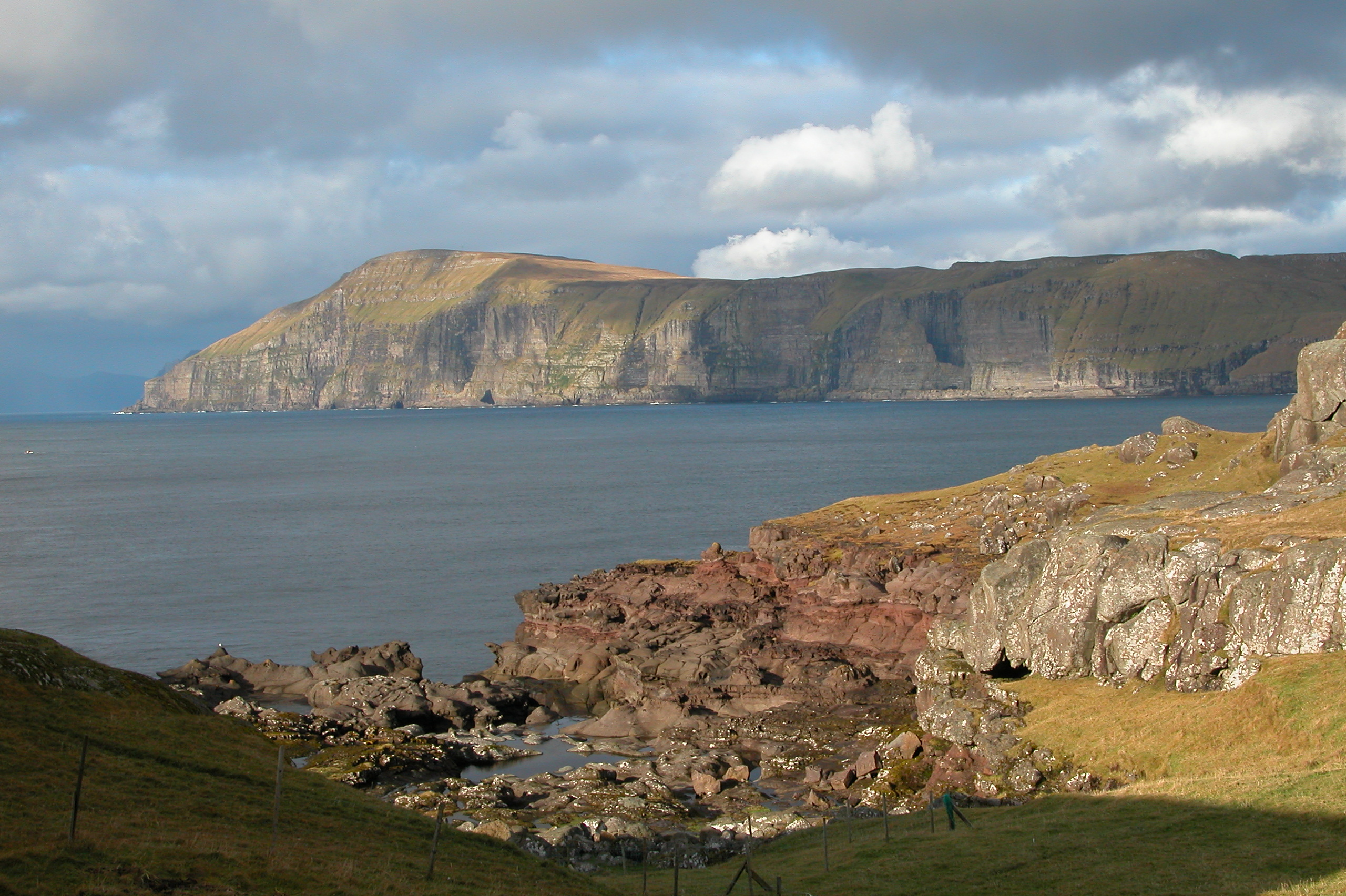
View from Skopun northwards over the Skopunarfjørður to Hestur

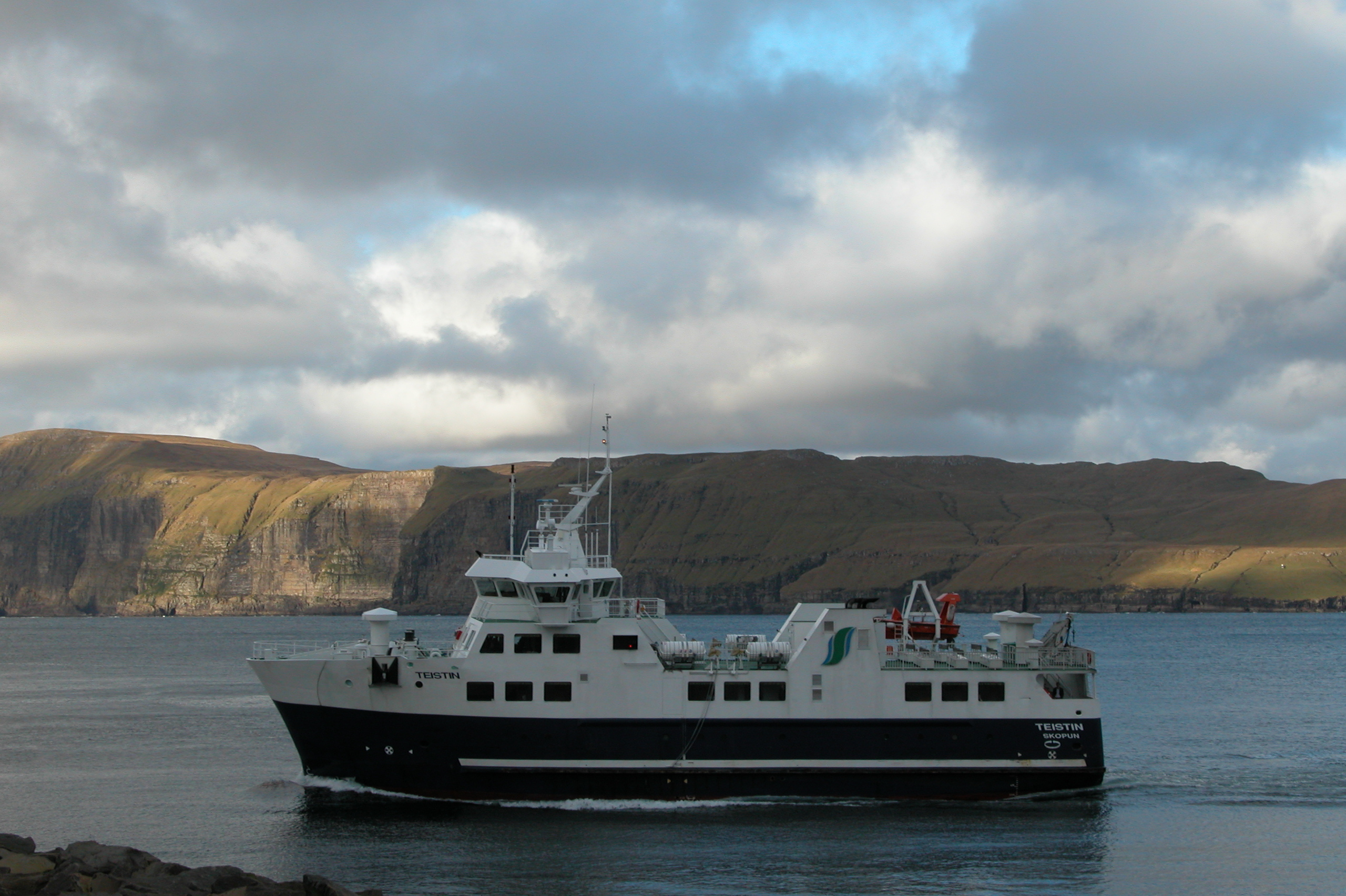
The ferry "Teistin", connecting Skopun on Sandoy with Gamlarætt on Streymoy.
