= Suðuroyartunnilin =

Proposed submerged fixed-link in the Faroe Islands

- Interactive map of Suðuroyartunnilin

Overview
- Location: Suðuroy, Sandoy and Skúvoy, Faroe Islands
- Status: Approved

Operation
- Opens: earliest 2036
- Owner: Faroese government
- Operator: p/f Suðuroyartunnilin, on behalf of the Faroese government
- Traffic: Automotive
- Toll: Yes
- Vehicles per day: between 1060 and 1370 in 2030, up to 2000 in 2050

Technical
- Length: ca. 24.297 km (15.097 mi)
- No. of lanes: 2
- Operating speed: 80 km/h (50 mph)
- Width: 9.5 m (31 ft)
- Grade: 5‰ (main tube)

Suðuroyartunnilin (the Suðuroy Tunnel) is an approved undersea tunnel project in the Faroe Islands, linking the island of Suðuroy to Sandoy and Skúvoy. The tunnel will run between Djúpudalur near Skarvanes on Sandoy and Sandvík on Suðuroy, with a branch to Skúvoy. Two drilling parties, at either end, will dig towards each other, after which the branch to Skúvoy will be drilled from the main tube upward. Until its opening (earliest in 2036), all vehicles and cargo, and virtually all passenger traffic must use the ferry service.

== Current situation ==
As of 2026, a ferry service operates between Krambatangi on central Suðuroy and the capital Tórshavn. The ferry is operated by the national transport company Strandfaraskip Landsins and uses the vessel Smyril (passengers and cargo) taking two hours and five minutes each way. In 2024, on average 1,054 passengers (including vehicle drivers) and 307 vehicles embarked on the ferry per day. The frequency is either twice or three times per day, though the service is frequently cancelled in winter due to adverse weather and heavy seas, since the Suðuroyarfjørður strait is exposed to swell and strong tidal currents (with overfalls in places), and funnels northwesterlies. In addition, annual maintenance requires a suitable charter vessel, which is not always available for such exposed route.

Currently another ferry links Skúvoy and Sandoy multiple trips per day, most of which need to be reserved in advance. If the Suðuroyartunnilin would route via Skúvoy, it would add Skúvoy to the road network and replace this passenger ferry service as well. The Suðuroyartunnilin would form a structural, direct link between Sandoy and Suðuroy - the two southern sýslur (districts) - for the first time in decades. Currently they are only marginally linked via a twice-weekly helicopter service, running the route Tórshavn-Skúvoy-Stóra Dímun-Froðba, which does not call at Sandoy itself.

The Sandoyartunnilin opened in December 2023 and connects Sandoy to Streymoy. This tunnel would act as a stepping stone for Suðuroy. Until a tunnel to Suðuroy be finished, it has been suggested by Strandfaraskip Landsins in 2023 that the ferry from Suðuroy northwards could also start in Hvalba and terminate in Sandur. This route would nearly halve the crossing time down to 1 hour and 15 minutes, thus allowing for increased frequency and daily capacity. However, the ports in Hvalba and Sandur would need to be extended in order to accommodate MS Smyril or comparable vessels.

Landsverk have constructed a new Hvalbiartunnil between Trongisvágur and Hvalba. This tunnel replaced the old tunnel from 1963. The old Hvalbiartunnilin was a bottleneck that needed to be solved for before Suðuroyartunnilin could become a reality.

== History ==
=== Earlier sub-sea tunnels ===
The calls for a fixed link to Suðuroy emerged after the success of the two earliest sub-sea tunnels in the Faroe Islands, the Vágatunnilin and Norðoyatunnilin in 2002 and 2006 respectively. The Suðuroyartunnilin was first referred to officially in the National Transport Plan for 2008–2020, stating no concrete ambitions.

The project was given more attention in the National Transport Plan 2012–2024, estimating an investment of 8 billion DKK for a 22.5 km tunnel from Dalur to Sandvík, but again without concrete ambitions. The idea has gained more public attention since the onset of the construction of the Eysturoyartunnilin (opened in December 2020) and Sandoyartunnilin (opened in December 2023).

The National Transport Plan for 2018-2030 lists the Suðuroyartunnilin again as an opportunity but no concrete plans to construct it. It recommends building the link in two sections, first from Sandoy to Skúvoy as a tunnel, bridge or causeway, and then onward to Suðuroy. It projected a costs range from 2.8 to 3.4 billion DKK, with an opening date of no earlier than 2030. The plan suggests a projected ridership of circa 1,000 vehicles per day in 2030. In 2019, Landsverk estimated ridership to be 800 motor vehicles per direction per day in 2030.

=== Concrete studies ===
In October 2021, public works authority Landsverk published a preliminary cost–benefit analysis scenario study that calculated the net present value for four tunnel options and two ferry options. This report was later published in English as Removing the Island Barrier. The expected ridership was now between 1,050 and 1,300 vehicles per day per direction, depending on the toll levels. The scenario study lists the following options:

Options for the link to Suðuroy
Option	Project type	Route	Net present value	Remarks
Status quo	Ferry service	Tórshavn (Streymoy) - Krambatangi (Suðuroy)	Not included	Most financially viable option. Lowest ranking in socio-economic benefits. Most CO2 emissions. The trip distance by sea is 59.3 kilometers.
1.	Road tunnel	Skarvanes (Sandoy) - Sandvík (Suðuroy)	-1.678 billion DKK	
2.	Road tunnel	Sandur (Sandoy) - Sandvík (Suðuroy)	-1.638 billion DKK	
3.	Road tunnel	Sandur (Sandoy) - Skúvoy - Sandvík (Suðuroy)	-1.735 billion DKK	Highest-ranking in socio-economic benefits.
4.	Car shuttle train tunnel	Sandur (Sandoy) - Sandvík (Suðuroy)	-4.205 billion DKK	Best option for CO2 emissions. Least financially viable option.
5.	Ferry service	Sandur (Sandoy) - Krambatangi (Suðuroy)	+72 million DKK	Closely following option 0. as the most financially viable option. The trip distance by sea would be 38.3 kilometres while the added distance by road measures 25 kilometers (using the Sandoyartunnilin to Tórshavn).

The total investment cost of a tunnel, excluding connecting roads would range from 3.6 to 5.4 billion DKK, corresponding roughly to one-quarter of the Faroese gross national income. At most 10% of the total costs could be recovered via tolls. Projected daily ridership for both directions combined ranges from 1,060 (option 5) to 1,370 motor vehicles per day (option 3). Parameters included in the analysis were operational costs, write-off (ferry Smyril), substitution effects, user prices (tolls or ferry tickets), demographic effects, employment effects, inflation and increase of wages, carbon dioxide emissions (during construction and operation) and the volume of debris generated in tunnel construction. As for option 5, the cost-benefit analysis did not consider the move of Suðuroy's ferry terminal northwards to Hvalba, which would further reduce the distance to 29.6 kilometres. It would, however, add 11 kilometers by road from Krambatangi.

In November 2022, the Faroese government agreed to go ahead with the project by establishing a limited company (p/F Suðuroyartunnilin) as a fund for budget deposits and later pay the contractor. In the meantime, the government put up the business plan and the sustainability assessment. In January 2023, the minister of Fisheries and Transport Dennis Holm suggested that drilling could already start within two years. However, he spoke outside his mandate, as the public enterprise was part of the Prime Minister's responsibility, who referred to the coalition agreement, which did not state dates.

=== First legislative proposal for on the Suðuroyartunnilin ===
On 8 November 2024 all Faroese political parties in the Løgting approved the ambition to develop the plan for the tunnel. On 11 November 2024, the Faroese government submitted the legislative proposal for an Act on the Suðuroyartunnilin (LM-072/2024) for first round of hearings to the Løgting. It was decided that the project will be constructed by a public enterprise, under the direct responsibility of the Løgmaður, Aksel Johannesen, using the limited company p/F Suðuroyartunnilin established by the government for the purpose. Public works authority Landsverk oversees and administrates the process. The dimensions of the two-lane, single-tube tunnel were set at 9.5 meters in diameter and a maximum gradient of 5 promille for the main tube.

No decision on the routing was taken, but the government suggested a preferential route from Skarvanes on Sandoy to Sandvík on Suðuroy, bypassing Skúvoy. A total of 4 billion DKK was estimated, with an projected 10 year completion time. This does not encompass a branch to Skúvoy, which was estimated at 200-400 million krónur as a separate project. New government negotiations and new background studies were initiated.

In June 2025, again no political consensus was reached after three rounds of hearings, which forced Løgmaður Aksel Johannesen to drop the legislative proposal and call for further studies into route options and costs.

=== Second legislative proposal for the Suðuroyartunnilin ===
In October 2025, the government submitted a new legislative proposal for the Act on the Suðuroyartunnilin (LM-066/2025) to the Løgting. The underlying documentation includes two routing scenarios and two construction approaches.

The legislative proposal to the Løgting is based on Scenario 1A and thus the referred scenario.. It is a tunnel between Djúpadalur on Sandoy and Sandvík on Suðuroy, with a branch to Skúvoy. The total length would be 24,297 meters, of which 22,247 meters for the main tube and 1,550 meters for the branch. The cost is now estimated to be 4.875-4.891 billion krónur. Construction require 10.1 years to complete after final political approval, including 2 years for detailed project planning and preparations, 5.5 years for the drilling, and 2.6 years for finishing. This give an earliest possible opening in 2036. This scenario includes several new roads on Sandoy, including a new highway from Traðardalur to Sandur, a bypass northeast around the village, and new highways (in tunnels, to circumnavigate the narrow Sandslíð cliff) to Djúpadalur.

Scenario 2A started north of Sandoy village and crosses Skúvoy on its western flank on its way to Suðuroy. The total length would be 28,145 meters, of which 26,275 for the main tube and 1,870 for the branch. While the tunnel would be longer, the total road distance and travel time between Streymoy and Suðuroy would be shorter than in Scenario 1A. The cost was estimated to be 5.351-5.369 billion krónur. Construction was estimated at 11.0 years to complete, giving an earliest possible opening in 2037.

Both Scenario 1A and 2A include a car parking at Skúvoy, by-pass roads in Sandvík and Hvalba, and a new tunnel between these latter villages. The estimated ridership is between 1240 and 1370 vehicles per day, depending on the chosen routing. In either scenario, the tunnel would be constructed by two drilling parties working simultaneously towards each other from Sandoy and Suðuroy. A third drilling party, starting at Skúvoy, was considered as scenarios 1B and 2B would result in additional cost (800 million krónur) and limited time gain. Part of the extra costs result from the significant port extensions required in order to set up the construction site and drills at the small island.

All Løgting party leaders unanimously endorsed the government's Scenario 1A days before the proposal was submitted. The proposal and political endorsement reinvigorated strong societal debate, in which especially inhabitants of Sandur village turned critical towards the suggested route and lack of local and political consultation. It is argued that Scenario 2A or 2B are preferred from both a societal, environmental and a long-term financial perspective. In a poll in November 2025 among 500 respondents (appr. 9% of the total population) showed a strong majority of Faroese in favour of Scenario 2B.

The Faroese National Bank (Landsbankin) warned against the enterprise arguing the national budget be insufficient to carry the investment and risk, irrespective of the tunnel's routing. The November 2025 poll also showed that the majority (54%) of Faroese only support the project if financially sound, while also a majority (56%) does not believe the project will be realised within 10–15 years. However, on 9 December 2025, the Løgting approved an amendment of the law to set up a public trust to enable interest-free, instalment-free loans for both the Suðuroyartunnilin and upgrades of Vágar Airport.

On 25 February 2026, the Løgting approved legislative proposal LM-066/2025 Act on the Suðuroyartunnilin with a majority of 26 votes, after a proposal to amend the Act to include also Scenario 2A in the preparations failed. Seconds after the vote, Løgmaður Aksel V. Johannesen walked to the Speaker, who immediately announced new elections. This move was reportedly due to a lack of confidence between the coalition partners. The Suðuroyartunnilin hinged on a political barter: Coalition party Framsókn would only support the Suðuroyartunnilin in exchange for support for a raise of the retirement age, but as support for the latter was waning, the Løgmaður feared also the Suðuroyartunnilin would lose support. The new elections were held on 26 March 2026.

== See also ==
- List of tunnels of the Faroe Islands
