= Strandfaraskip Landsins =

Government agency for public transport in the Faroe Islands

- Type: Public transport
- Headquarters: Tvøroyri, Faroe Islands
- Area served: North Atlantic
- Services: Passenger transportation Freight transportation
- Owner: Faroese Government
- Website: www.ssl.fo

Strandfaraskip Landsins routes. The ferry to Skopun ceased to operate in December 2023

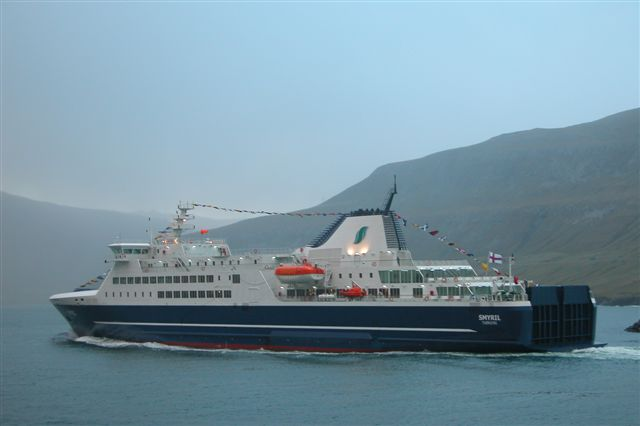
MS Smyril – the company's largest ship

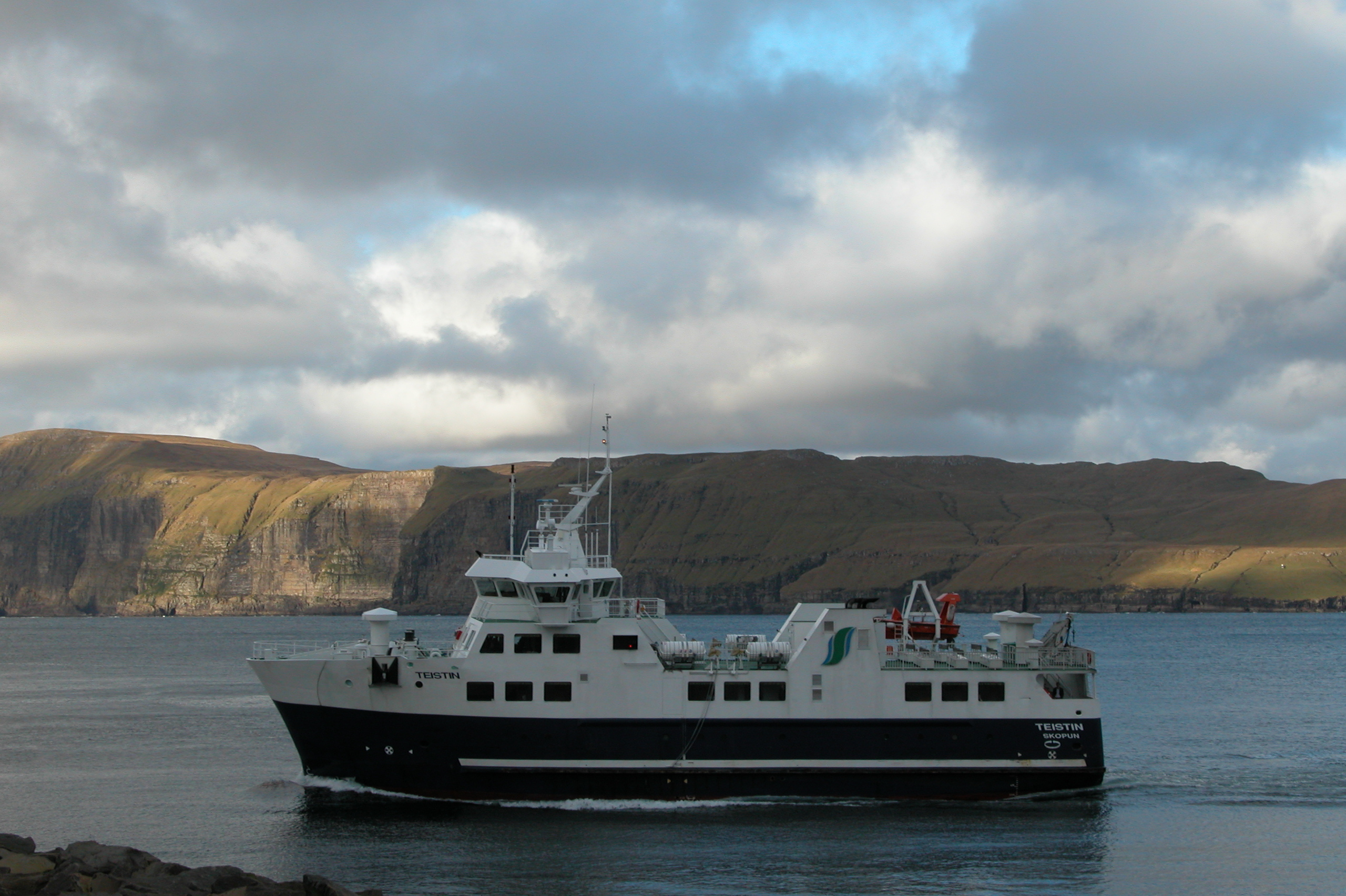
MS Teistin en route between Streymoy, Sandoy and Hestur islands

Strandfaraskip Landsins is the government agency for public transport in the Faroe Islands. It is owned by the Faroese national government under the Ministry of Finance (Fíggjamálaráðið) and runs seven ferry routes and a number of bus routes.

== History ==
Strandfaraskip Landsins was established in 1917 when the government took over the ferry Smiril from the brothers Petur og Niels Juel Mortensen from Suðuroy. They had bought the ship in 1895 and operated a scheduled service between Tórshavn and several ports in Suðuroy. In the first half of the 20th century, several other private regional services were founded, which combined freight, mail, passengers and milk transport to and from Tórshavn. Due to the lack of roads, ferries also served as a means for transport between villages-on-the-same-island. Many routes and vessels were taken over by Strandfaraskip Landsins in the 1960s and 1970s.

From 1960 onwards the road network was being extended rapidly and several private bus routes were founded. In 1980 the government agency Bygdaleiðir was established and tasked with the integrated bus network in central Streymoy, linking Tórshavn to the ferry service to Vágar, and on Sandoy. Several private companies were taken over in the subsequent years. Bygdaleiðir fused into Strandfaraskip Landsins in the 1990s.

In 1980 Strandfaraskip was appointed responsibility over the new helicopter network. This was transferred to Atlantic Airways in 1994. Strandfaraskip's freight branch was privatised in 2006, with the exception of public service obligations to the outer islands.

Until February 2008 the administration of Strandfaraskip Landsins was located in Tórshavn, but in 2007 Jacob Vestergaard, then-Minister of Internal Affairs, moved it to Tvøroyri on the island of Suðuroy. This served to decentralise jobs in the public sector and was a kind reminder of Strandfaraskip Landsins' roots in Suðuroy.

The name Strandfaraskip Landsins means 'national coastal transport', reminiscing of its original focus on seaborne transport. It is often referred to Strandferðslan or SSL. The ferry routes are known as oyggjaleiðir (Island routes) and bus routes as bygdaleiðir (Village routes).

== Ferries ==
Routes:

- route 7: Tórshavn (Streymoy) – Krambatangi (Suðuroy)
- route 36: Sørvágur (Vágar) – Mykines
- route 56: Klaksvík (Borðoy) – Syðradalur (Kalsoy)
- route 58: Hvannasund (Viðoy) – Svínoy – Kirkja and Hattarvík (Fugloy)
- route 61: Gamlarætt (Streymoy) – Hestur
- route 66: Sandur (Sandoy) – Skúgvoy
- route 85: Gamlarætt (Streymoy) – Skopun (Sandoy)
- route 90: Tórshavn (Streymoy) – Nólsoy

=== M/F Smyril – the ferry to Suðuroy ===
MS Smyril is the fifth Smyril in service between Tórshavn and Suðuroy since 1895, the name meaning merlin. She takes up 975 passengers and up to 200 cars and was built in 2005. The crossing over Suðuroyarfjørður takes two hours and five minutes in normal weather and swell conditions, though especially in winter trips are often cancelled or severely delayed. As of 2020 Smyril crosses the Suðuroyarfjør either twice-daily (3 days per week) or thrice-daily (4 days per week). It is common for Suðuroyingar to stay at friends or family in Tórshavn during weekdays, though others commute on a more-or-less daily basis.

The frequency has been topic of extensive public and political debate, where the islanders would be served best with three trips a day whereas the Faroese government also is concerned about the cost-efficiency. The crossing distance is 60 kilometres (37 mi).

The current ship allows for 3.5 return trips per day, based on a 30 minute turnaround time and a margin for delay, in a time window between 6:00 am and midnight. Since the Sandoyartunnilin opened in December 2023, Smyril could possibly reroute and use Sandur as its northern terminus, which would reduce the crossing distance down to 38 kilometres (24 mi). This would allow a frequency of five return trips per day, but the present port infrastructure cannot handle the large Smyril.

=== M/F Teistin – the ferry to Sandoy and Hestur ===
Teistin (black guillemot) operates the route between Gamlarætt on Streymoy and the island of Hestur. It takes 288 passengers and up to 33 cars. M/F Teistin was built on Skála Skipasmiðja in 2001. Teistin has a frequent schedule, it goes up to 5 return trips daily, all on request by telephone. Until 21 December 2023, when the Sandoyartunnilin opened, the vessel also operated the route between Skopun on Sandoy and Gamlarætt.

In addition to Teistin, the ferry Hasfjord has operated a cargo-only services on both routes since 2020. With a capacity of 12 passengers, she can also be used for passenger services in rare cases.

=== M/F Ritan – the ferry to Svínoy and Fugloy ===
For many years Másin sailed the route from the village of Hvannasund on Viðoy to the two smaller islands of Svínoy and Fugloy. Presently Ritan (kittiwake) which earlier plied the route between Tórshavn and Nólsoy, now sails this route.

=== M/F Ternan – the ferry to Nólsoy ===
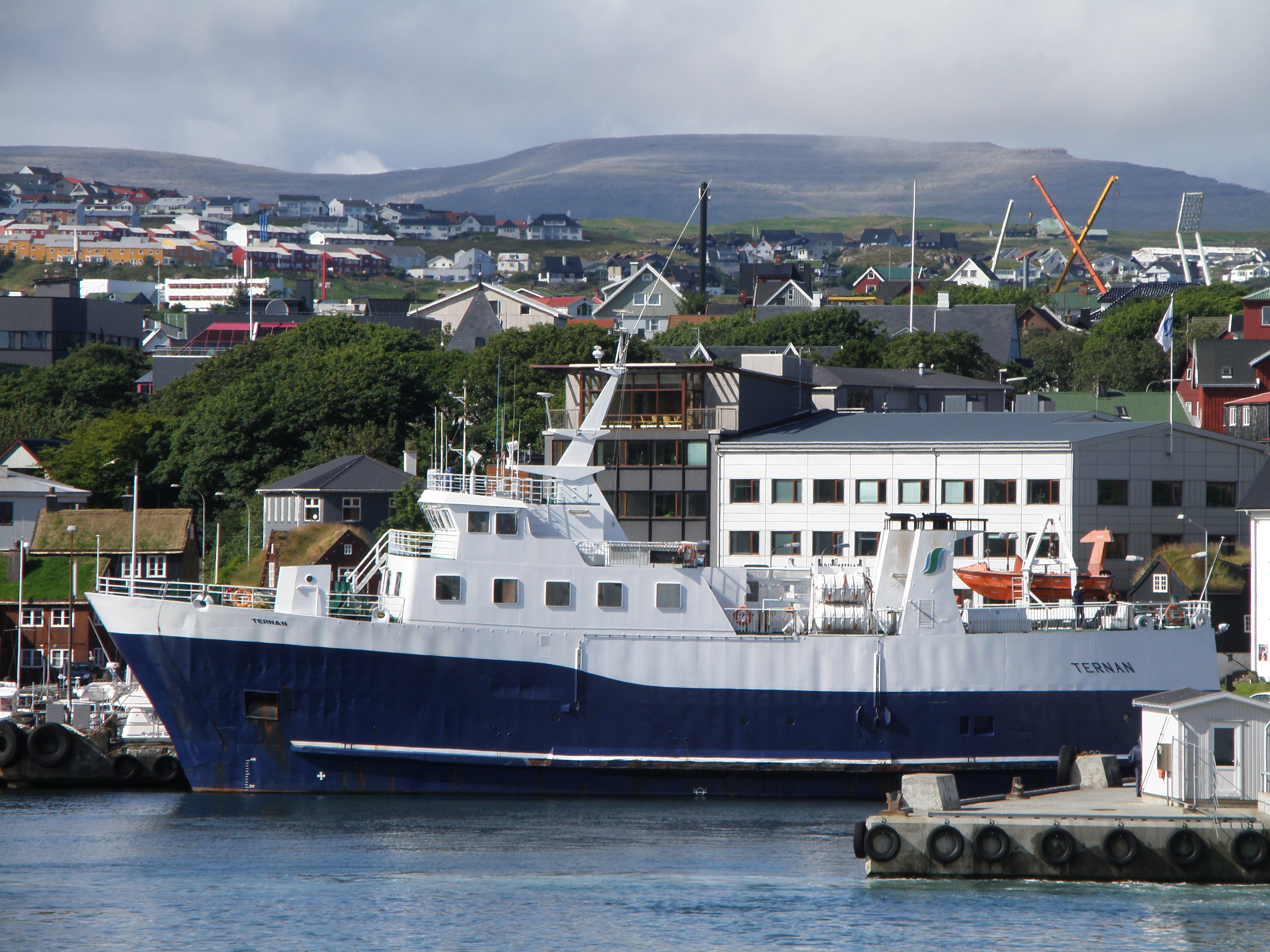
Ternan M/F in Tórshavn

M/F Ternan (Arctic tern) is the main ferry to Nólsoy, until December 2020, when the trimaran was (briefly) taken in use. Ternan earlier sailed the route to Sandoy, and before the subsea tunnel to Vágar opened in 2002, it shuttled together with Sam between Vágar and Vestmanna.

=== M/S Sam – the ferry to Kalsoy ===
M/F Sam was built in 1981 and was earlier in service on the route between Vágar and Vestmanna. Since the opening of the Vágatunnilin in 2002 Sam sails the route to Kalsoy; the first ro-ro car ferry to the island.

=== M/F Sildberin – the Skúgvoy ferry ===
M/F Sildberin was built in 2014 and plies the Skúgvoy-Sandur route. The name refers to the Atlantic puffin carrying sandeel (sild) in its beak.

=== HSC Erla Kongsdóttir – the replacement ferry ===
The construction of HSC Erla Kongsdóttir (white wagtail) was commissioned by Strandfaraskip Landsins in 2018 as a support ferry for other routes, especially when other ferries need maintenance (except route 7 to Suðuroy). Numerous similar high speed catamarans (hurtigbåt) have shown suitable for the Norwegian coast. She has place for up to three cars and is equipped with a ro-ro. Erla was delivered to the Faroe Islands in November 2020 and put in service on 7 December. Her maiden voyage was delayed due to misfitting ramps in Tórshavn and Nólsoy, especially at high and low tide. On the first official day of service, swell-related vibrations shattered several windows, leaving the ferry out of order for weeks. This propelled public debate about the use of high-speed catamarans in Faroese waters. It also raised questionmarks around Strandfaraskip Landsins' credibility, which at the same time was accused of being little forthcoming with its network redesign in response to the new Eysturoyartunnilin.

Another boat, Jósup, is regularly commissioned by Strandfaraskip to replace vessels that are out of order.

=== MF Herjólfur III – the extra freight ferry to Suðuroy ===
In May 2022 Strandfaraskip Landsins signed a long-term rent agreement with the Icelandic Road Administration Vegagerðin to lease the ferry Herjólfur III, which used to ply the route between the Icelandic Mainland and Vestmannaeyjar. The ferry will insert freight-only services on the Tórshavn-Suðuroy route to relieve Smyril, but will also take passengers when Smyril is out of service due to issues, maintenance or inspection. The lease lasts until at least autumn 2023.

=== Earlier sea routes replaced by subsea tunnels ===
The sub-sea tunnels to Vágar (2002) and the Northern Isles (2006) dismantled two important ferry links. Streymin Bridge (1943) and Norðoyatunnilin (1946) had suspended the ferry between Hósvík and Selatrað (1976) and Tórshavn-Toftir-Strendur (2003). The Sandoyartunnilin replaced the ferry link between Skopun and Gamlarætt in 2023. The proposed Suðuroyartunnilin would cease the need for seaborne routes to Skúgvoy and Suðuroy.

== Buses – Bygdaleiðir ==
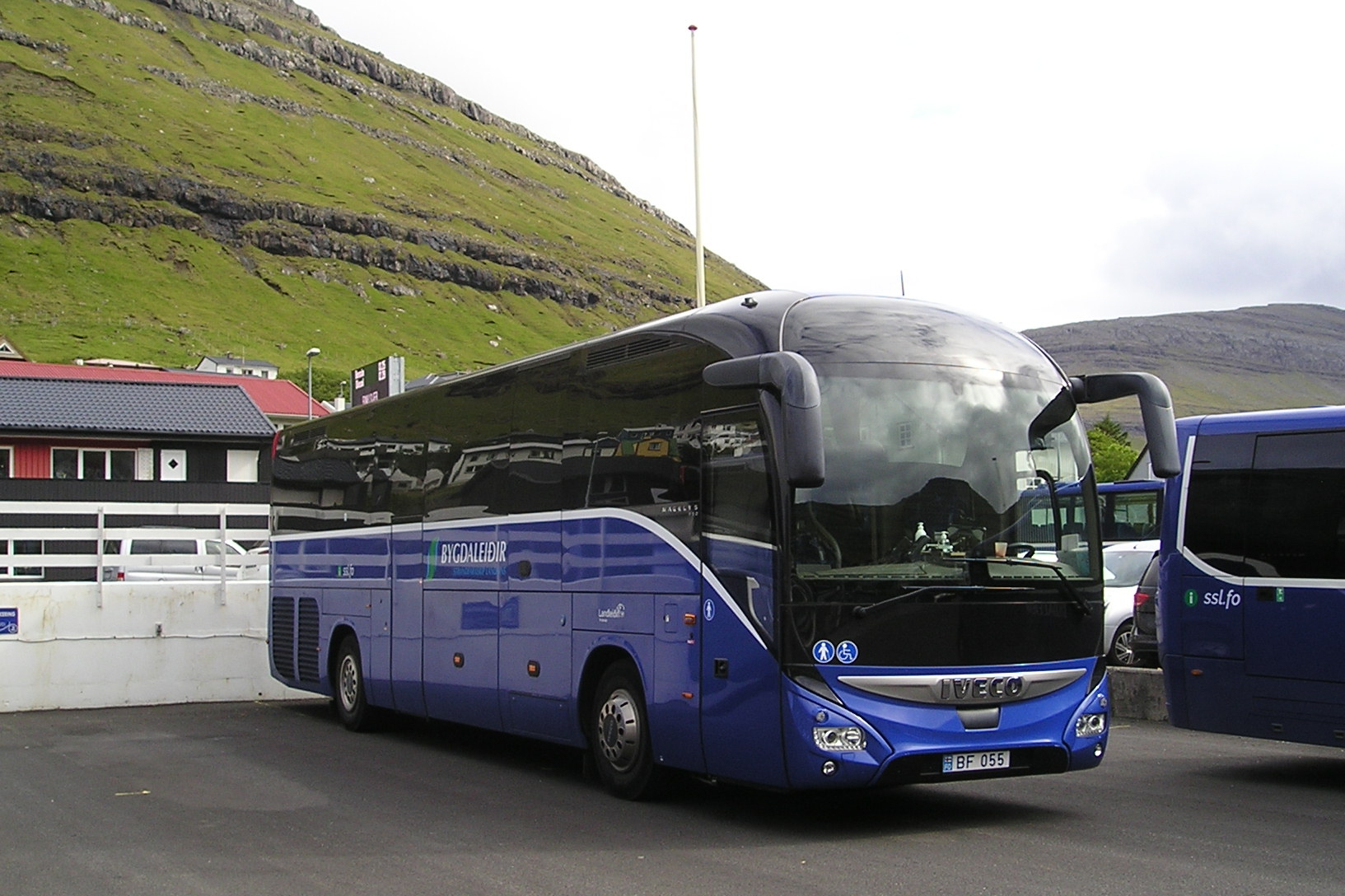
One of the Strandfaraskip Landsins buses

The bus network was moderately changed with the opening of the Eysturoyartunnilin in 2020. The network covers 22 routes as of July 2021:

- line 100: (Tórshavn Fárstøðin, limited services) – Kollafjørður (Effo) – Kollafjarðardalur (near Leynar) – Kvívík – Vestmanna
- line 200: Oyrarbakki – Eiði
- line 201: Oyrarbakki – via either Eiði or Funningsfjørður – Gjógv
- line 202: Oyrarbakki – Tjørnuvík
- line 300: Tórshavn (Fárstøðin) – Kollafjørður (Effo) – Kollfjarðardalur (near Leynar) – Sandavágur – Miðvágur – Vágar Airport – Sørvágur
- line 350: Tórshavn (Glasir) – (limited services stop at Fárstøðin) – Kollafjørður (Effo) – Kollfjarðardalur (near Leynar) – Sandavágur – Miðvágur – Sørvágur – Bøur – Gásadalur
- line 400: Tórshavn (Fárstøðin) – Kollafjørður (village) – Oyarbakki – Skálafjørður – Søldarfjørður – Norðragøta – Leirvík – Klaksvík (centre) – (limited services continue to Kalsoy ferry quay)
- line 401: Tórshavn (Fárstøðin) – Runavík – Søldarfjørður – Norðragøta – Leirvík – Klaksvík
- line 410: (Klaksvík – Leirvík, limited services) – Norðragøta – Kambsdalur – Fuglafjørður
- line 440, Skálafjarðarleiðin: (Selatrað, limited services) – Strendur – Skálafjørður – Søldarfjørður – Runavík – Toftir
- line 442: Runavík – Rituvík – Æðuvík
- line 444: Kambsdalur – Skálafjørður
- line 450, Tunnilsleiðin: Tórshavn (Fárstøðin) – Strendur, Runavík and/or Toftir – Tórshavn (Fárstøðin)
- line 481: Skálafjørður – Oyndarfjørður
- line 500: Klaksvík – Árnafjørður – Hvannasund (ferry for Svínoy and Fugloy) – Viðareiði
- line 504: Klaksvík – Haraldssund – Kunoy
- line 506: Syðradalur – Húsar – Mikladalur – Trøllanes
- line 600: Skopun – Inni í Dal ( – Sandur, limited services)
- line 601: Sandur (town hall; does not stop at Skúgvoy ferry quay) – Skálavík – Húsavík – Dalur
- line 650: Sandur (town hall) – ferry quay for Skúgvoy – Inni í Dal – Gamlarætt (Hestur ferry port) – Tórshavn (Landssjúkrahúsið (hospital), Steinatún and Fárstøðin)
- line 700: Tvøroyri – Krambatangi (ferjulegan, ferry port) – Øravík – Hov – Porkeri – Vágur – Lopra – Sumba
- line 701: Sandvík – Hvalba – Trongisvágur - Tvøroyri - Krambatangi (ferjulegan, ferry port) – Øravík – Fámjin

Several municipalities independently operate municipal routes called Bussleiðin, including a route from Kollafjørður, Kirkjubøur and Kaldbak to Tórshavn. Services are not synchronised with SSL services.

== Directors ==
The list is not complete

- 1 June 2014 – Hilmar Eliasen
- 13 January 2014 – Regin I. Jakobsen caretaker until 30 April 2014.
- From 16 December 2013 – Hans Jóhannes á Brúgv caretaker until 13 January, while Bogi Mortensen was on sick leave
- 1 February 2009 – Bogi Mortensen
- 1 May 2008 – 31 January 2009 Dánjal Andreasen
- 19 November 2007 – 30 April 2008 – Jákup Danielsen
- 1 May 2007 – 19 November 2007 – Regin Vágadal
- September 2006 – 30 April 2007 – Niels Juel Arge (yngri)
- 1 January 2003 – September 2006 – Kristian Davidsen
- January 1997 – December 2002 – Reidar Nónfjall
- October 1996 – January 1997 – Erling í Liða
- December 1994 – October 1996 – Thomas Arabo
- December 1992 – December 1994 – Thomas Magnussen
- 1991 – December 1992 – Johan Restorff Jacobsen
- 1989–1991 – Thomas Arabo
- 1981–1989 – Johan Restorff Jacobsen
- 1973–1981 – Thomas Arabo
- ca. 1965–1974 – Johan Restorff Jacobsen
- From the early 1960s - ca. 1965 – Dánjal Danielsen
- Borghild Schrøder, Evensen's wife takes over the administrative tasks and continues as administrator (director) until the mid 1960s
- From around 1920 Eivind Evensen is administrator (director) until he dies.
- From 1917 the ferry Smyril (Smiril) is run by the Faroese government, before that the Mortensen brothers in ran the ferry Tvøroyri

== See also ==
- MS Smyril – the flagship of the company
- Smyril Line – international ferry service (separate company)
- Transport in the Faroe Islands
