= Niels Winther Poulsen =

Danish politician

- Born: October 3, 1902; Skopun, Faroe Islands
- Died: March 19, 1990 (aged 87)
- Occupations: Teacher, politician
- Political party: Home Rule Party

Niels Christoffer Winther Poulsen (October 3, 1902 – March 19, 1990) was a Faroese teacher and politician for the Home Rule Party (Faroese: Sjálvstýrisflokkurin).

Poulsen was born in Skopun. He graduated as a teacher from the Jonstrup Normal School (Danish: Jonstrup Seminarium) in Denmark in 1928. Poulsen worked as a teacher in Hvalba from 1928 to 1931, in Sumba from 1932 to 1940, and in Skopun from 1940 to 1969. He was the director of the Faroese Teachers' Association (Faroese: Føroya Lærarafelag) from 1956 to 1959.

Poulsen served as the mayor of the Municipality of Sumba from 1935 to 1939, and later also for the Municipality of Skopun from 1950 to 1948. He was the municipal, school, and agriculture minister from 1959 to 1963, and then the local government, culture, and school minister from 1963 to 1967.
