= Inni í Dal =

Location on the island of Sandoy, The Faroe Islands

- Inni í Dal
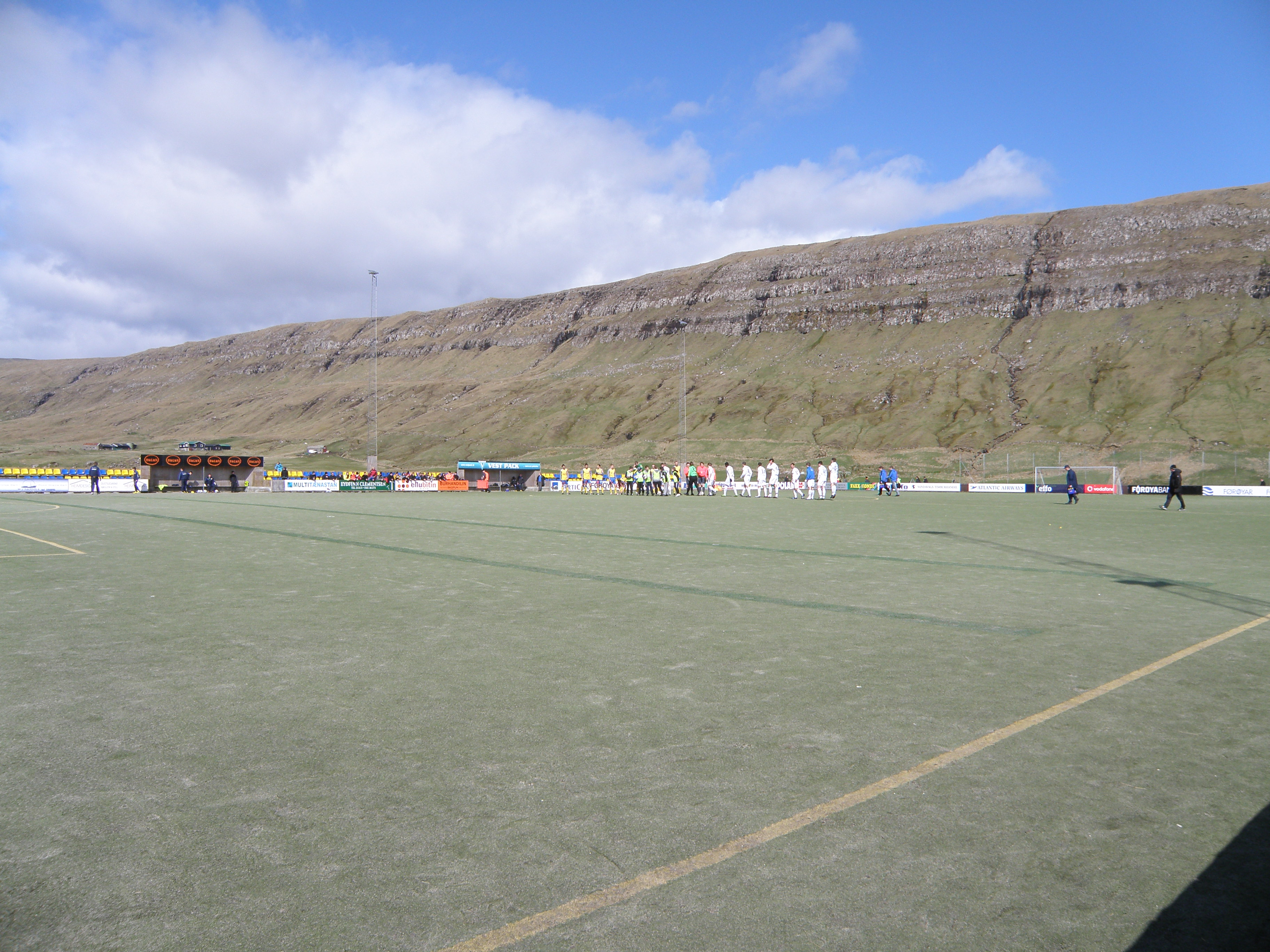
- Interactive map of Inni í Dal
- Location: Inni í Dal, Sandur, The Faroe Islands
- Coordinates: 61°51′36″N 6°49′44″W
- Owner: Sandoyar Skúlasamband
- Operator: B71 and Sandoyar Meginskúli
- Capacity: 300 seated
- Surface: Artificial grass with sand and cork pellets

Construction
- Opened: 1970
- Expanded: 2010

Tenant
- B71 (1970–present)

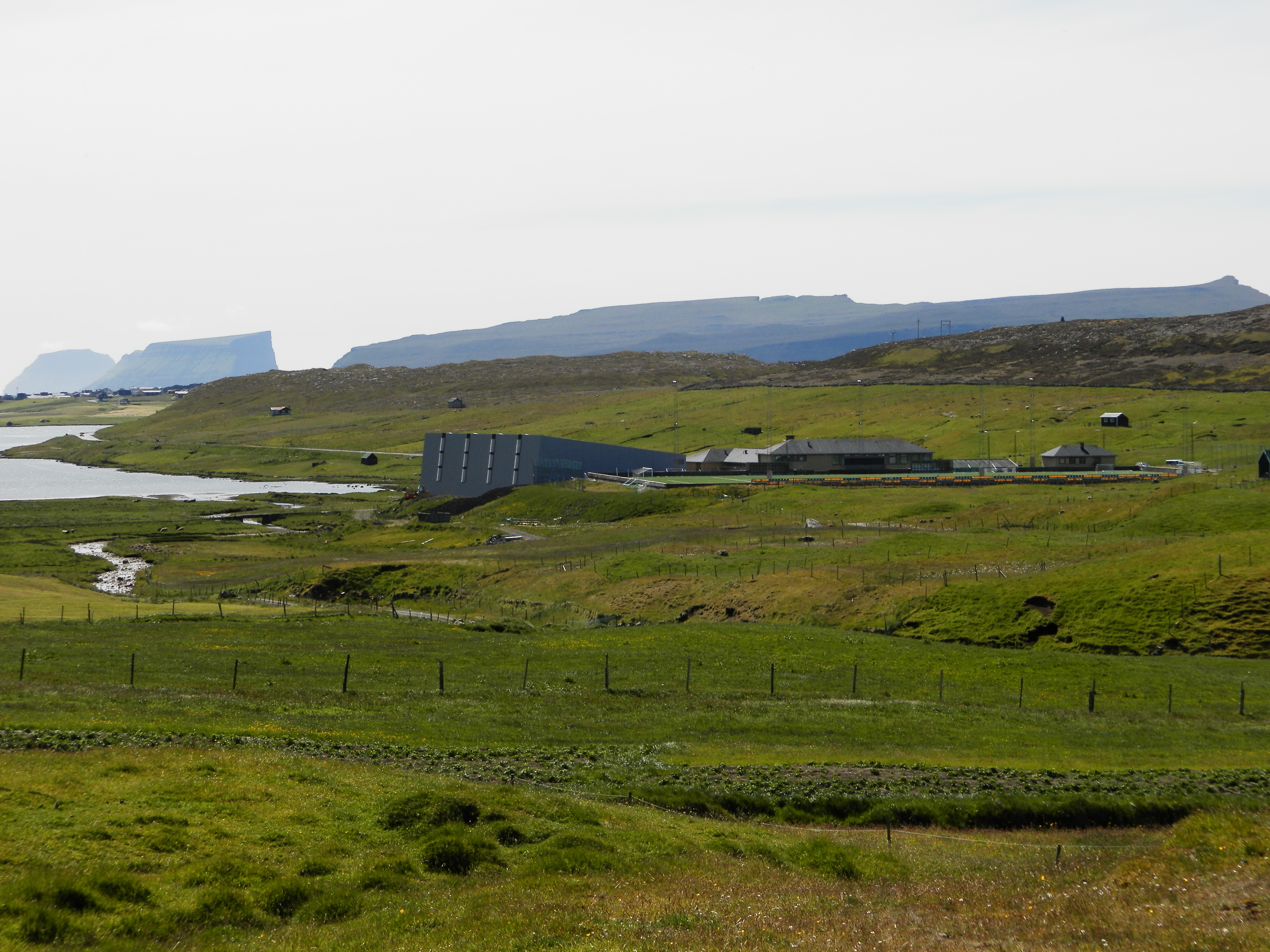
Inni í Dal, July 2012.

Inni í Dal, roughly translated to "In the Valley", is a location on the island of Sandoy, The Faroe Islands. Inni í Dal is the home ground of local football team B71, but also the location the joint public secondary school of Sandoy, Sandoyar Meginskúli.

== History ==
=== Construction ===
Since the municipalities on the island of Sandoy had begun construction of a new public school for the whole island and newly founded B71 needed a football-pitch, it seemed almost natural that the building of the school and football pitch would coincide. Both were constructed and ready for use in 1971.

=== The school and the pitch ===
There is somewhat of a unique link between school and team on Sandoy. Nowhere else on The Faroe Islands does a school share in the expenses of the local football-team, lease property out for free, while at the same time not sharing in the financial profits. Nonetheless, this has been the case since the founding of both school and team and there is a standing agreement that B71 uses the grounds, changing rooms, and other facilities for free.

=== Expansions ===
Although not remarkable, there have been some additions to the B71 facilities.

- Shop, open on match-day
- Various renovations regarding safety
- Renovation of technical areas
- Accommodation for television equipment
- Completion of seated area
- Deposit area for goals and grounds equipment

== Future and expansions ==
The completion of the 300-seat area in 2010 meant that one of the mandatory requirements set by UEFA had been met. The mandatory requirement for the next season was the complete renovation of the aging football pitch and other minor modifications to the ground, should B71 wish to play in the top league in 2011. Another mandatory requirement was subsequently met, when the artificial turf on the football pitch was replaced in time for the 2011 season.

Also in 2011, work started on building the new indoor sports hall, which was ready to use in November 2012.

B71 has resided the last couple of years, in a building next to the football pitch, close to the main road, in what is now being called "The B71 House".

The artificial turf football pitch at Inni í Dal was replaced after 14 years in 2025.

The Sandoyartunnilin under construction from Gamlarætt on Streymoy emerges at Traðardalur, near the Inni í Dal stadium.

Sandoyartunnilin was completed in 2023 and opened for the public on 21 December 2023
