= Fjords in the Faroe Islands =

List of landforms

Coordinates: 62.117°N 6.908°W

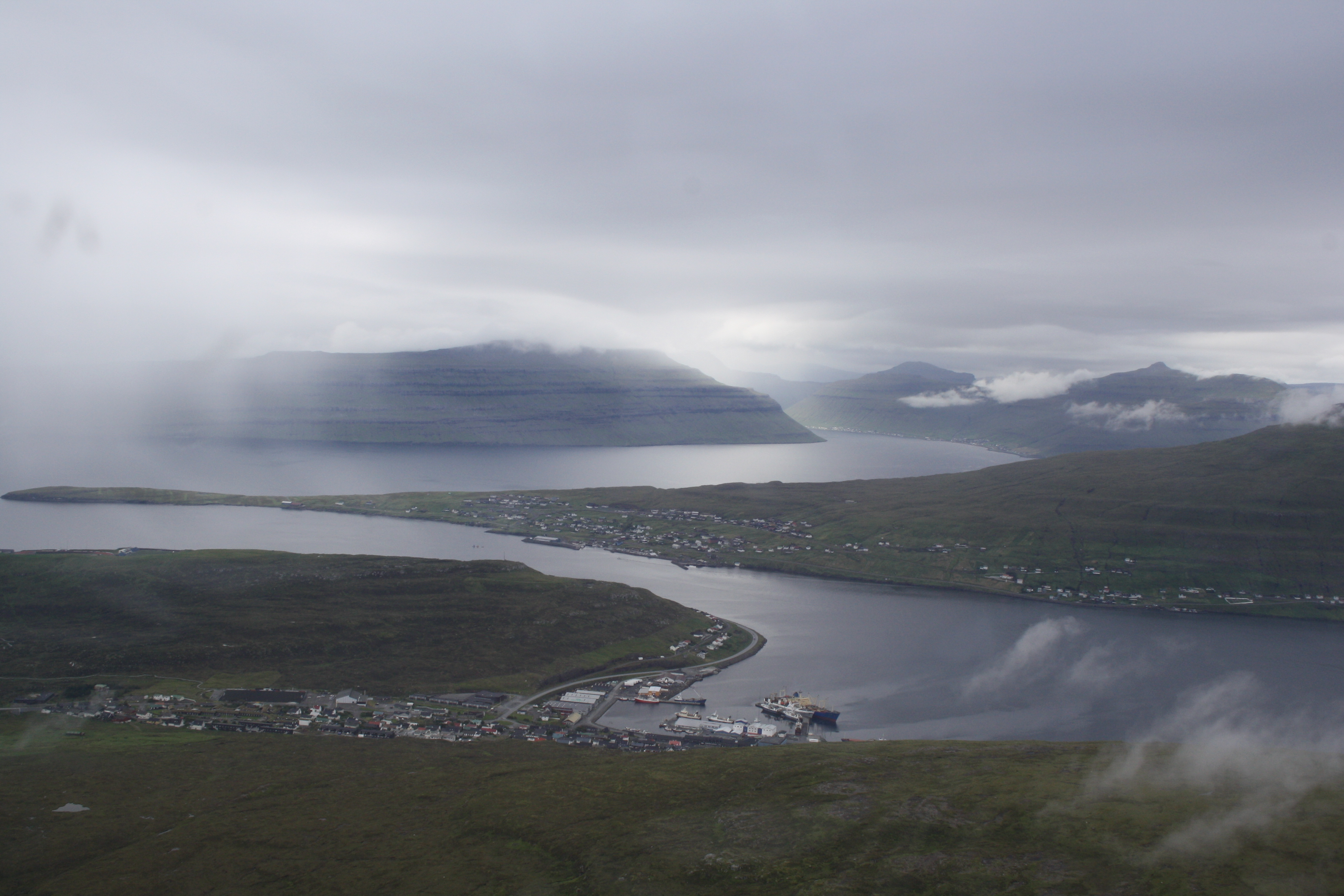
Overlooking Skálafjørður fjord (foreground), Tangafjørður strait (centre) and Kollafjørður fjord I (background). To the extreme left, the entrance to Kaldbaksfjørður is obscured by clouds.

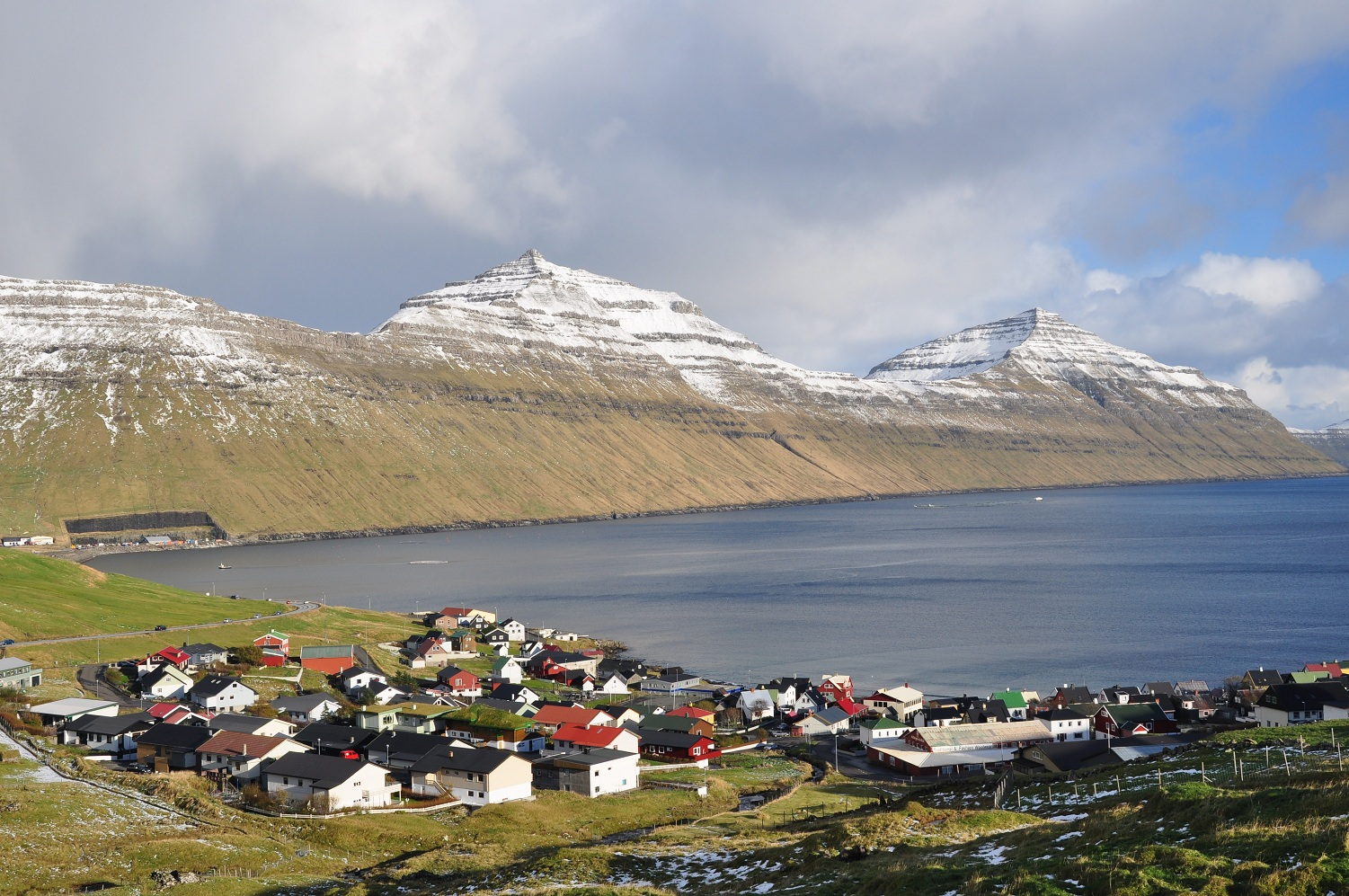
Gøtuvík (Eysturoy)

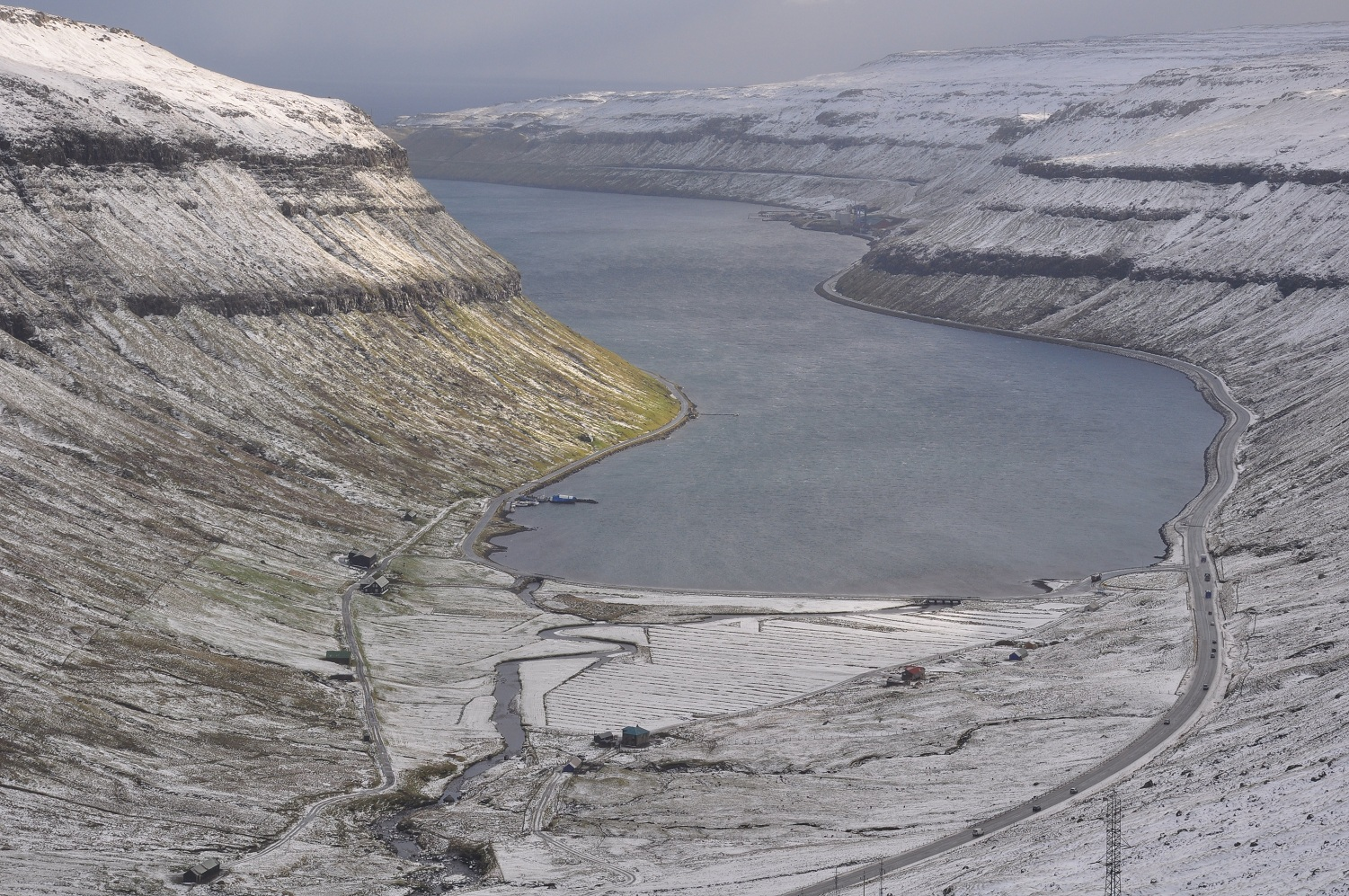
Kaldbaksfjørður (Streymoy)

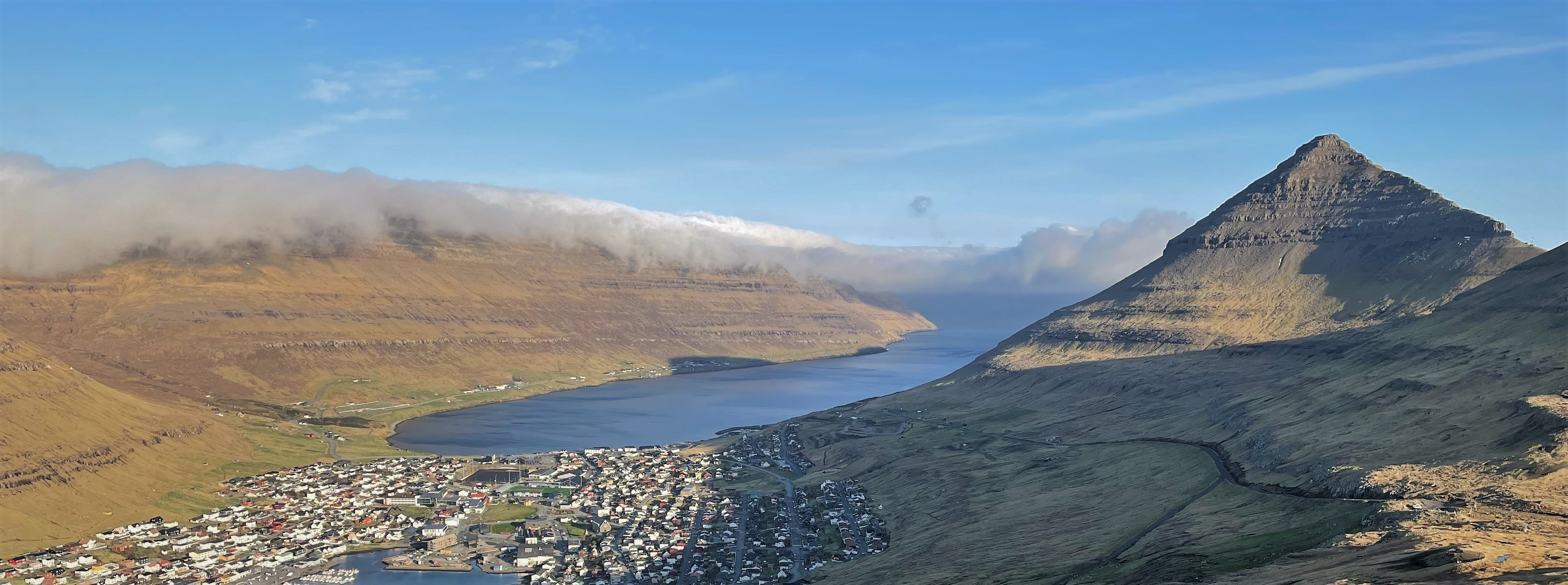
Borðoyarvík (Borðoy)

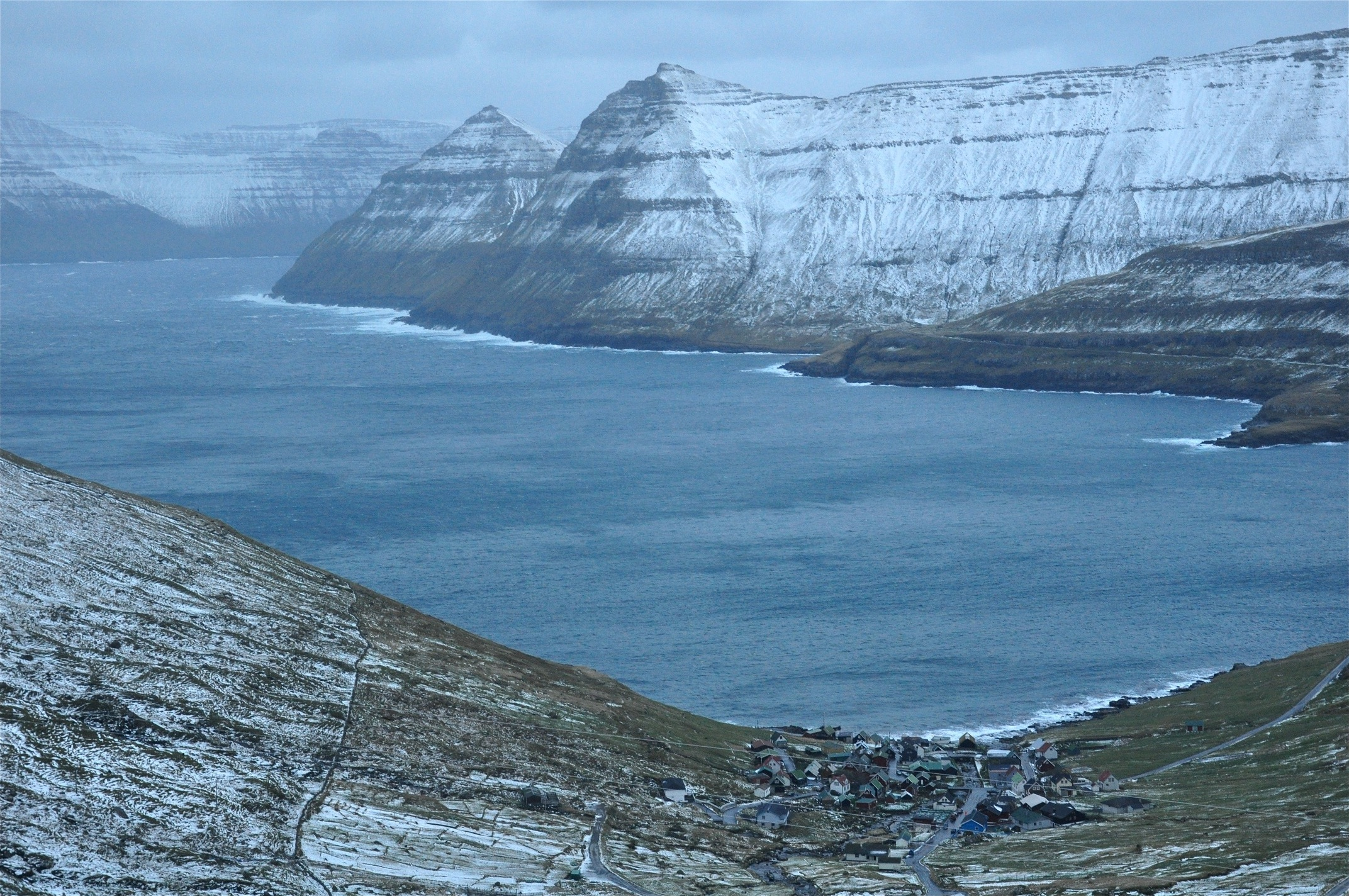
Funningsfjørður (Eysturoy)

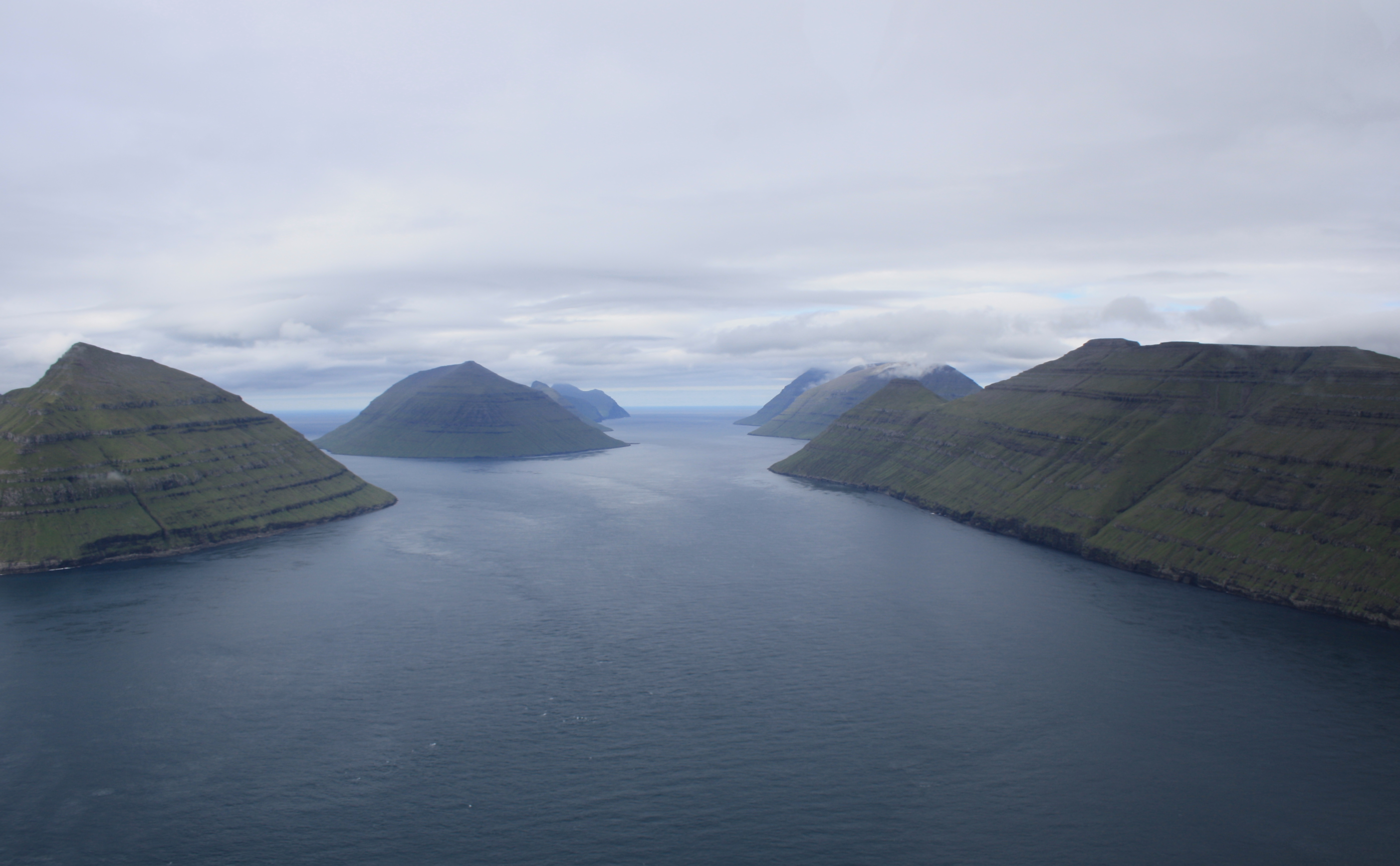
The Leirvíksfjørður between the islands of Eysturoy (left) and Borðoy (right). Farther away in the north, the Kalsoyarfjørður and a small part of Djúpini are visible.

The Faroe Islands consist of 18 islands, several of which are deeply incised by fjords.

== Terminology ==
The Faroese word for fjord, fjørður (plural firðir), can indicate both inlets and firths (which corresponds with how the word fjord is used in English), and channels between islands. This holds true for both the suffix in geographical names and for everyday speech.

- -fjørður (plural: firðir): either a narrow inlet, firth approaching an inlet, or a strait between islands.
- -sund (plural: sundini): sound, narrow channel.
- -vík: V-shaped bay or inlet
- -pollur(in): small round bay, anchorage
- -vágur (plural: vágar): small elongated bay
- -botnur: head of a fjord, bottom, cirque.

Water suffixes in other Scandinavian names are often Faroenised, e.g. Limfjørður for Limfjord in Denmark and St. Georgesfjørður for Saint George's Channel between Wales and Ireland. In a few cases Faroese exonyms exist, such as Oyrarsund (Øresund) and Ermarsund (English Channel).

Fjords and straits also act as cultural boundaries, for example linguistically (as isoglosses) and as identity markers. For example, the Skopunarfjørður serves as the cultural delineation of norðanfjørðs ("north of the strait", Northern Faroe) and sunnanfjørðs ("south of the strait", Southern Faroe).

== Fjords and firths in the Faroe Islands ==
This list includes all 'traditional' dead-ending fjords with the suffix -fjørður. In some cases, the name more strictly refers to the seaward approaches to the inlet, rather than the sheltered reaches of the inlet. In this list, these are indicated by the cognate word firth.

- Árnafjørður (Borðoy)
- Funningsfjørður (Eysturoy)
- Oyndarfjørður (Eysturoy)
- Fuglafjørður (Eysturoy)
- Skálafjørður (Eysturoy)
- Kollafjørður (Streymoy)
- Kaldbaksfjørður (Streymoy)
- Sørvágsfjørður (firth towards Sørvágur, Vágar)
- Hvalbiarfjørður (Suðuroy)
- Trongisvágsfjørður (firth branching into Trongisvágur and Øravík, Suðuroy)
- Hovsfjørður (Suðuroy)
- Vágsfjørður (firth branching into Vágur and Lopransfjørður, Suðuroy)
- Lopransfjørður (Suðuroy)
- Víkarfjørður (Suðuroy)
- Mýarfjørður (firth in Suðuroy)

In addition, the village of Søldarfjørður is situated on the Skálafjørður coast, but no fjord-of-the-same name exists.

== Straits in the Faroe Islands ==
Ending with -fjørður:

- Fugloyarfjørður (Fugloy, Svínoy and Viðoy)
- Svínoyarfjørður (Svínoy, Viðoy and Borðoy)
- Kalsoyarfjørður (Kalsoy and Kunoy)
- Lervíksfjørður (Eysturoy, Borðoy and Kalsoy)
- Tangafjørður (Eysturoy and Streymoy)
- Nólsoyarfjørður (Streymoy and Nólsoy)
- Mykinesfjørður (Vágar and Mykines)
- Vágafjørður (gulf between Vágar, Streymoy and Koltur)
- Hestfjørður (Koltur, Hestur and Streymoy)
- Skopunarfjørður (Hestur, Streymoy and Sandoy)
- Skúvoyarfjørður (Sandoy and Skúvoy)
- Dímunarfjørður (Skúvoy and Stóra Dímun)
- Suðuroyarfjørður (Stóra Dímun and Suðuroy, on either side of Lítla Dímun)

Ending with a different suffix:

- Hvannasund (Viðoy and Borðoy)
- Haraldssund (Borðoy and Kunoy)
- Djúpini (Kalsoy and Eysturoy)
- Sundini (Eysturoy and Streymoy)
- Vestmannasund (Streymoy and Vágar)
- Kolturssund (Koltur and Hestur)

Of these straits, six are crossed by fixed road links and ten by ferries.

== Major bays and inlets with a different suffix ==
- Viðoy: Viðvík
- Svínoy: Svínoyarvík
- Borðoy: Árnafjarðarvík, Borðoyarvík, Pollur, Vágur (Klaksvík)
- Eysturoy: Pollurin (Fuglafjørður), Gøtuvík, Lambavík, Rítuvík, Kongshavn and Eiðisflógvi.
- Streymoy: Tjørnuvík, Pollurin (Saksun), Hvalvík, Vestmannahavn, á Dølunum and Tórshavn.
- Vágar: Miðvágur, Sandavágur, Sørvágur and Víkin.
- Sandoy: Sandsvágur, Grótvík and Húsavík.
- Suðuroy: Sandvík.
