= Vágatunnilin =

Undersea road tunnel in the Faroe Islands

Coordinates: 62.11°N 7.08°W

- Interactive map of Vágatunnilin

Overview
- Location: Vágar and Streymoy, Faroe Islands
- Status: In operation

Operation
- Work began: 2000
- Opened: 2002
- Operator: Tunnil P/f
- Traffic: Automotive
- Toll: Yes
- Vehicles per day: 3,069 (2024-2025)

Technical
- Length: ca. 4,940 m (16,210 ft)
- No. of lanes: 2
- Operating speed: 80 km/h (50 mph)
- Max elevation: 43.5 m (143 ft)
- Min elevation: 105 m (344 ft)
- Tunnel clearance: 4.6 m (15 ft)
- Width: 7.0 m (23.0 ft)
- Grade: 6.9%

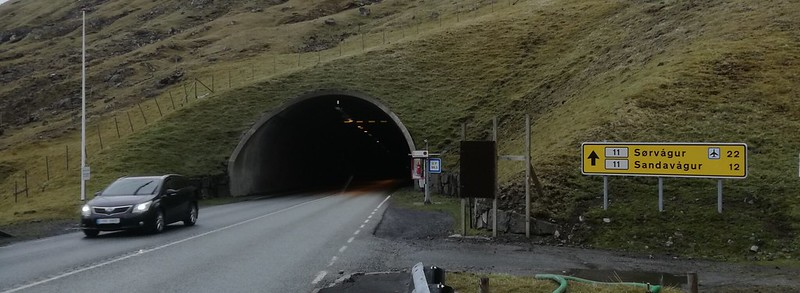
Vágatunnilin's eastern entrance on Streymoy

The Vágatunnilin (Vágar Tunnel) is a 4,940 m (16,210 ft) undersea road tunnel in the Faroe Islands. It goes under Vestmannasund Strait and connects the two islands of Streymoy and Vágar. The tunnel was the first undersea tunnel in the Faroe Islands and connects the capital of Tórshavn, on Streymoy, with Vágar Airport, on Vágar.

== History ==
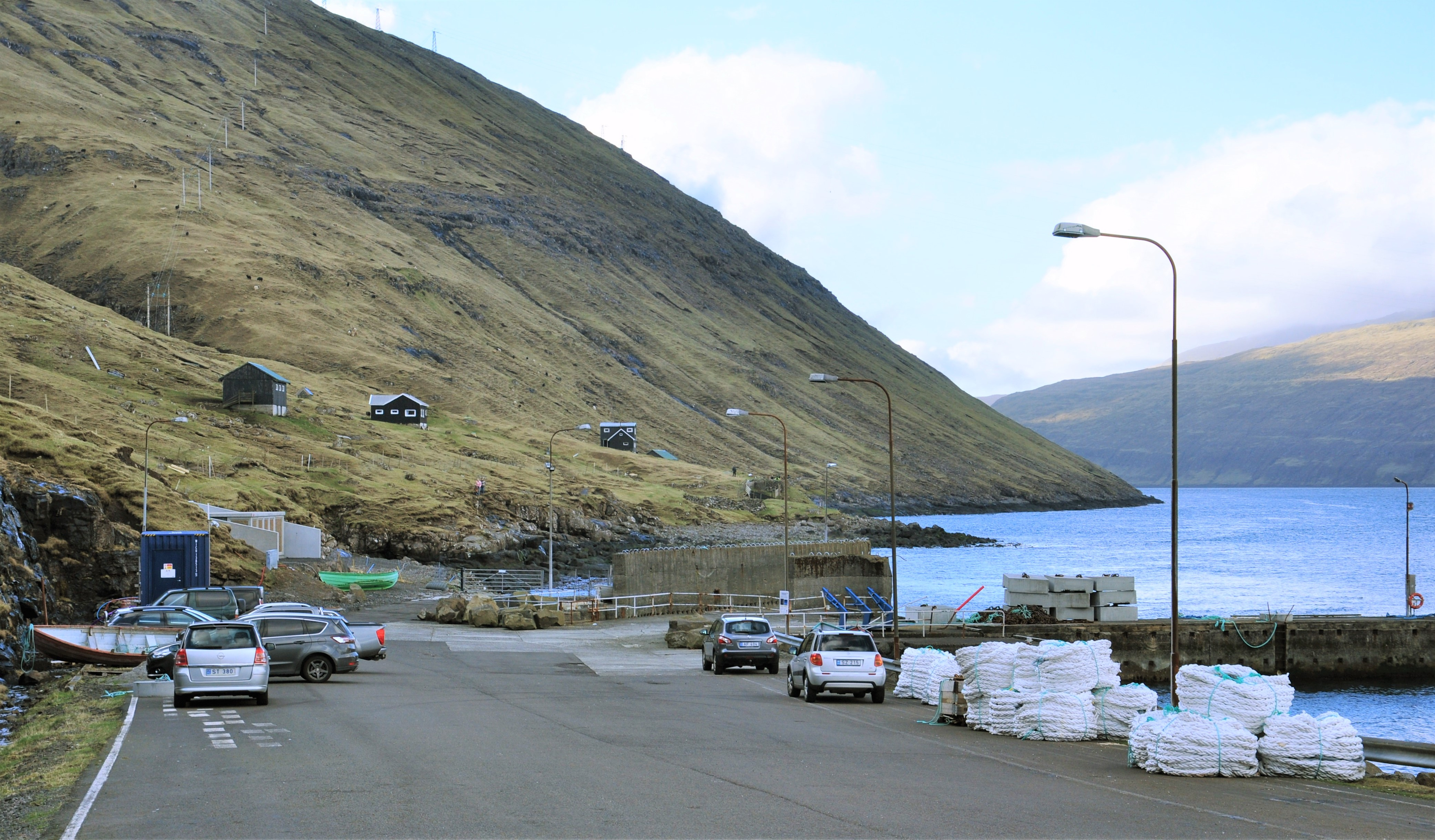
The disused ferry terminal at Oyrargjógv

Surveyor drills were executed in 1988, and construction was planned to start in 1989. However, the onset of the economic crisis, almost all infrastructural projects were suspended, including the Vágatunnilin. Only the construction of Gamlarætt, a new ferry port to Sandoy, continued.

After the false start, the second attempt at construction started on 28 September 2000. The tunnel was opened for public traffic was 10 December 2002. Traffic has steadily increased from 359,440 vehicles in 2003 to 1,073,558 in 2024 (2,933 per day).

Before the tunnel was opened, a ferry across the Vestmannasund between Vestmanna and Oyrargjógv was operated by Strandfaraskip Landsins. Both ferry docks are now in disuse.

== Characteristics ==
The tunnel has a two-lane road 7 m (23 ft) wide. Its deepest point is 105 m (344 ft) below sea level. There is a road toll, which pays for the maintenance for the tunnel`s maintenance. The investment of 240 million Danish kroner was paid back at 10 December 2016, exactly 14 years after opening.

== See also ==
- List of tunnels of the Faroe Islands
