= Hestur =

- Island
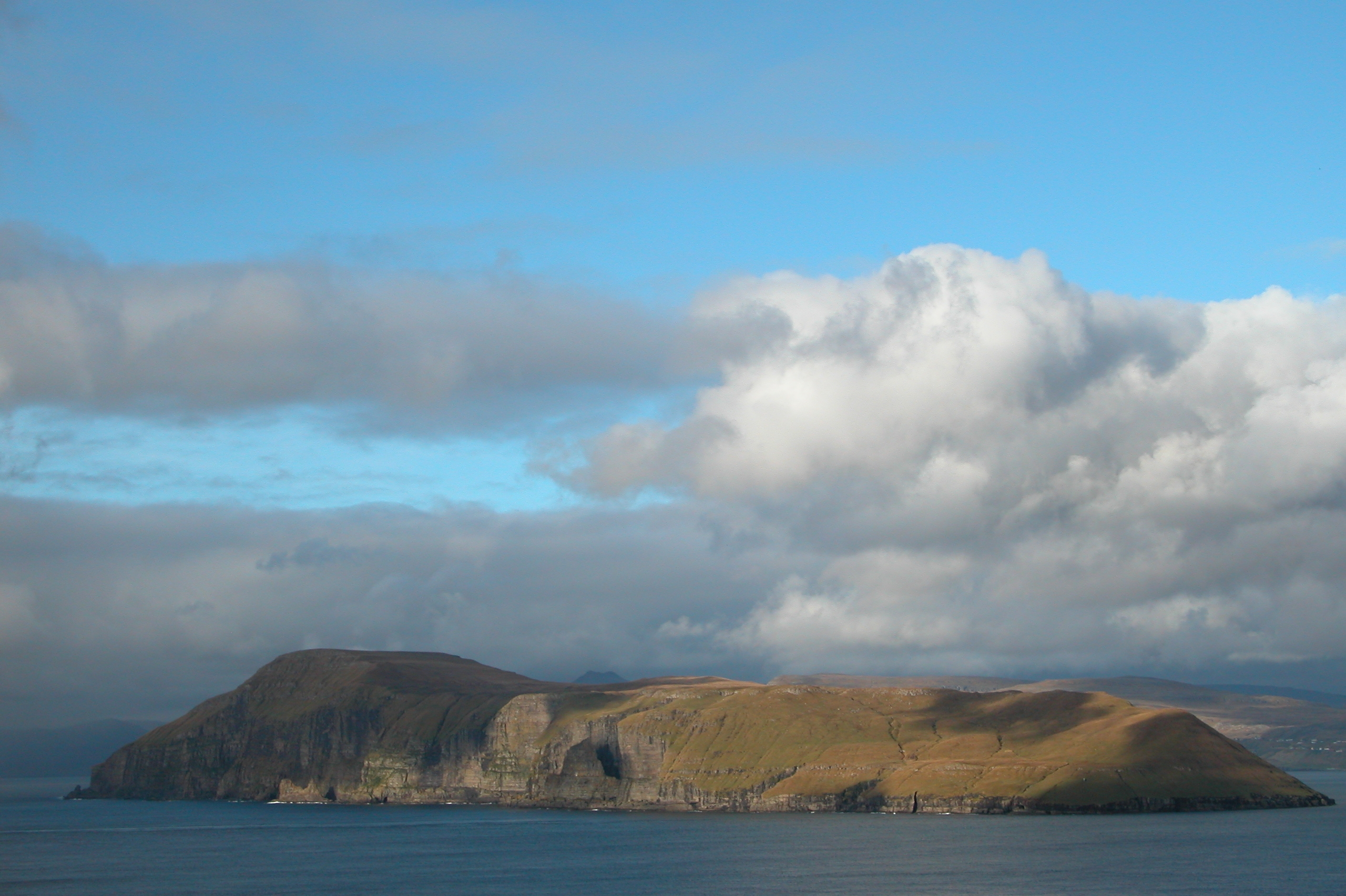
- West coast of Hestur

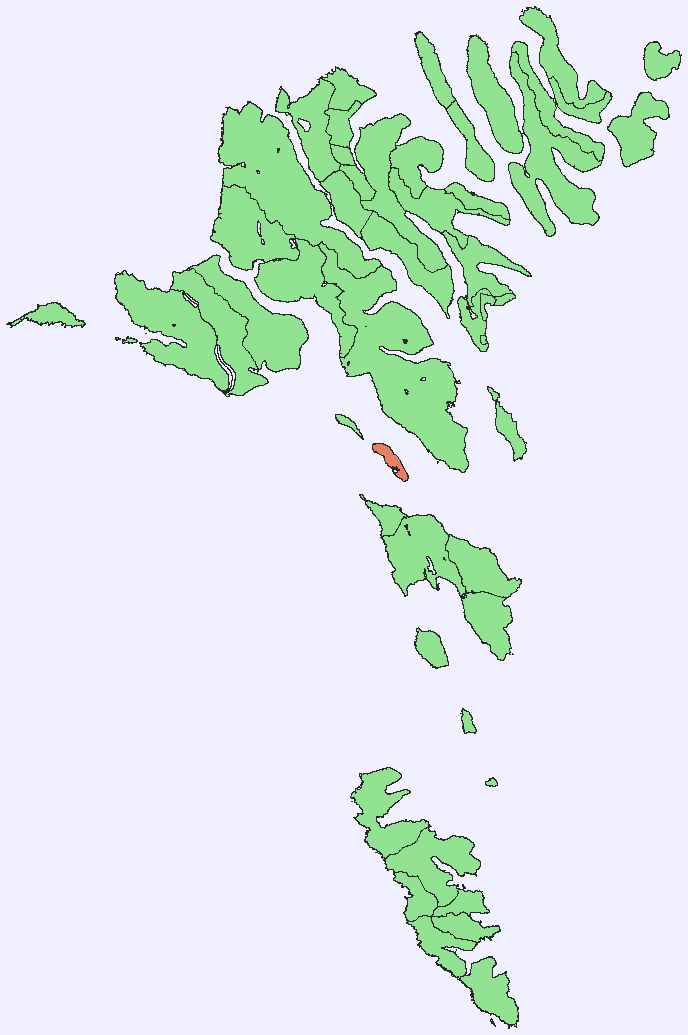
- Location within the Faroe Islands
- Coordinates: 61°57′10″N 6°53′40″W
- State: Kingdom of Denmark
- Constituent country: Faroe Islands

Area
  - Total: 6.1 km^{2} (2.4 sq mi)
  - Rank: 15
- Highest elevation: 421 m (1,381 ft)

Population (29 April 2025)
  - Total: 16
  - Rank: 13
  - Density: 2.6/km^{2} (6.8/sq mi)
- Time zone: UTC+0 (GMT)
  - Summer (DST): UTC+1 (EST)
- Postal code: FO 280
- Calling code: 298

Hestur (Danish: Hestø) is an island in the central Faroe Islands, to the west of Streymoy and the south of Koltur. Hestur means horse in Faroese.

On the west coast is a guillemot colony. In the north there is moorland with four small lakes, of which Fagradalsvatn is the largest. At Hælur, Hestur's southernmost tip, there is a lighthouse. The island has one settlement, a village also named Hestur on the east coast. The village enjoys the view over to Gamlarætt and Velbastaður on Streymoy. There is a ferry link to the port at Gamlarætt.

== History ==
The island has been settled since Viking times; the old settlement was at Hælur, the southern tip of the island. Due to it being the sunward side of the island, cereal ripened better there than anywhere else on the island. But due to extreme difficulties in landing boats there, the village was abandoned and the current village of Hestur was established.

On 1 April 1919, two of the village's fishing boats went missing in a storm while returning to a safe harbour, resulting in the deaths of 11 men. This was approximately half of the island's adult male population at the time, causing considerable grief and economic hardship for the village.

In an attempt to fight the depopulation of the village, a swimming pool was built on the island. It opened in connection with the village hall in 1983. On the southern part of the island by the lake Fagradalsvatn, one can camp. Hestur's postal code is FO 280. Since 1 January 2005 the island has been part of the municipality of Tórshavn.

== Important bird area ==
The coastline of the island has been identified as an Important Bird Area by BirdLife International because of its significance as a breeding site for seabirds, especially Atlantic puffins (25,000 pairs), European storm petrels (5000 pairs) and black guillemots (50 pairs).

== Mountains ==
The island has the following four mountains

Name	Height
Múlin	421 m
Eggjarrók	421 m
Nakkur	296 m
Álvastakkur	125 m

== Gallery ==
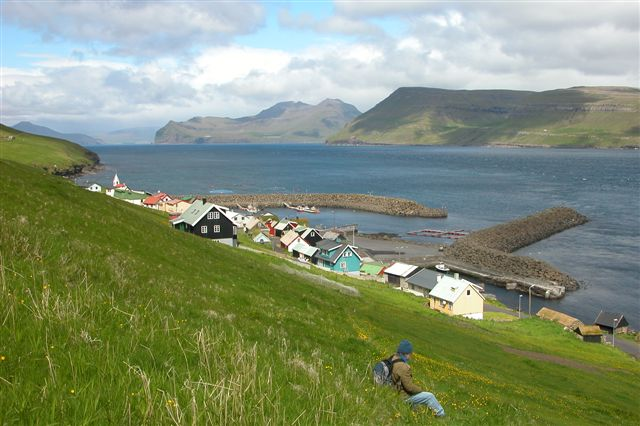
Hestur

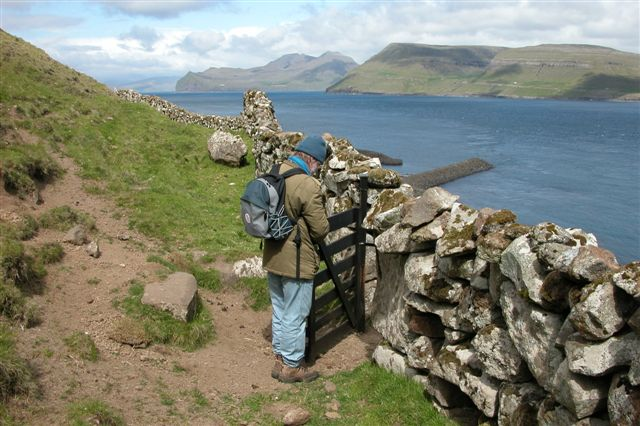
Hestur

== See also ==
- List of towns in the Faroe Islands
