= Demographics of the Faroe Islands =

Demographic features of the population of the Faroe Islands include population density, ethnicity, education level, health of the populace, economic status, religious affiliations and other aspects of the population. The vast majority of the population are ethnic Faroese, of North Germanic descent. Ethnic Faroese are, in genetic terms, among the most homogenous groups ever found.

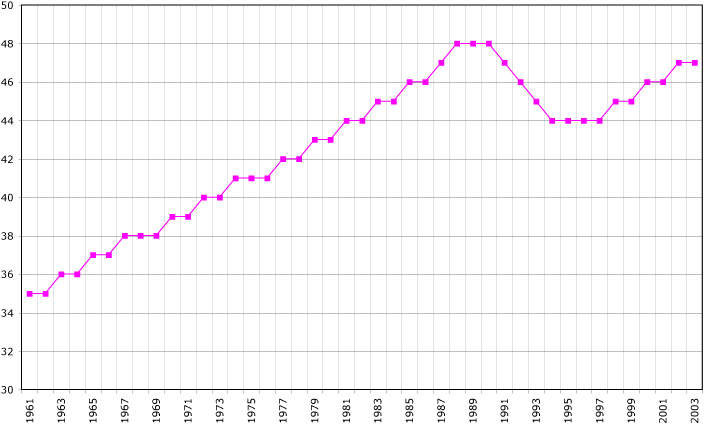
Demographics of the Faroe Islands, Data of FAO, year 2005; Number of inhabitants in thousands.

A 2004 DNA analysis revealed that Y chromosomes, tracing male descent, are 87% Scandinavian. The studies show that mitochondrial DNA, tracing female descent, is 84% Scottish/Irish.

Of the approximately 48,000 inhabitants of the Faroe Islands (16,921 private households (2004)), 98% are Danish realm citizens, meaning Faroese, Danish, or Greenlandic. By birthplace one can derive the following origins of the inhabitants: born on the Faroes 91.7%, in Denmark 5.8%, and in Greenland 0.3%. The largest group of foreigners are Icelanders comprising 0.4% of the population, followed by Norwegians and Poles, each comprising 0.2%. Altogether, on the Faroe Islands there are people from 77 different nationalities. The Faroe Islands have the highest rate of adoption in the world, despite a relatively high fertility rate of 2.6 children.

Faroese is spoken in the entire country as a first language. It is not possible to say exactly how many people worldwide speak the Faroese language.

The 2011 census, called Manntal, shows that 10% were not born in the Faroe Islands, but of these only 3% were born outside the Kingdom of Denmark. 6.5% of people older than 15 did not speak Faroese as their mother tongue. 33 persons said that they did not understand Faroese at all. According to the 2011 census, 45 361 Faroese people (people living in the Faroes) spoke Faroese as their first language and 1546 spoke Danish as their first language.

== Vital statistics since 1900 ==
	Average population	Live births	Deaths	Natural change	Crude birth rate (per 1000)	Crude death rate (per 1000)	Natural change (per 1000)	Total Fertility Rate
1900	15,000	455	233	222	30.3	15.5	14.8	
1901	15,300	457	228	229	29.9	14.9	15.0	
1902	15,600	502	217	285	32.2	13.9	18.3	
1903	15,900	435	199	236	27.4	12.5	14.8	
1904	16,200	489	234	255	30.2	14.4	15.7	
1905	16,500	498	296	202	30.2	17.9	12.2	
1906	16,700	493	229	264	29.5	13.7	15.8	
1907	17,000	479	196	283	28.2	11.5	16.6	
1908	17,300	576	182	394	33.3	10.5	22.8	
1909	17,600	528	196	332	30.0	11.1	18.9	
1910	17,900	576	157	419	32.2	8.8	23.4	
1911	18,200	559	164	395	30.7	9.0	21.7	
1912	18,600	624	184	440	33.5	9.9	23.7	
1913	18,900	650	169	481	34.4	8.9	25.4	
1914	19,200	580	182	398	30.2	9.5	20.7	
1915	19,600	643	288	355	32.8	14.7	18.1	
1916	19,900	636	261	375	32.0	13.1	18.8	
1917	20,200	570	240	330	28.2	11.9	16.3	
1918	20,600	625	199	426	30.3	9.7	20.7	
1919	20,900	607	221	386	29.0	10.6	18.5	
1920	21,200	665	227	438	31.4	10.7	20.7	
1921	21,500	614	230	384	28.6	10.7	17.9	
1922	21,800	668	211	457	30.6	9.7	21.0	
1923	22,100	652	255	397	29.5	11.5	18.0	
1924	22,400	631	268	363	28.2	12.0	16.2	
1925	22,700	599	228	371	26.4	10.0	16.3	
1926	23,000	592	199	393	25.7	8.7	17.1	
1927	23,300	579	157	422	24.8	6.7	18.1	
1928	23,600	620	194	426	26.3	8.2	18.1	
1929	23,900	575	253	322	24.1	10.6	13.5	
1930	24,200	633	273	360	26.2	11.3	14.9	
1931	24,500	607	239	368	24.8	9.8	15.0	
1932	24,700	604	210	394	24.5	8.5	16.0	
1933	25,000	545	248	297	21.8	9.9	11.9	
1934	25,300	578	231	347	22.8	9.1	13.7	
1935	25,600	585	269	316	22.9	10.5	12.3	
1936	25,900	565	265	300	21.8	10.2	11.6	
1937	26,200	615	212	403	23.5	8.1	15.4	
1938	26,600	617	241	376	23.2	9.1	14.1	
1939	26,900	577	182	395	21.4	6.8	14.7	
1940	27,300	698	228	470	25.6	8.4	17.2	
1941	27,600	690	286	404	25.0	10.4	14.6	
1942	28,000	721	250	471	25.8	8.9	16.8	
1943	28,300	804	235	569	28.4	8.3	20.1	
1944	28,700	732	247	485	25.5	8.6	16.9	
1945	29,000	718	247	471	24.8	8.5	16.2	
1946	29,000	708	248	460	24.4	8.6	15.9	
1947	30,000	742	242	500	24.7	8.1	16.7	
1948	30,000	821	227	595	27.4	7.6	19.8	
1949	31,000	876	256	626	28.3	8.3	20.2	
1950	31,000	856	282	585	27.6	9.1	18.9	
1951	31,000	857	229	628	27.6	7.4	20.3	
1952	32,000	809	240	569	25.3	7.5	17.8	
1953	33,000	758	228	530	23.0	6.9	16.1	
1954	33,000	757	248	509	22.9	7.5	15.4	
1955	32,000	749	221	528	23.4	6.9	16.5	
1956	33,000	767	239	528	23.2	7.2	16.0	
1957	33,000	746	268	478	22.6	8.1	14.5	
1958	34,000	845	226	619	24.9	6.6	18.2	
1959	34,000	856	242	614	25.2	7.1	18.1	
1960	34,000	764	274	490	22.5	8.1	14.4	
1961	35,000	781	206	575	22.3	5.9	16.4	
1962	36,000	800	234	566	22.2	6.5	15.7	
1963	36,000	848	242	606	23.6	6.7	16.8	
1964	36,000	857	253	604	23.8	7.0	16.8	
1965	37,000	889	261	628	24.0	7.1	17.0	
1966	37,000	969	262	707	26.2	7.1	19.1	
1967	38,000	956	289	667	25.2	7.6	17.6	
1968	38,000	878	262	616	23.1	6.9	16.2	
1969	38,300	843	269	574	22.0	7.0	15.0	
1970	38,700	814	287	527	21.0	7.4	13.6	3.42
1971	38,700	779	308	471	20.1	8.0	12.2	3.22
1972	38,900	798	267	531	20.5	6.9	13.7	3.26
1973	39,400	808	303	505	20.5	7.7	12.8	3.22
1974	40,100	798	303	495	19.9	7.6	12.3	3.07
1975	40,800	781	280	501	19.1	6.9	12.3	2.90
1976	41,300	756	291	465	18.3	7.0	11.3	2.74
1977	41,800	759	271	488	18.2	6.5	11.7	2.68
1978	42,400	742	303	439	17.5	7.1	10.4	2.60
1979	43,000	790	269	521	18.4	6.3	12.1	2.70
1980	43,400	741	309	432	17.1	7.1	10.0	2.46
1981	43,800	753	293	460	17.2	6.7	10.5	2.47
1982	44,200	726	316	410	16.4	7.1	9.3	2.35
1983	44,500	688	361	327	15.5	8.1	7.4	2.16
1984	45,000	695	350	345	15.4	7.8	7.6	2.17
1985	45,500	740	340	400	16.3	7.5	8.8	2.288
1986	46,000	791	370	421	17.2	8.1	9.1	2.410
1987	46,600	782	372	410	16.8	8.0	8.8	2.358
1988	47,300	870	424	446	18.4	9.0	9.4	2.572
1989	47,700	932	374	558	19.5	7.8	11.7	2.706
1990	47,600	947	359	588	19.9	7.5	12.4	2.796
1991	47,400	866	398	468	18.3	8.4	9.9	2.624
1992	47,100	809	400	409	17.2	8.5	8.7	2.521
1993	46,100	762	385	377	16.6	8.4	8.2	2.509
1994	44,500	667	354	313	15.0	8.0	7.0	2.392
1995	43,600	644	365	279	14.8	8.4	6.4	2.455
1996	43,600	675	395	280	15.5	9.1	6.4	2.586
1997	44,000	665	377	288	15.1	8.6	6.5	2.515
1998	44,500	625	377	248	14.0	8.5	5.5	2.336
1999	45,100	626	401	225	13.9	8.9	5.0	2.325
2000	46,022	692	354	338	15.1	7.7	7.4	2.586
2001	46,867	632	360	272	13.6	7.7	5.9	2.337
2002	47,558	709	392	317	15.0	8.3	6.7	2.557
2003	48,118	705	405	300	14.7	8.5	6.2	2.541
2004	48,301	713	380	333	14.8	7.9	6.9	2.594
2005	48,106	711	417	294	14.7	8.6	6.1	2.639
2006	48,269	662	417	245	13.7	8.7	5.0	2.504
2007	48,311	675	381	294	14.0	7.9	6.1	2.567
2008	48,637	667	383	284	13.8	7.9	5.9	2.581
2009	48,530	614	386	228	12.6	8.0	4.6	2.383
2010	48,489	642	349	293	13.2	7.2	6.0	2.515
2011	48,256	581	385	196	12.0	8.0	4.0	2.312
2012	48,030	619	408	211	12.9	8.5	4.4	2.571
2013	48,126	626	364	262	13.0	7.6	5.4	2.546
2014	48,591	639	394	245	13.2	8.1	5.1	2.577
2015	49,100	608	377	231	12.4	7.7	4.7	2.428
2016	49,796	675	379	296	13.6	7.7	5.9	2.639
2017	50,466	656	447	209	13.1	8.9	4.2	2.493
2018	51,279	684	394	290	13.4	7.7	5.7	2.512
2019	52,111	683	411	272	13.2	8.0	5.2	2.434
2020	52,925	678	366	312	12.9	7.0	5.9	2.350
2021	53,676	683	429	254	12.8	8.1	4.7	2.325
2022	54,200	631	487	144	11.6	9.0	2.6	2.071
2023	54,320	577	406	171	10.6	7.5	3.1	1.859
2024	54,533	586	447	139	10.7	8.2	2.5	1.913
2025	54,981	642	432	210	11.7	7.9	3.8	2.112

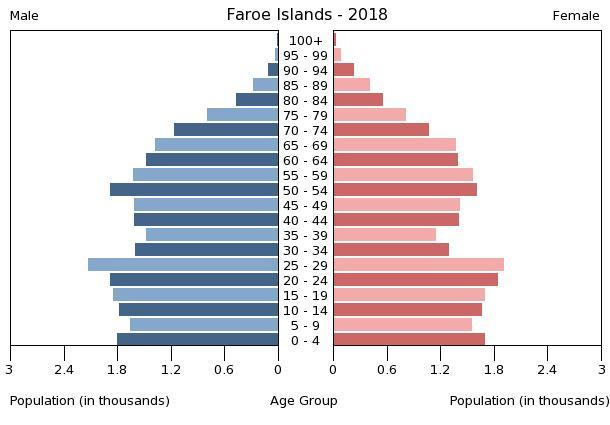

=== Current vital statistics ===
Period	Live births	Deaths	Natural increase
January-September 2025	477	326	+151
January-September 2026	481	357	+124
Difference	▲ +4 (+0.8%)	▲ +31 (+9.5%)	▼ –27

=== Structure of the population ===
Population Estimates by Sex and Age Group (01.VII.2021):

Age group	Male	Female	Total	%
Total	27 631	25 752	53 383	100
0–4	1 869	1 822	3 691	6.91
5–9	1 864	1 756	3 620	6.78
10–14	1 847	1 829	3 676	6.89
15–19	1 952	1 758	3 710	6.95
20–24	1 758	1 435	3 193	5.98
25–29	1 594	1 379	2 973	5.57
30–34	1 816	1 681	3 497	6.55
35–39	1 661	1 462	3 123	5.85
40–44	1 714	1 552	3 266	6.12
45–49	1 828	1 515	3 343	6.26
50–54	1 793	1 615	3 408	6.38
55–59	1 770	1 622	3 392	6.35
60–64	1 532	1 497	3 029	5.67
65–69	1 373	1 301	2 674	5.01
70–74	1 278	1 218	2 496	4.68
75–79	989	929	1 918	3.59
80–84	544	622	1 166	2.18
85–89	300	428	728	1.36
90–94	131	254	385	0.72
95–99	17	71	88	0.16
100+	1	6	7	0.01
Age group	Male	Female	Total	Percent
0–14	5 580	5 407	10 987	20.58
15–64	17 418	15 516	32 934	61.69
65+	4 633	4 829	9 462	17.72

View source data.

== CIA World Factbook demographic statistics ==
The following demographic statistics are from the CIA World Factbook, unless otherwise indicated.

=== Age structure ===
0–14 years: 19.89% (male 5,214/female 4,878)
15–24 years: 14.34% (male 3,738/female 3,538)
25–54 years: 37.31% (male 10,252/female 8,676)
55–64 years: 11.69% (male 3,054/female 2,878)
65 years and over: 16.76% (male 4,111/female 4,391) (2017 est.)

=== Sex ratio ===
at birth: 1.07 male(s)/female
0–14 years: 1.07 male(s)/female
15–24 years: 1.05 male(s)/female
25–54 years: 1.18 male(s)/female
55–64 years: 1.06 male(s)/female
65 years and over: 0.94 male(s)/female
total population: 1.08 male(s)/female (2017 est.)

=== Infant mortality rate ===
5.4 deaths/1,000 live births (2017 est.)

=== Life expectancy at birth ===
total population: 79.85 years (2012 est.)
male: 77.37 years
female: 82.50 years

=== Total fertility rate ===
2.4 children born/woman (2012 est.)

=== Nationality ===
noun: Faroese (singular and plural)
adjective: Faroese

=== Ethnic groups ===
– Faroese

– Danes

=== Religions ===
- Protestant Christianity, 97.54% in 2020

=== Literacy ===
definition: NA
total population: NA%
male: NA%
female: NA%
note: similar to Denmark proper

== Languages ==
The official languages are Faroese (derived from Old Norse, closely related to Icelandic), and Danish.

According to the Faroese census of 2011, here is the breakdown of people in the Faroe Islands by language:

Languages	#	%
Faroese	45,361	93.83
Danish	1,546	3.20
Other Nordic Languages	411	0.85
Other European Languages	607	1.26
Asian languages	290	0.60
Middle East/North African Languages	40	0.08
Other African languages	31	0.06
Sign Language	18	0.04
South American languages	< 3	–
No languages	41	0.08
Total	48,346	

The percentages have been calculated based on the total number of respondents, which was 48,346 residents of the Faroe Islands who were asked to reply to the questions in November 2011.

== Ethnic groups ==
Population by Place of Birth, 2011 Census
Place of birth	#	%
Faroe Islands	43,135	89.22
Denmark Proper	3,431	7.10
Greenland	166	0.34
Elsewhere in Nordic	473	0.98
Elsewhere in EU	312	0.65
Elsewhere in Europe	163	0.34
Others	666	1.38
Total	48,346	

== Population by island ==
Name	Area	Inhabitants	People per km^{2}	Main places	Regions
Streymoy	373.5	21,717	57.4	Tórshavn and Vestmanna	Tórshavn and rest of Streymoy
Eysturoy	286.3	10,738	37.5	Fuglafjørður and Runavík	North Eysturoy and South Eysturoy
Vágar	177.6	2,856	15.7	Míðvágur and Sørvágur	Vágar
Suðuroy	166	5,074	30.9	Tvøroyri and Vágur	Suðuroy
Sandoy	112.1	1,428	12.4	Sandur and Skopun	Sandoy
Borðoy	95	5,030	52.4	Klaksvík	Klaksvík and rest of northern Faroes (Norðoyar)
Viðoy	41	605	15	Viðareiði	Norðoyar
Kunoy	35.5	135	3.8	Kunoy	Norðoyar
Kalsoy	30.9	136	4.8	Mikladalur and Húsar	Norðoyar
Svínoy	27.4	58	2.7	Svínoy	Norðoyar
Fugloy	11.2	46	4	Kirkja	Norðoyar
Nólsoy	10.3	262	26.1	Nólsoy	Streymoy
Mykines	10.3	19	1.8	Mykines	Vágar
Skúvoy	10	61	5.7	Skúvoy	Sandoy
Hestur	6.1	40	7.1	Hestur	Streymoy
Stóra Dímun	2.7	7	1.9	Dímun	Sandoy
Koltur	2.5	2	0.8	Koltur	Streymoy
Lítla Dímun	0.8	0	0	–	Suðuroy

== See also ==
- List of Faroese people
