= Municipalities of the Faroe Islands =

The Faroe Islands are administratively divided in 29 municipalities (kommunur), with about 120 cities and villages. Until December 31, 2008, there were 34 municipalities, and until December 31, 2004, there were 48 municipalities. In the coming years the number of Faroese municipalities is expected to drop to somewhere between 7 and 15, as there is currently a rationale towards municipal amalgamation and a decentralization of public services. In 1998 it was suggested that no municipality should have fewer than 2,000 inhabitants, but whether this will be true is a political question. The Faroese government has furthermore decided not to conduct forced, top-down amalgamation, but to leave the process to the free will of the municipalities. In many small municipalities there is some resistance to the amalgamation process, and as a result two kinds of municipalities are being created: large municipalities (town-municipalities) that are eager to attract smaller municipalities into amalgamation, and small municipalities which are either trying to avoid amalgamation or seek to amalgamate with other small municipalities. The geographically large Sunda municipality is an example of this. The larger municipalities are organized in Kommunusamskipan Føroya (KFS) and the smaller are organized in Føroya Kommunufelag (FKF).

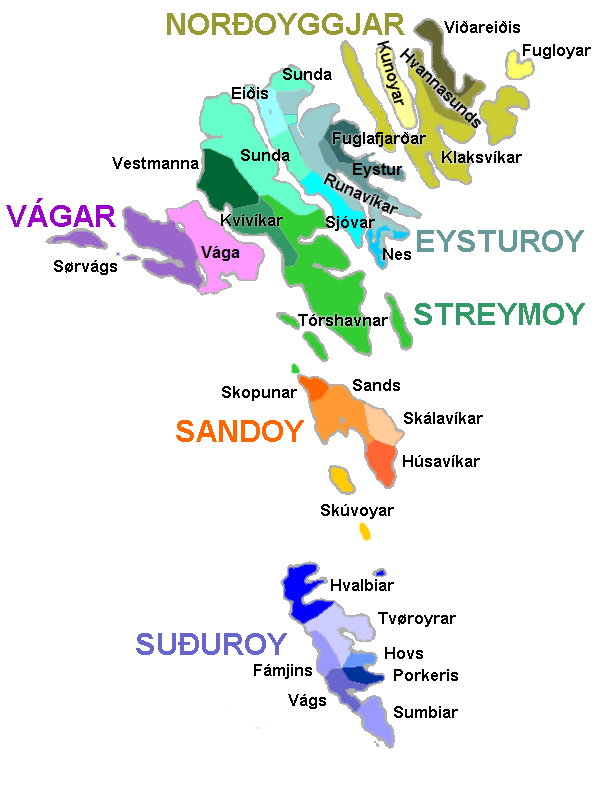
Municipalities of the Faroe Islands since 2017

== List of municipalities ==
As of June 1, 2019, there were 29 municipalities in the Faroe Islands.

Name of Municipality	Population (January 2024)	Inhabitants per km^{2}	Area (in km^{2})	Markatal	Island(s)	Region
Tórshavn	23,242	134	173	327	Streymoy, Nólsoy, Hestur, Koltur	Tórshavn
Klaksvík	5,478	47	116.4		Borðoy, Svínoy, Kalsoy	Klaksvík
Runavík	4,379	44	99.9		Eysturoy	Southern Eysturoy
Eystur	2,296	55	42		Eysturoy	Southern Eysturoy
Vágar	2,198	21	102.8		Vágar	Vágar
Sunda	1,828	12	158	152	Eysturoy, Streymoy	Northern Eysturoy; Northern Streymoy
Tvøroyri	1,750	41	43	60	Suðuroy	Suðuroy
Fuglafjørður	1,633	71	23	32	Eysturoy	Northern Eysturoy
Nes	1,536	110	14	40	Eysturoy	Southern Eysturoy
Vágur	1,366	65	21	61	Suðuroy	Suðuroy
Vestmanna	1,270	24	52	56	Streymoy	Streymoy
Sørvágur	1,232	15	84	124	Vágar, Mykines	Vágar
Sjóvar	1,206	37	33	70	Eysturoy	Southern Eysturoy
Eiði	806	22	37	49	Eysturoy	Northern Eysturoy
Hvalba	640	16	40	99	Suðuroy, Lítla Dímun	Suðuroy
Kvívík	599	12	49	75	Streymoy	Streymoy
Sandur	529	11	48	97	Sandoy	Sandoy
Skopun	472	52	9	0	Sandoy	Sandoy
Hvannasund	426	13	33	38	Viðoy and Borðoy	Klaksvík
Viðareiði	344	12	30	48	Viðoy	Norðoyggjar
Sumba	335	13	25	64	Suðuroy	Suðuroy
Porkeri	322	23	14	37	Suðuroy	Suðuroy
Kunoy	154	4	35.5	65	Kunoy	Norðoyggjar
Skálavík	142	5	29	24	Sandoy	Sandoy
Hov	106	11	10	24	Suðuroy	Suðuroy
Húsavík	102	4	26	66	Sandoy	Sandoy
Fámjin	80	6	13	24	Suðuroy	Suðuroy
Fugloy	42	4	11.2	14	Fugloy	Norðoyggjar
Skúvoy	32	3	10	73	Skúvoy, Stóra Dímun	Sandoy

== History ==
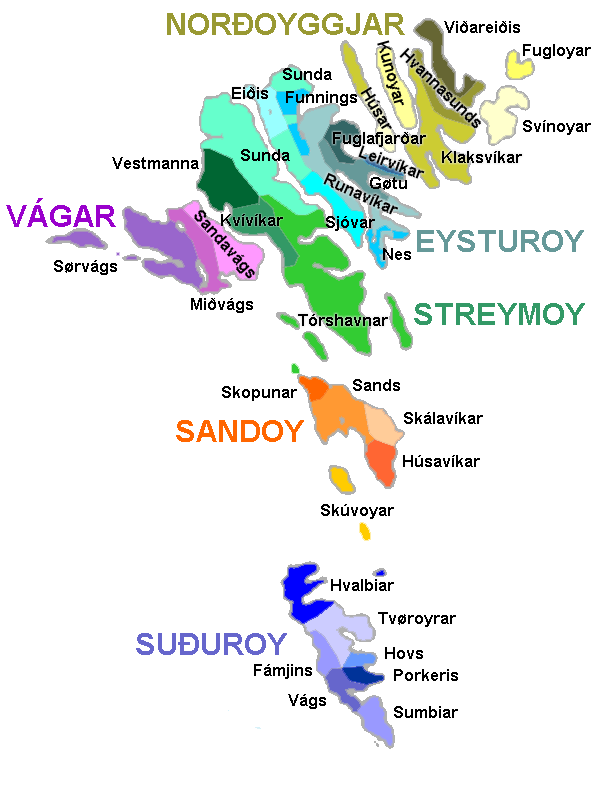
Municipalities from 1 January 2005 until 31 December 2008

- On 1 January 2017 (30 municipalities reduced to 29):
  - Húsar fused with Klaksvík
- On 1 January 2009 (34 municipalities reduced to 30):
  - Funningur fused with Runavík.
  - Gøta and Leirvík fused into Eystur.
  - Miðvágur and Sandavágur fused into Vágar.
  - Svínoy fused with Klaksvík.
- On 1 January 2005 (38 municipalities reduced to 34):
  - Elduvík, Oyndarfjørður and Skála fused with Runavík.
  - Gjógv, Haldarsvík, Hósvík, Hvalvík and Saksun fused with Sunda municipality.
  - Hestur, Kirkjubøur and Nólsoy fused with Tórshavn.
  - Mikladalur fused with Klaksvík.
  - Mykines fused with Sørvágur.
- On 1 January 1997
  - Argir and Kaldbak fused with Tórshavn.
- On 1 August 1948
  - Funningur split into Funningur and Gjógv.

== See also ==
- List of towns in the Faroe Islands
- Regions of the Faroe Islands
- List of islands of the Faroe Islands
- Subdivisions of Norden
- Politics of the Faroe Islands

== Notes ==
Hagstova Føroya - information from 2007.
Tórshavn is both the capital of the Streymoy region and its own region, the latter being identical with Tórshavn municipality, but not including the area of the former Kollafjarðar kommuna.
Klaksvík both capital of the Norðoyggjar region as well of its own region, which constitute of the two municipalities Klaksvík and Hvannasund.
