= Regions of the Faroe Islands =

Administrative subdivisions of the Faroe Islands

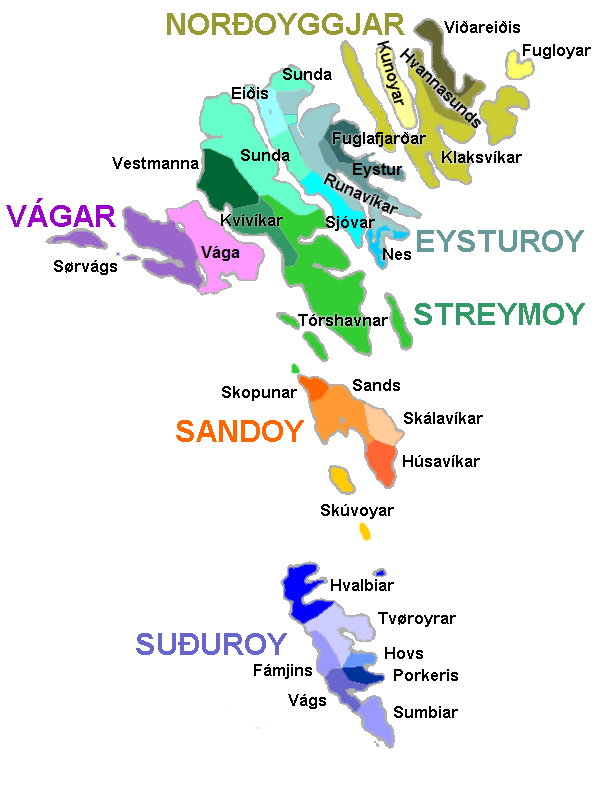
Sýslur and municipalities of the Faroes.

The Faroe Islands are divided into 29 municipalities, six regions/shires (sýsla, sýslur in plural) and since 2007 there has been only one constituency, earlier there were seven constituencies. Each region has one sheriff (sýslumaður).

- Eysturoyar sýsla – Eysturoy region.
- Norðoya sýsla - Norðoyar ("Northern Isles") region. (KG) Borðoy, Fugloy, Kalsoy, Kunoy, Svínoy, Viðoy.
- Sandoyar sýsla – Sandoy region (SA), Sandoy, Skúvoy, Stóra Dímun.
- Streymoyar sýsla – Streymoy region (TN). Streymoy, Hestur, Koltur, Nólsoy.
- Suðuroyar sýsla – Suðuroy region. Lítla Dímun, Suðuroy (TG).
- Vága sýsla – Vágar region. Mykines, Vágar (VA).

The administrative subdivisions of the Faroe Islands are frequently changing. In the 1980s there were more than 50 municipalities. During the last past decades the number has been decreasing steadily, and more municipal-mergers can be expected within the following years. The aim of the ministry of interior is that in 2015 there will be only seven or nine municipalities in the Faroe Islands, more or less following the boundaries of the districts and constituencies. If this happens the Faroe Islands will have left the administrative structure of parish municipalities, which was built up in the first half of the 20th century and entered a structure of regional municipalities.

Furthermore, there was a long-running discussion on reducing or even removing the constituencies. In the end, from the 2008 election onwards, the constituencies were abolished.

The regions (sýslur) are not administrative parts of the islands like the municipalities (kommunur). Municipalities charge taxes from inhabitants, while regions cannot charge taxes. Regions are mostly used by the public churches for the registration of births, deaths, marriages, divorces, christenings, etc., but the central administration which gathers this information from the priest and the municipalities is located in Tórshavn. It is called Landsfólkayvirlitið and is now a part of the Environmental Agency (Umhvørvisstovan).

The regions are also relevant to pilot whale hunts. The sheriff decides if a pod of pilot whales can be killed or not. The boats need to get the sheriff's permission before any slaughter can take place, and in some regions the sheriff also decides which villages the whale meat and blubber should be given to. This is the case in Suðuroy: if people from the southern part of the island participate in a whale hunt, they are not sure to get any meat at all if the sheriff decides that there are too few whales to divide it among the whole island. The sheriff can decide to give the meat only, for example, to the northern part or to specific villages or to homes for the elderly.

== See also ==
- Municipalities of the Faroe Islands
- List of islands of the Faroe Islands
- Subdivisions of the Nordic countries
- Politics of the Faroe Islands
