= List of islands of the Faroe Islands =

Islands of the Faroe Islands
Native name: Føroyar
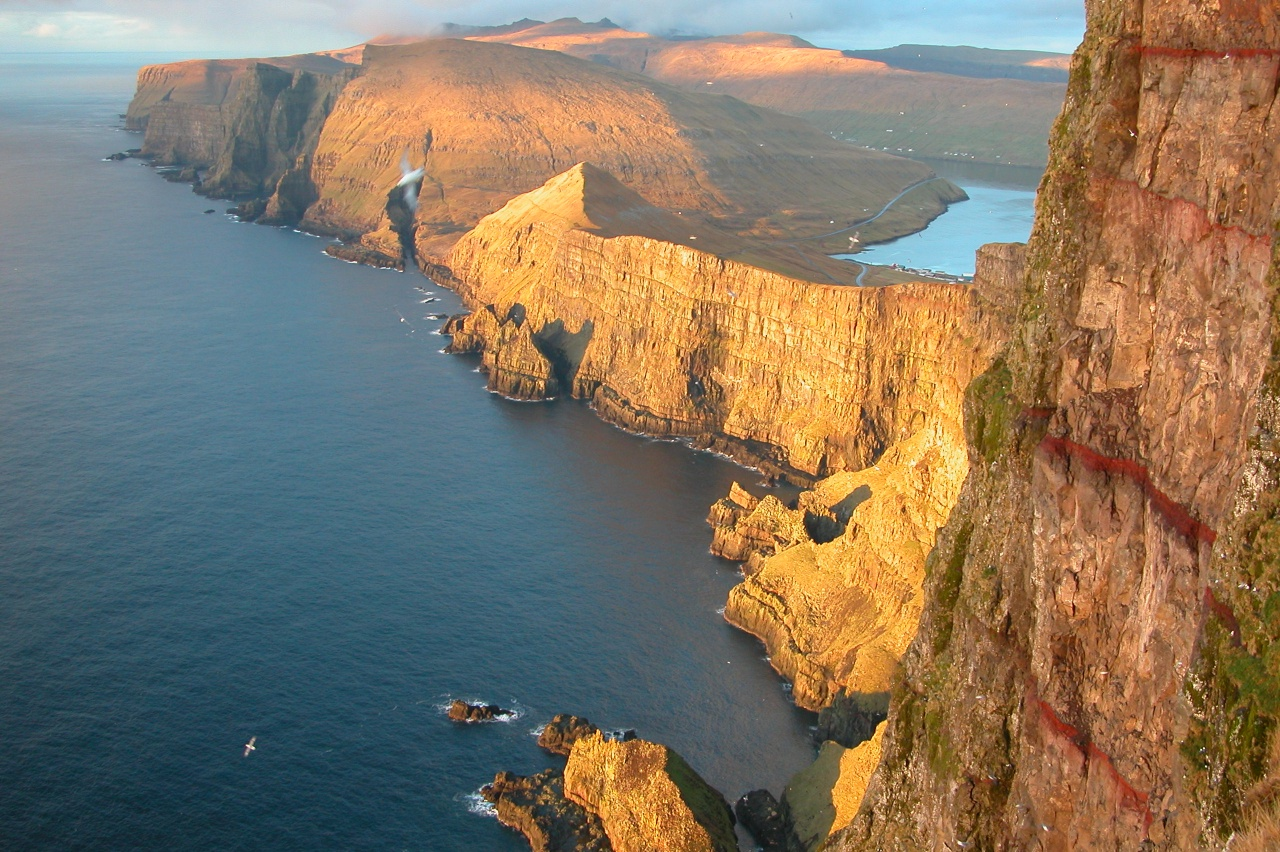
- Beinisvørð, Suðuroy

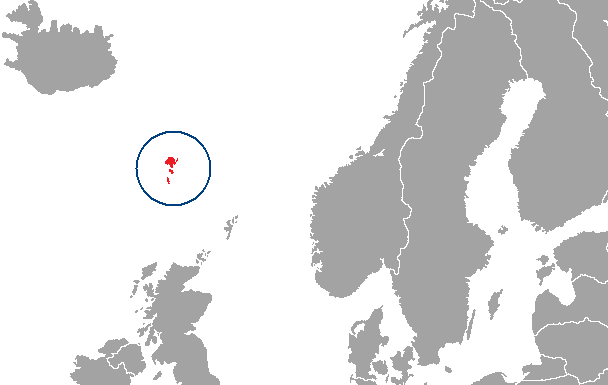

Geography
- Location: Norwegian Sea, Atlantic Ocean
- Coordinates: 62°00′N 06°47′W
- Archipelago: Faroe Islands
- Total islands: 18
- Major islands: Streymoy, Eysturoy, Vágar, Suðuroy
- Area: 1,399 km^{2} (540 sq mi)
- Highest elevation: 882 m (2894 ft)
- Highest point: Slættaratindur

Administration
- Faroe Islands
- Largest settlement: Tórshavn (pop. 12,393)

Demographics
- Population: 50,235 (7-2017)
- Ethnic groups: Faroese, Danish

This is a list of islands of the Faroe Islands. There are 18 islands, of which Lítla Dímun is the only one uninhabited. Besides these 18 islands there are also several islets and skerries in the Faroes.

| Name | Area [km^{2}] | Population (12-2018) | Population density [inhabitants/km^{2}] | Main settlements | Sýsla (District) |
|---|---|---|---|---|---|
| Streymoy | 373.5 | 24,276 | 65.0 | Tórshavn and Vestmanna | Streymoy |
| Eysturoy | 286.3 | 11,490 | 40.1 | Fuglafjørður and Runavík | Eysturoy |
| Vágar | 177.6 | 3,271 | 18.4 | Míðvágur and Sørvágur | Vágar |
| Suðuroy | 166.0 | 4,588 | 27.6 | Tvøroyri and Vágur | Suðuroy |
| Sandoy | 112.1 | 1,231 | 11.0 | Sandur | Sandoy |
| Borðoy | 95.0 | 5,261 | 55.4 | Klaksvík | Norðoyar |
| Viðoy | 41.0 | 605 | 14.8 | Viðareiði | Norðoyar |
| Kunoy | 35.5 | 146 | 4.1 | Kunoy | Norðoyar |
| Kalsoy | 30.9 | 76 | 2.5 | Mikladalur and Húsar | Norðoyar |
| Svínoy | 27.4 | 26 | 0.9 | Svínoy | Norðoyar |
| Fugloy | 11.0 | 37 | 3.4 | Kirkja | Norðoyar |
| Nólsoy | 10.3 | 227 | 22.0 | Nólsoy | Streymoy |
| Mykines | 10.3 | 14 | 1.4 | Mykines | Vágar |
| Skúvoy | 10.0 | 33 | 3.3 | Skúvoy | Sandoy |
| Hestur | 6.1 | 20 | 3.3 | Hestur | Streymoy |
| Stóra Dímun | 2.7 | 10 | 3.7 | Dímun | Sandoy |
| Koltur | 2.5 | 1 | 0.4 | Koltur | Streymoy |
| Lítla Dímun | 0.8 | 0 | 0 | – | Suðuroy |
| Total | 1,396 | 51,312 | Ø 36.8 | | |

== See also ==
- Geography of the Faroe Islands
- Subdivisions of the Faroe Islands
