= Per á Hædd =

Faroese photographer

Per á Hædd is a Faroese photographer based in Tórshavn whose photographs were featured on stamps issued in 1999:

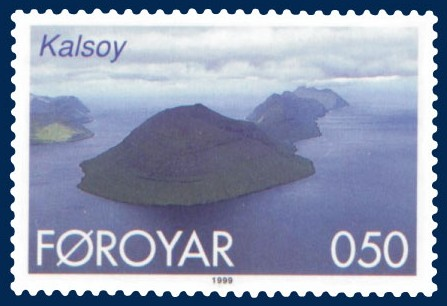
Kalsoy

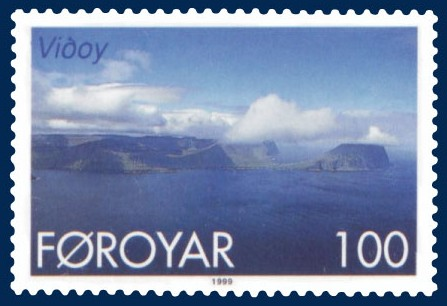
Viðoy

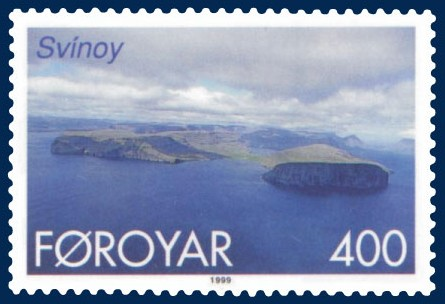
Svínoy

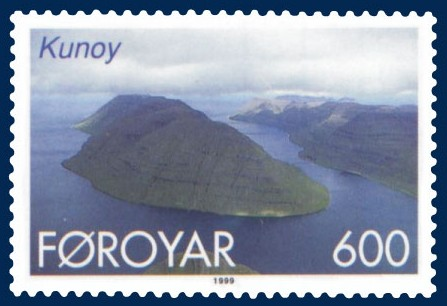
Kunoy

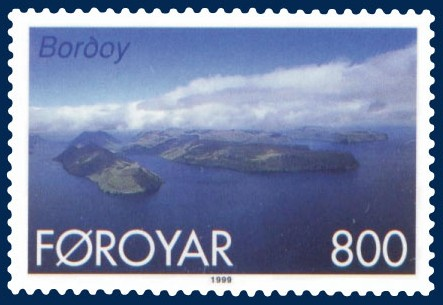
Borðoy

and later on stamps issued in the year 2000:

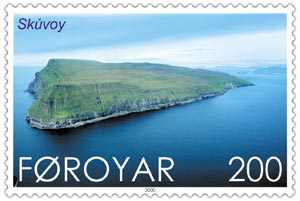
Skúvoy

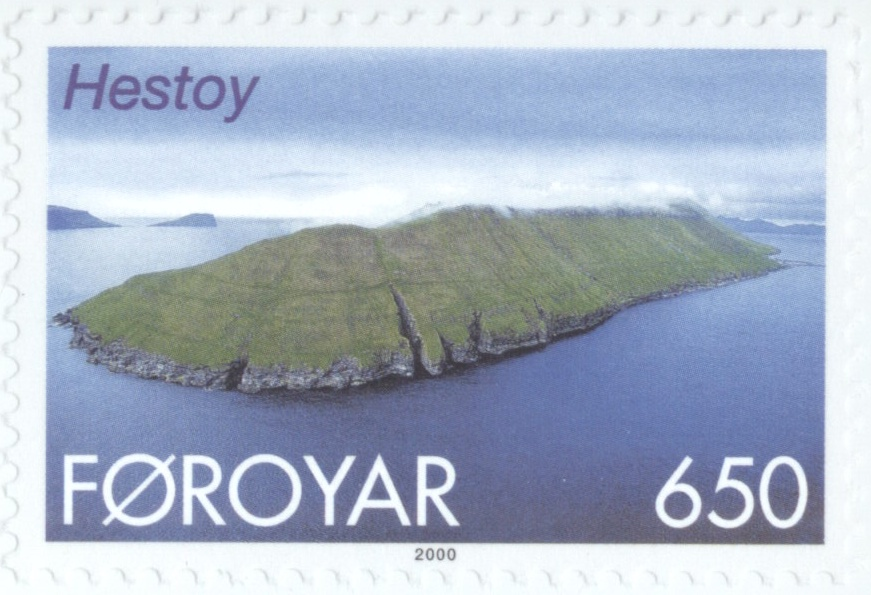
Hestur

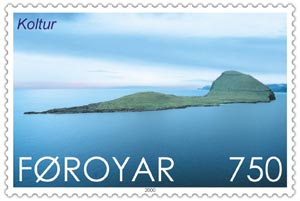
Koltur

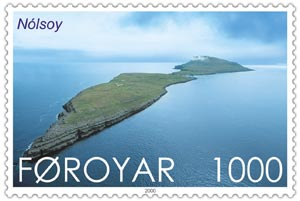
Nólsoy
