= Norðoyri =

- Village
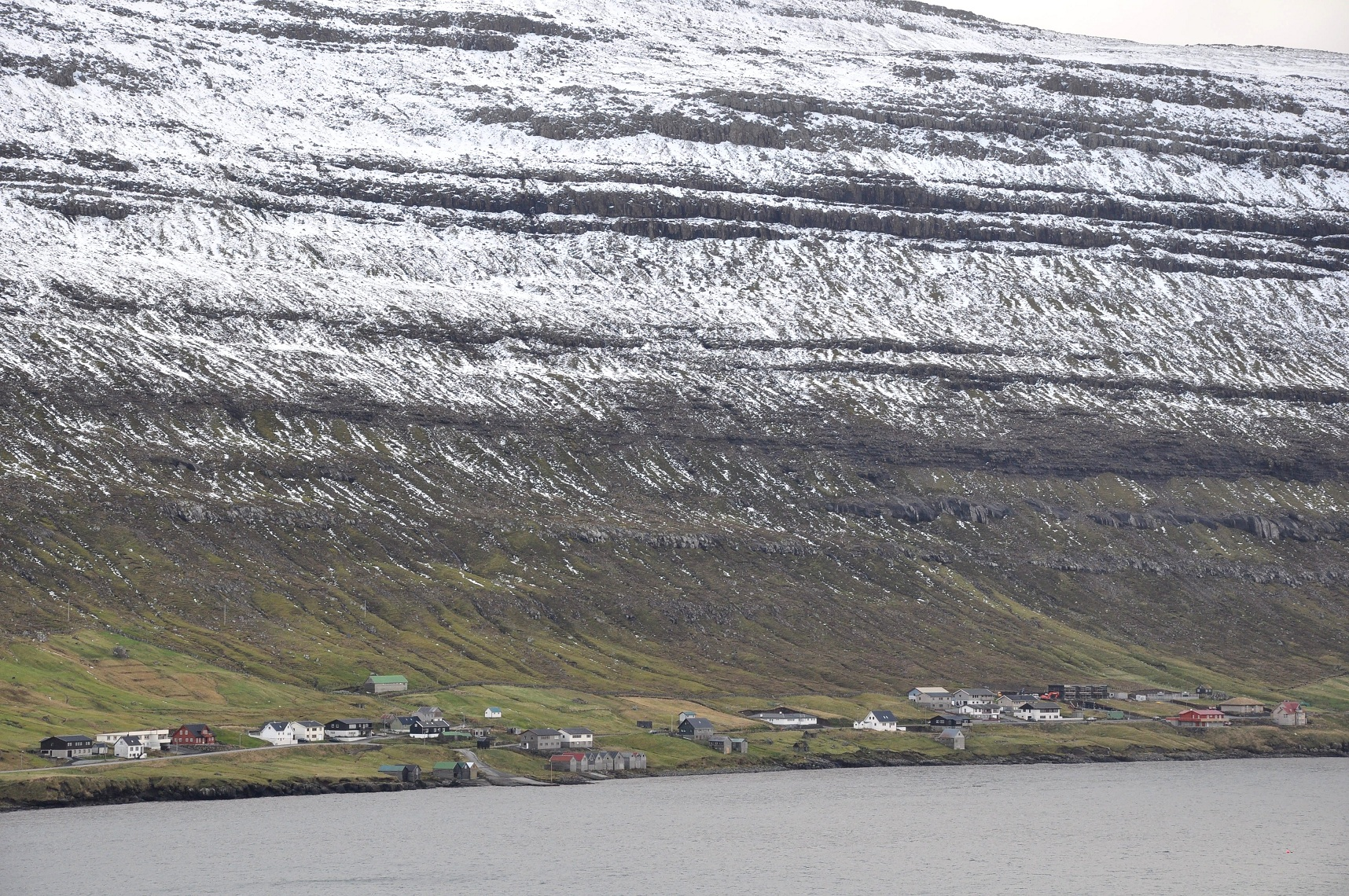
- Norðoyri

- Location in the Faroe Islands
- Coordinates: 62°12′42″N 6°32′35″W
- State: Kingdom of Denmark
- Constituent country: Faroe Islands
- Island: Borðoy
- Municipality: Klaksvík

Population (September 2025)
  - Total: 149
- Time zone: GMT
  - Summer (DST): UTC+1 (EST)
- Postal code: FO 725
- Climate: ET

Norðoyri (Danish: Nordøre) is a village in the Faroe Islands on the northern island of Borðoy. It belongs to the municipality of Klaksvík.

== Geography ==
Norðoyri has an elongated settlement character and is sited along the eastern shore of the fjord Borðoyarvík that opens up in a SE direction. The lengthy 'infield' lines the shore. The 'outfield' covers the SE half of the peninsula between Borðoyarvík and Árnafjørður. It descends rather steeply from the central mountain-ridge, 400 to 563 m high, and specially in the SE part there are steep slopes and this outfield is generally regarded as difficult to tend and dangerous, as many sheep are lost there in severe winters.

== History ==
Norðoyri is first mentioned in writing in 1584, but excavations at Islendingatoftir, a few miles south of Norðoyri have demonstrated that this place was already inhabited during the Viking Age.

=== The Matras Diaries ===
In 1813 Samuel Michael Matras, sheriff for the northern islands and Royal tenant of the Uppistova farm in Norðoyri, started to register various data related to the operation of the farm in a journal, such as sheep taken in the outfield, haymaking, grain and potato growing. When Samuel died in 1857, his son Albert Josias Michael (1815–89) took over and continued the journals until his death. Finally, his son Samuel Michael continued the diaries for three more years until 1892. These journals (the Matrasdagbøkur) have been preserved and give an unprecedented insight in faroese farming during a large part of the 19th century (1813–1892). The diaries show that a new crop, potatoes, first planted in Norðoyri in 1823, gradually displaced grain and had almost taken over by 1855. This happened because of potatoes' weather resistance, stability and more flexible harvesting period compared to grain. Furthermore, the journals contain information or proxy data that admits statements on climatic variation. When e.g. transforming the data on potatoes and barley yields into 10 years moving averages, both crops show similar chronological yield variations, with good harvests in the early 1830s, early 1860s and mid-1880s, separated by poorer periods with minima around 1825, 1844 and the 1870s. The analysis of the journals also shows that haymaking for winter fodder for cows was relatively stable.

The Matras family still owns real estate in Norðoyri, e.g. on Fornavegur 53, Flatnavegur 59, Túnið 3 and one of the 14 boat sheds.

== Population ==
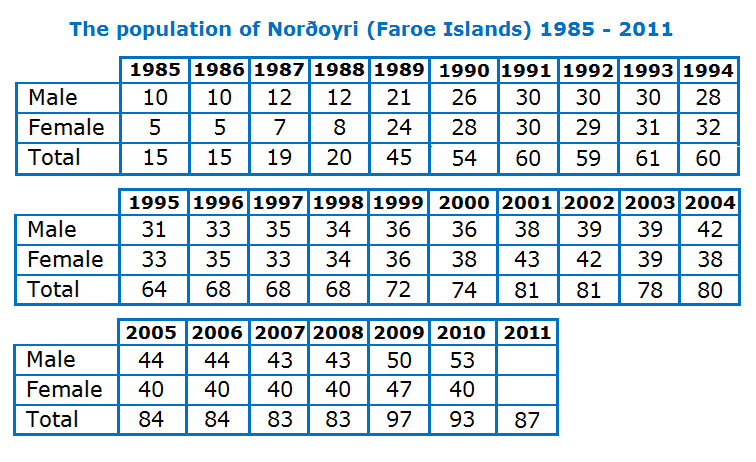
The population has grown steeply in the last 25 years, undoubtedly caused by its proximity to Klaksvík. In 1985/86 only 15 people lived in Norðoyri. Then, between 1988 and 1991 the population suddenly tripled from 20 to 60, growing slowly to a level fluctuating around 90 in the last 5 years. In 2010 there were 93 inhabitants, of which 25 children under 16 and 7 elderly people over 65. As of 1 Jan. 2011 the counter stood at 87; see under here for a complete table.

== Transportation ==
Norðoyri's old harbour has 14 traditional Faeroese boat sheds. The road into the village is called Oyrarvegur, which changes its name to Fornavegur, and finally runs dead as the Flatnavegur. There are two small side roads: the Fjøruvegur to the old harbour, and Túnið. Norðoyri's postal code is FO-725. The village has no church.

== See also ==
- Personal Danish site with photographs of Norðoyri
- List of towns in the Faroe Islands
