= Klaksvík Municipality =

Klaksvík Municipality Klaksvíkar kommuna (Faroese)
- Logo

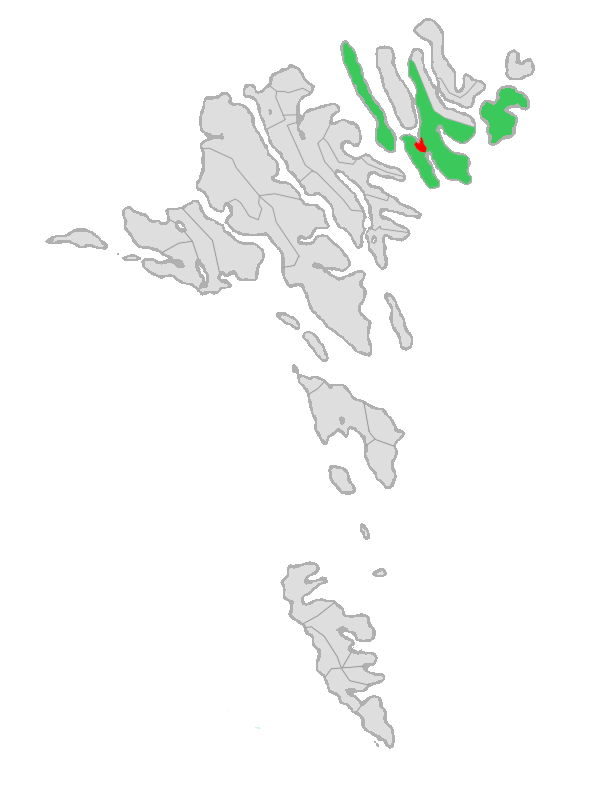
- Coordinates: 62.223889°N 6.578611°W
- State: Kingdom of Denmark
- Constituent country: Faroe Islands
- Islands: Borðoy; Kalsoy; Svínoy

Area
  - Total: 116.4 km^{2} (44.9 sq mi)

Population (January 2024)
  - Total: 5,478
  - Density: 47.06/km^{2} (121.9/sq mi)
- Website: www.klaksvik.fo

Klaksvík Municipality (Faroese: Klaksvíkar kommuna) is a municipality of the Faroe Islands. The town of Klaksvík is the administrative centre.

Its area comprises the majority of the islands of Borðoy, Kalsoy and Svínoy (added 1 January 2009).

It contains the following towns and villages:

On Borðoy:

- Klaksvík
- Árnafjørður
- Ánir
- Norðoyri
- Skálatoftir (abandoned)
- Strond (abandoned)

On Kalsoy:

- Húsar
- Mikladalur
- Syðradalur
- Trøllanes

On Svínoy:

- Svínoy

== Politics ==
=== Municipal council ===
Klaksvík's municipal council consists of 11 members, elected every four years.

Election	Party					Total seats	Turnout	Elected mayor
Election	A	B	C	D	E	Total seats	Turnout	Elected mayor
2016	3		2	4	1	11	87.5%	Jógvan Skorheim (D)
2020	5	1	2	2	1	11	86.3%	Jógvan Skorheim (D)
Data from Kvf.fo
