= Kommunusamskipan Føroya =

Kommunusamskipan Føroya (The Faroese Municipal Organization) is the organization of the greater municipalities of the Faroe Islands. The members are Tórshavn, Klaksvík, Runavík, Tvøroyri, Fuglafjørður, Vágur and Sandur.

Kommunusamskipan Føroya (KSF) is a key organization in the Faroe Islands that plays an important role in local government affairs. It serves as the national association of municipalities, and its primary purpose is to coordinate and represent the interests of Faroese local governments in various matters. Through its work, KSF facilitates communication and cooperation between the municipalities, the Faroese government, and other relevant stakeholders.

== Overview ==
KSF was founded in 1981 and is a significant entity in the governance of the Faroe Islands. It aims to strengthen the role and influence of local governments in the country and ensure their voices are heard in national discussions on public policy, administration, and legislation. The organization works to promote collaboration among municipalities, improve local government services, and ensure sustainable development throughout the archipelago.

== Activities ==
Some of the main activities of Kommunusamskipan Føroya include:

- Advocacy: Representing the interests of municipalities in discussions with the Faroese government, advocating for policies and legislative changes that benefit local governance.
- Coordination: Facilitating communication and cooperation between the different municipalities in the Faroe Islands, fostering collaboration on shared issues and projects.
- Support Services: Offering advice, training, and various support services to local governments to help improve administrative practices, service delivery, and community engagement.
- Research and Development: Conducting research on local governance issues, providing data and analysis to inform policy decisions and improve local government operations.
- Networking: Creating platforms for municipal leaders and staff to share experiences, discuss challenges, and develop solutions together.

== Structure ==
KSF is composed of all the municipalities in the Faroe Islands, each of which is a member. The organization is governed by a board that represents the different regions of the islands. The executive director and staff members manage the day-to-day operations of the organization.

== Importance ==
The work of Kommunusamskipan Føroya is critical in shaping the development of the Faroe Islands' local government landscape. By supporting municipalities and acting as an intermediary between local and national authorities, KSF helps ensure that the needs and perspectives of local communities are considered in national policy-making. The organization plays a crucial role in promoting local democracy and enhancing the quality of life for the residents of the Faroe Islands.
