= Svínoy, Svínoy =

Svínoy
- Village
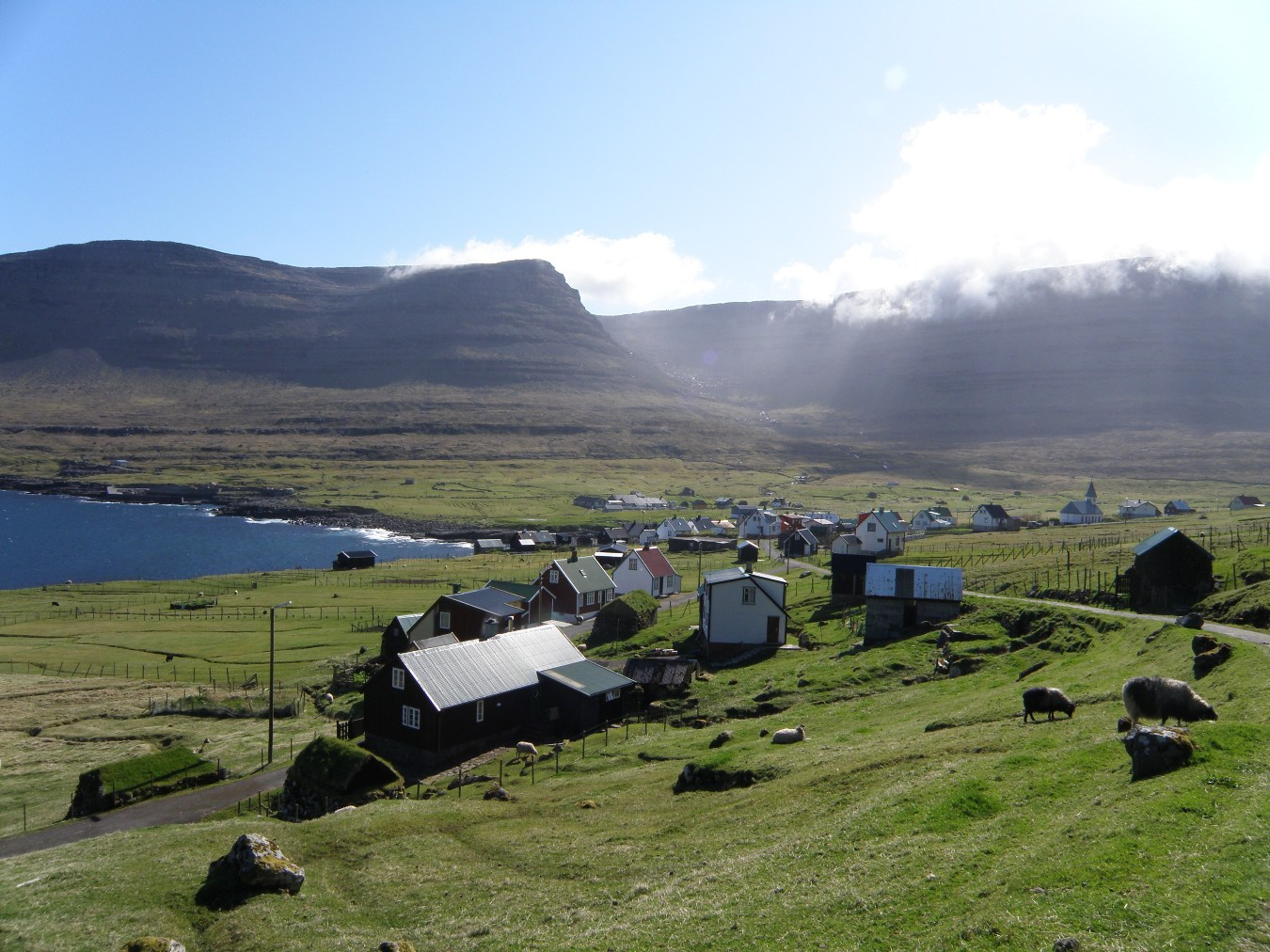
- Svínoy village on the east coast

- Location in the Faroe Islands
- Coordinates: 62°16′47″N 6°20′55″W
- State: Kingdom of Denmark
- Constituent Country: Faroe Islands
- Island: Svínoy
- Municipality: Klaksvík Municipality

Population (1 January 2006)
  - Total: 55
- Time zone: GMT
  - Summer (DST): UTC+1 (EST)
- Postal code: FO 765
- Climate: Cfc

Svínoy (Danish: Svinø) is the only village on the northern Faroese island of the same name in Klaksvík Municipality. Until 1 January 2009 it was the only village in the now abolished Svínoy Municipality.

The 2015 population was 27. Its postal code is FO 765. Its current church was built in 1878. The name of the island Svínoy means 'Island of Pigs [Swine]'.

== See also ==
- List of towns in the Faroe Islands
