= Koltur, Koltur =

Settlement in Faroe Islands, Kingdom of Denmark

Koltur
- Village
- Location in the Faroe Islands
- Coordinates: 61°59′26″N 6°58′48″W
- State: Kingdom of Denmark
- Constituent country: Faroe Islands
- Island: Koltur

Population (30 April 2025)
  - Total: 0
- Time zone: GMT
  - Summer (DST): UTC+1 (EST)
- Postal code: FO 285
- Climate: Cfc

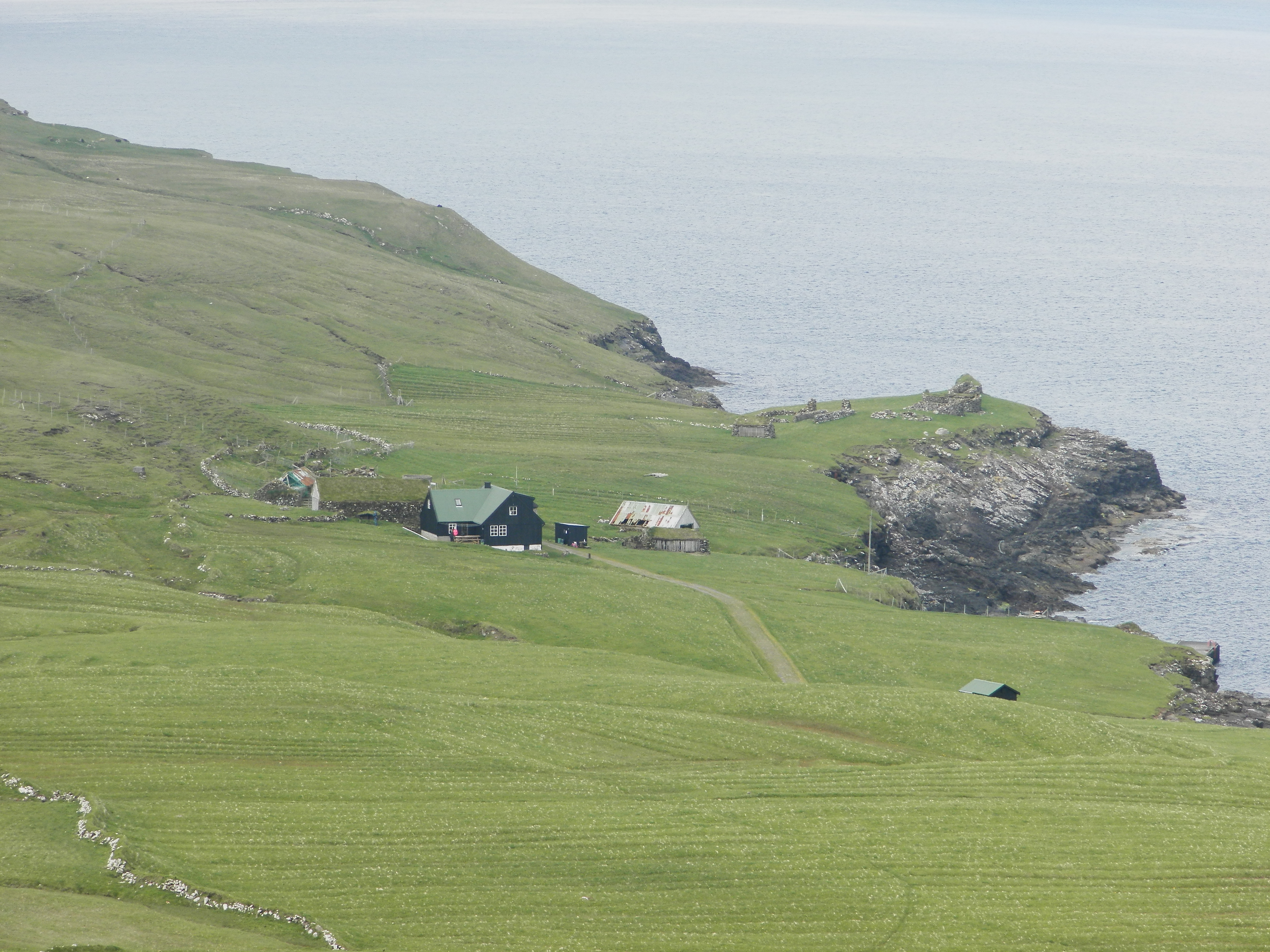
Koltur is one of the smallest islands of the Faroe Islands.

Koltur (Danish: Kolter) is a settlement on the island of Koltur, Faroe Islands. It has a population of 0 as of 30th of April 2025, but this is due to the village having non permanent residences, because of its small size.
