= Húsar =

Húsar Husum
- Village
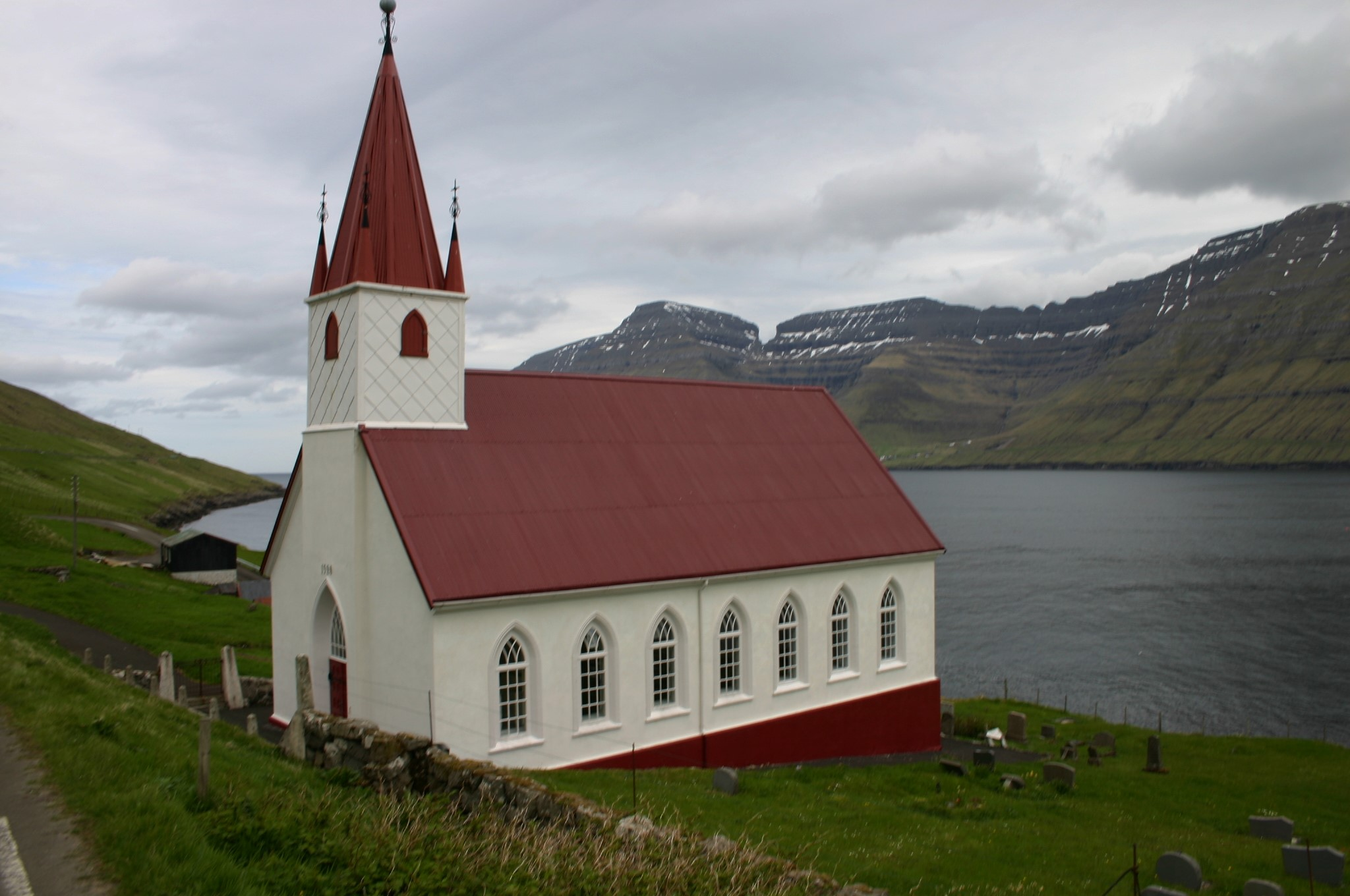
- Húsar Church

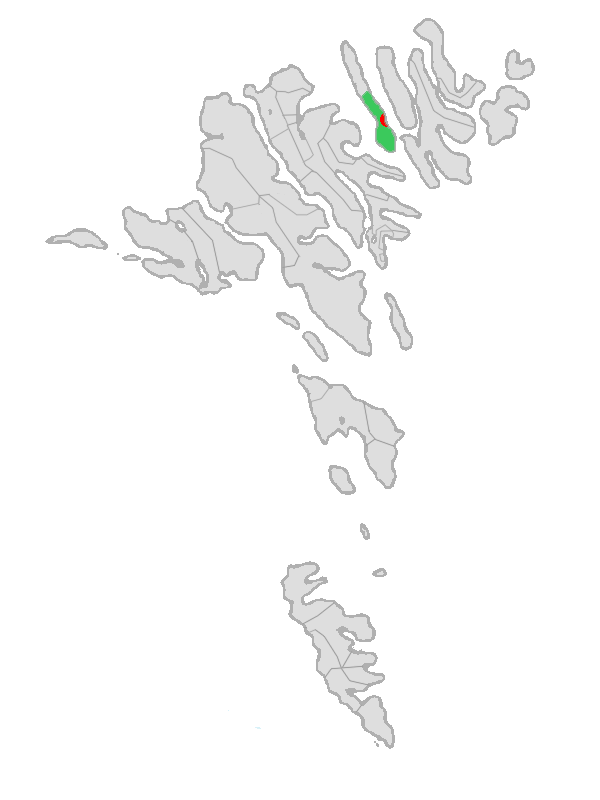
- Location of the former Húsar Municipality in the Faroe Islands

- Location of Húsar village in the Faroe Islands
- Coordinates: 62°15′54″N 6°40′53″W
- State: Kingdom of Denmark
- Constituent country: Faroe Islands
- Island: Kalsoy
- Municipality: Klaksvík Municipality

Population (September 2025)
  - Total: 42
- Time zone: GMT
  - Summer (DST): UTC+1 (WEST)
- Postal code: FO 796
- Climate: Cfc

Húsar (Danish: Husum) is a village on the island of Kalsoy in the Faroe Islands.

== History ==
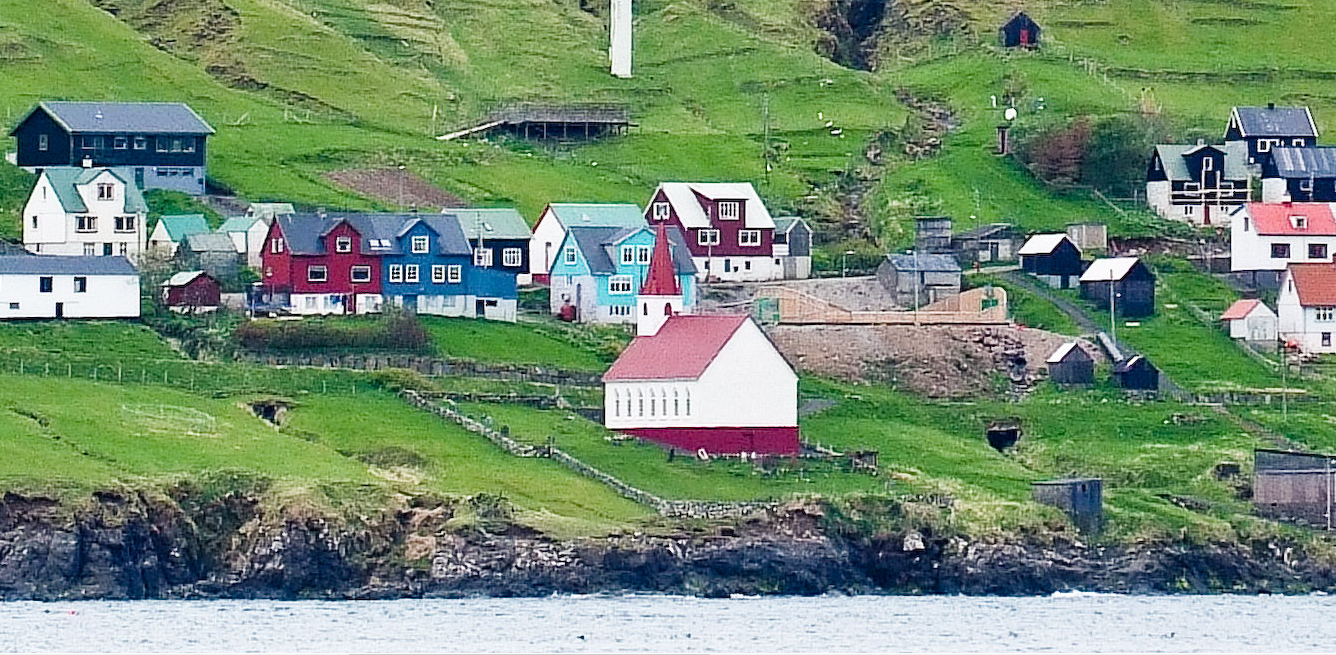
Húsar

Húsar is located on the east coast and the southern part of the island of Kalsoy. Húsar is connected to Klaksvík by a ferry that visits the village three times a day. From Húsar the other villages on the island can be reached by bus.

Húsar is the oldest of the villages on Kalsoy. Húsar church, which is made of stone, was built in 1920. On 1 January 2017, the municipality of Húsar was fused into Klaksvík municipality.

The majority of the former municipality's employees are affiliated with the primary industries; fisheries and livestock. Húsar is involved in fish farming, particularly the production of fry and fingerling. The fry are grown for 1½ to 2 years. After that it is placed in sea farms where it will grow into adult fish.

== Gallery ==
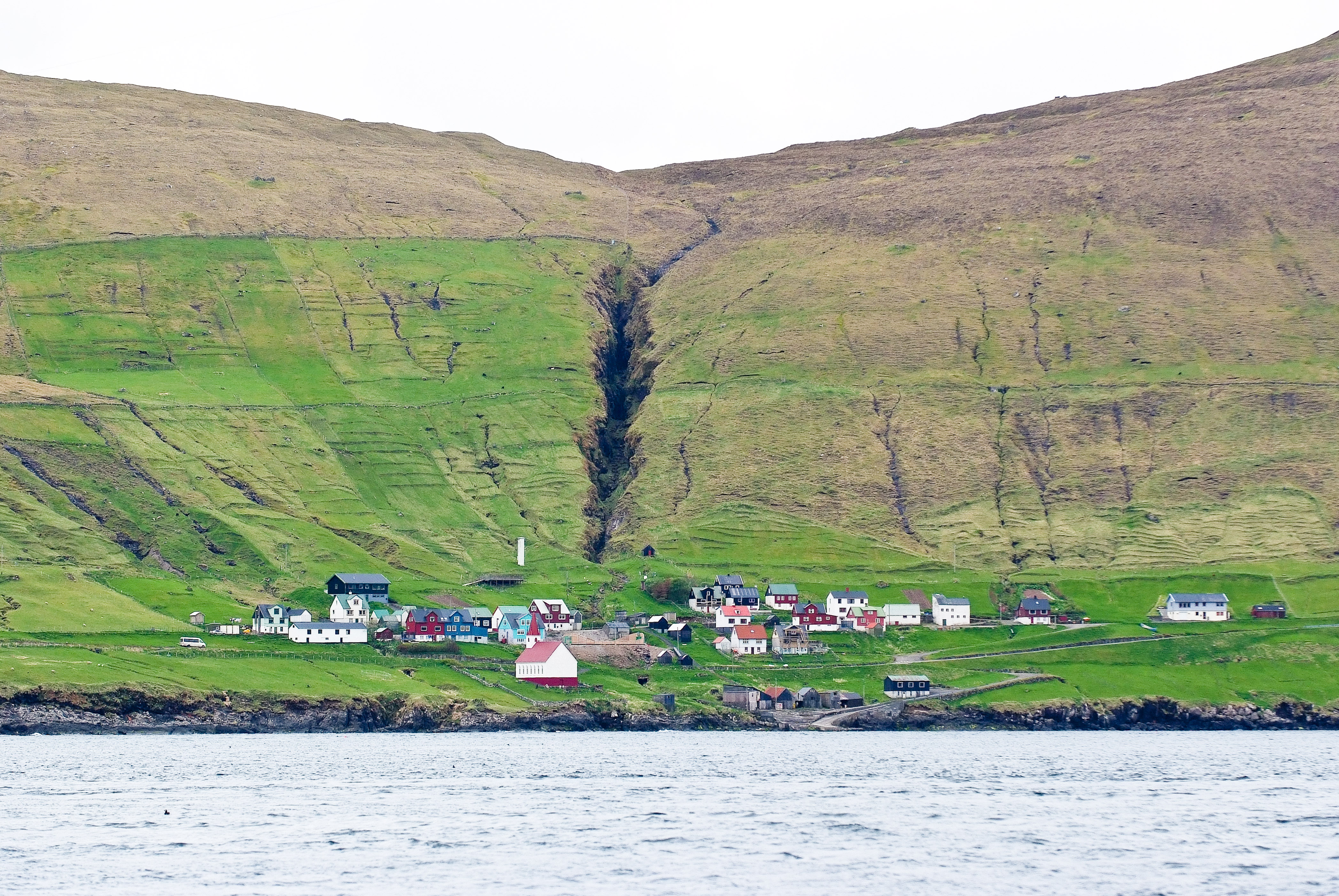

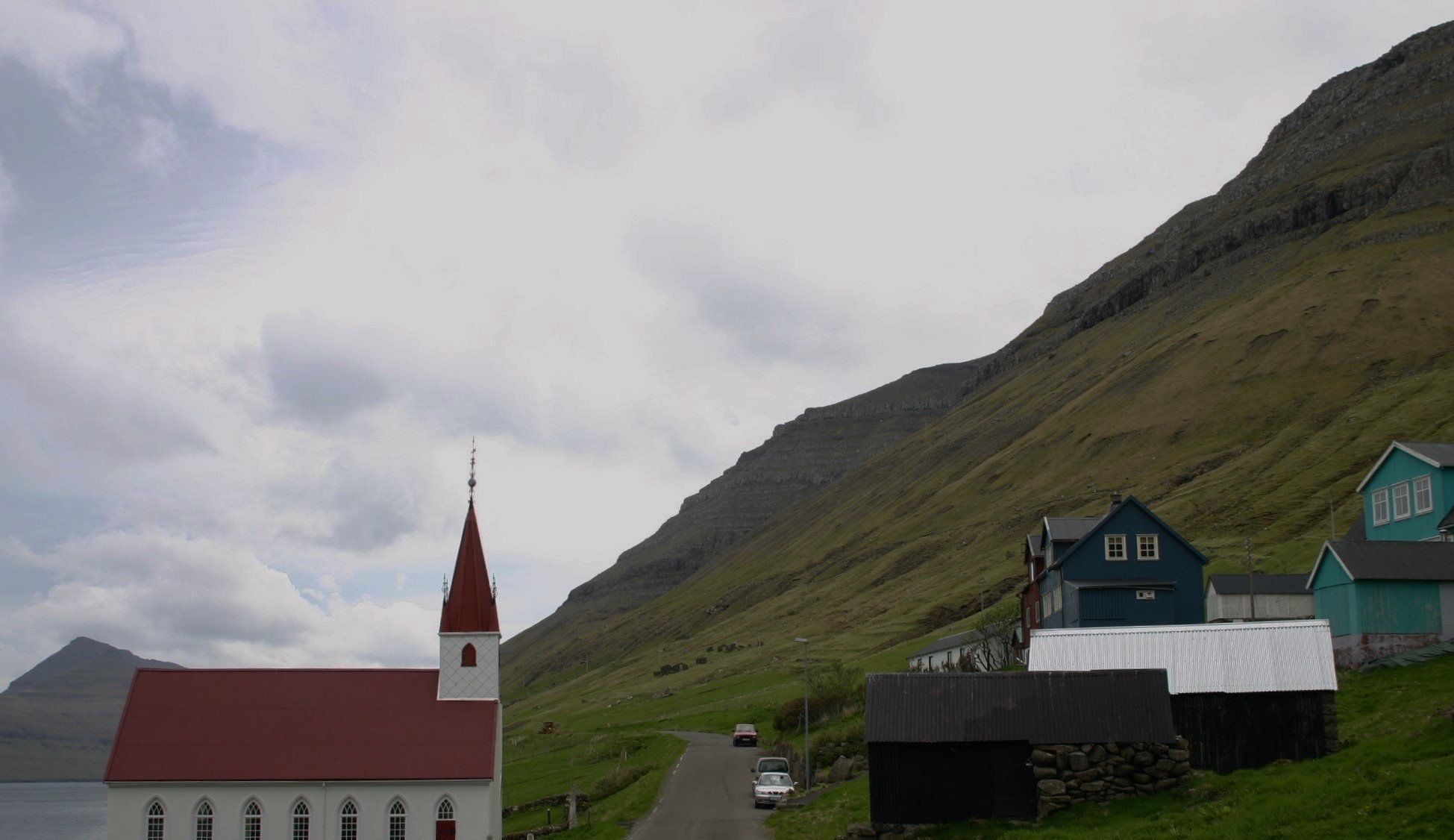

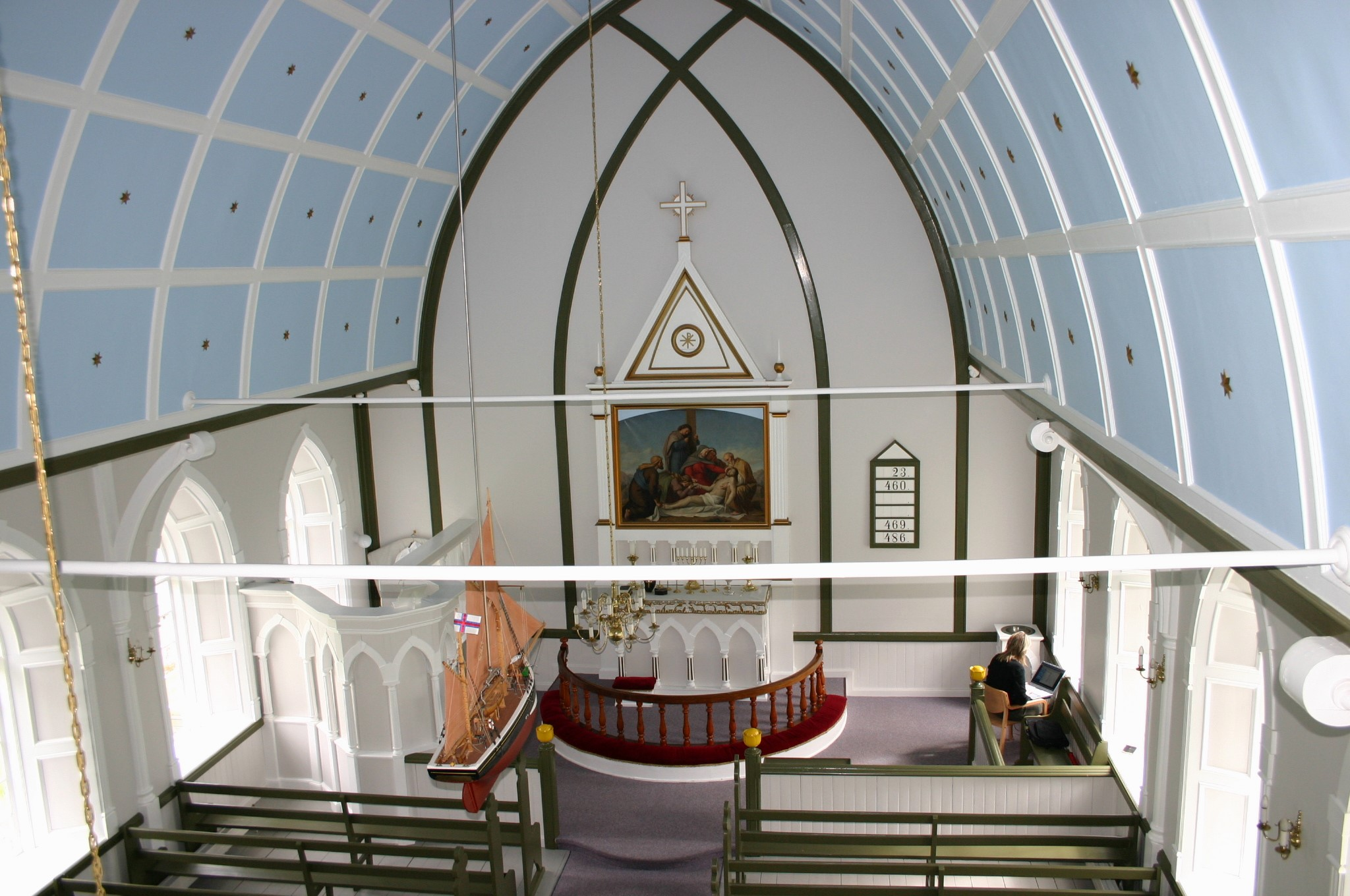

== See also ==
- List of towns in the Faroe Islands
