= Mikladalur =

- Village
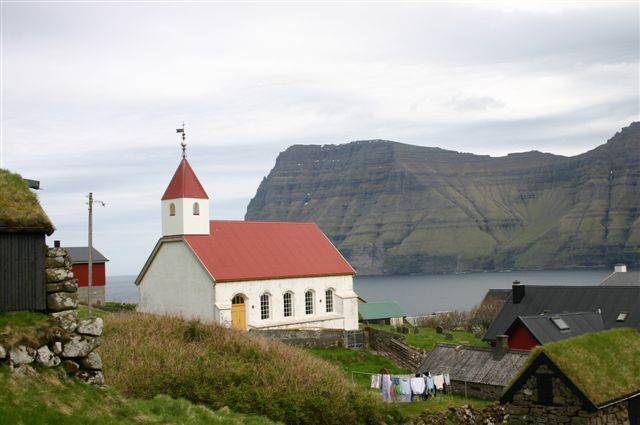
- Mikladalur Church, looking across to the island of Kunoy

- Location in the Faroe Islands
- Coordinates: 62°20′06″N 6°46′01″W
- State: Kingdom of Denmark
- Constituent country: Faroe Islands
- Island: Kalsoy
- Municipality: Klaksvík

Population (30 April 2025)
  - Total: 26
- Time zone: GMT
  - Summer (DST): UTC+1 (EST)
- Postal code: FO 797
- Climate: Cfc

Mikladalur, meaning "great valley or dale" is the largest of four villages on the northern Faroese island of Kalsoy in the municipality of Klaksvík. It is situated in a large U-shaped valley on the east coast of the island.

The town's stone church dates from 1856. A tunnel to Trøllanes to the north was completed in 1985.

== See also ==
- List of towns in the Faroe Islands
