= Svínoy =

- Island
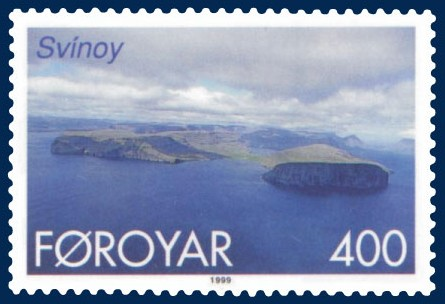
- Stamp FR 350 of Postverk Føroya (issued: 25 May 1999; photo: Per á Hædd)

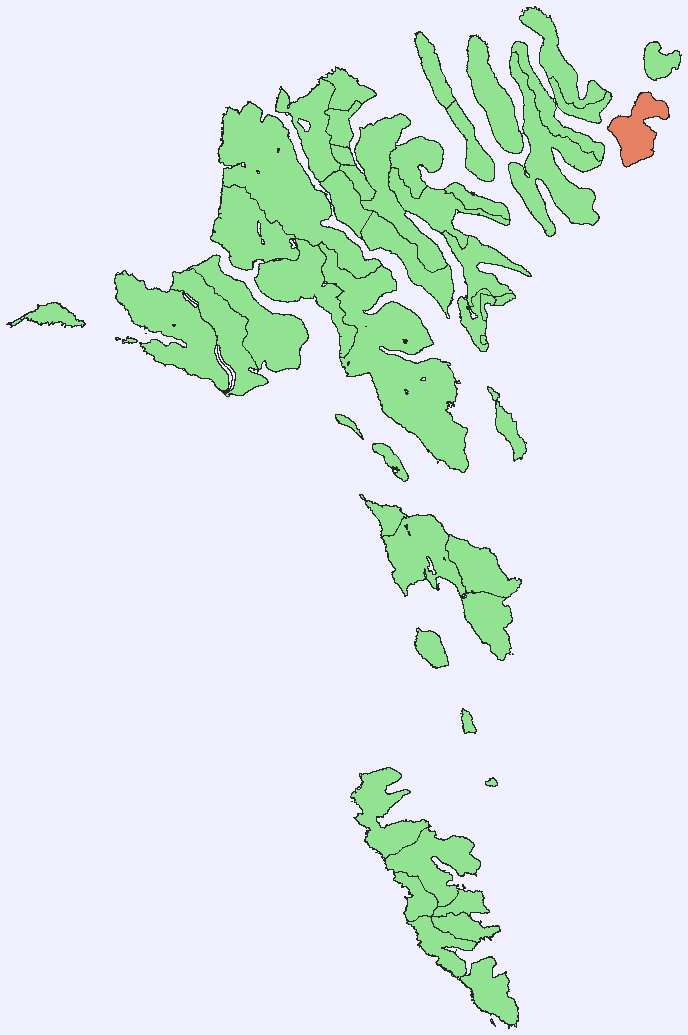
- Location within the Faroe Islands
- Coordinates: 62°16′N 6°22′W
- State: Kingdom of Denmark
- Constituent country: Faroe Islands

Area
  - Total: 27.1 km^{2} (10.5 sq mi)
  - Rank: 10
- Highest elevation: 586 m (1,923 ft)

Population (Nov 2020)
  - Total: 31
  - Density: 1.1/km^{2} (3.0/sq mi)
- Time zone: UTC+0 (GMT)
  - Summer (DST): UTC+1 (EST)
- Calling code: 298

Svínoy (Faroese pronunciation: [ˈsvʊinɪ], Danish: Svinø) is an island in the north-east of the Faroe Islands, to the east of Borðoy and Viðoy. It takes its name from Old Norse, Svíney, meaning "Swine Isle". Svinoy also refers to a section of the ocean where North Atlantic water flows into the Norwegian Sea. There is a similarly named island, Swona, in the Orkney Islands.

Svínoy like Kalsoy is a comparatively isolated island, in that there are no bridge, tunnel or causeway links to it. There are boat and helicopter connections.

== Geography ==
Svínoy is divided into two unequally sized peninsulas. The coast is mostly steep slopes and cliffs, including the 345-metre (1,132 ft) precipice of Eysturhøvdi on the north coast. It has only one settlement, also named Svínoy, where all the inhabitants live.

=== Important Bird Area ===
The coastline of the island has been identified as an Important Bird Area by BirdLife International because of its significance as a breeding site for seabirds, especially European storm petrels (25,000 pairs), Atlantic puffins (10,000 pairs) and black guillemots (100 pairs).

=== Mountains ===
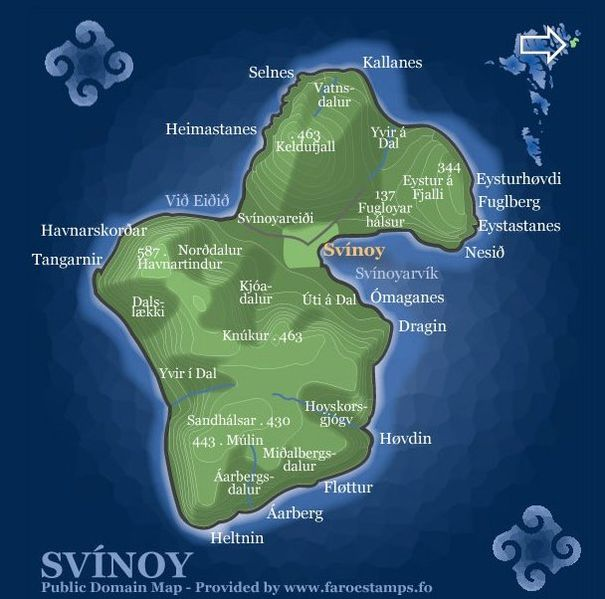
Map of Svinoy

There are seven mountains on Svínoy:

#	Name	Height
1.	Havnartindur	586 m
2.	Keldufjall	463 m
2.	Knúkur, vestari	463 m
4.	Knúkur	460 m
5.	Múlin	443 m
6.	Middagur	422 m
7.	Eysturhøvdi	344 m

== History ==
- 975 Viking Chief Svínoyar-Bjarni is mentioned in the Færeyinga saga. A headstone in the church is assumed to be Bjarni's memorial stone.
- 1583 Jacob Eudensen from Svinoy was the last person in the Faroe Islands to be condemned to death for heresy; he had refused to renounce his Catholic faith and convert to Lutheranism.

== Gallery ==
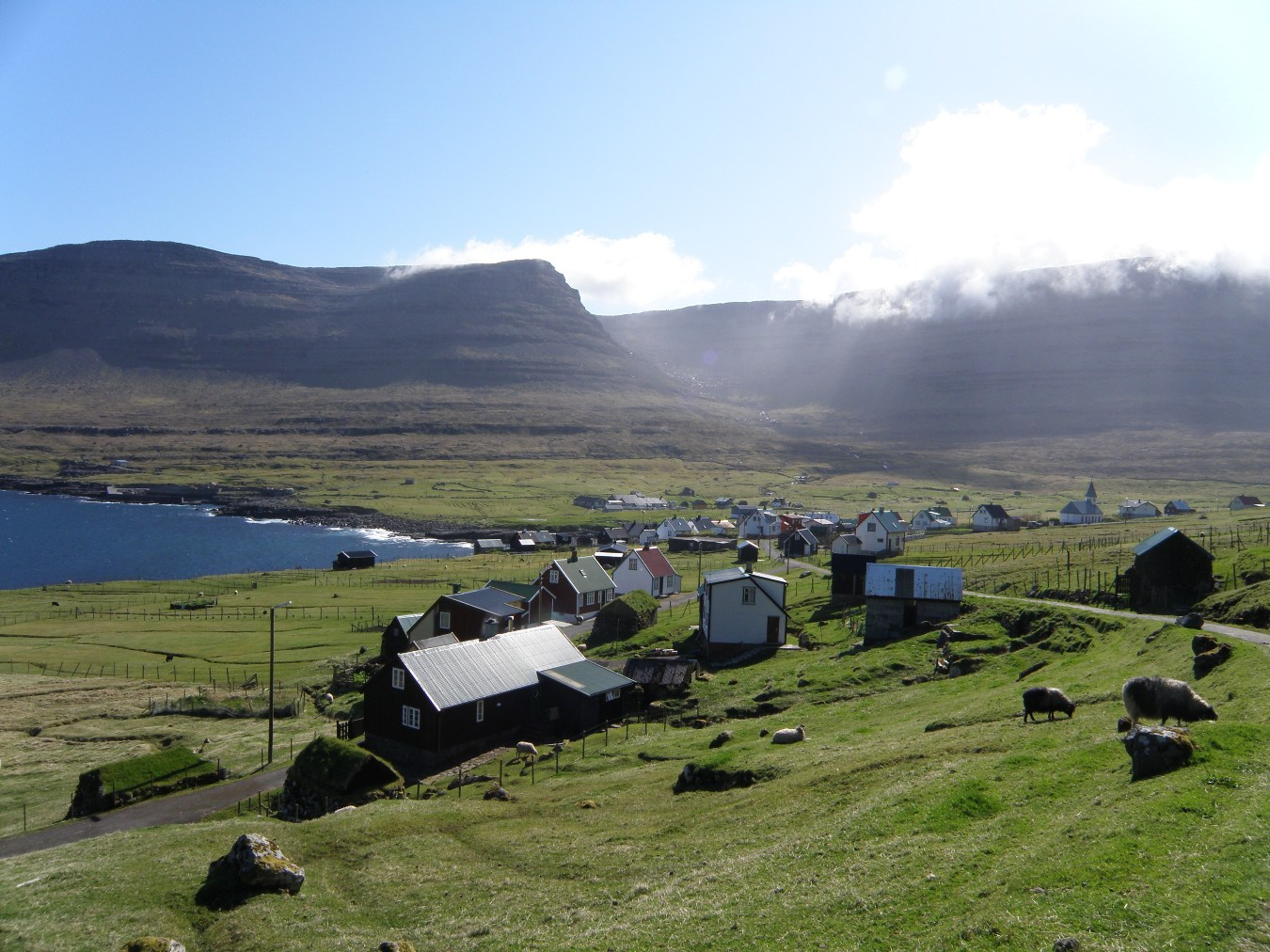
Svínoy village

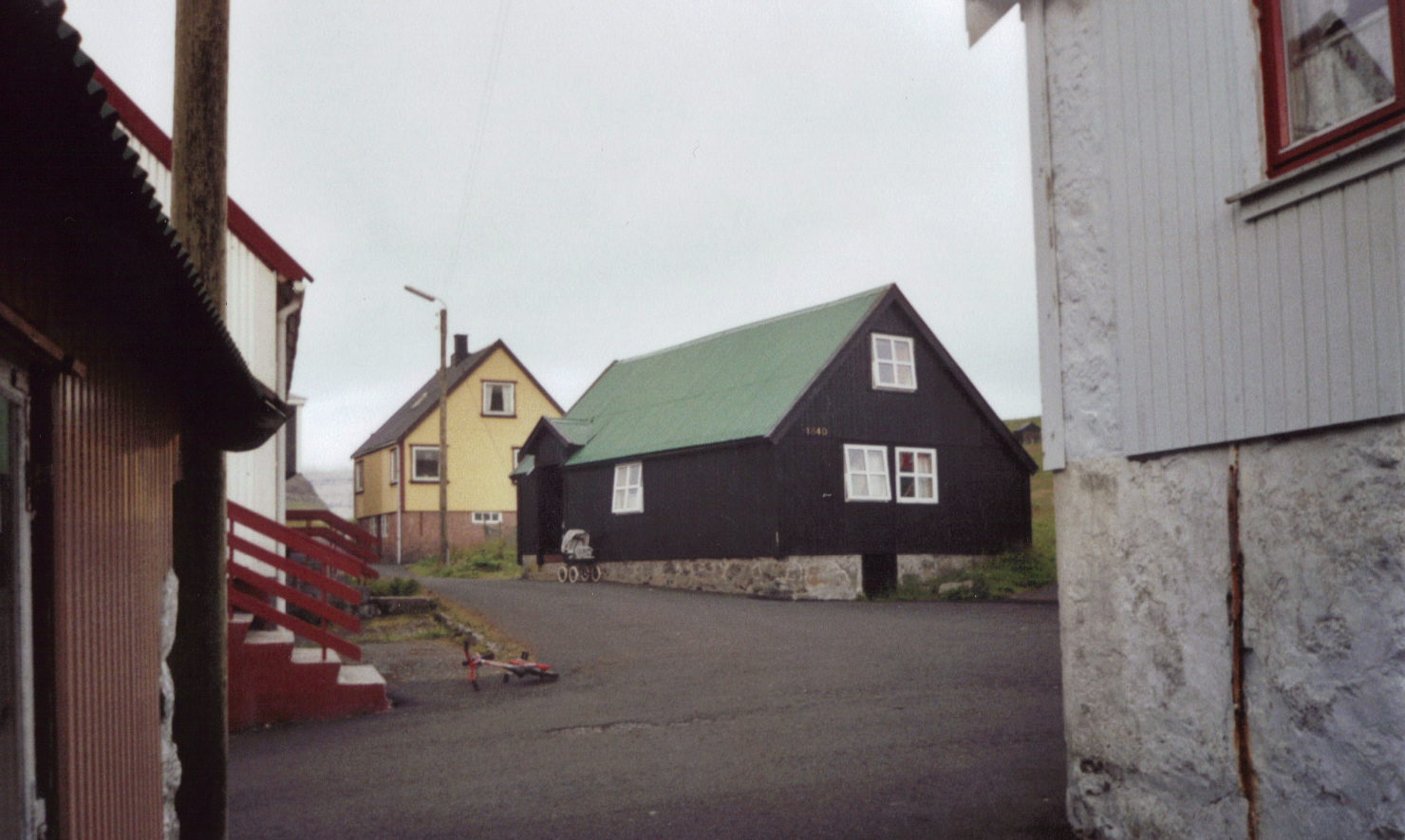
Svínoy

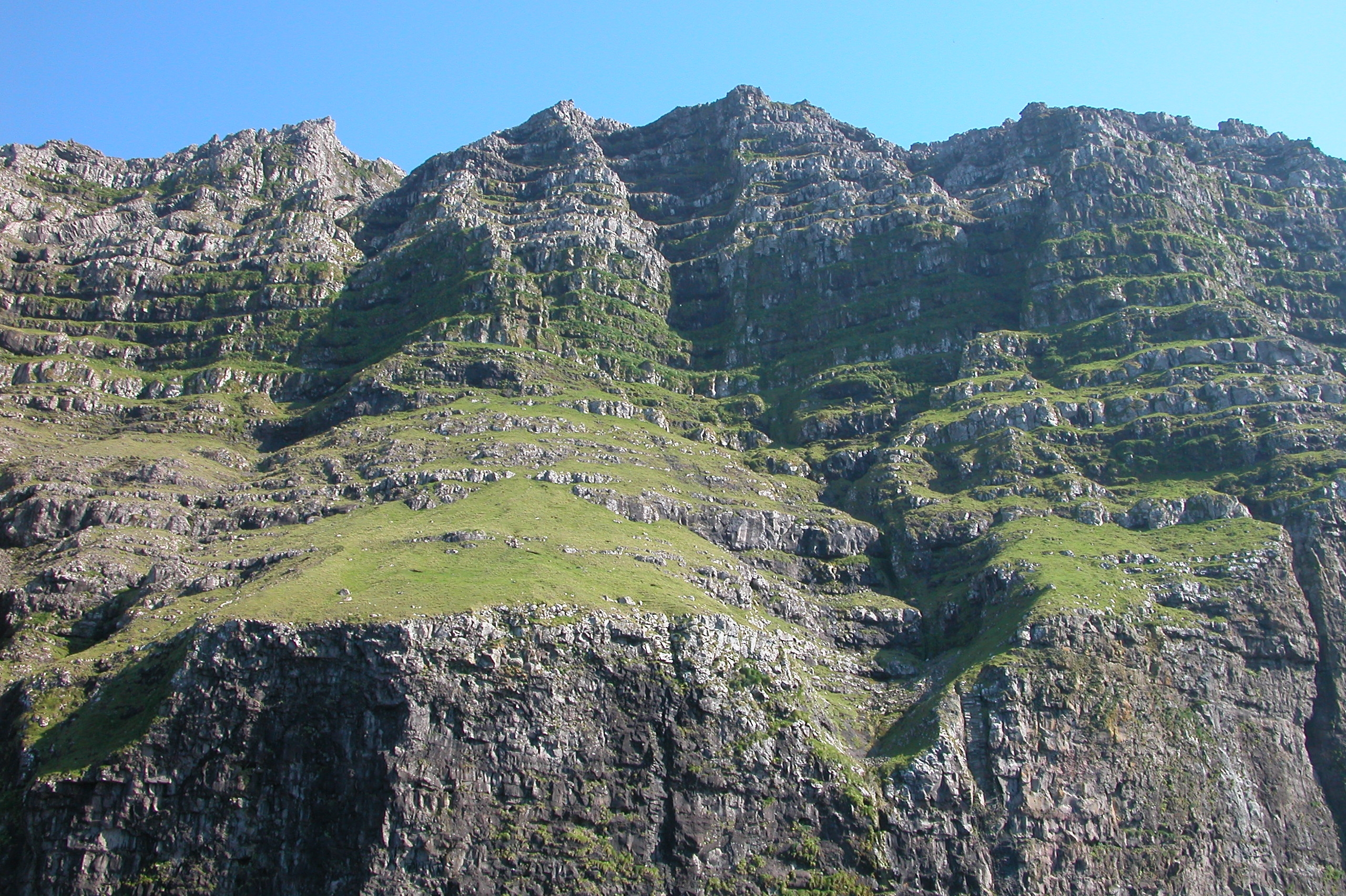
The coast of Svínoy

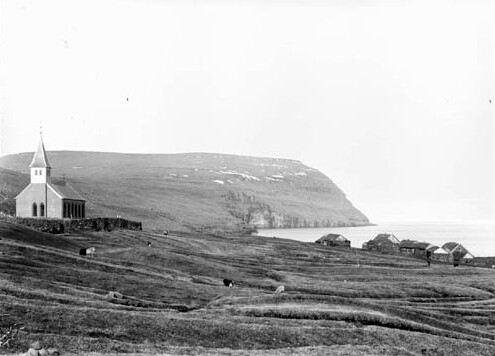
Svínoy in 1899
