= Koltur =

Koltur Kolter, Kolterø
- Island
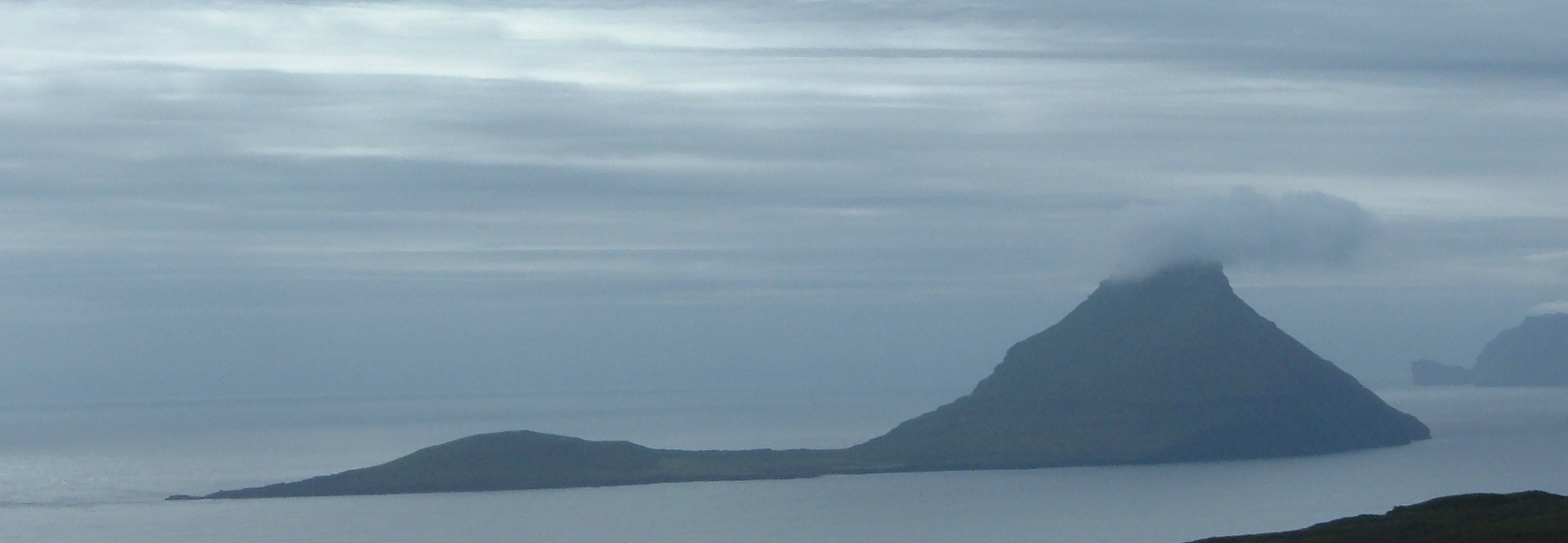
- Koltur as seen from Streymoy, with the mountain of Kolturshamar centre right

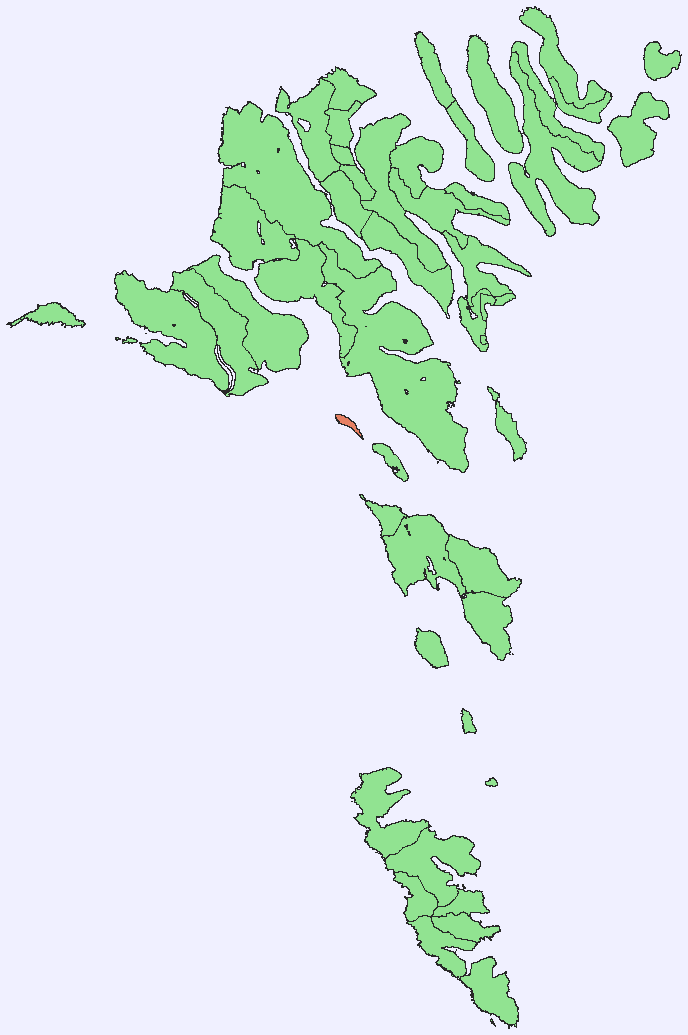
- Location within the Faroe Islands
- Coordinates: 61°59′N 6°58′W
- State: Kingdom of Denmark
- Constituent country: Faroe Islands
- Municipality seat: Tórshavnar kommuna

Area
  - Total: 2.8 km^{2} (1.1 sq mi)
  - Rank: 17
- Highest elevation: 478 m (1,568 ft)

Population (2023)
  - Total: 0
  - Rank: 17
  - Density: 0.0/km^{2} (0.0/sq mi)
- Time zone: UTC+0 (GMT)
  - Summer (DST): UTC+1 (EST)
- Calling code: 298
- Climate: Cfc

Koltur is an island in the Faroe Islands, located to the west of Streymoy and to the north-west of Hestur. The name 'Koltur' means 'colt', in contrast with the name of the larger island to the south-east, 'Hestur', which means 'horse'. The island has just one settlement, Koltur. It was abandoned in the 1980s by the sheep-farmers whose flocks grazed on the southern part of the island. Since then only two people have returned (in 1994). Koltur has two mountains, Kolturshamar (478 m) and Fjallið (101m) which strictly speaking is not a mountain, the name however translates directly as "The Mountain" and is considered by many as the smallest mountain in the country.

The island supports 160 adult sheep.

== History ==
Archaeological excavations have found that barley has been cultivated on the island as far back as 800–900AD, in the early Viking age. It continued to be cultivated up to near modern times, as straw from Koltur was considered the best for thatching, because there are no mice in the island to diminish the quality of the straw. All peat for fuel had to be cut at Syðradal and Fossdal on Streymoy or later in Skopun, Sandoy, and then transported by boat back to Koltur where it was stored in houses at Gróthústanga.

There have been two settlements on the islands, Heima í Húsi and Norðuri í Gerði. There is a story that the two families who lived there couldn't agree about anything and never helped each other with anything, this went on for generations and in the end, it was forgotten what the original argument was about. Though the place-name Trætumørkin, hints at the argument being about a parcel of land.

Heima í Húsi is the older settlement and it is thought it is the original settlement on the island. It contains two farms: Niðri í Húsi and Uppi í Búð, The buildings are remarkably well preserved, and although they have had running repairs through the centuries there has been very little modernization compared to the rest of the country, and thus give a great insight into how people have lived in the past.

Norðuri í Gerði is newer than Heima í Húsi, but its old buildings are in much worse condition. Though in the Jarðarbókini from 1584 it is confirmed that this settlement already had been built by then. This is the location of the only inhabited house today.

In 1890 there were 42 people living on the island, spread over 6 families. 1954 was the last time anyone was buried in the cemetery. The cemetery lies some 600 metres to the north-east of the settlement of Norðuri í Gerði; the isolation from the settlement is said to be due to its being haunted, as it could often go long stretches of time before a priest came to the island to throw earth on the grave, and put the dead properly to rest according to custom.

=== Conservation ===
In 1987, Føroya Forngripafelag called for a plan to be made to preserve the island's historically important locations. A formal plan for its conservation and continued habitation was put forward in 1990, and on 11 June 1992, it was formally adopted. As a result, some buildings between the two settlements had been repaired by 1996. In 1996, Fornminninevndin proposed to expand the conservation of the settlements, and their proposal was approved in 2000. Between 2000 and 2012, conservation efforts were undertaken in stages, with funding coming from various sources. In 2008 the Mc-Kinney Møllers Fond donated 5 million DKK to the restoration project. The project was deemed complete in 2012, and is now open as a museum. Efforts are ongoing to have the island listed as a national park, as it is the only island which is run as an organic farm.

== Transport ==
Up until 2024, there was a regular helicopter connection throughout the year, but this was scrapped in June 2024 by Atlantic Airways after the last residents left the island, despite the continued demand for a cost-effective method of reaching Koltur by tourists during the summer season. In summertime, local boat companies offer day trips from Gamlarætt and Tórshavn, but at over-inflated prices which far exceed the costs of visiting by helicopter.

== Important Bird Area ==
Most of the coastline of the island has been identified as an Important Bird Area by BirdLife International because of its significance as a breeding site for seabirds, especially European storm petrels (5000 pairs), Atlantic puffins (20,000 pairs) and black guillemots (50 pairs). It was once a breeding ground for the extinct great auk.

== Gallery ==
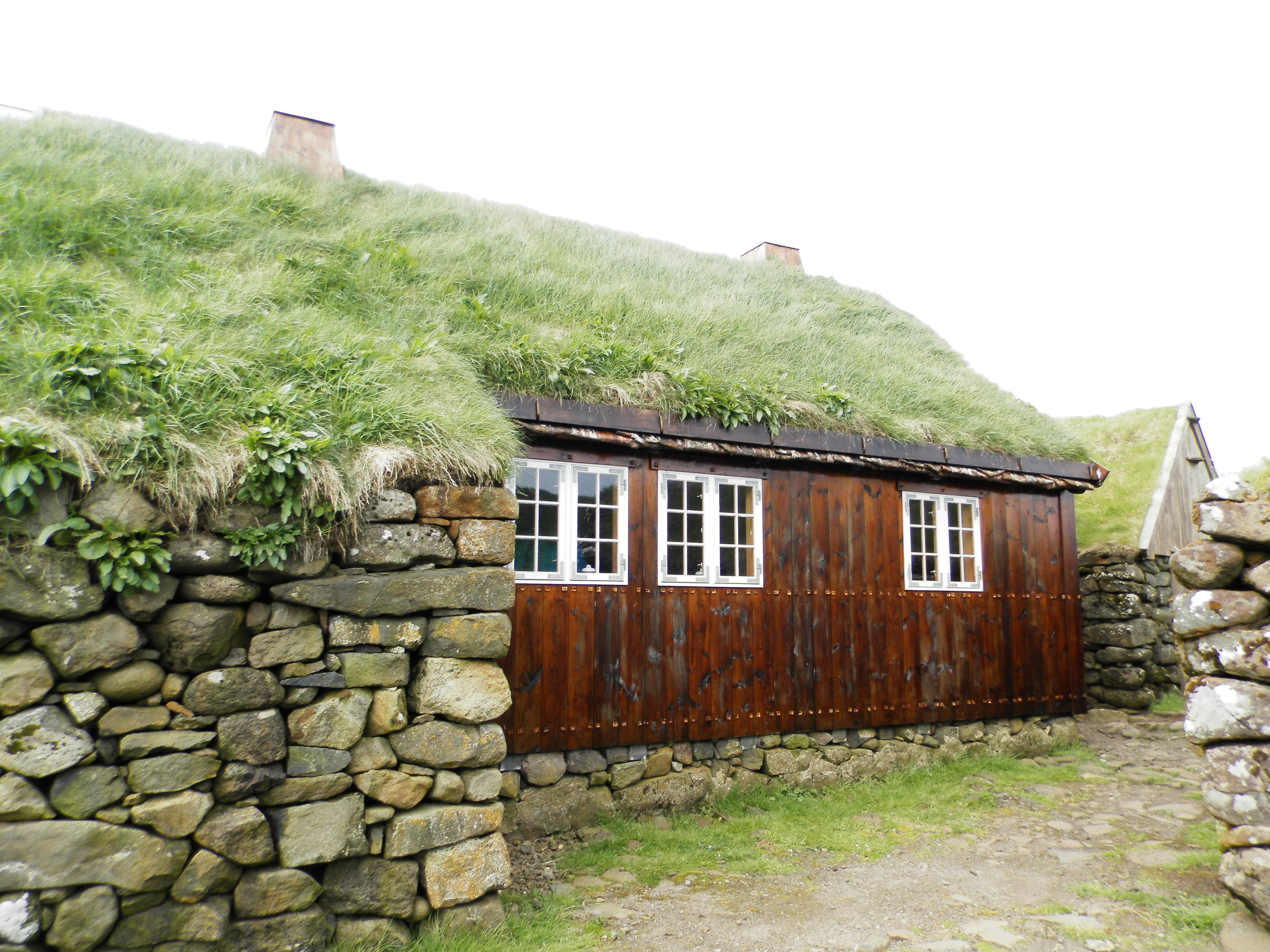
Old stone and wooden houses with turf roof in Koltur

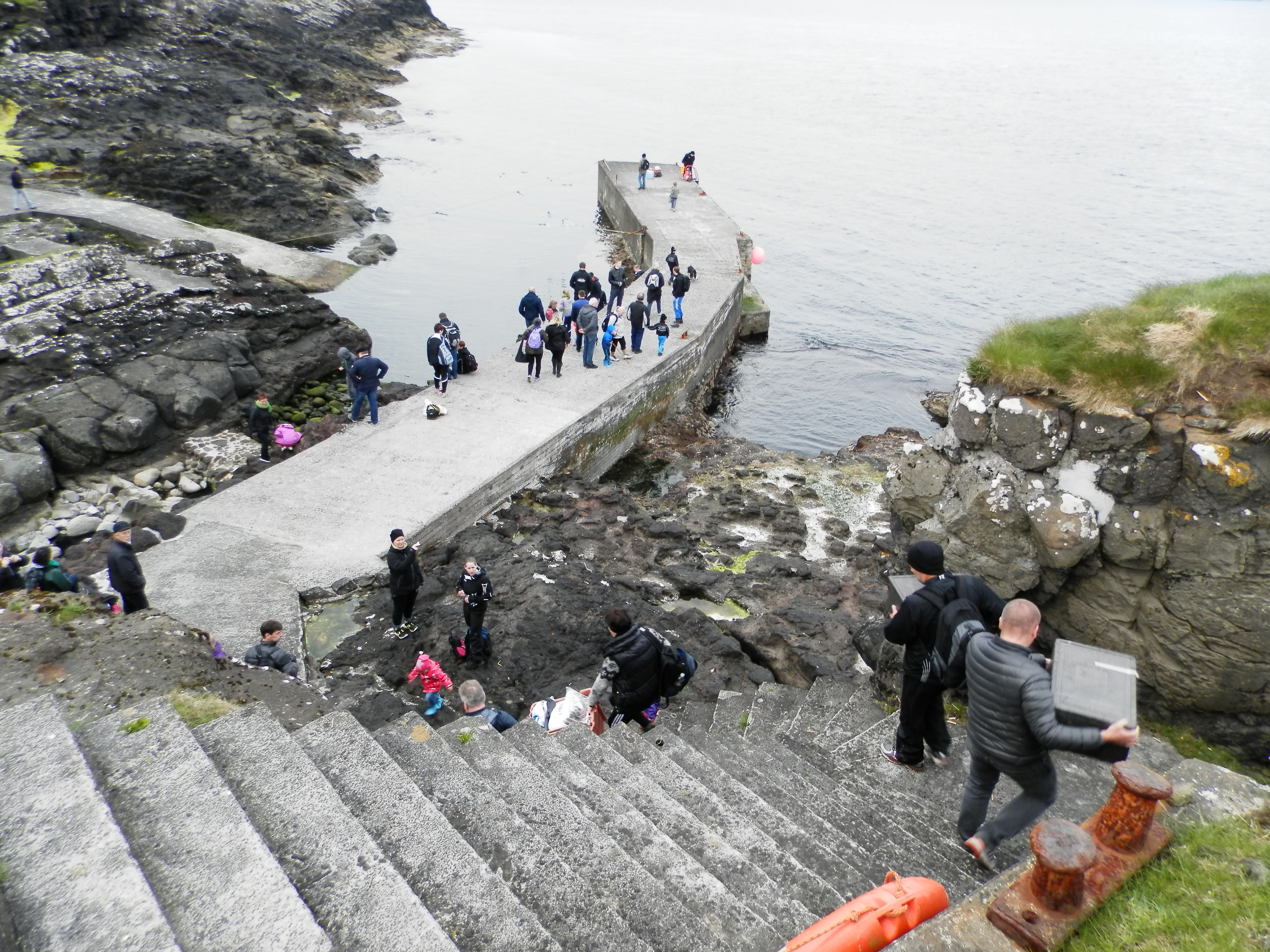
The port of Koltur

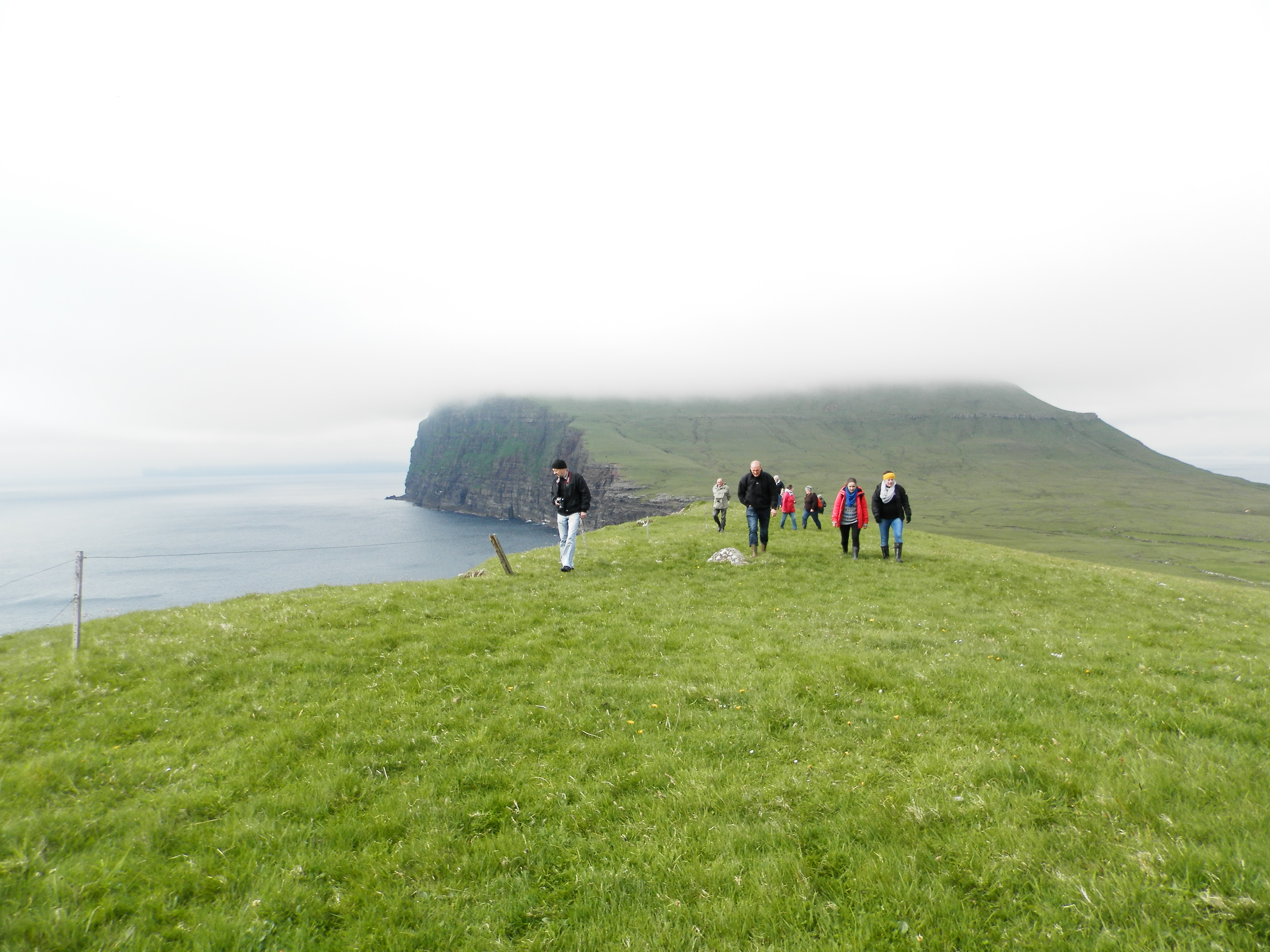
View from the southern mountain of Koltur

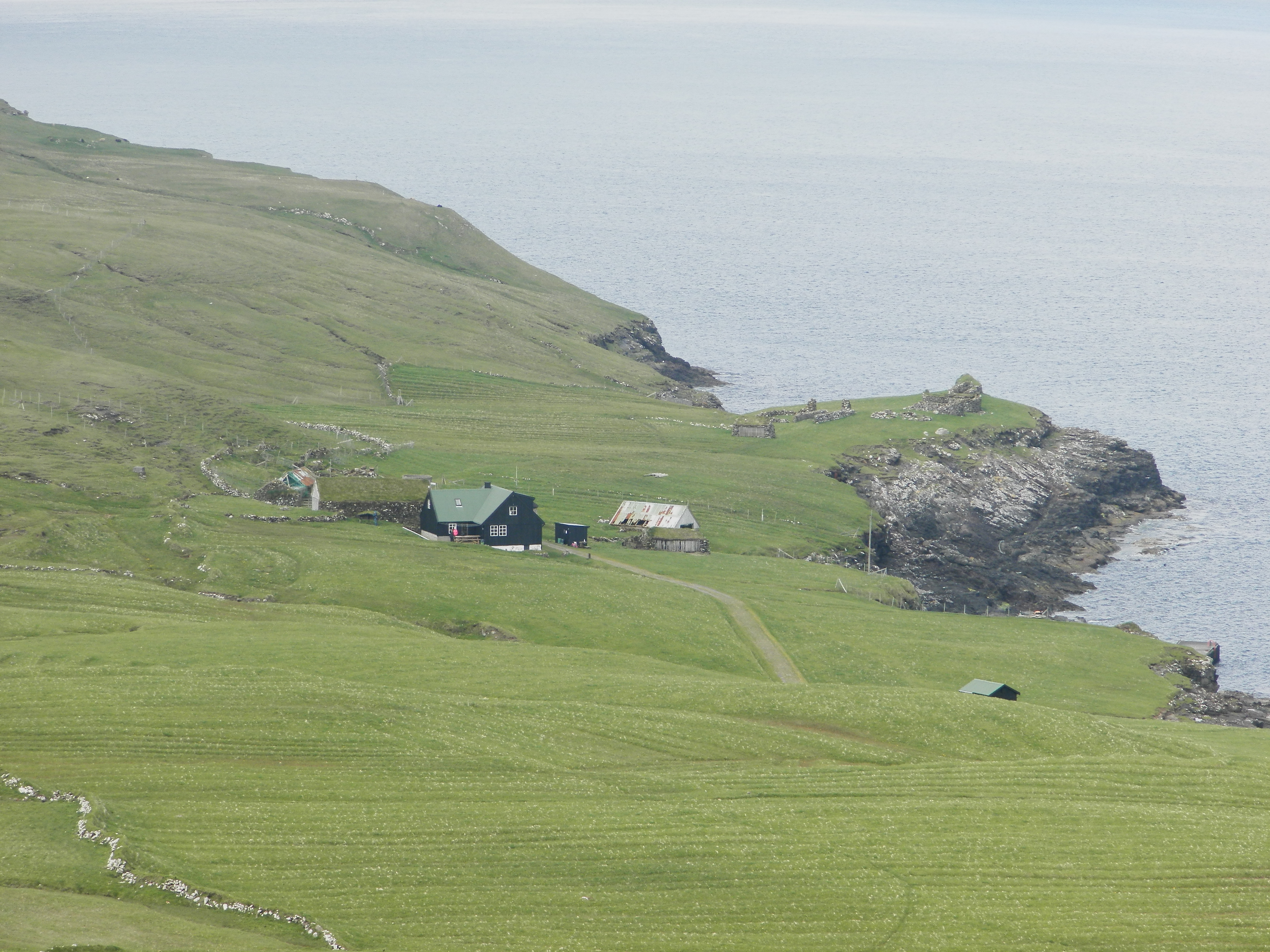
Koltur, view to the farmhouse

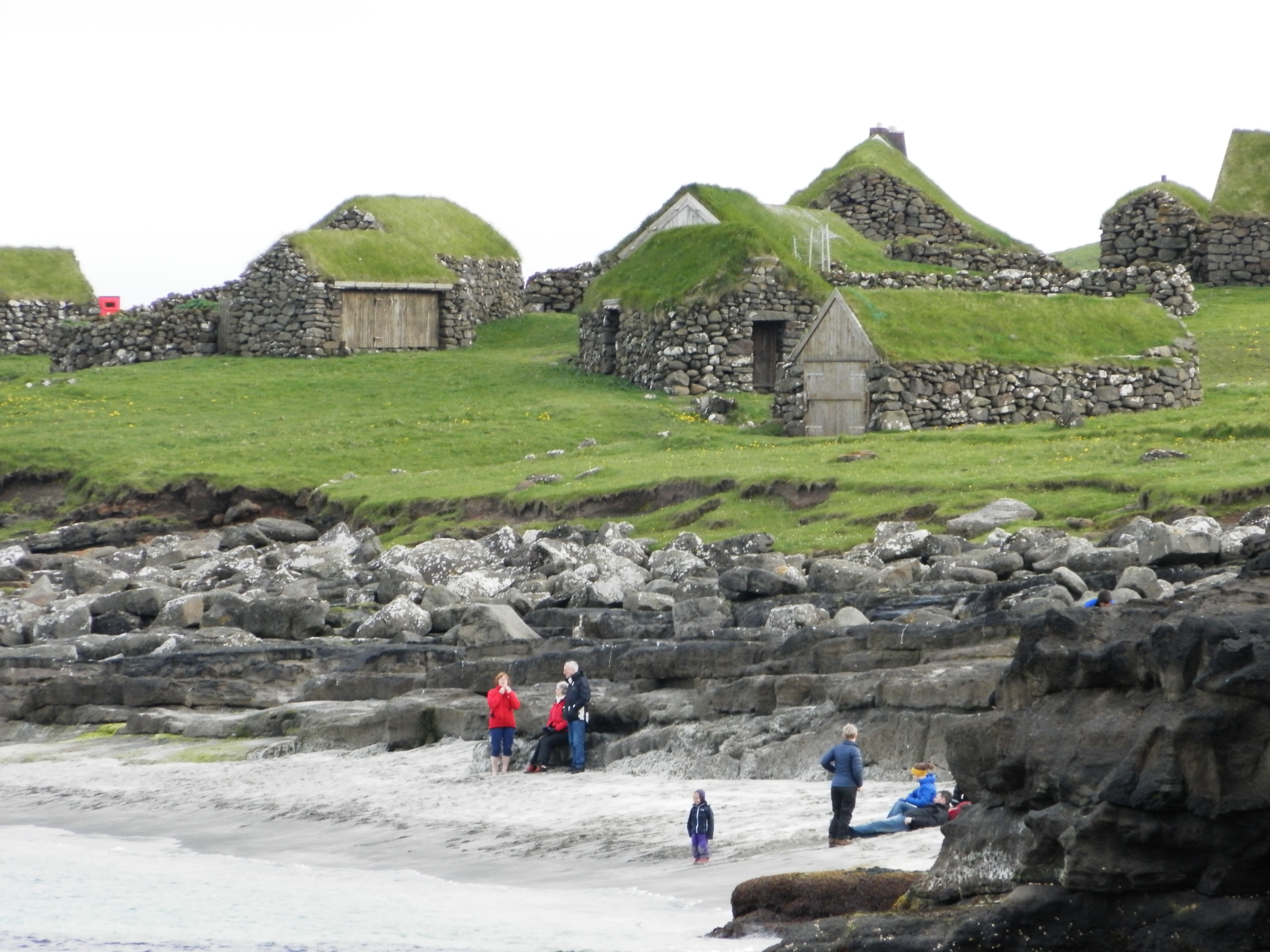
The sandy beach of Koltur and the old houses Heimi í Garði

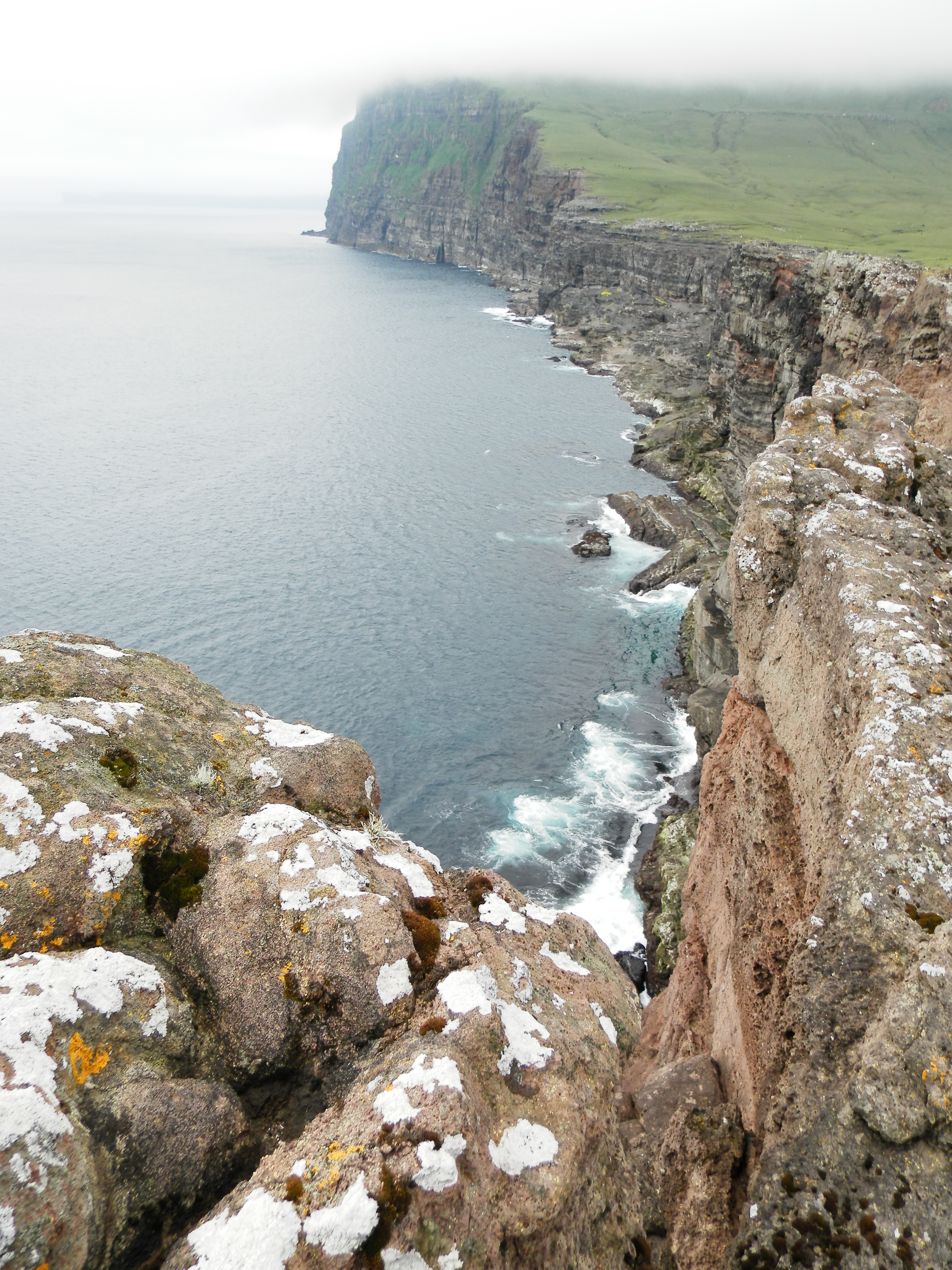
The cliffs of Koltur's west coast
