= Viðoy =

- Island
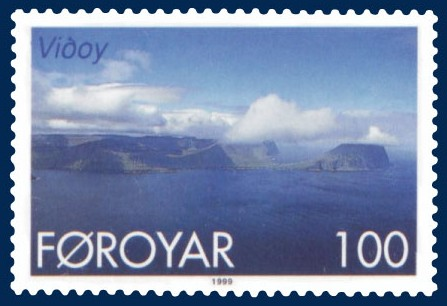
- Stamp FR 349 of Postverk Føroya (issued: 25 May 1999; photo: Per á Hædd)

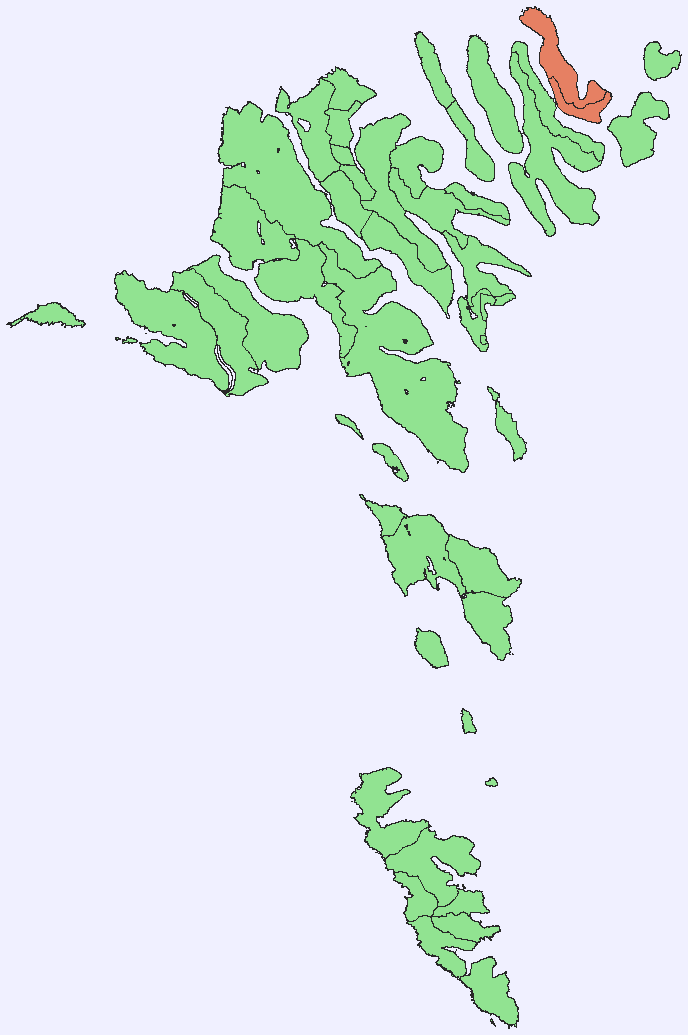
- Location within the Faroe Islands
- Coordinates: 62°20′N 6°31′W
- State: Kingdom of Denmark
- Constituent country: Faroe Islands
- Municipality seat: Viðareiði

Area
  - Total: 41 km^{2} (16 sq mi)
  - Rank: 7
- Highest elevation: 841 m (2,759 ft)

Population (12-2018)
  - Total: 605
  - Rank: 7
  - Density: 15/km^{2} (38/sq mi)
- Time zone: UTC+0 (GMT)
  - Summer (DST): UTC+1 (EST)
- Calling code: 298

Viðoy (Faroese pronunciation: [ˈviːjɔɪ], Danish: Viderø) is the northernmost island in the Faroe Islands, located east of Borðoy to which it is linked via a causeway. The name means wood island, despite the fact that no trees grow on the island; the name relates to the driftwood that floats in from Siberia and North America.

== Geography ==
The island has two settlements: Hvannasund on the south-west coast and Viðareiði on the north-west coast, the northernmost settlement in the Faroes. A road along the west coast of the island connects the two. The island is connected by a road causeway from Hvannasund to Norðdepil on Borðoy, and a bus service from Klaksvík runs across the causeway to the island.

=== Important bird area ===
The island's northern and eastern coast has been identified as an Important Bird Area by BirdLife International because of its significance as a breeding site for seabirds, especially European storm petrels (500 pairs), black-legged kittiwakes (5300 pairs), Atlantic puffins (25,000 pairs), common guillemots (6700 individuals) and black guillemots (200 pairs).

=== Mountains ===
Rank	Name	Height (m)
3	Villingadalsfjall	841
24	Nakkurin (norðari)	754
29	Malinsfjall	750
52	Filthatturin	688
53	Oyggjarskoratindur	687
67	Enni	651
84	Sneis	634
116	Tunnafjall	593
147	Talvborð	557
174	Mølin	511
192	Nakkurin	481

Viðoy has eleven mountains, of which Villingadalsfjall is the northernmost peak in the Faroes. The north coast also has the Enniberg cliff, which at 750 m is the second-highest sea-cliff in Europe (after Hornelen, in Norway). The mountains are shown with their overall rank in the Faroe Islands.

== See also ==
List of mountains of the Faroe Islands
