= Kalsoy =

- Island
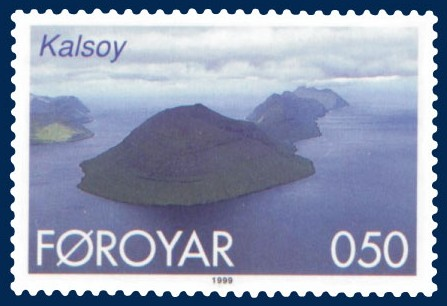
- Kalsoy

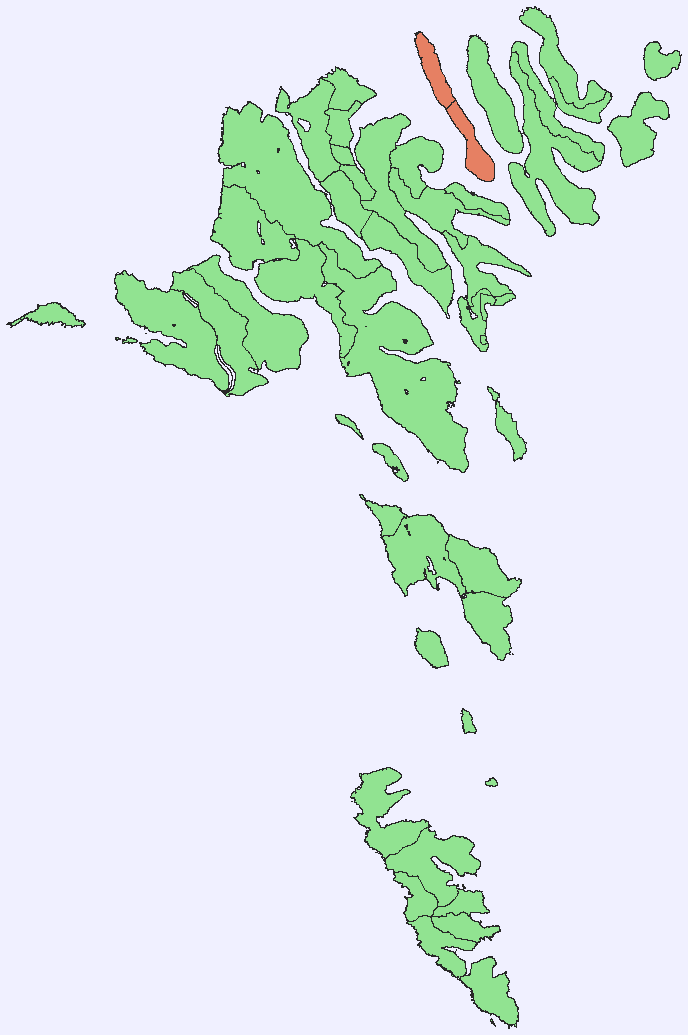
- Location within the Faroe Islands
- Coordinates: 62°17′N 6°44′W
- State: Kingdom of Denmark
- Constituent country: Faroe Islands
- Municipality seat: Klaksvík

Area
  - Total: 30.9 km^{2} (11.9 sq mi)
  - Rank: 9
- Highest elevation: 787 m (2,582 ft)

Population (2018)
  - Total: 76
  - Rank: 9
  - Density: 2.5/km^{2} (6.4/sq mi)
- Time zone: UTC+0 (GMT)
  - Summer (DST): UTC+1 (EST)
- Calling code: 298

Kalsoy (Faroese pronunciation: [ˈkalsɔɪ], Danish: Kalsø) is an island in the north-east of the Faroe Islands of Denmark between Eysturoy and Kunoy. The name means man island; by contrast with the parallel island to the east, Kunoy, the name of which means woman island.

The northernmost part and scenery of Kalsoy was used as stand-in for the Kuril Islands in eastern Russia while filming for the 25th James Bond movie No Time to Die. In the film, which was released in 2021, the villain's lair is located on the island, for which a harbour and missile silos were added digitally.

Kalsoy, like Svínoy, is a comparatively isolated island, in that no bridge, tunnel, or causeway links to it.

== Geography ==
The western coast has steep cliffs for the full length of the island, whereas valleys on the eastern slopes protect the four tiny settlements, Húsar, Mikladalur, Syðradalur, and Trøllanes, whose combined populations total less than 80. They are connected by a partly surfaced road which passes through four dark tunnels. The island's thin shape and road tunnels give it the nickname "the recorder" (Faroese: blokkfloytan). A lighthouse is located at Kallur, the northern tip of Kalsoy.

=== Important bird area ===
The northern and western coastline of the island has been identified as an important bird area by BirdLife International because of its significance as a breeding site for seabirds, especially Atlantic puffins (40,000 pairs), European storm petrels (5000 pairs), and black guillemots (200 pairs).

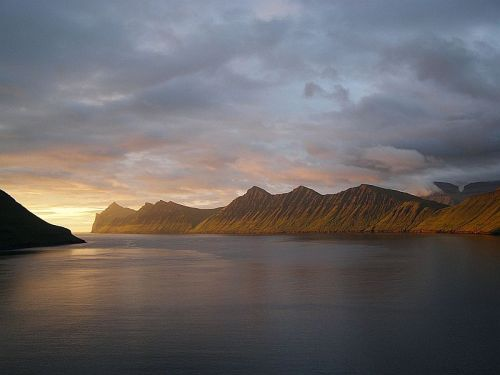
Kalsoy, western coast

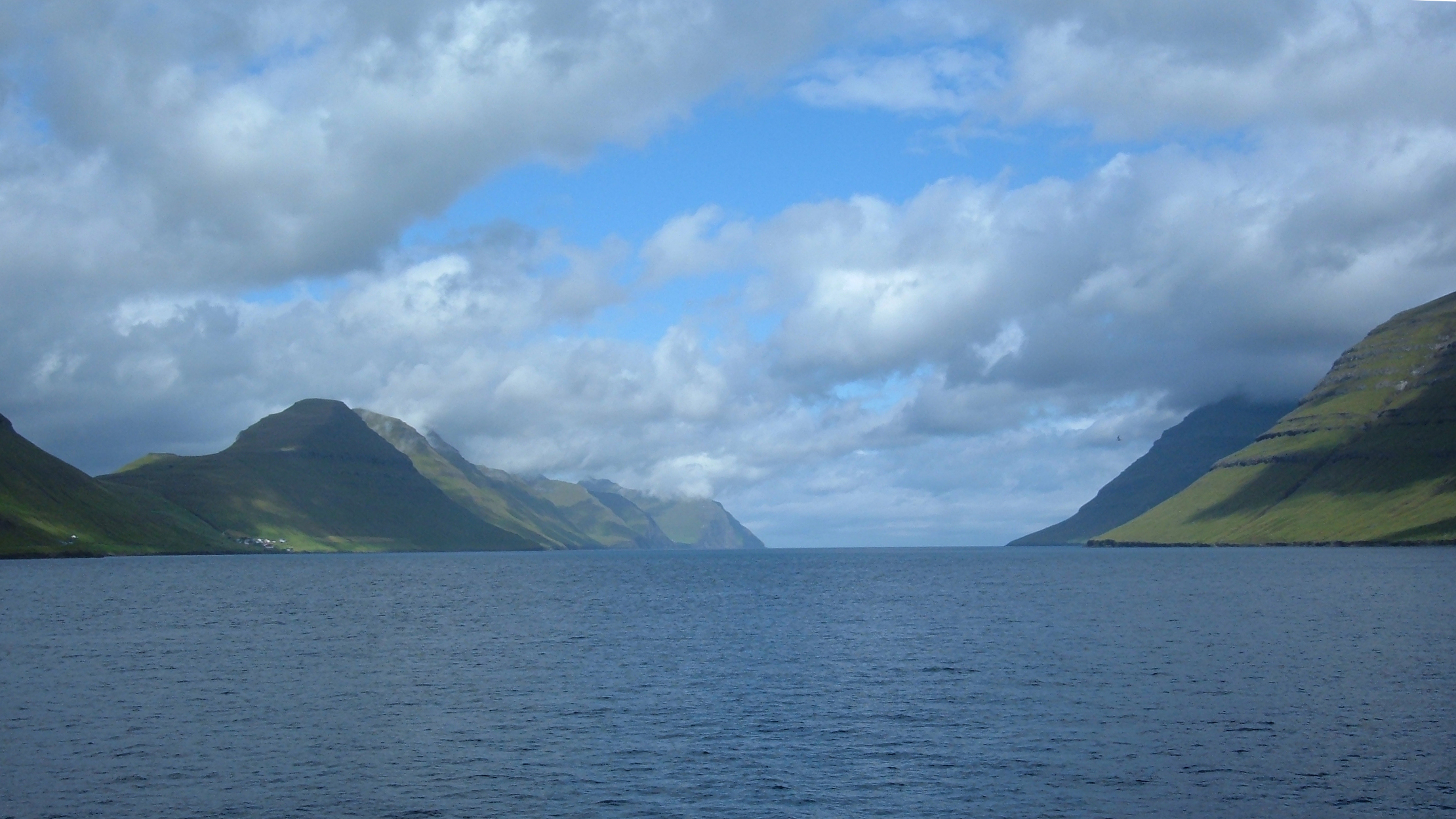
The Kalsoyarfjørður with Kalsoy (left) and Kunoy (right)

=== Mountains ===
The island has 13 peaks, the two highest of which are Nestindar (787 m) and Botnstindur (743 m).

== Travel ==
Ferry landings occur at Syðradalur, and one of the mail boats (named Sam) makes regular trips from Klaksvík to both settlements. One can walk north all the way to the lighthouse at Kallur but the four unlit tunnels on the way make carrying a torch advisable. Traffic is insufficient to pose problems with exhaust gases. The northernmost tunnel through to Trøllanes is narrow, cold, damp, and over 2 km long. It is rarely used by vehicles since the population of Trøllanes is only 20. The alternative overland route from Mikladalur to Trøllanes is a dangerous and precipitous path that is best avoided.

Bus service between Húsar and Trøllanes also is provided.

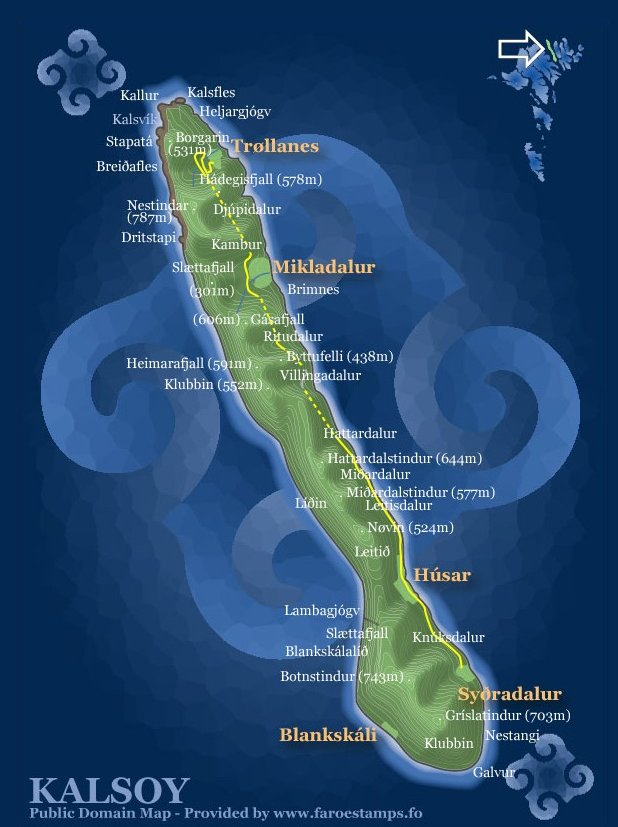
Map of Kalsoy

== Legends ==
Kalsoy has many legends, the best known of which is the legend of the Selkie or Seal-Woman of Mikladalur.

A young farmer from the town of Mikladalur on Kalsoy Island went to the beach to watch the selkies dance. He hid the skin of a beautiful selkie maid, so she could not go back to sea, and forced her to marry him. He kept her skin in a chest and the key with him both day and night. One day when out fishing, he discovered that he had forgotten to bring his key. When he returned home, the selkie wife had escaped back to sea, leaving their children behind. Later, when the farmer was out on a hunt, she killed both her selkie husband and two selkie sons, and she promised to take revenge upon the men of Mikladalur. Some shall be drowned, some shall fall from cliffs and slopes, and this shall continue, until so many men have been lost that they will be able to link arms around the whole island of Kalsoy; occasional deaths still occur in this way on the island.

This revenge has always been taken seriously, not only in Kalsoy, but also in the Faroe Islands generally. The descendants of the Seal-Woman are still known in the country by certain characteristics, especially their short fingers.
