= Settlement village =

Settlement in the Faroe Islands that was founded during the 1800s or early 1900s

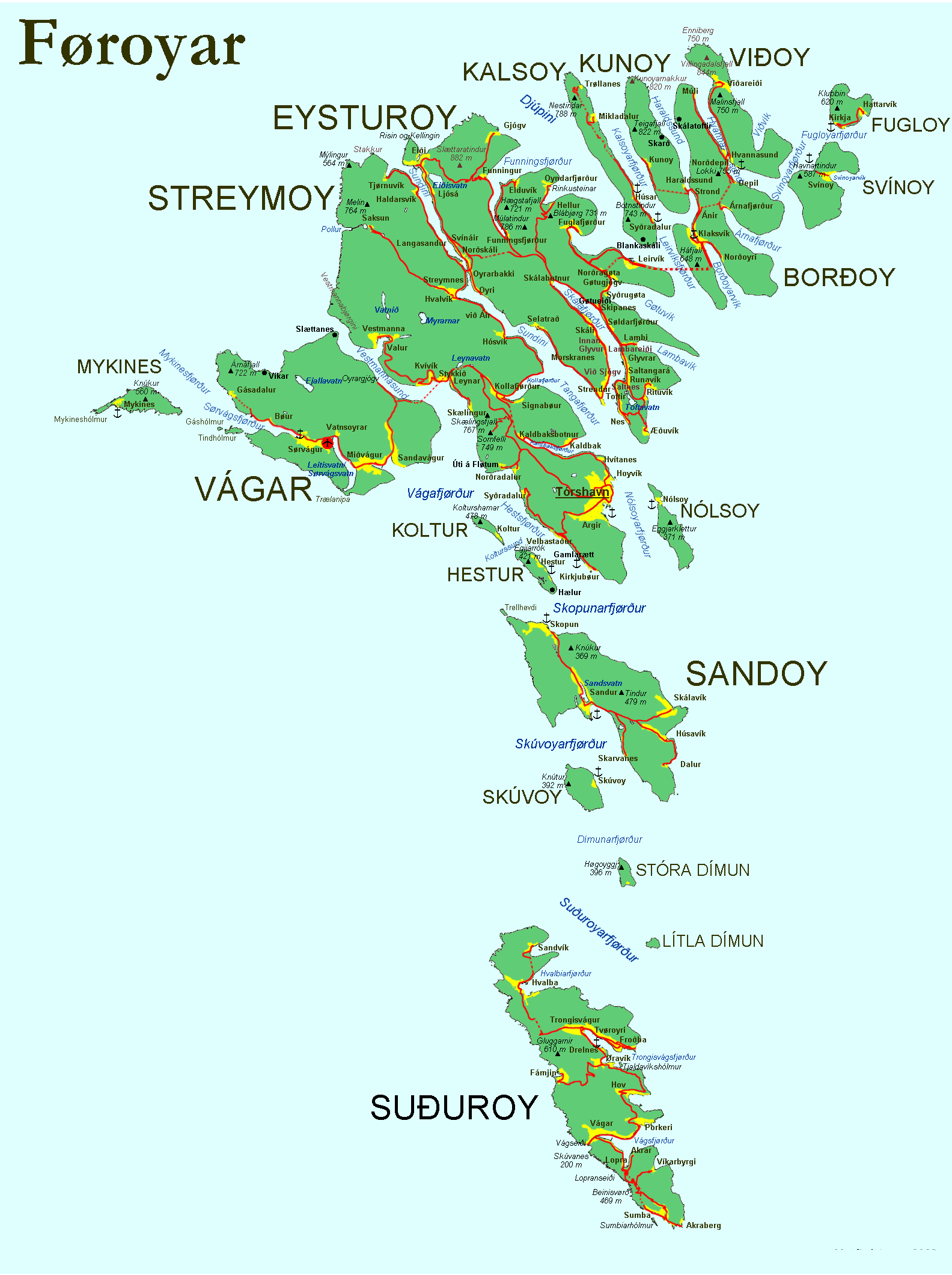
Map of the Faroe Islands

A settlement village (Faroese: niðursetubygd) is a settlement in the Faroe Islands that was founded during the 1800s or early 1900s. The population of the islands grew quickly from 1800 onward, resulting in a shortage of land in the older villages. Many new villages were established on the periphery of the older ones, and therefore few of the new villages contained state-owned leasehold land (Faroese: kongsjørð).

Starting in the late 1800s, the Faroes developed from an agricultural society with coastal fishing as secondary occupation to a fairly uniform fishing-based economy with a large land-based fish-processing industry. Industrialization led to significant centralization of the population, so that some of the new farming villages were depopulated quickly.

The following villages were established as settlement villages: Æðuvík (1897), Akrar (1817), Ánirnar (1840s), Fossá (1830s), Frammi við Gjónna (1815), Funningsfjørður (1832), Hellurnar (c. 1850), Hvítanes (c. 1830), Langasandur (1839), Ljósá (1840), Lopra (1834), Morskranes (c. 1830), Nesvík, Norðdepil (1866), Oyrarbakki (1924), Rituvík (1873), Skipanes (1839), Skopun (1830s), Slættanes (1835), Stykkið (1845), Svínáir (1820s), Syðradalur (1812), Tvøroyri (1836), Víkar (1837), and Víkarbyrgi (1830s).

Fossá, Nesvík, Frammi við Gjónna, Slættanes, Víkar, and Víkarbyrgi are no longer inhabited.
