= Syðradalur, Streymoy Island =

Syðradalur
- Village
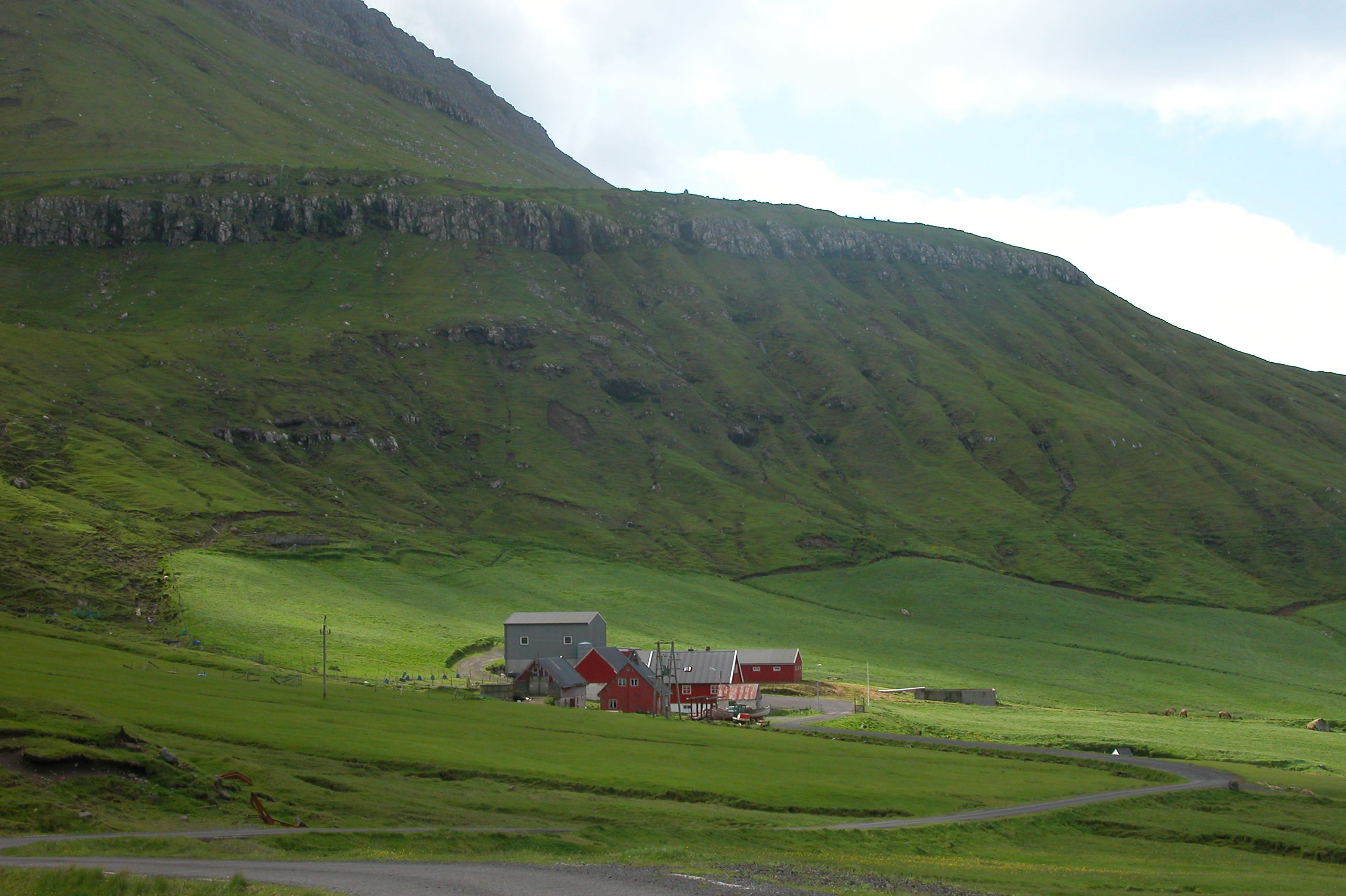
- Syðradalur, Streymoy

- Location in the Faroe Islands
- Coordinates: 62°1′27″N 6°54′36″W
- State: Kingdom of Denmark
- Constituent country: Faroe Islands
- Island: Streymoy
- Municipality: Tórshavn Municipality

Population (1 January 2006)
  - Total: 7
- Time zone: GMT
  - Summer (DST): UTC+1 (EST)
- Postal code: FO 177
- Climate: Cfc

Syðradalur (Danish: Sydredal) is a small village in the Faroe Islands. It is located on the west coast of Streymoy, in Tórshavn Municipality.

Not to be confused with Syðradalur village on Kalsoy, it has a view at the islands Koltur and Vágar.

== See also ==
- List of towns in the Faroe Islands
