= Oyrareingir =

- Village
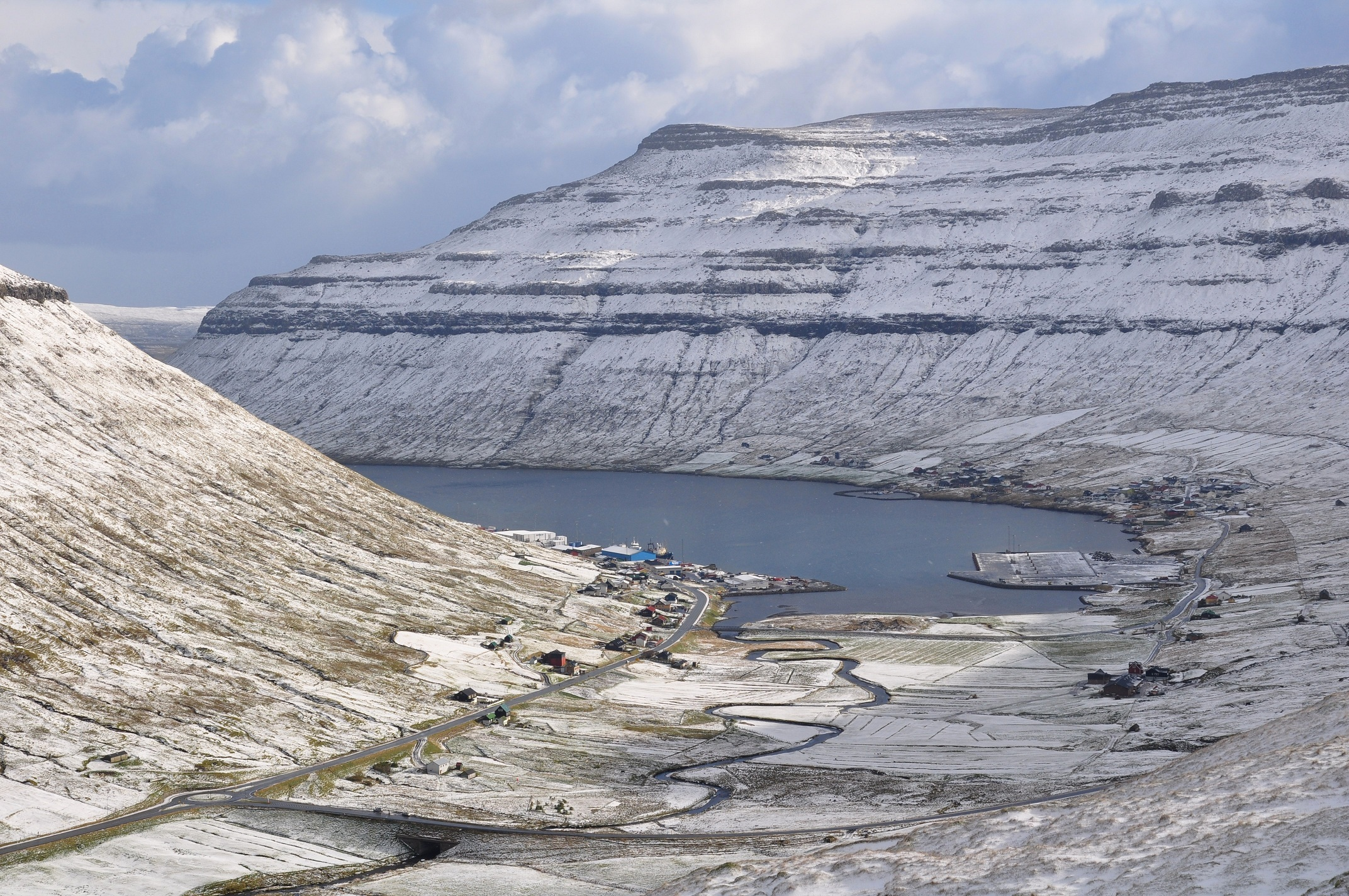
- The villages Signabøur (right) and Kollafjørður (centre) on the shores of the Kollafjørður-fjord. The separate houses in the left and right foreground that do not lie within these villages forms Oyrareingir.

- Location in the Faroe Islands
- Coordinates: 62°6′19″N 6°57′41″W
- State: Kingdom of Denmark
- Constituent country: Faroe Islands
- Island: Streymoy
- Municipality: Tórshavn Municipality

Population (1 January 2006)
  - Total: 45
- Time zone: GMT
  - Summer (DST): UTC+1 (EST)
- Postal code: FO 415
- Climate: ET

Oyrareingir is a village on the Faroese island Streymoy in Tórshavn Municipality.

It is situated at the very head of the Kollafjørður-fjord, on either side of the mouth of the Dalá river. The 2020 population was 45. Its postal code is FO 415. This hamlet is so tiny and its few houses so dispersed among the 'outskirts' of the neighbouring villages of Signabøur and Kollafjørður that few maps mention it. Even the Faroe Islands' best online atlas doesn't. The Faroe Islands' main road (No. 10) from Tórshavn to Klaksvík passes right through Oyrareingir. The only other road -a small one leading to some farms- is called á Oyrareingjum.

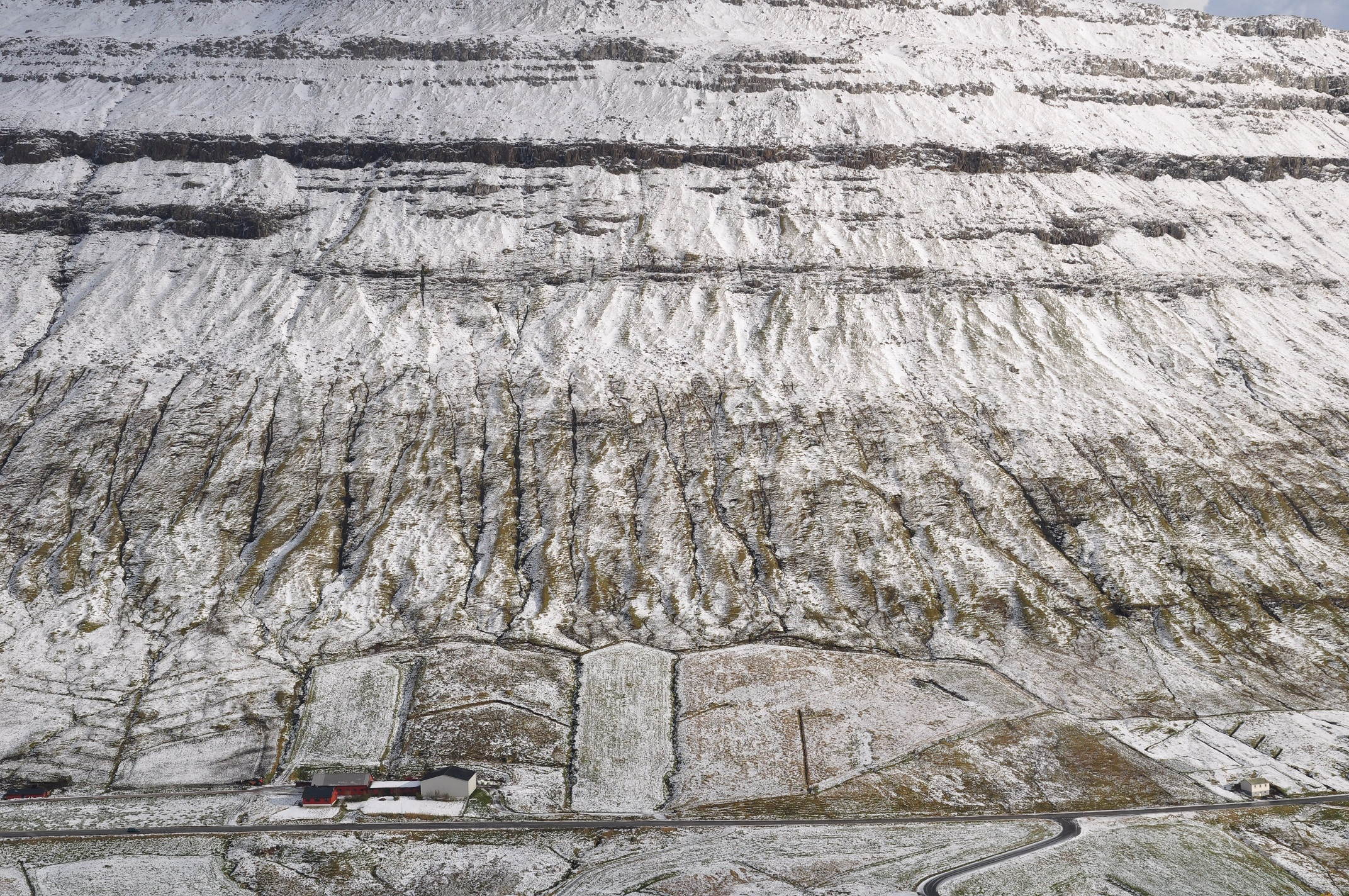
Farm at the foot of a hillside in Oyrareingir

== Population ==
In 2020 the population had 20 Males and 25 Females. The age group of the village was 12 people within the age range of 0–17, 25 people were in the age group of 18–64, and 7 people were 65 or over.

Historical population
Year	Pop.	±%
1985	15	—
1995	21	+40.0%
2005	43	+104.8%
2015	40	−7.0%
2020	45	+12.5%

== See also ==
- List of towns in the Faroe Islands
