= Kaldbaksbotnur =

- Village
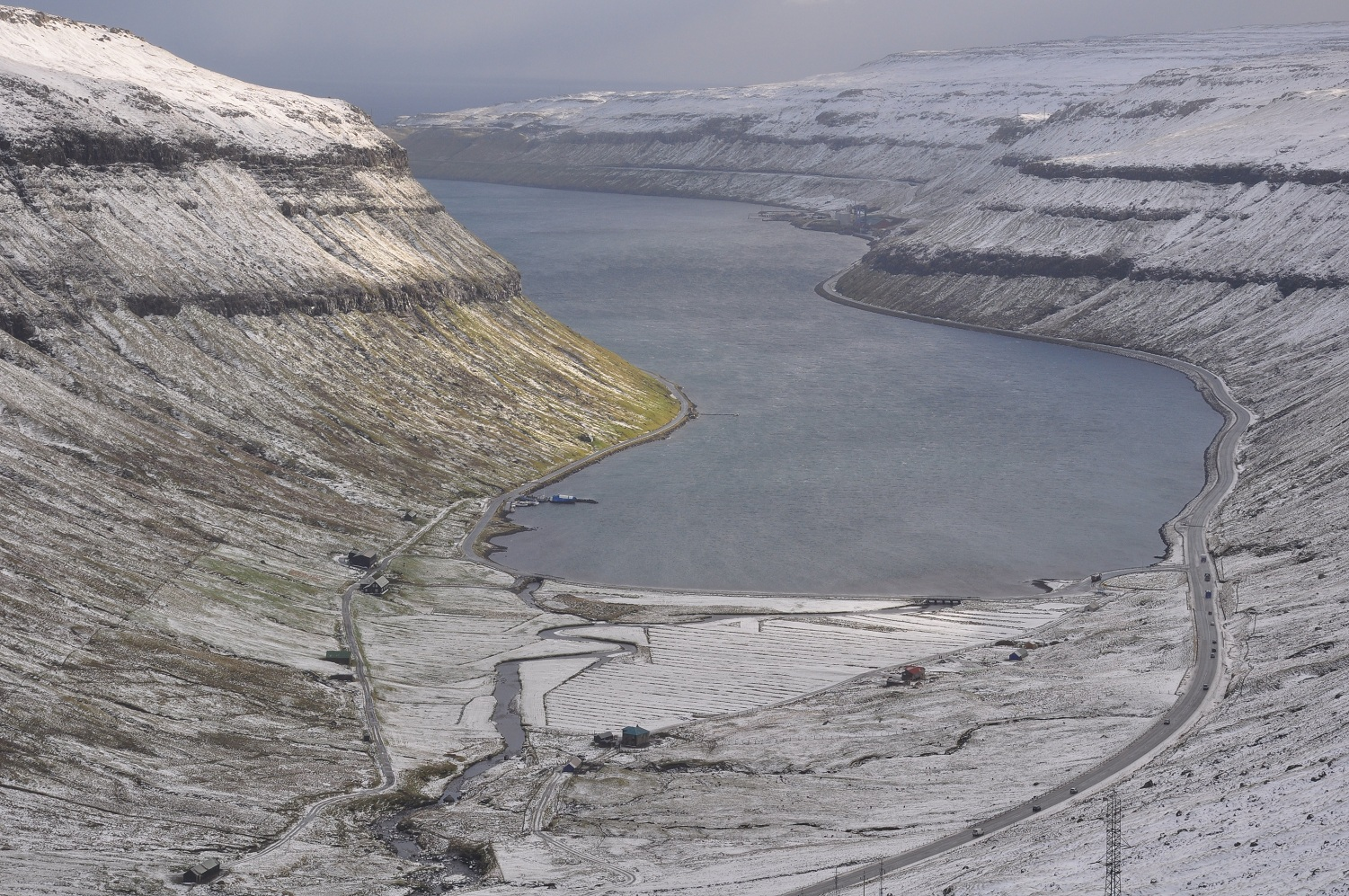
- Kaldbaksbotnur

- Location in the Faroe Islands
- Coordinates: 62°3′58″N 6°54′45″W
- State: Kingdom of Denmark
- Country: Faroe Islands
- Island: Streymoy
- Municipality: Tórshavn Municipality

Population (29 April 2025)
  - Total: 7
- Time zone: GMT
  - Summer (DST): UTC+1 (EST)
- Postal code: FO 185
- Climate: Cfc

Kaldbaksbotnur is a village on the island of Streymoy in the Faroe Islands.

== Geography ==
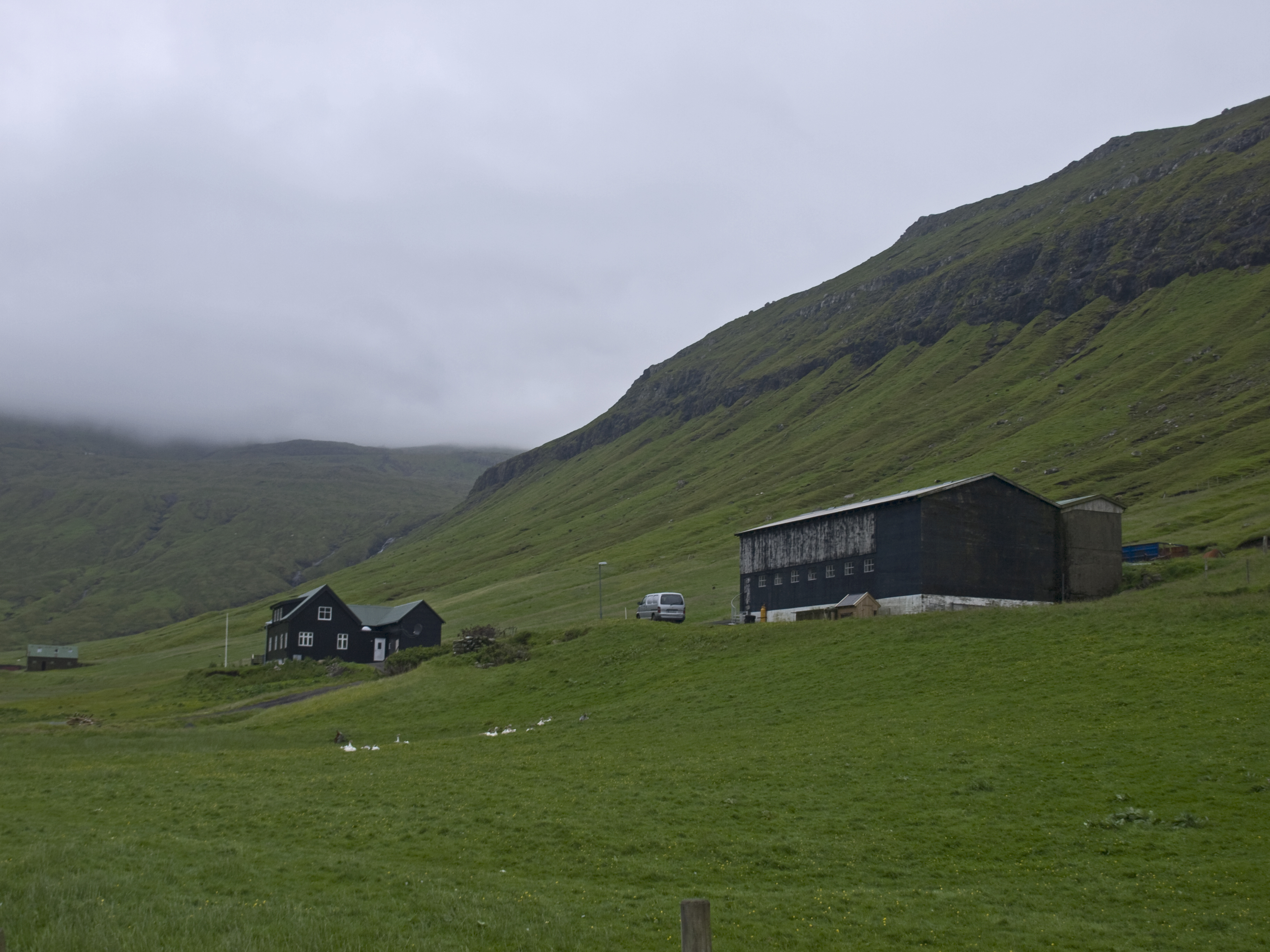
Kaldbaksbotnur, a close-up view

Kaldbaksbotnur is located on the east coast of Streymoy. The village consists two farms. One farm is located in the bottom of Kaldbaksfjørður on the western side of the river and this farm is also called Northern part of Sund. The other is on the eastern side of the river and relates to Kaldbak. When the road to Tórshavn opened in 1980 this connected both Kaldbaksbotnur and Kaldbak to the island's road network.

In 1992 the 2816m tunnel Kollfjarðartunnilin was opened from Kaldbaksbotnur to Kollafjørður and this is now the main route from Tórshavn to the villages in the north of the island.

Throughout the 1990s Kaldbaksbotnur was served by bus route 4 operated by the blue Bygdaleiðir country buses which passed through the village on their route from Tórshavn to Kaldbak. Route 5, added in 2001, also ran from Tórshavn through Kaldbaksbotnur to the township of Kollafjørður. Since 2003, route 4 is running to Kollafjørður, while route 5 is running to Kaldbak. Both operate several times per day.

There is a Danish Navy base in the mountains above Kaldbaksbotnur in a valley called Mjørkadalur (Fog Valley). On the top of the mountains there is a NATO early-warning radar system.

== Geology ==
A sample of stalagmitic white Mordenite (Na_{2}CaK_{2})Al_{2}Si_{10}O_{24}·7H_{2}O) from Kaldbaksbotnur was collected by Volker Betz and can be seen at http://www.mindat.org/photo-177823.html

== Kaldbaksbotnur in music ==
Kaldbaksbotnur is referred to in a song Útsetin performed by Teitur Lassen on his 2007 album Káta Hornið. It is performed in the Faroese language but the extract below (the 3rd and 4th verses out of eight) includes an English translation:

eg vendi aftur til ódnarveður
vánaligar fløguútgávur
eina árliga blokering
av Kaldbaksbotni

hampafólk í samkomu
sum eru útbúgvin í bíbliu
men rodna tá eg syngi
um samkynd og nekarar

Translation:

I return to stormy weather
bad album releases
an annual blockade
of Kaldbaksbotnur

decent folk in congregations
who have Bible educations
but blush when I sing
about gays and negros

== See also ==
- List of towns in the Faroe Islands
