= Towns of the Faroe Islands =

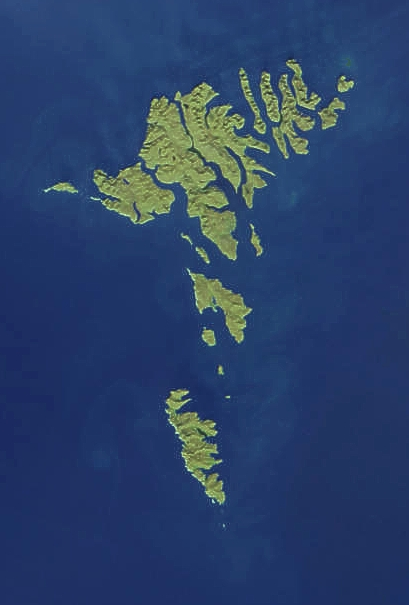
Faroe Islands NASA satellite image.

This is a list of villages (and towns) and their population in the Faroe Islands as of January 2026.

Population	Faroese name	Postal Code	Municipality	Island	Location
11	Akrar	FO 927	Sumba	Suðuroy	61°27′20″N 6°45′33″W
2615	Argir	FO 160	Tórshavn	Streymoy	61°59′53″N 6°46′23″W
57	Ánirnar	FO 726	Klaksvík	Borðoy	62°15′23″N 6°34′40″W
66	Árnafjørður	FO 727	Klaksvík	Borðoy	62°15′21″N 6°32′3″W
72	Bøur	FO 386	Sørvágur	Vágar	62°5′27″N 7°22′3″W
38	Dalur	FO 235	Húsavík	Sandoy	61°46′56″N 6°40′32″W
5	Depil	FO 735	Hvannasund	Borðoy	62°17′10″N 6°31′39″W
692	Eiði	FO 470	Eiði	Eysturoy	62°18′1″N 7°5′20″W
12	Elduvík	FO 478	Runavík	Eysturoy	62°16′57″N 6°54′35″W
73	Fámjin	FO 870	Fámjin	Suðuroy	61°31′35″N 6°52′37″W
255	Froðba	FO 825	Tvøroyri	Suðuroy	61°32′53″N 6°46′20″W
1630	Fuglafjørður	FO 530	Fuglafjørður	Eysturoy	62°14′40″N 6°48′52″W
61	Funningsfjørður	FO 477	Runavík	Eysturoy	62°14′17″N 6°55′44″W
41	Funningur	FO 475	Runavík	Eysturoy	62°17′17″N 6°58′2″W
15	Gásadalur	FO 387	Sørvágur	Vágar	62°6′44″N 7°26′5″W
19	Gjógv	FO 476	Sunda	Eysturoy	62°19′30″N 6°56′28″W
480	Glyvrar	FO 625	Runavík	Eysturoy	62°7′53″N 6°43′27″W
51	Gøtugjógv	FO 511	Eystur	Eysturoy	62°11′25″N 6°44′47″W
119	Haldórsvík	FO 440	Sunda	Streymoy	62°16′37″N 7°5′25″W
64	Haraldssund	FO 785	Kunoy	Kunoy	62°16′20″N 6°36′7″W
18	Hattarvík	FO 767	Fugloy	Fugloy	62°19′51″N 6°16′25″W
10	Hellurnar	FO 695	Fuglafjørður	Eysturoy	62°15′49″N 6°50′40″W
14	Hestur	FO 280	Tórshavn	Hestur	61°57′27″N 6°53′13″W
105	Hov	FO 960	Hov	Suðuroy	61°30′30″N 6°45′29″W
4702	Hoyvík	FO 188	Tórshavn	Streymoy	62°1′32″N 6°45′32″W
319	Hósvík	FO 420	Sunda	Streymoy	62°9′17″N 6°56′25″W
43	Húsar	FO 796	Klaksvík	Kalsoy	62°15′54″N 6°40′53″W
65	Húsavík	FO 230	Húsavík	Sandoy	61°48′38″N 6°40′35″W
566	Hvalba	FO 850	Hvalba	Suðuroy	61°36′7″N 6°56′58″W
256	Hvalvík	FO 430	Sunda	Streymoy	62°11′23″N 7°1′51″W
271	Hvannasund	FO 740	Hvannasund	Viðoy	62°17′43″N 6°30′58″W
106	Hvítanes	FO 187	Tórshavn	Streymoy	62°2′48″N 6°46′10″W
79	Innan Glyvur	FO 494	Sjóvar	Eysturoy	62°8′21″N 6°45′24″W
249	Kaldbak	FO 180	Tórshavn	Streymoy	62°3′47″N 6°49′34″W
7	Kaldbaksbotnur	FO 185	Tórshavn	Streymoy	62°3′58″N 6°54′45″W
30	Kirkja	FO 766	Fugloy	Fugloy	62°19′10″N 6°18′51″W
71	Kirkjubøur	FO 175	Tórshavn	Streymoy	61°57′22″N 6°47′37″W
5142	Klaksvík	FO 700	Klaksvík	Borðoy	62°13′26″N 6°34′43″W
29	Kolbeinagjógv	FO 495	Sjóvar	Eysturoy	62°6′30″N 6°47′6″W
822	Kollafjørður	FO 410	Tórshavn	Streymoy	62°7′6″N 6°54′20″W
0	Koltur	FO 285	Tórshavn	Koltur	61°59′13″N 6°57′53″W
81	Kunoy	FO 780	Kunoy	Kunoy	62°17′37″N 6°40′2″W
385	Kvívík	FO 340	Kvívík	Streymoy	62°7′14″N 7°4′4″W
149	Lamba	FO 627	Runavík	Eysturoy	62°8′33″N 6°42′8″W
12	Lambareiði	FO 626	Runavík	Eysturoy	62°8′31″N 6°43′44″W
40	Langasandur	FO 438	Sunda	Streymoy	62°14′14″N 7°3′13″W
1036	Leirvík	FO 520	Eystur	Eysturoy	62°12′40″N 6°42′22″W
121	Leynar	FO 335	Kvívík	Streymoy	62°6′58″N 7°2′22″W
34	Ljósá	FO 466	Eiði	Eysturoy	62°16′6″N 7°3′1″W
80	Lopra	FO 926	Sumba	Suðuroy	61°26′40″N 6°46′8″W
1139	Miðvágur	FO 370	Vágar	Vágar	62°3′4″N 7°11′38″W
29	Mikladalur	FO 797	Klaksvík	Kalsoy	62°20′9″N 6°45′50″W
0	Mjørkadalur		Tórshavn	Streymoy	62°3′0″N 6°58′0″W
20	Morskranes	FO 496	Sjóvar	Eysturoy	62°7′59″N 6°50′31″W
0	Múli	FO 737	Hvannasund	Borðoy	62°21′10″N 6°34′47″W
13	Mykines	FO 388	Sørvágur	Mykines	62°6′15″N 7°38′46″W
369	Nes, Eysturoy	FO 655	Nes	Eysturoy	62°4′47″N 6°43′28″W
0	Nesvík	FO 437	Sunda	Streymoy	62°12′35″N 7°0′30″W
220	Nólsoy	FO 270	Tórshavn	Nólsoy	62°0′33″N 6°40′7″W
149	Norðdepil	FO 730	Hvannasund	Borðoy	62°17′51″N 6°31′32″W
152	Norðoyri	FO 725	Klaksvík	Borðoy	62°12′50″N 6°32′27″W
9	Norðradalur	FO 178	Tórshavn	Streymoy	62°2′25″N 6°55′22″W
650	Norðragøta	FO 512	Eystur	Eysturoy	62°12′3″N 6°44′27″W
312	Norðskáli	FO 460	Sunda	Eysturoy	62°12′47″N 6°59′59″W
1	Norðtoftir	FO 736	Hvannasund	Borðoy	62°16′38″N 6°30′49″W
128	Oyndarfjørður	FO 690	Runavík	Eysturoy	62°16′40″N 6°51′4″W
157	Oyrarbakki	FO 400	Sunda	Eysturoy	62°12′5″N 6°59′40″W
39	Oyrareingir	FO 415	Tórshavn	Streymoy	62°6′19″N 6°57′41″W
183	Oyri	FO 450	Sunda	Eysturoy	62°11′26″N 6°58′24″W
324	Porkeri	FO 950	Porkeri	Suðuroy	61°28′59″N 6°44′36″W
348	Rituvík	FO 640	Runavík	Eysturoy	62°6′25″N 6°40′58″W
561	Runavík	FO 620	Runavík	Eysturoy	62°6′34″N 6°43′9″W
13	Saksun	FO 436	Sunda	Streymoy	62°14′56″N 7°10′33″W
1246	Saltangará	FO 600	Runavík	Eysturoy	62°7′3″N 6°43′7″W
163	Saltnes	FO 656	Nes	Eysturoy	62°6′19″N 6°44′22″W
1005	Sandavágur	FO 360	Vágur	Vágar	62°3′24″N 7°9′15″W
543	Sandur	FO 210	Sandur	Sandoy	61°50′10″N 6°48′38″W
65	Sandvík	FO 860	Hvalba	Suðuroy	61°38′16″N 6°55′19″W
37	Selatrað	FO 497	Sjóvar	Eysturoy	62°9′31″N 6°52′41″W
151	Signabøur	FO 416	Tórshavn	Streymoy	62°5′48″N 6°55′43″W
9	Skarvanes	FO 236	Húsavík	Sandoy	61°47′35″N 6°44′13″W
781	Skála	FO 480	Runavík	Eysturoy	62°9′44″N 6°46′57″W
131	Skálafjørður/Skálabotnur	FO 485	Runavík	Eysturoy	62°11′52″N 6°50′59″W
5	Skálafjørður (eysturkommuna)	FO 485	Eystur	Eysturoy	62°11′52″N 6°50′59″W
171	Skálavík	FO 220	Skálavík	Sandoy	61°50′1″N 6°39′33″W
58	Skipanes	FO 665	Runavík	Eysturoy	62°10′6″N 6°45′40″W
488	Skopun	FO 240	Skopun	Sandoy	61°54′11″N 6°52′29″W
30	Skúgvoy	FO 260	Skúvoy	Skúvoy	61°46′27″N 6°48′17″W
13	Skælingur	FO 336	Kvívík	Streymoy	62°5′45″N 7°0′24″W
5	Stóra Dímun	FO 286	Skúvoy	Stóra Dímun	61°41′50″N 6°45′5″W
1120	Strendur	FO 490	Sjóvar	Eysturoy	62°6′46″N 6°45′23″W
324	Streymnes	FO 435	Sunda	Streymoy	62°11′35″N 7°1′54″W
40	Stykkið	FO 330	Kvívík	Streymoy	62°7′0″N 7°2′52″W
242	Sumba	FO 970	Sumba	Suðuroy	61°24′21″N 6°42′19″W
1	Sund	FO 186	Tórshavn	Streymoy	62°2′59″N 6°50′46″W
41	Svínáir	FO 465	Eiði	Eysturoy	62°13′46″N 7°1′25″W
30	Svínoy	FO 765	Klaksvík	Svínoy	62°16′47″N 6°20′55″W
9	Syðradalur, Kalsoy	FO 795	Klaksvík	Kalsoy	62°14′46″N 6°39′48″W
8	Syðradalur, Streymoy	FO 177	Tórshavn	Streymoy	62°1′27″N 6°54′36″W
514	Syðrugøta	FO 513	Eystur	Eysturoy	62°11′12″N 6°45′12″W
343	Søldarfjørður	FO 660	Runavík	Eysturoy	62°9′35″N 6°45′4″W
1157	Sørvágur	FO 380	Sørvágur	Vágar	62°4′28″N 7°18′34″W
45	Tjørnuvík	FO 445	Sunda	Streymoy	62°17′17″N 7°8′27″W
1087	Toftir	FO 650	Nes	Eysturoy	62°5′20″N 6°44′8″W
14242	Tórshavn	FO 100	Tórshavn	Streymoy	62°0′42″N 6°46′3″W
523	Trongisvágur	FO 826	Tvøroyri	Suðuroy	61°33′50″N 6°50′40″W
14	Trøllanes	FO 798	Klaksvík	Kalsoy	62°21′43″N 6°47′18″W
849	Tvøroyri	FO 800	Tvøroyri	Suðuroy	61°33′21″N 6°48′12″W
30	Undir Gøtueiði	FO 666	Eystur	Eysturoy	62°10′30″N 6°46′19″W
44	Vatnsoyrar	FO 385	Vágar	Vágar	62°4′27″N 7°14′53″W
1326	Vágur	FO 900	Vágur	Suðuroy	61°28′31″N 6°48′26″W
43	Válur	FO 358	Kvívík	Streymoy	62°09′22″N 7°09′59″W
263	Velbastaður	FO 176	Tórshavn	Streymoy	61°59′5″N 6°51′2″W
1256	Vestmanna	FO 350	Vestmanna	Streymoy	62°9′23″N 7°9′59″W
329	Viðareiði	FO 750	Viðareiði	Viðoy	62°21′35″N 6°31′58″W
0	Víkarbyrgi	FO 928	Sumba	Suðuroy	61°24′21″N 6°42′19″W
93	Æðuvík	FO 645	Runavík	Eysturoy	62°4′11″N 6°41′24″W
25	Ørðavík/Øravík	FO 827	Tvøroyri	Suðuroy	61°32′10″N 6°48′31″W
48	Øravíkarlíð	FO 826/7	Tvøroyri	Suðuroy	61°33′N 6°50′W
