= Líðin =

Líðin may refer to:

- Øravíkarlíð, place in Denmark
- Lithium (medication), lithium medication
