= Valur =

Valur may refer to:

== People ==
- Birkir Valur Jónsson (born 1998), Icelandic football player
- Björn Valur Gíslason (born 1959), Icelandic politician
- Guðjón Valur Sigurðsson (born 1979), Icelandic handball player
- Guðni Valur Guðnason (born 1995), Icelandic discus thrower
- Kristján Valur Ingólfsson (born 1947), Icelandic priest
- Valur Gíslason (born 1977), Icelandic football player
- Valur Ingimundarson (born 1962), Icelandic basketball player and coach
- Valur Orri Valsson (born 1994), Icelandic basketball player
- Valur Valsson (born 1961), Icelandic football player

== Places ==
- Válur, Faroe Islands

== Sports ==
- Valur (club), an Icelandic multi-sport club
  - Valur (men's football)
  - Valur (women's football)
  - Valur (men's handball)
  - Valur (women's handball)
  - Valur (men's basketball)
  - Valur (women's basketball)
- Valur Reyðarfirði, a defunct club that merged into Knattspyrnufélag Fjarðabyggðar
