= Sund, Faroe Islands =

Sund
- Village
- Location in the Faroe Islands
- Coordinates: 62°02′59″N 6°50′46″W
- State: Kingdom of Denmark
- Constituent country: Faroe Islands
- Island: Streymoy
- Municipality: Tórshavn Municipality

Population (2020)
  - Total: 1
- Time zone: GMT
  - Summer (DST): UTC+1 (EST)
- Postal code: FO 186
- Climate: Cfc

Sund is a small village in the Faroe Islands, located north of Tórshavn. It has the largest powerstation in the country.

Currently (2023), it has a population of only 1 person.

== See also ==
- List of towns in the Faroe Islands
