= Norðradalur =

- Village
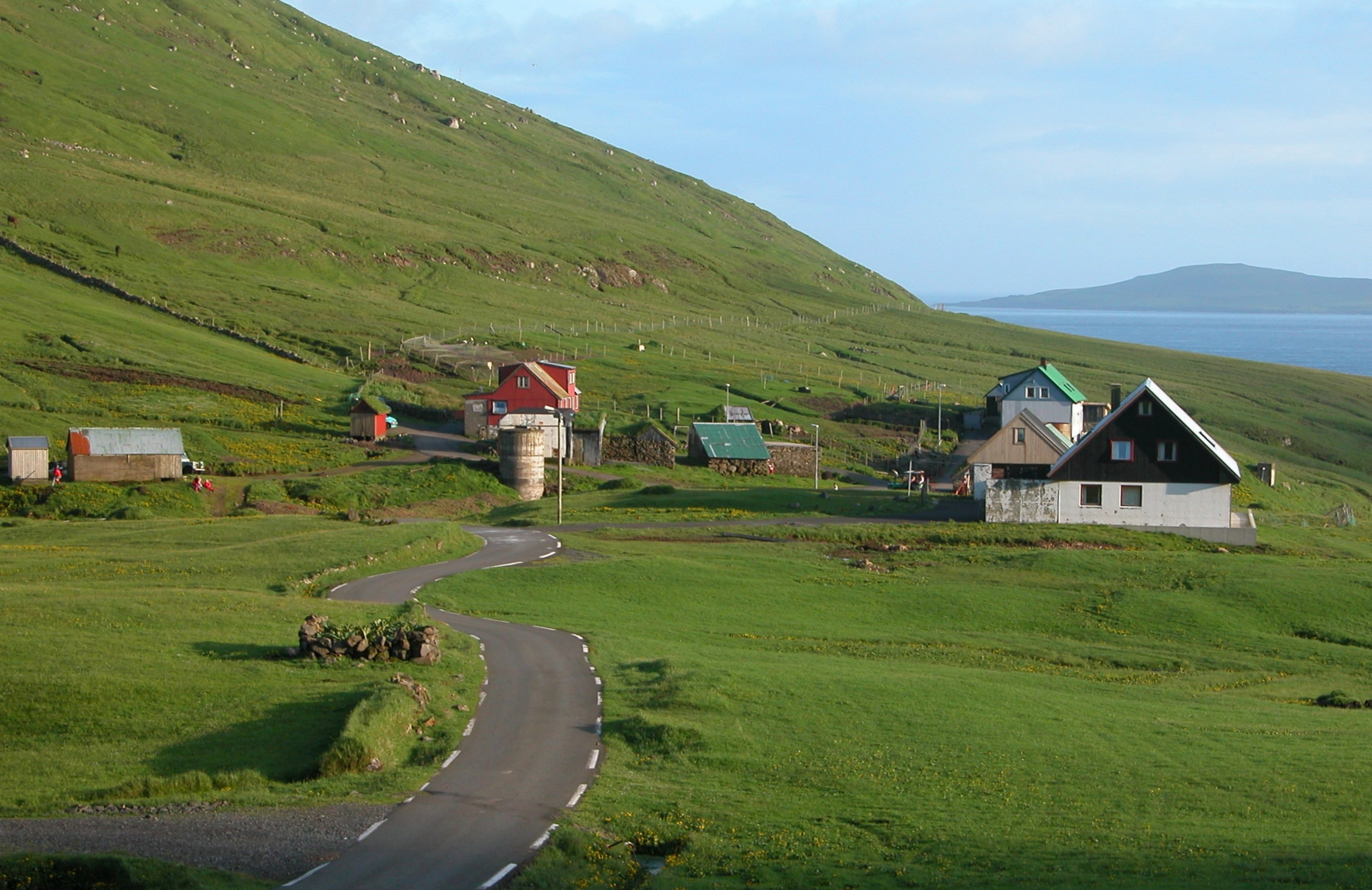
- Norðradalur, Faroe Islands

- Location in the Faroe Islands
- Coordinates: 62°2′25″N 6°55′22″W
- State: Kingdom of Denmark
- Constituent country: Faroe Islands
- Island: Streymoy
- Municipality: Tórshavn Municipality

Population (1 January 2006)
  - Total: 15
- Time zone: GMT
  - Summer (DST): UTC+1 (EST)
- Postal code: FO 178

Norðradalur (Danish: Nordredal) is a village on the western coast of the Faroese island of Streymoy in Tórshavn Municipality. The 2015 population was 15. Its postal code is FO 178. The village lies in a large valley surrounded be steep cliffs and the ocean, with views over Koltur.

Norðradalur has a columnar basalt wall, which is used as the main climbing area for the young, but growing Faroese climbing community.

== See also ==
- List of towns in the Faroe Islands
