= Stykkið =

- Village
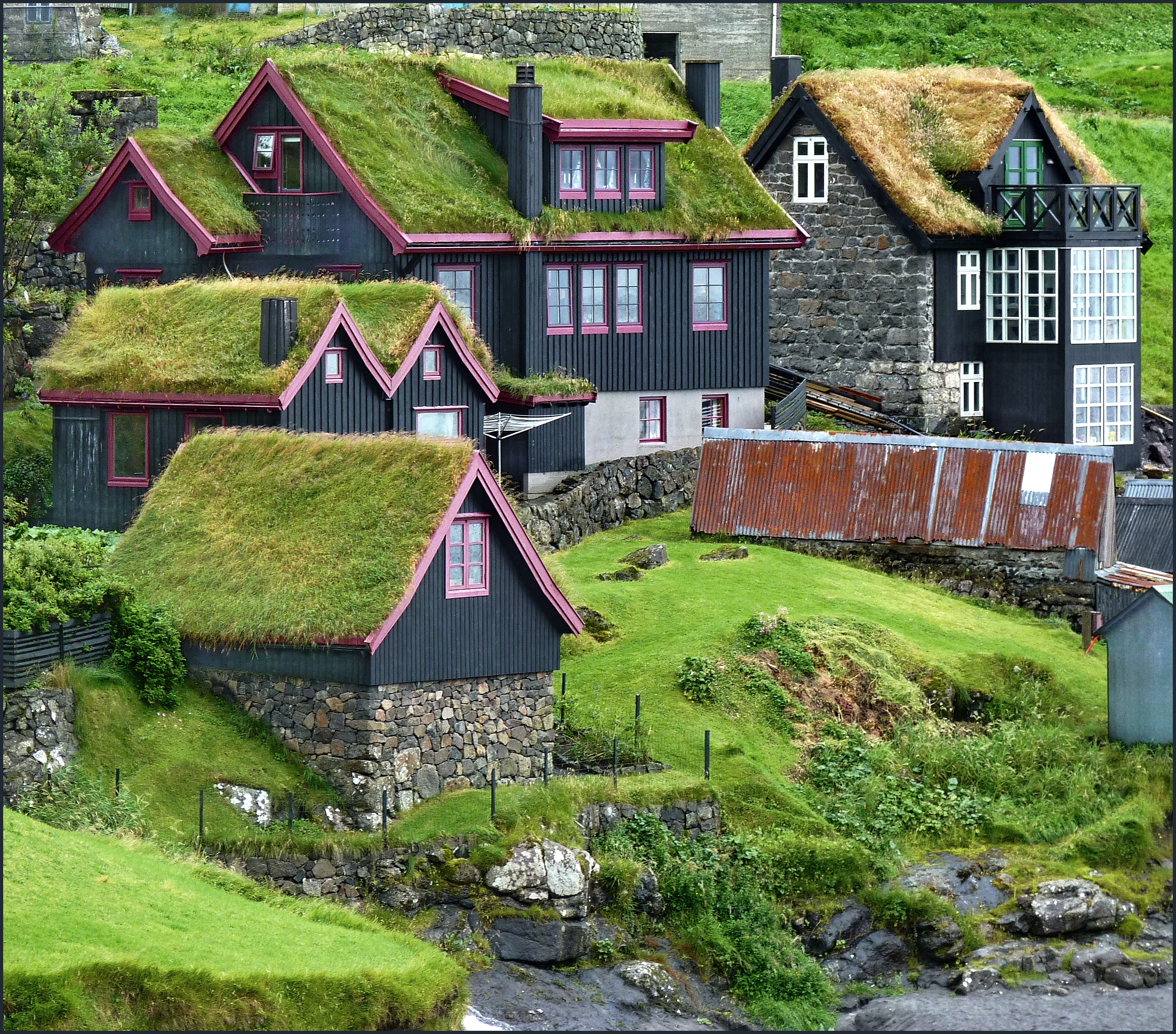

- Location in the Faroe Islands
- Coordinates: 62°7′0″N 7°2′52″W
- State: Kingdom of Denmark
- Constituent country: Faroe Islands
- Island: Streymoy
- Municipality: Kvívík Municipality
- Founded: 1845

Population (September 2025)
  - Total: 40
- Time zone: GMT
  - Summer (DST): UTC+1 (EST)
- Postal code: FO 330
- Climate: Cfc

Stykkið (Danish: Stykket) is a village on the west coast of the Faroese island Streymoy in Kvívík Municipality.

Founded in 1845, its postal code is FO 330. Its 2005 population was 42.

== See also ==
- List of towns in the Faroe Islands
