= Hvítanes =

Hvítanes Hvidenæs
- Village
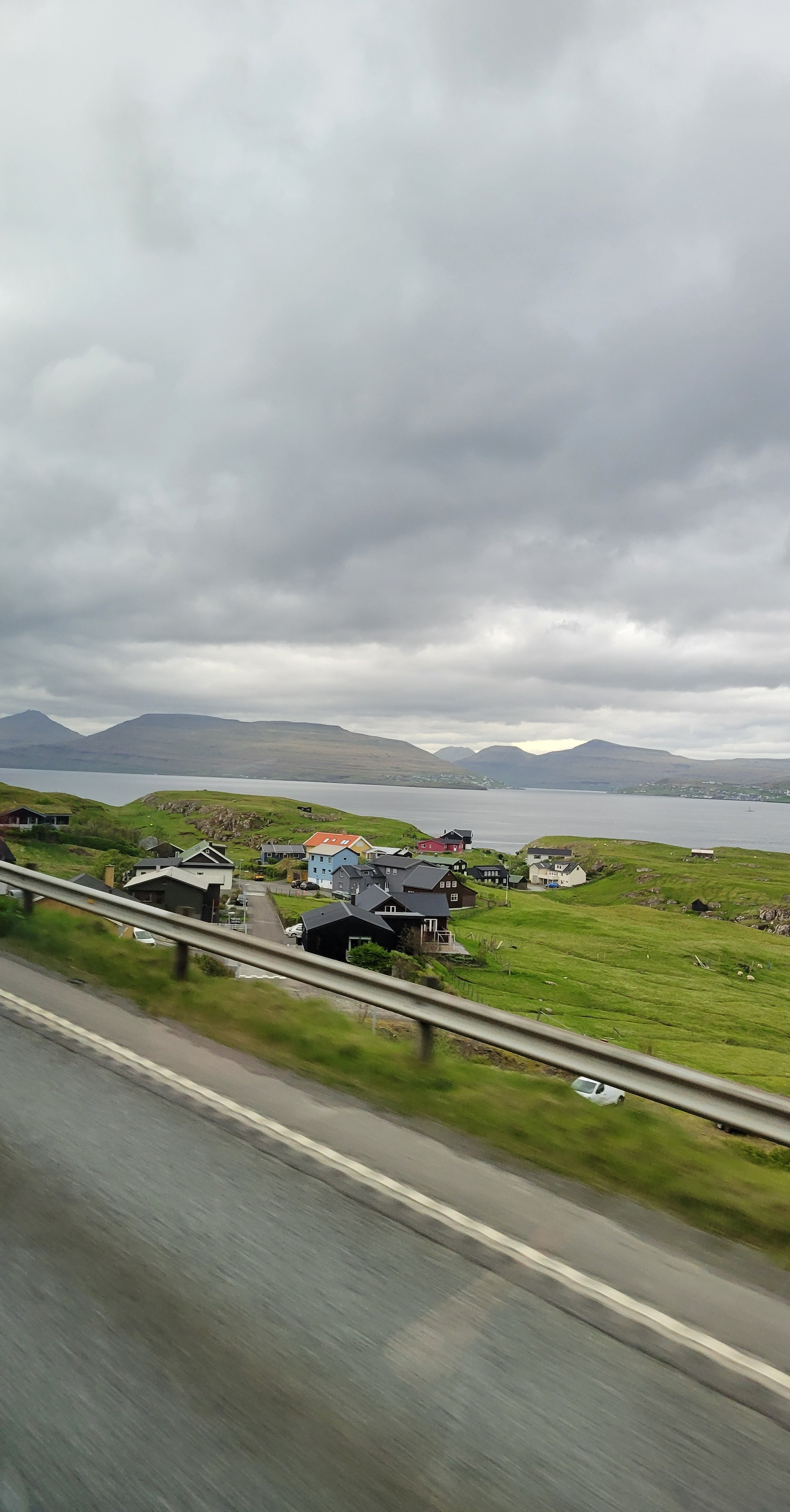
- Hvítanes, Faroe Islands

- Location in the Faroe Islands
- Coordinates: 62°02′48″N 6°46′10″W
- State: Kingdom of Denmark
- Constituent country: Faroe Islands
- Island: Streymoy
- Municipality: Tórshavn Municipality
- Founded: 1837

Population (September 2025)
  - Total: 108
- Time zone: GMT
  - Summer (DST): UTC+1 (EST)
- Postal code: FO 187
- Climate: Cfc

Hvítanes (Danish: Hvidenæs) is a village in the Faroe Islands. It is on Streymoy's east coast, northeast of Hoyvík and Tórshavn. Its name means "White Point" in Faroese.

Hvítanes is located in a little bay with a stone beach and a harbour where the small boats can be pulled up a ramp out of reach of the sometimes destructive sea.

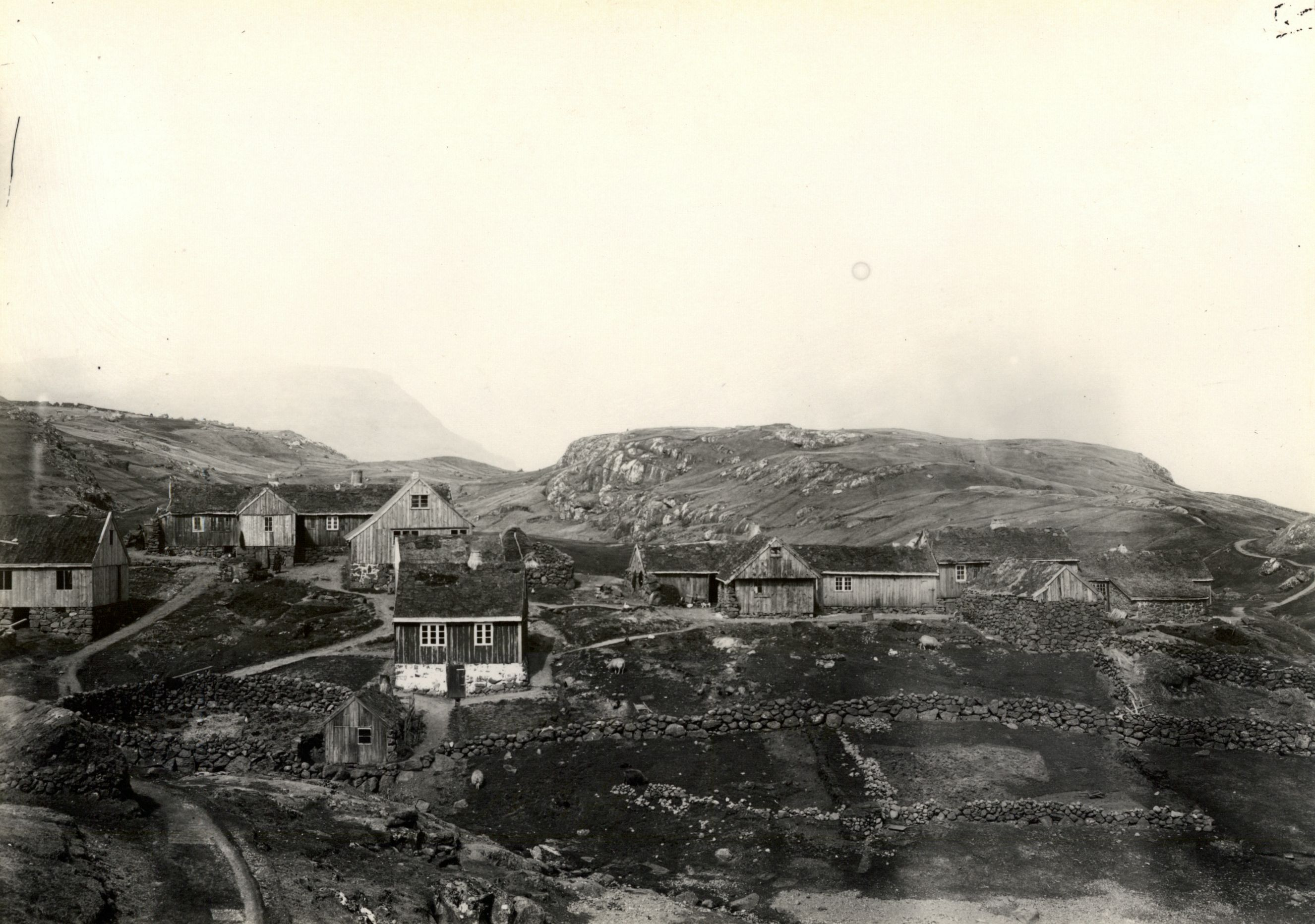
Hvitanes in 1899

It was founded in 1837.

The Eysturoyartunnilin surfaces near Hvítanes and connects Tórshavn with the Skálafjørður on Eysturoy.

== See also ==
- List of towns in the Faroe Islands
