= Leynar =

- Village
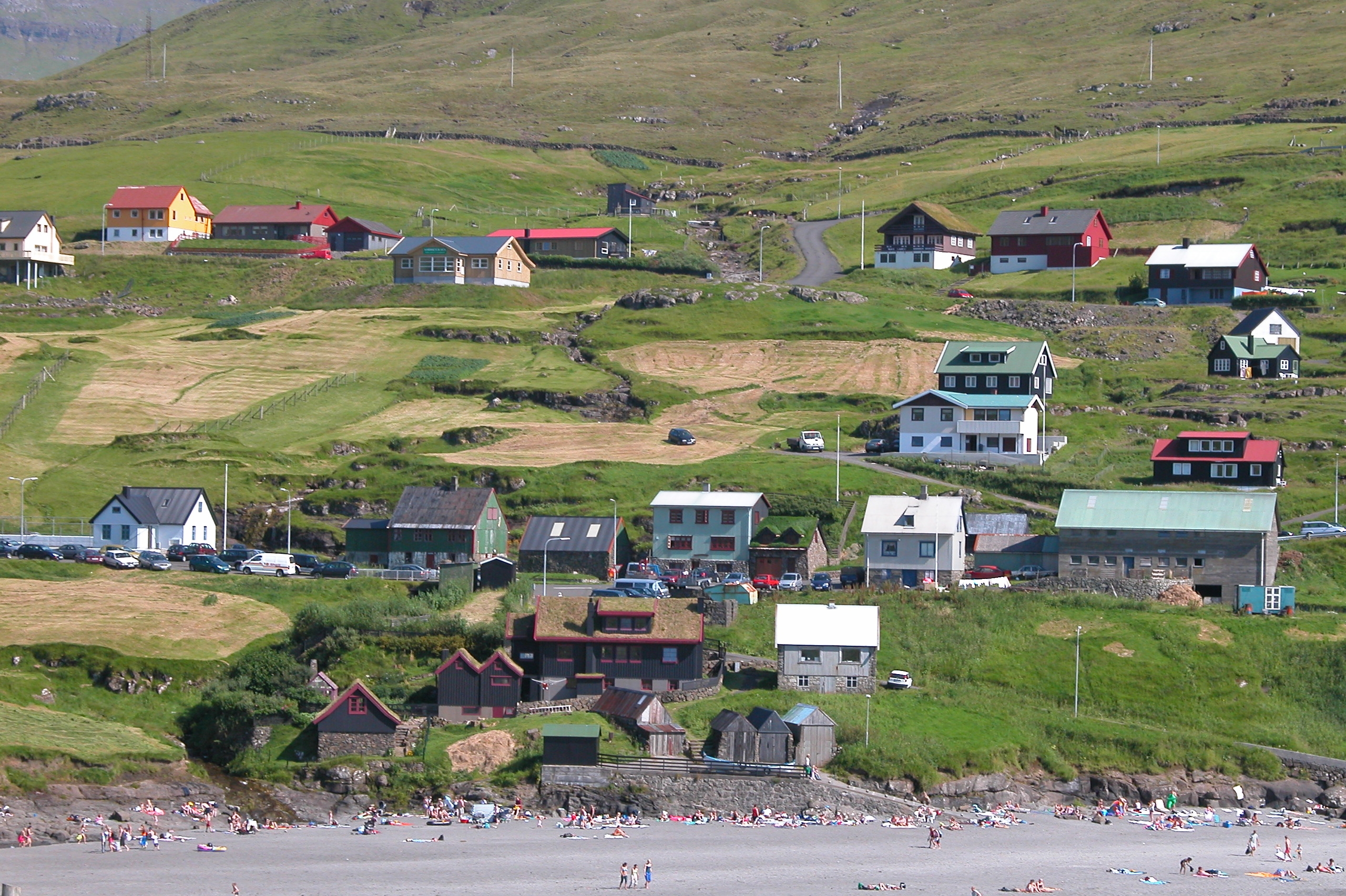
- Leynar

- Location in the Faroe Islands
- Coordinates: 62°6′58″N 7°02′21″W
- State: Kingdom of Denmark
- Constituent country: Faroe Islands
- Island: Streymoy
- Municipality: Kvívíkar kommuna

Population (September 2025)
  - Total: 120
- Time zone: GMT
  - Summer (DST): UTC+1 (EST)
- Postal code: FO 335
- Climate: Cfc

Leynar (Danish: Leinum) is a village in the Faroe Islands, a self-governing overseas administrative division of Denmark.

The village is situated on the western coast of the island of Streymoy in the municipality of Kvívíkar. Leynar is the birthplace of Faroese actor Sverri Egholm (1930–2001) and domicile of the poet Guðrið Helmsdal.

== See also ==
- List of towns in the Faroe Islands
