= Válur =

- Village
- Location in the Faroe Islands
- Coordinates: 62°9′22″N 7°09′59″W
- State: Kingdom of Denmark
- Constituent country: Faroe Islands
- Island: Streymoy
- Municipality: Kvívík Municipality

Population (September 2025)
  - Total: 44
- Time zone: GMT
  - Summer (DST): UTC+1 (EST)
- Postal code: FO 358
- Climate: Cfc

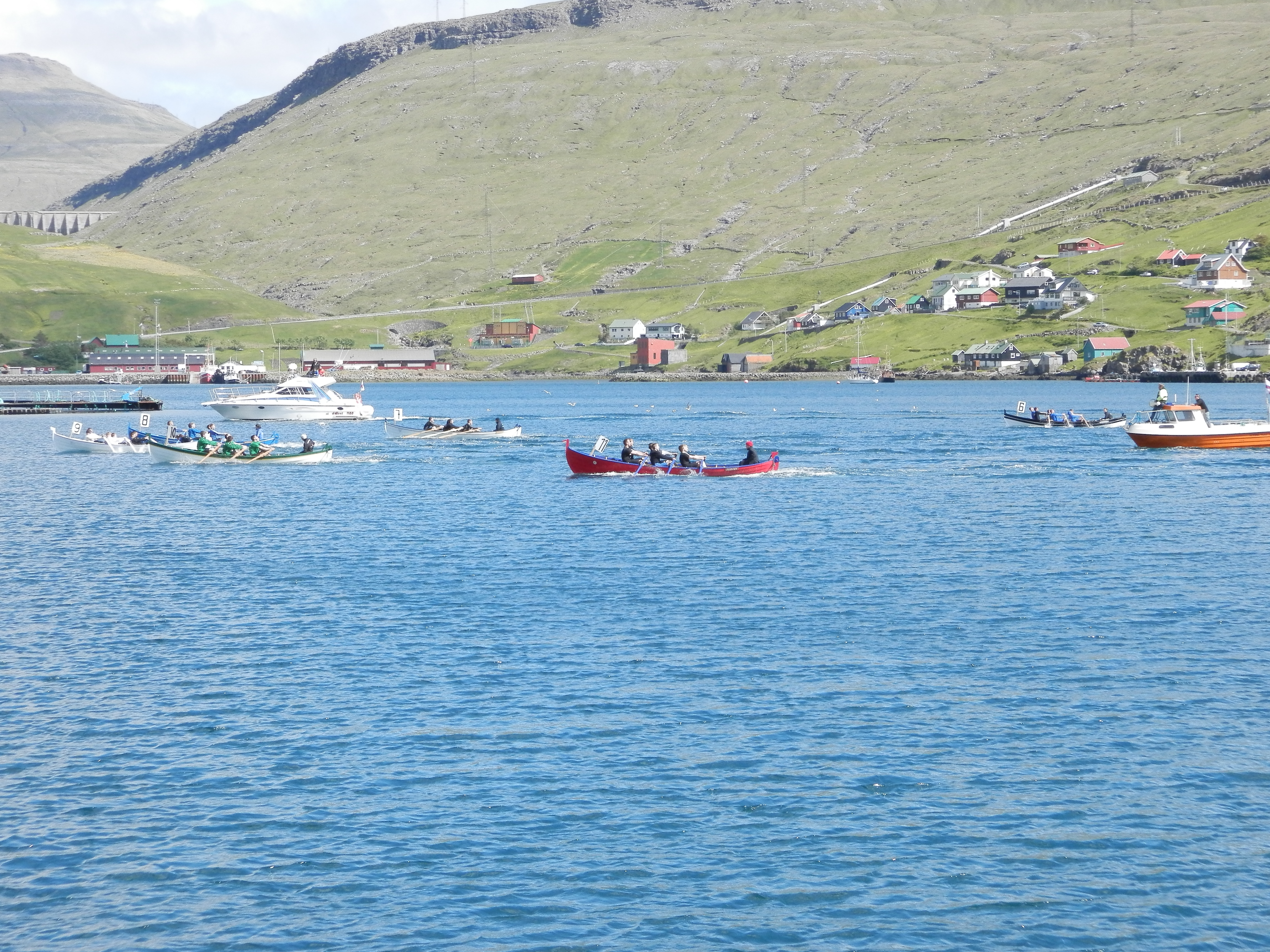
A Faroese rowing competition (Kappróður) during Fjarðastevna in the village of Vestmanna on the west coast of Streymoy, featuring the 5-man boat (5mannafør) category for boys under 18 in 2012

Válur (Danish: Vålen) is a village on the Faroese island of Streymoy located in Kvívík Municipality. Its population is 49 (2015). Its postal code is FO 358.

== See also ==
- List of towns in the Faroe Islands
