= Signabøur =

- Village
- Location in the Faroe Islands
- Coordinates: 62°5′48″N 6°55′43″W
- State: Kingdom of Denmark
- Constituent country: Faroe Islands
- Island: Streymoy
- Municipality: Tórshavn Municipality

Population (September 2025)
  - Total: 149
- Time zone: GMT
  - Summer (DST): UTC+1 (EST)
- Postal code: FO 416
- Climate: ET

Signabøur (Danish: Signebø) is a village on the east coast of the Faroese island Streymoy in Tórshavn Municipality.

The 2015 population was 133. Its postal code is FO 416.

== Whaling station ==
In 1903 Hans Albert Grøn built the whaling station Verdande in Signabø. Verdande was originally an old company which had tried for whales in Finnmark, Norway. Grøn had planned for some time to start the company up for whaling in Shetland, but for some reason the company ended at Signabø in Kollafirði.

For whaling, the company overtook two whaling boats, Nordkap and Nordkyn from Grøn's company in the Finnmark, and were renamed Dimon and Kolter.

The boats Dimon (1903-1912), Kolter (1903-1912), Hvalen (1908-1911) and Skjold (1909) were attached to the station.

One of the boats was rammed by a wounded whale in 1907 and nearly sank, but it was managed to tow it back to Signabø for repairs.

The station closed down in 1912.

Verdande was sold in 1920, the material from the station went to build several new houses in Kollafirði.

== See also ==
- List of towns in the Faroe Islands
- Tórshavn Municipality
