= Kaldbak =

- Village
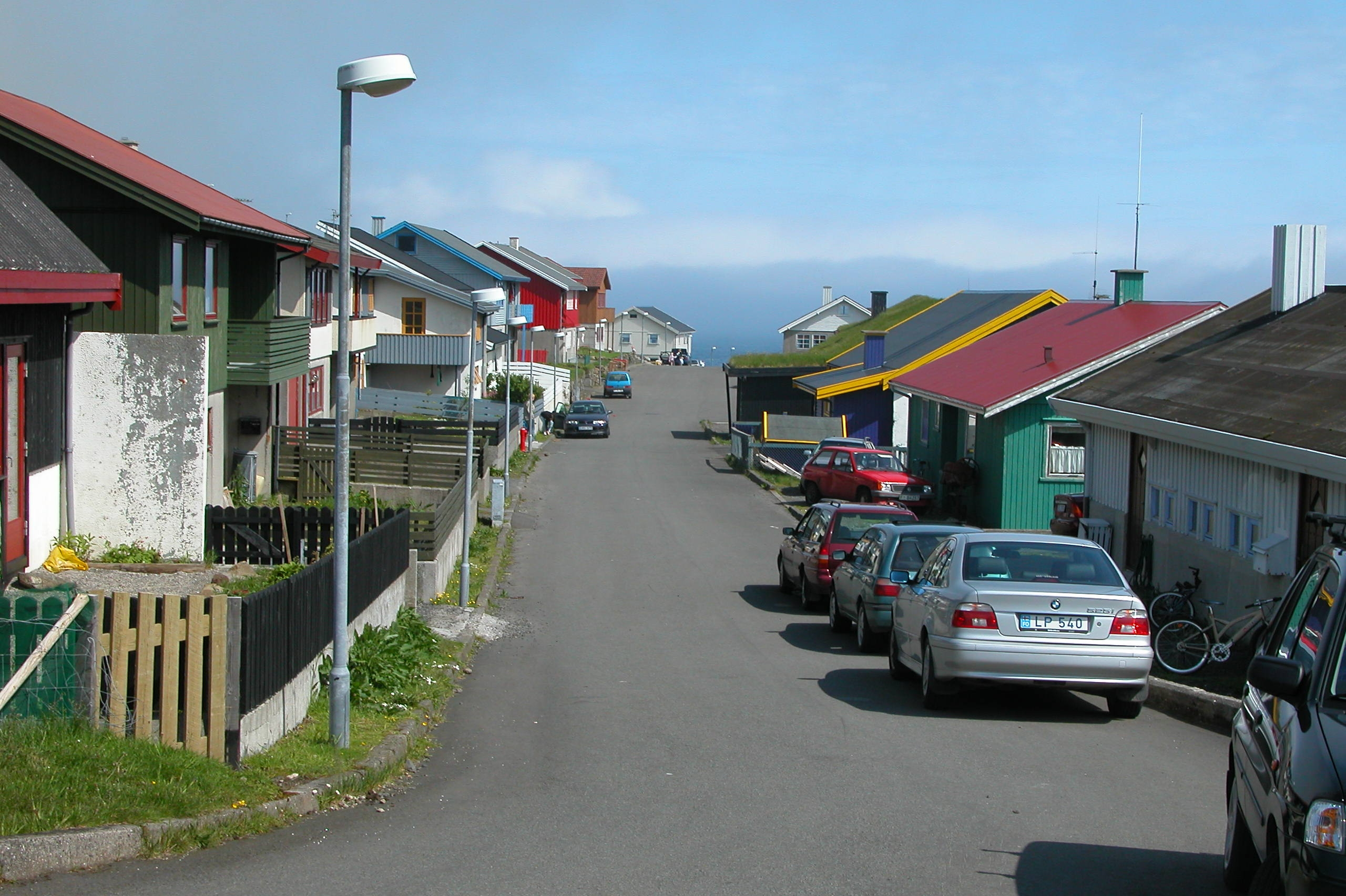
- Kaldbak, Faroe Islands

- Location in the Faroe Islands
- Coordinates: 62°3′47″N 6°49′34″W
- State: Kingdom of Denmark
- Constituent country: Faroe Islands
- Island: Streymoy
- Municipality: Tórshavn Municipality

Population (September 2025)
  - Total: 248
- Time zone: GMT
  - Summer (DST): UTC+1 (EST)
- Postal code: FO 180
- Climate: Cfc

Kaldbak (Danish: Kalbak) is a village in the Faroe Islands, on Streymoy's east coast and part of Tórshavn Municipality. The village lies on the northern side of the fjord Kaldbaksfjørður.

== History ==
Excavations show that Kaldbak was already inhabited by the 11th century. The parish church in Kaldbak was built in 1835. The village was only connected to the Streymoy road system in 1980.

== Notable people ==
Notable people that were born or lived in Kaldbak include:

- Knút Wang (1917–1976), journalist and politician

== See also ==
- List of towns in the Faroe Islands
