= Tórshavn Municipality =

Tórshavn Municipality Tórshavnar kommuna (Faroese) Thorshavn Kommune (Danish)
- Municipality
- Flag Seal Coat of arms

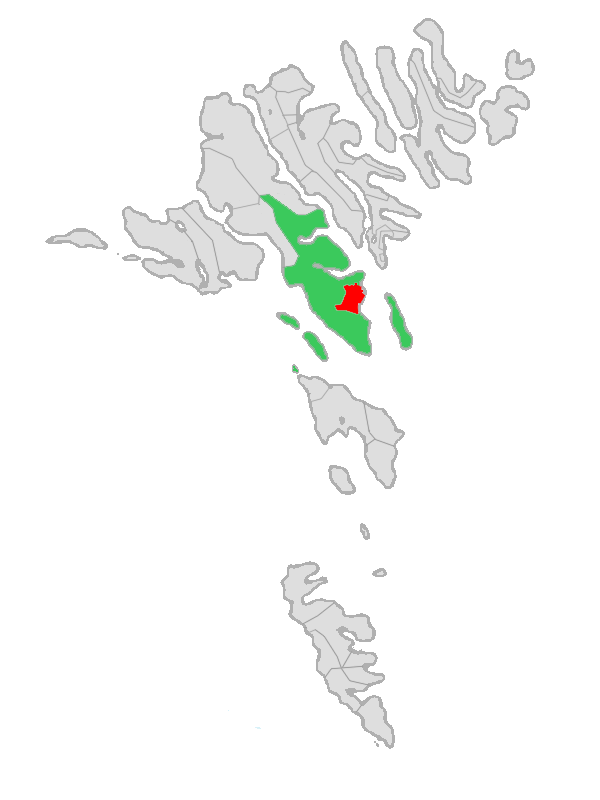
- Coordinates: 62.04°N 6.88°W
- State: Kingdom of Denmark
- Constituent country: Faroe Islands
- Islands: Streymoy; Koltur; Hestur; Nólsoy

Area
  - Total: 173 km^{2} (67 sq mi)

Population (January 2024)
  - Total: 23,242
  - Density: 134/km^{2} (348/sq mi)
- Website: torshavn.fo

Tórshavn Municipality (Faroese: Tórshavnar kommuna; Danish: Thorshavn Kommune) is a municipality in the Danish territory of Faroe Islands. It encompasses the capital city of Tórshavn and its surrounding areas. It is the largest and most populous municipality in the Faroe Islands. It covers the southeastern coast of Streymoy island, and adjacent minor islands. The municipality serves as the political, economic, and cultural center of the archipelago. Its economy is largely driven by fishing, and maritime services.

== History ==
Tórshavn was established as the capital of a Viking settlement around 850 CE. The vikings held an outdoor assembly meeting called althing, in which all men were eligible to participate. It became the center of the islands' trade serving as the sole market place for islanders to conduct trade. The royal trade monopoly was initially established by the Norwegian Crown in 1271 CE. Fortifications were built in the 1500s to defend against pirates. A harsh period began in 1655 CE when control of the region was given by king Frederick III of Denmark to Kristoffer Gabel, who imposed oppressive trade rules. A fire destroyed houses and records in 1673 CE, and conditions improved in the early 18th century. However, in 1709, a smallpox outbreak killed most of the population of Tórshavn. In the latter half of the 18th century, it re-developed as a major trading post under the administration of Niels Ryberg. Though the trade monopoly was abolished in 1856, the economy continued to develop with Tórshavn at its center. The town council was founded in 1866, and Tórshavn gained a municipal charter in 1909. Improvements came after 1709 when trade became a royal monopoly, though the city suffered a devastating smallpox outbreak. A harbour was built in 1927 to aid the berthing of larger ships. The region was occupied by Britain during the Second World War.

== Geography ==
Tórshavn is a municipality in the Danish territory of Faroe Islands, which encompasses the capital city of Tórshavn and its surrounding areas. It covers the southeastern coast of Streymoy island, and adjacent minor islands. Covering an area of 173 km^{2} (67 sq mi), it is the largest municipality in the Faroe Islands. It is bordered by the 347 m (1,138 ft) high Mount Húsareyn to the southeast and 350 m (1,150 ft) high Mount Kirkjubøreyn to the northwest. The territory has a temperate climate, due to the proximity of the Gulf Stream. The climate is characterized by cooler summers and mild winters.

== Demographics ==
The municipality had a population of about 23,242 in 2024. With nearly 40% of the total population of the islands residing here, it is the most populous in the Faroe Islands.

Population of Tórshavn
| Year | 1801 | 1854 | 1900 | 1925 | 1950 | 1975 | 1980 | 1985 | 1990 | 1995 | 1997 | 1998 | 1999 | 2000 | 2001 | 2002 | 2005 | 2007 | 2015 | 2020 |
| Population | 554 | 900 | 1,656 | 2,896 | 5,607 | 11,329 | 12,641 | 16,118 | 17,703 | 16,500 | 16,925 | 17,253 | 17,498 | 17,890 | 18,245 | 18,570 | 19,282 | 19,318 | 20,198 | 21,926 |

Tórshavn serves as the major political, economic, and cultural center of the archipelago. Its economy is largely driven by fishing, and maritime services. It hosts the busiest harbour and port in the Faroe islands.

== Administration ==
Tórshavn contains the following towns and villages– Tórshavn, Argir, Hoyvík, Hvítanes, Kaldbak, Kaldbaksbotnur, Kirkjubøur, Velbastaður, Kollafjørður, Oyrareingir, Signabøur, Sund, Norðradalur, Syðradalur, Nólsoy, Hestur, Koltur. Tórshavn's municipal council consists of 13 members, elected every four years, headed by a mayor.

| Election | Party | | | | | Total seats | Turnout | Elected mayor |
|---|---|---|---|---|---|---|---|---|
| Election | A | B | C | E | F | Total seats | Turnout | Elected mayor |
| 2016 | 2 | 1 | 5 | 4 | 1 | 13 | 79.5% | Annika Olsen (A) |
| 2020 | 2 | 1 | 6 | 3 | 1 | 13 | 81.0% | Heðin Mortensen (C) |
Data from Kvf.fo

== Sources ==
Heim | Hagstova Føroya
