= Hoyvík =

Hoyvík Højvig
- Town
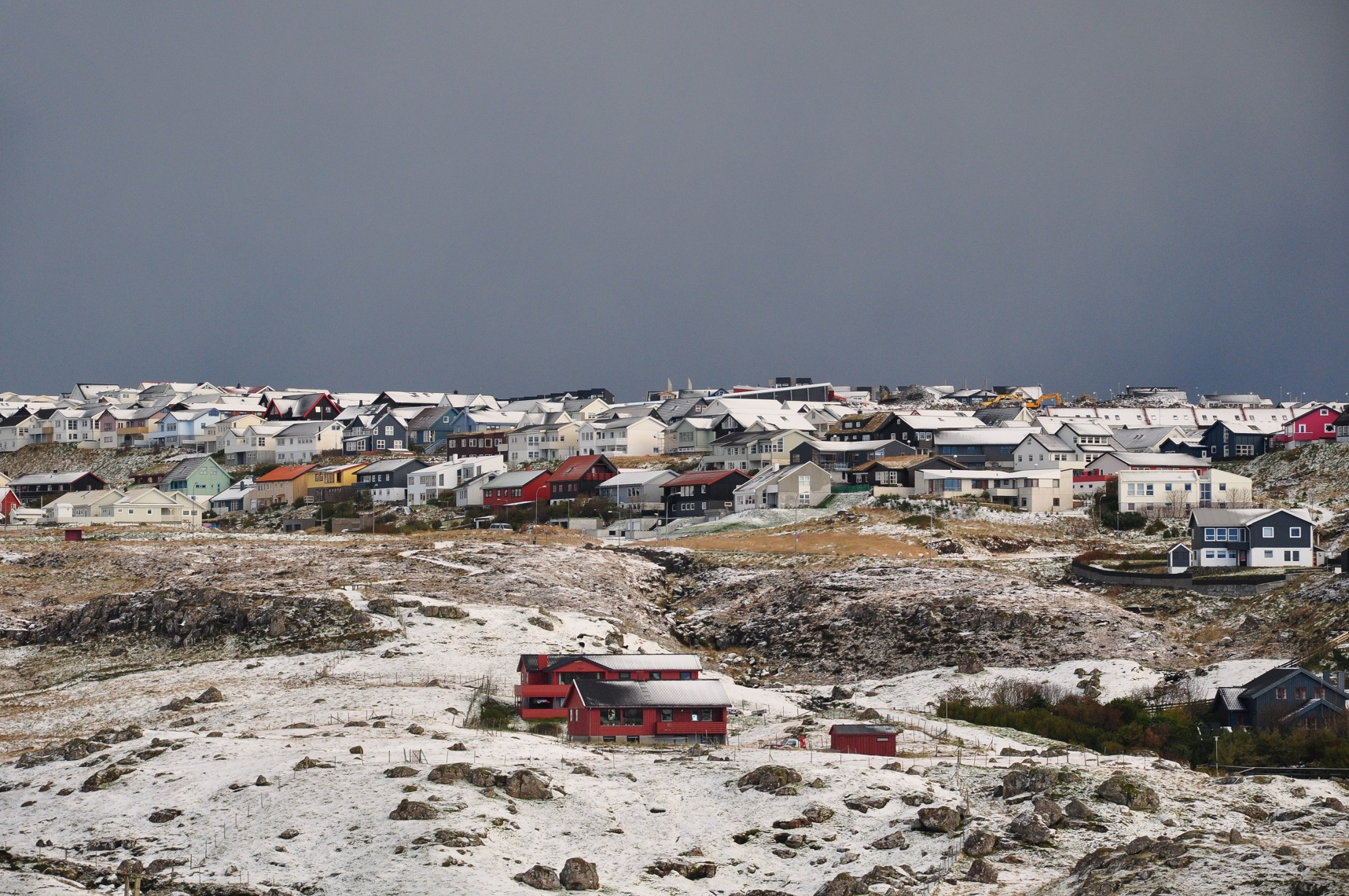
- View north from the Eystari Ringvegur over the Hoydalar area towards the Ovastu Hoydalar neighbourhood

- Location within the Faroe Islands
- Coordinates: 62°01′32″N 6°45′32″W
- State: Kingdom of Denmark
- Country: Faroe Islands
- Island: Streymoy
- Municipality: Tórshavn Municipality

Population (September 2025)
  - Total: 4,712
- Demonym: Hoyvíkingur
- ZIP code: FO 188
- Climate: Subpolar oceanic climate (Cfc)

Hoyvík (Danish: Højvig) is a town in the Faroe Islands. It is part of the Tórshavn Municipality, and de facto is merged as a northern suburb of Tórshavn, the Faroese capital.

== History ==
Hoyvík is believed to be a very old settlement. An early source is the Færeyinga saga, a 13th-century recollection of earlier Viking oral recounts.

Before the late 20th century the population was very low. Until the mid 19th century the entire population comprised one farm. A few more houses were built close to the farmland after the Second World War. A real development boom has been in Hoyvík since about the early 1980s. The new houses have been built on land that was formerly considered farmer outfields. The architecture of some of these newer houses include detached and terraced housing. The purchaser of one of these terraced houses, buys the two outer walls, but then builds the house itself in colours and design of their own choice. The result is an unusual effect of combining terraced housing with the idiosyncratic personal touch of the family living in it.

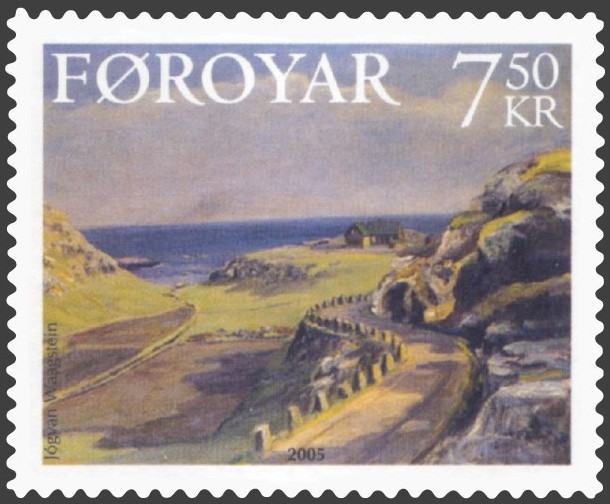
Jógvan Waagstein: Kýrdalur í Hoyvík 1930 (Village of Hoyvík) Stamp FO 532 of Postverk Føroya Date of issue: 19 September 2005

== Notable facts ==
A 17th-century farmhouse functions today as an open-air museum, part of the National Museum of the Faroe Islands. Important institutions in Hoyvík are the gymnasium and the Faroese Historical Museum. The first church in Hoyvík was finished in 2007. In 2005 a free trade agreement between the Faroe Islands and Iceland was signed in Hoyvík at the Historical Museum. It is consequently known as the Hoyvík Agreement.

== Sports ==
- FC Hoyvík
- Hondbóltsfelagið H71

== See also ==
- Hoyvík Agreement
- List of towns in the Faroe Islands
