= Langasandur =

Langasandur Langesand (Danish)
- Village
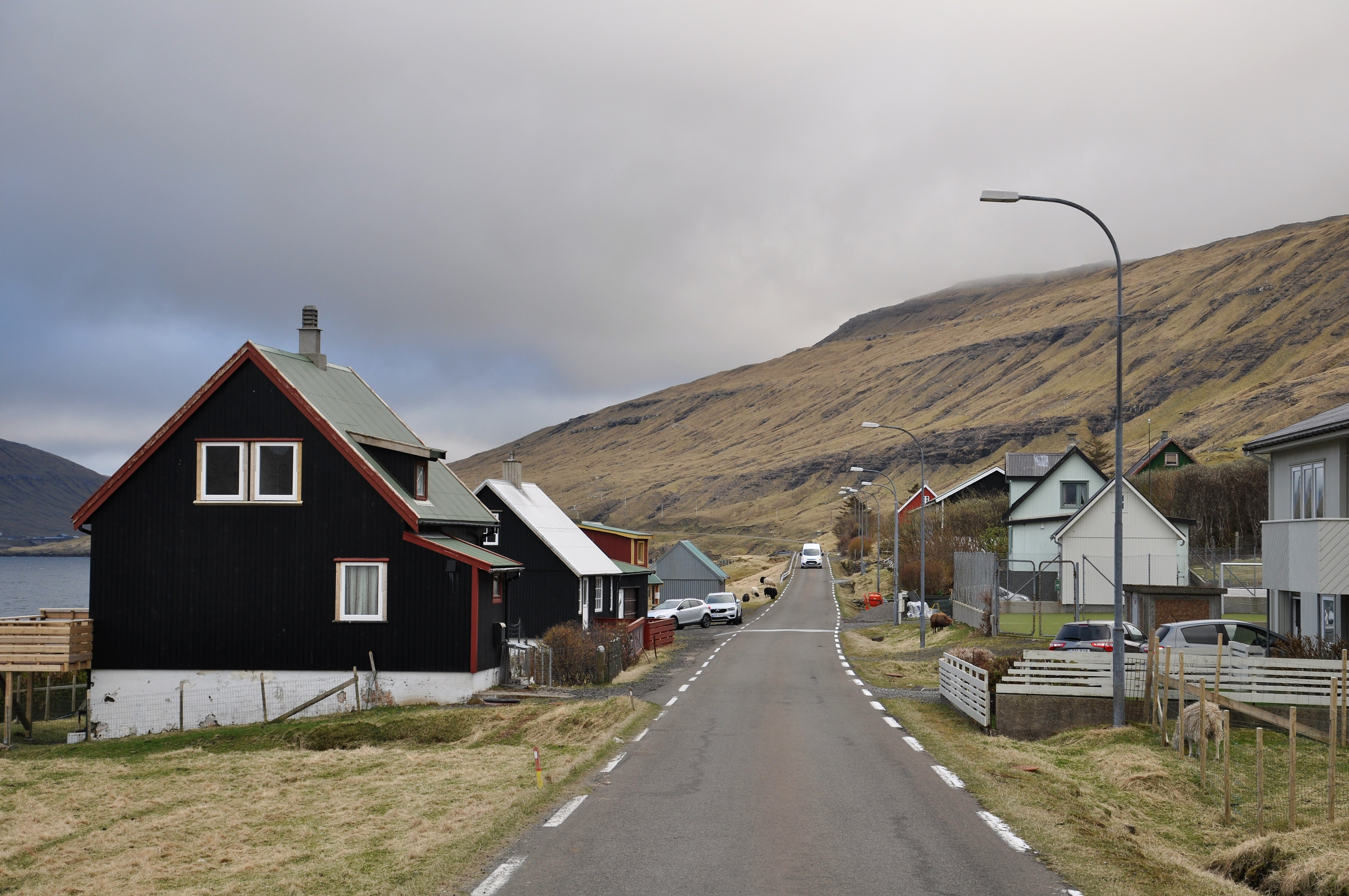
- Langasandur (seen from the north)

- Location in the Faroe Islands
- Coordinates: 62°14′14″N 7°3′13″W
- State: Kingdom of Denmark
- Constituent country: Faroe Islands
- Island: Streymoy
- Municipality: Sunda

Population (September 2025)
  - Total: 41
- Time zone: GMT
  - Summer (DST): UTC+1 (EST)
- Postal code: FO 438
- Climate: Cfc

Langasandur (Danish: Langesand) is a village located on the Faroese island of Streymoy in the municipality of Sunda.

The village was settled in 1838, the name Langasandur means Longbeach.

== Whaling station ==
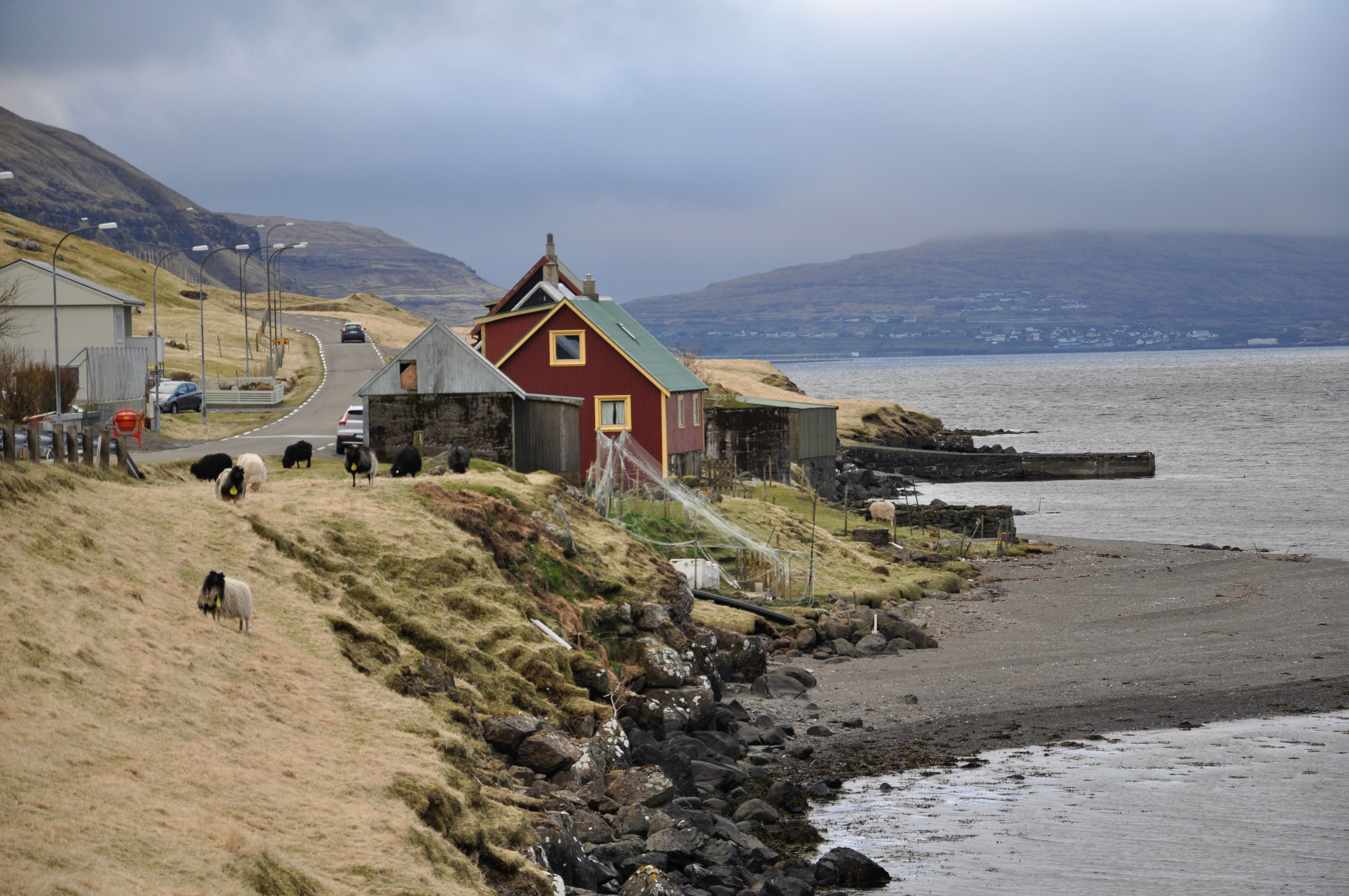
Langasandur with its beach

In 1894, the first whaling station in the Faroe Islands, was built at Gjánoyri, about 1 km south of the village. It was constructed by the Norwegian Hans Albert Grøn from Sandefjord, he sailed one of his decommissioned whaling stations from Finnmarken, and set it up in Gjánoyri, and started whaling with his boat Urd.

The first whaling season, lasted from 24 June, when the first whale was shot, to 9 September when Grøn returned to Norway with 940 barrels of whale oil, and 5 tonnes of baleen, 46 whales were shot.

In 1901, Grøn built the first industrial factory in the country, it was located right next to the whaling station, and produced bone meal to increase earnings from the whales, which before, only gave whale oil, and almost free whale meat to the locals.

The station closed down in 1925.

The boats connected to the station were: Urd (1894-1911), Skuld (1897-1911), Funding (1914), Leif (1914), Dominion I (1920) and Norman I (1920)

== See also ==
- List of towns in the Faroe Islands
