= Øravíkarlíð =

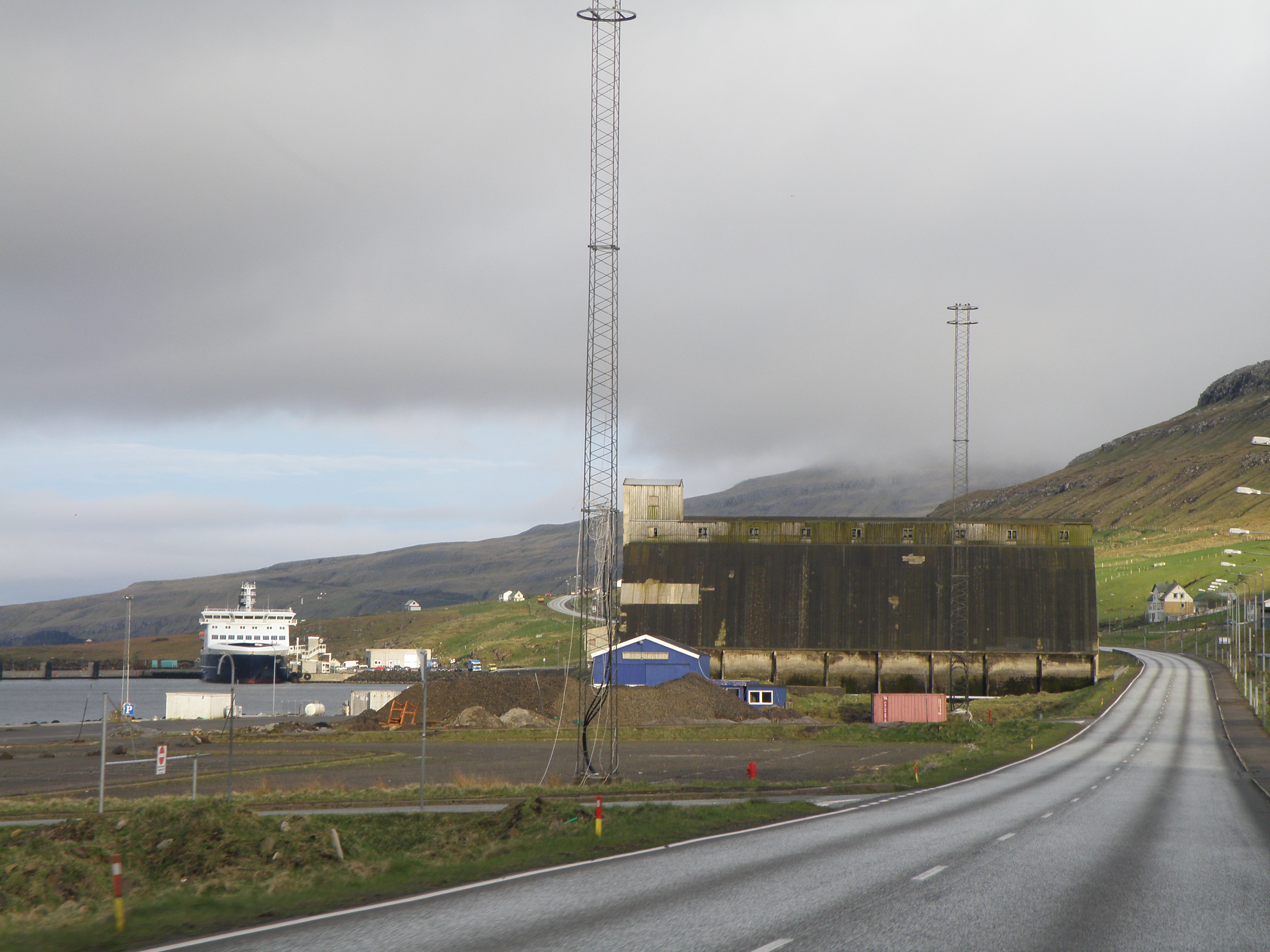

- Location within Denmark Faroe Islands
- Coordinates: 61°33′N 6°50′W
- State: Kingdom of Denmark
- Constituent country: Faroe Islands
- Island: Suðuroy
- Municipality: Tvøroyrar kommuna

Population (September 2025)
  - Total: 55
- Time zone: GMT
  - Summer (DST): UTC+1 (EST)

Øravíkarlíð (alternative spelling Ørðavíkarlíð) or Líðin is a village on the island of Suðuroy, the southernmost of the Faroe Islands. The population was 60 in December 2008.

== See also ==
- List of towns in the Faroe Islands
