= Syðradalur =

- Village
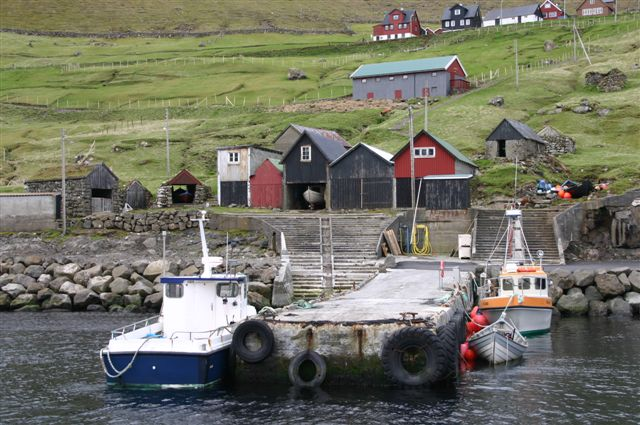
- Kaien, Syðradalur

- Location in the Faroe Islands
- Coordinates: 62°14′46″N 6°39′48″W
- State: Kingdom of Denmark
- Constituent country: Faroe Islands
- Island: Kalsoy
- Municipality: Klaksvík Municipality
- Founded: 1812

Population (December 2018)
  - Total: 6
- Time zone: GMT
  - Summer (DST): UTC+1 (EST)
- Postal code: FO 795
- Climate: Cfc

Syðradalur (Faroese pronunciation: [ˈsiːɹaˌdɛalʊɹ], is a village on the island of Kalsoy, one of the Faroe Islands.

Syðradalur is the southernmost village on the island, and is in Húsar Municipality. On 1 January 2009, Syðradalur had nine inhabitants, down from 12 in 1985. Bjørn Kalsø comes from Syðradalur.

== History ==
Syðradalur is a settlement village (Faroese: niðursetubygd) founded at the beginning of the 19th century by inhabitants of the village of Blankskáli on the south-west of the island. Syðradalur was previously inhabited in the 17th century, but the reason it was abandoned is unknown. In 1855, a boat from the village was sunk on a large boulder. In 1963, another boat from the village, this time carrying three men, was also sunk.

A tunnel system was built in 1985 linking Syðradalur with the other villages on the island. MF Sam travels the route between Syðradalur and Klaksvík 6–9 times a day, and later a bus service from Syðradalur to Trøllanes, with stops at every village between, 2–4 times daily.

In 2009, house numbers were introduced to the village, together with the three street names Dalsgøta, á Bakkanum and Knúksdalur.

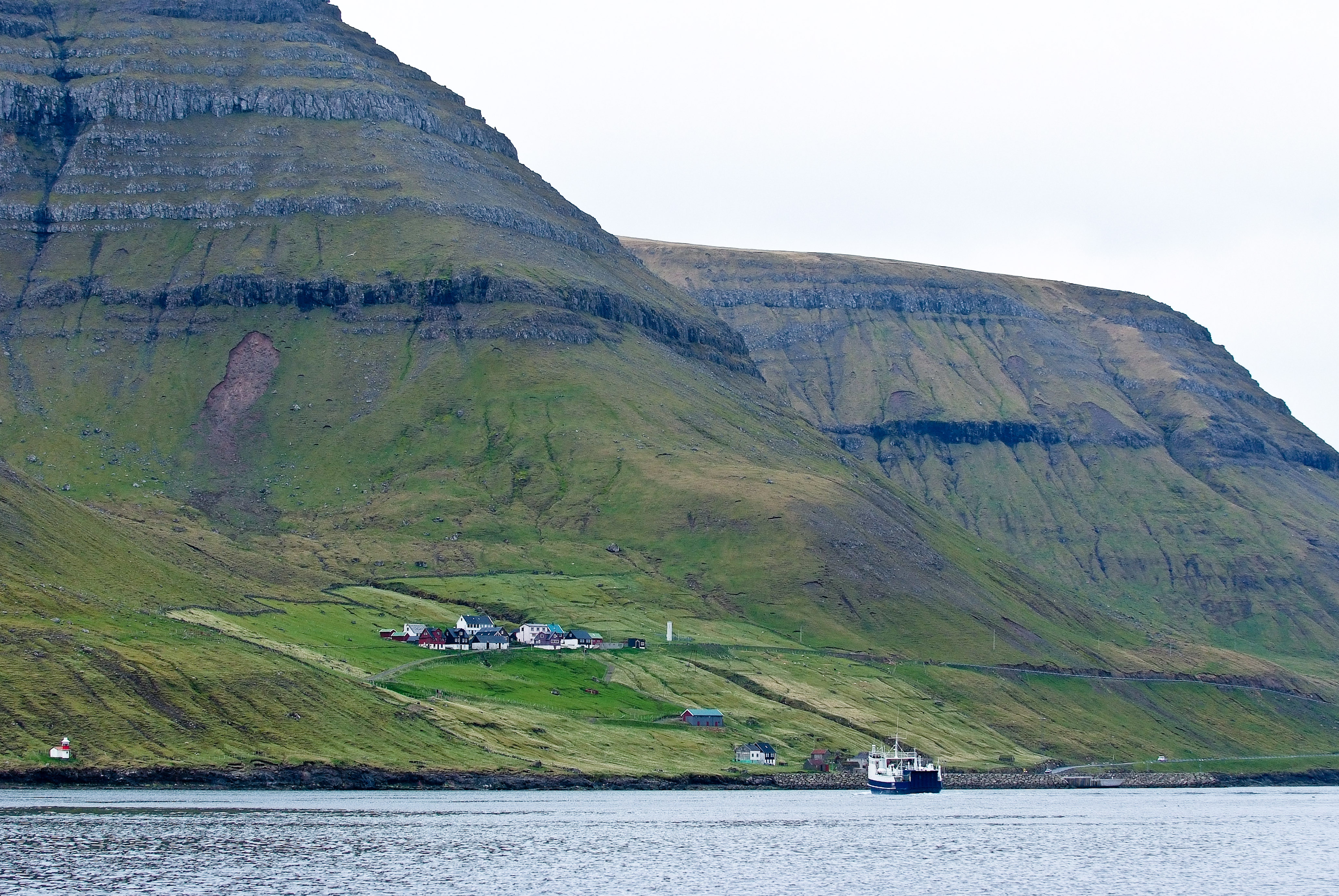
Syðradalur from the sea

== See also ==
- List of towns in the Faroe Islands
