= Kollafjørður =

- Village
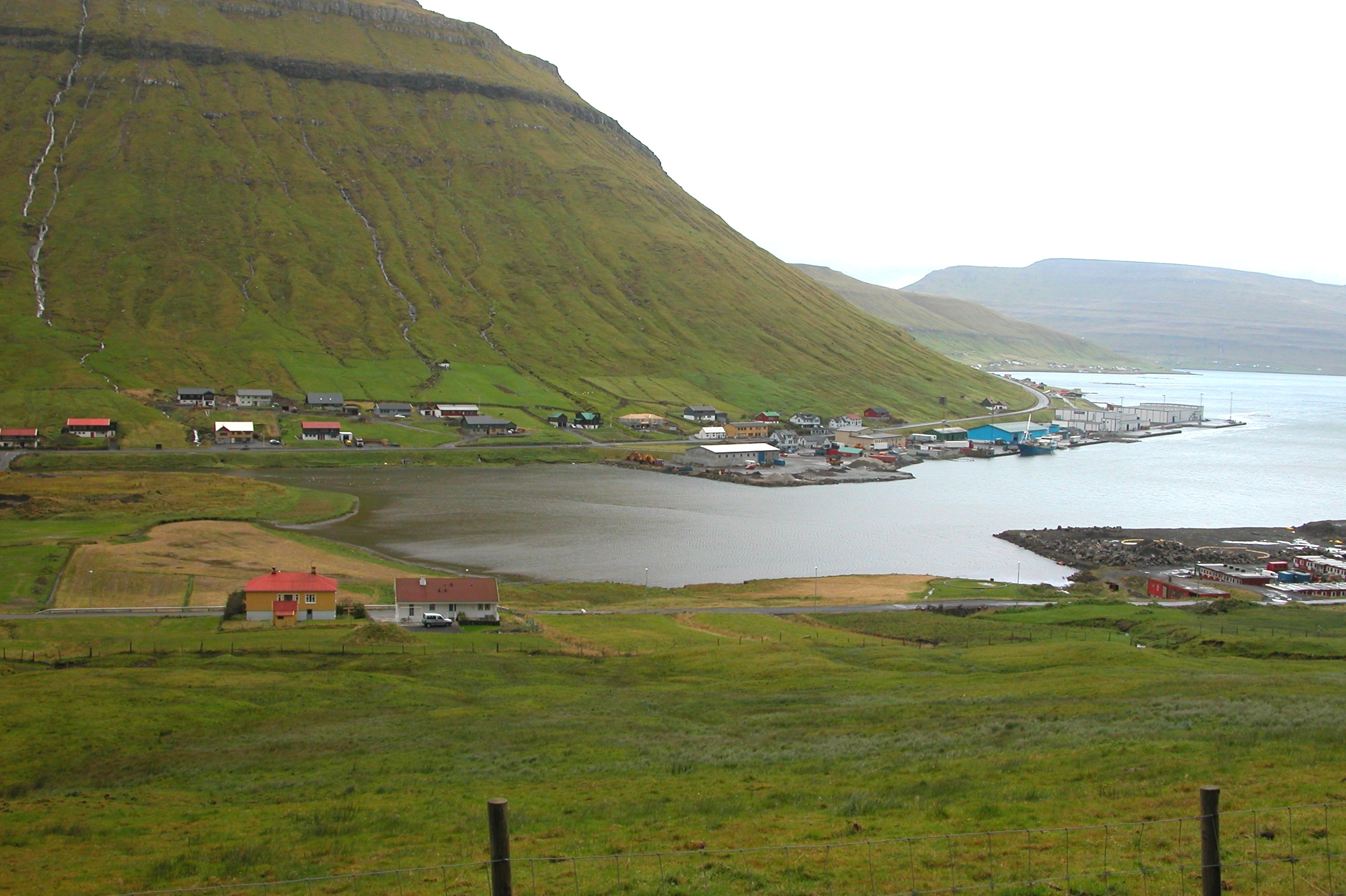

- Location of the village in the Faroe Islands
- Coordinates: 62°7′6″N 6°54′20″W
- State: Kingdom of Denmark
- Constituent country: Faroe Islands
- Island: Streymoy
- Municipality: Tórshavn Municipality

Population (September 2025)
  - Total: 821
- Time zone: UTC+0 (GMT)
  - Summer (DST): UTC+1 (EST)
- Climate: ET

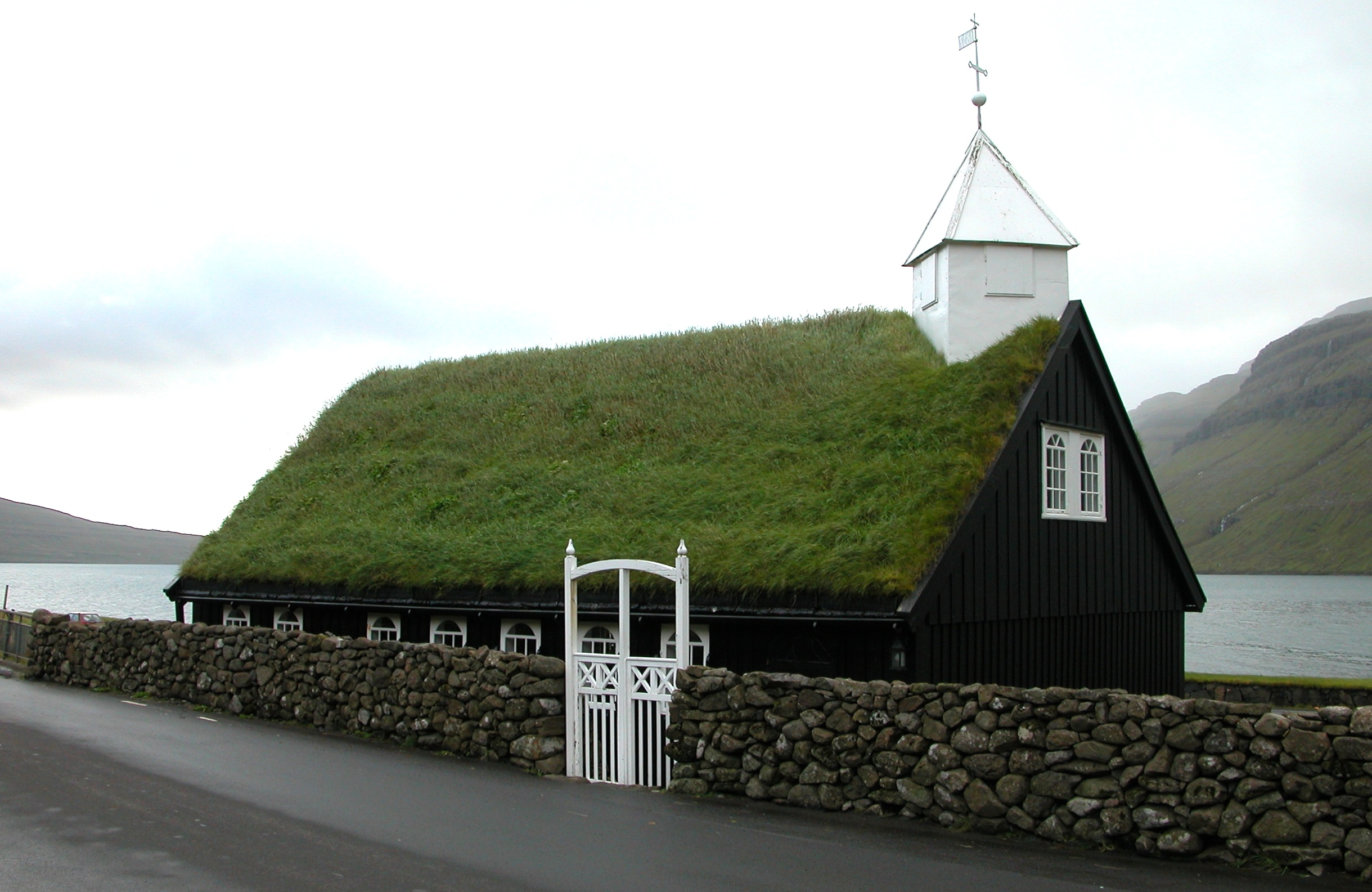
Church of Kollafjørður

Kollafjørður (Danish: Kollefjord) is a village in the Faroe Islands, located on the island of Streymoy. As of 29. April 2025, the village had a population of 815. Its postal code is FO 410. Until 2001 it was a municipality in its own right but is now part of the Tórshavn Municipality. It is located 21.8 kilometres (13.5 mi) by road north of Tórshavn, and stretches 7 km (4.3 mi) along the fjord of the same name.

== Geography ==
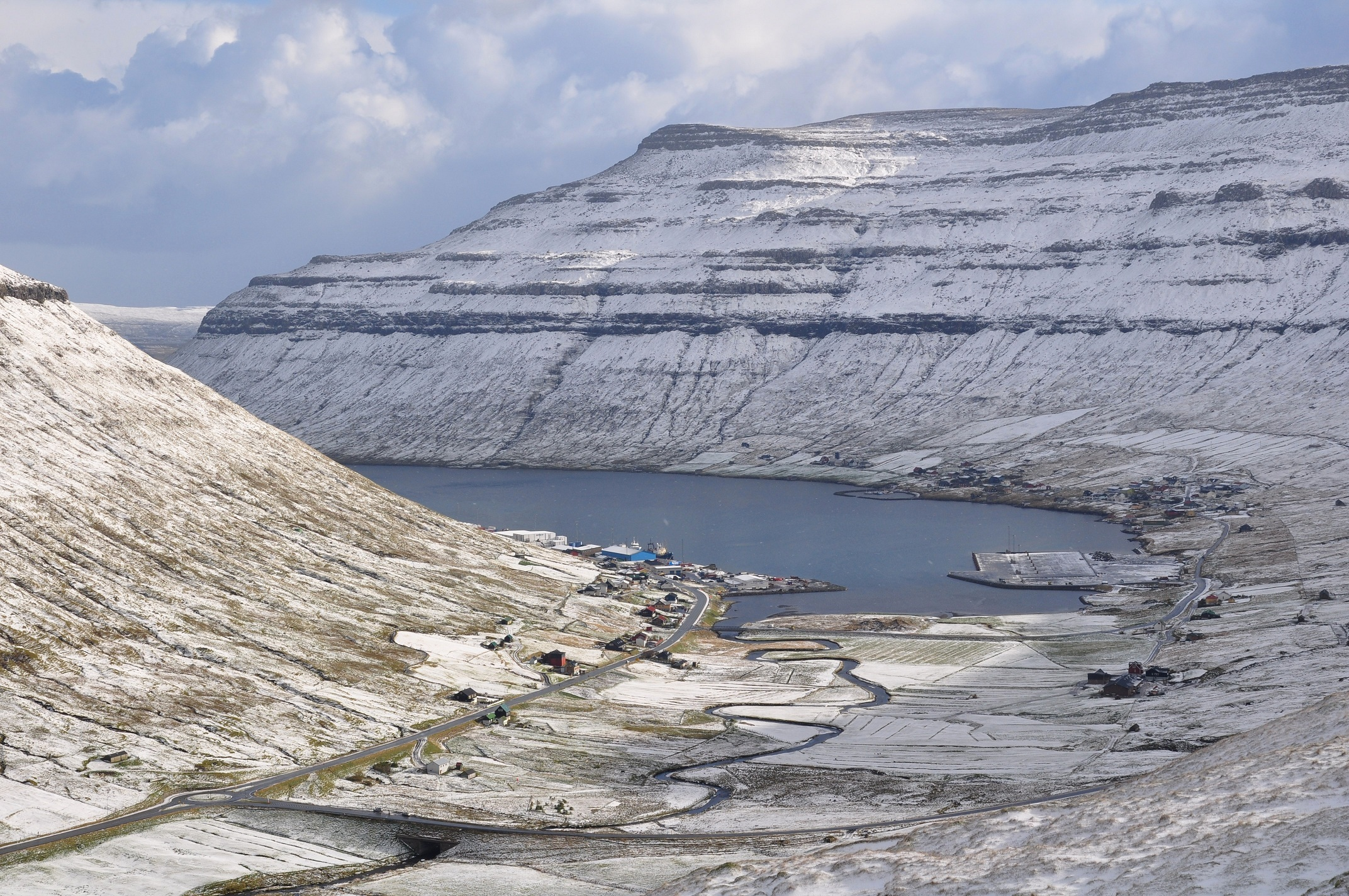
View of the village and fjord

The village is centered along the northern shore of the Kollafjørður Fjord. Above the fjord is a narrow valley which stretches over a hilly region where trails are used for trekking. The Kollafjørður valley measures 8 kilometres (5.0 mi) and forms the eastern portion of the Kollfjardardalur valley, which lies east–west across Streymoy.

It is a village which has developed length-wise along the main road with a few shops. The northern shore line of the road adjoins the fjord. The harbour is located 23 km north of Tórshavn at the centre of the Faroe Islands. It is the third harbour under the control of Tórshavn Port Authority.

== Demography ==
Initially there were only a few dwellings adjoining the village church. However, there has been growth in the area reaching a population of 900 in 2008, but thereafter it has been declining with 807 in 2009 and 793 in 2012.

== Landmarks ==
The settlement extends along the north side of the fjord beside the fishing port and fish factories. In the late Middle Ages, it was a moot where the so-called spring assembly gathered. The church is a typical Faroese wooden church from 1837. Standing close to the coast, it is a black-tarred wooden building with a turf roof, white painted windows, and a small white bell tower on the roof's western end. Inside, everything is made of unvarnished wood. There are a few spots of blue colouring on the pulpit but otherwise nothing has been painted. The little ship hanging under the vault was donated as a tribute by the parents of a 25-year-old who drowned off the coast of Iceland. In addition to the village's fishing industry, there is a supermarket, a café, a timber outlet and the Atlanticpane window factory.

== Culture ==
The annual village festival, Sundslagsstevna, is celebrated alternatingly in Kollafjørður, Hósvík and Hvalvík in early July. Jens Christian Djurhuus (1773–1853), who lived in Kollafjørður, wrote a number of ballads based on the Icelandic sagas. They are still sung today, especially the ones about Olaf Tryggvason or the Battle of Svolder and the ballads of Sigmund and Leif.

The poet Tummas Napoleon Djurhuus (1928-1971) was a native of Kollafjørður.

== See also ==
- List of towns in the Faroe Islands
