= Streymoy =

Streymoy Strømø
- Island
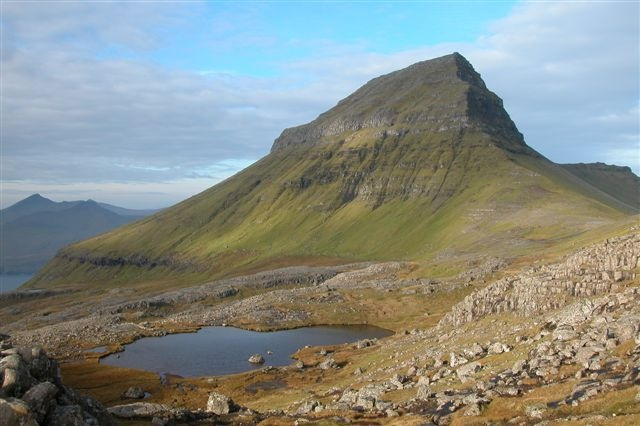
- Skælingsfjall (767 m) on Streymoy

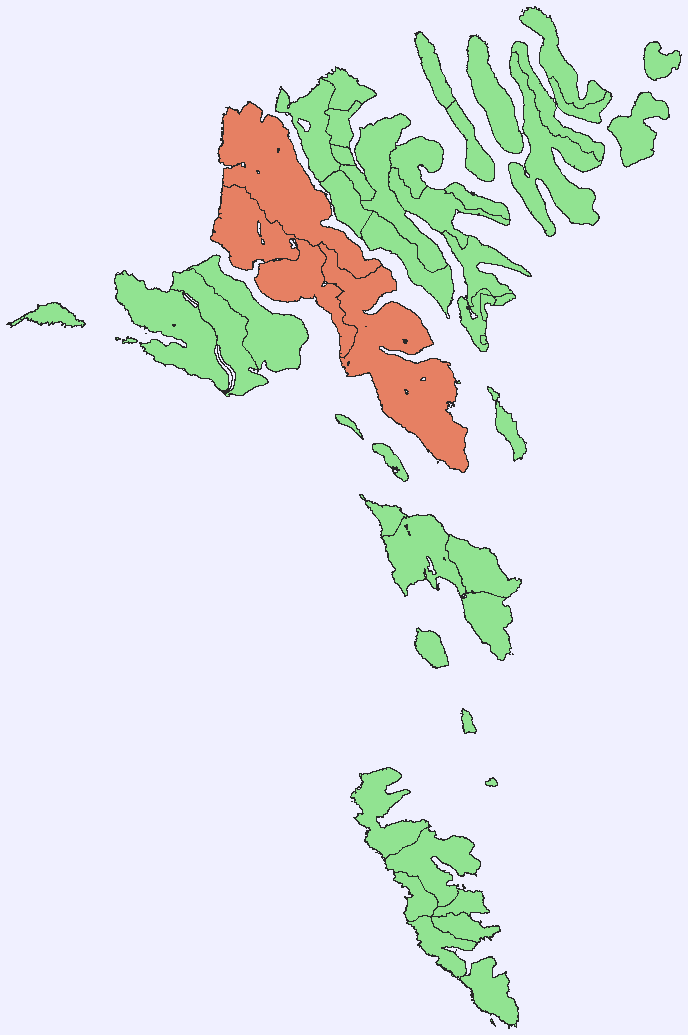
- Location within the Faroe Islands
- Coordinates: 62°08′N 7°01′W
- State: Kingdom of Denmark
- Constituent country: Faroe Islands
- Region: Streymoy

Area
  - Total: 373 km^{2} (144 sq mi)
  - Rank: 1

Population (01-2020)
  - Total: 24,682
  - Rank: 1
  - Density: 66.2/km^{2} (171/sq mi)
- Time zone: UTC+0 (GMT)
  - Summer (DST): UTC+1 (WEST)
- Calling code: 298

Streymoy (Faroese pronunciation: [ˈstɾeɪ̯mɔɪ̯], Danish: Strømø) is the largest and most populated island of the Faroe Islands. The capital, Tórshavn, is located on its southeast coast. The name means "island of currents". It also refers to the largest region of the country that also includes the islands of Hestur, Koltur and Nólsoy.

== Geography ==
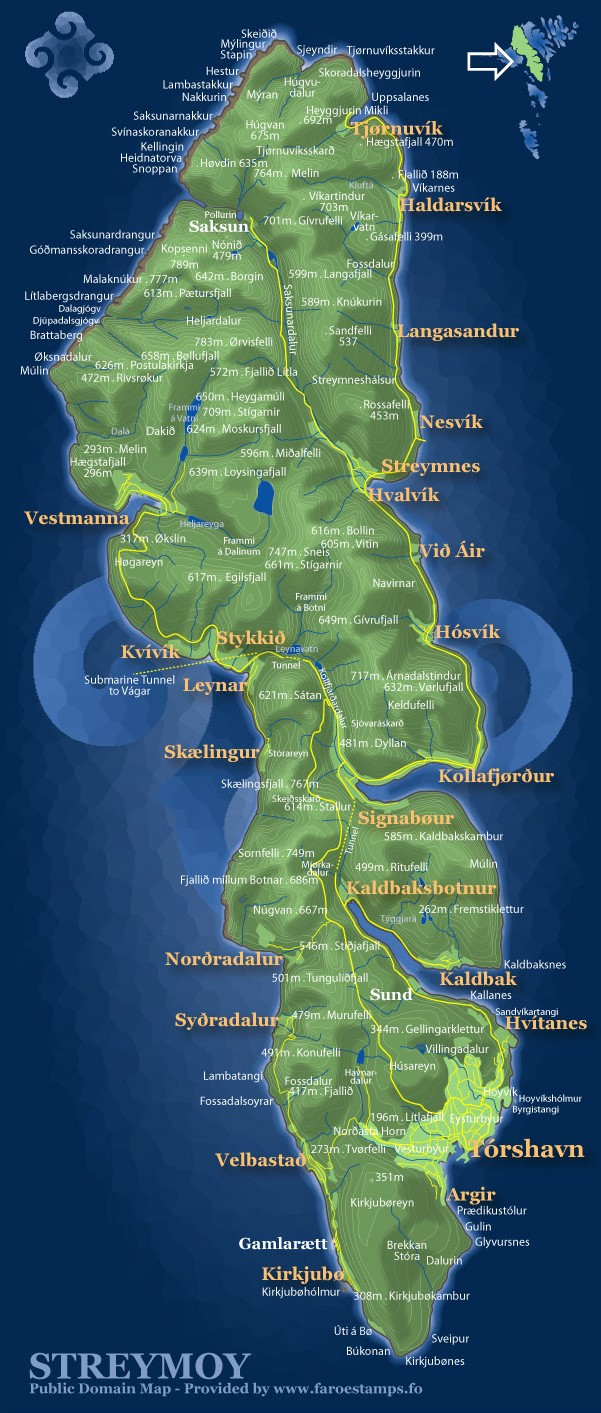
Map of Streymoy

The island is oblong in shape and stretches roughly in northwest–southeast direction with a length of 47 kilometres (29 miles) and a width of around 10 kilometres (6 miles). There are two deeply-indented fjords in the southeast: Kollafjørður and Kaldbaksfjørður. The island is mountainous (average height is 337 meter), especially in the northwest, with the highest peak being Kopsenni (789 metres (2,589 ft)). That area is dominated by over 500-metre-high (1,640 ft) cliffs. The area is known as Vestmannabjørgini, which means Cliffs of Vestmanna. The beaches of Tórshavn, Vestmanna, Leynar, Kollafjørður, Hvalvík (meaning Whale Bay) and Tjørnuvík are officially approved grind beaches for whaling.

Like the rest of the Faroe Islands there are numerous short streams and minor lakes. The main vegetation is grass, with no trees. Some of the villages have planted trees inside or just outside the village. These parks need to have fences around them in order to keep sheep out.

Streymoy is separated from the nearby Eysturoy, the second-largest island of the Faroe Islands, by the sounds of Sundini and Tangafjørður. To the west lies the island of Vágar, and to the south the island of Sandoy, separated by the Vestmannasund and Skopunarfjørður respectively. Three additional smaller islands are situated around the southern tip of Streymoy and belong to the Streymoy sýsla: Koltur, Hestur and Nólsoy; all of which are incorporated into Tórshavn Municipality.

=== Important bird area ===
The north-east coastline of the island has been identified as an Important Bird Area by BirdLife International because of its significance as a breeding site for seabirds, especially northern fulmars (75,000 pairs), European storm petrels (2500 pairs), European shags (150 pairs), great skuas (120 pairs), black-legged kittiwakes (9000 pairs), Atlantic puffins (20,000 pairs) and black guillemots (300 pairs).

== Population ==
There are about 24,682 inhabitants on the island (January 2020), which represents more than 45% of the whole population of the Faroe Islands. The majority of them reside in the capital Tórshavn, which has a population of about 21,000 in the municipality, of whom 13,089 live in Tórshavn, 3,956 in Hoyvík, and 2,110 in Argir. Hoyvík and Argir are suburbs of Tórshavn, but they have grown together. Around 1,202 people live in Vestmanna, and 789 in Kollafjørður. Besides being the seat of the government, Tórshavn is also the chief port, the seat of the university and the commercial centre of the islands.

== Towns and villages ==
The other important towns include: Vestmanna, the former ferry port in the west, Kollafjørður at the centre and the picturesque villages of Saksun and Tjørnuvík in the north. From a historic point of view the village of Kirkjubøur near the southern tip of the island is very important as it was an episcopal center during the Middle Ages.

List of villages

- Tjørnuvík
- Haldarsvík
- Langasandur
- Nesvík
- Streymnes
- Hvalvík
- Saksun
- Hósvík
- Kollafjørður
- Signabøur
- Leynar
- Kvívík
- Vestmanna
- Kaldbaksbotnur
- Kaldbak
- Sund
- Norðradalur
- Hvítanes
- Hoyvík
- Tórshavn
- Argir
- Syðradalur
- Velbastaður
- Kirkjubøur

== Transportation ==
All the settlements are connected by surfaced roads. The main entry road to Tórshavn passes through a 2.8 kilometres (1.7 mi) long tunnel. The connection to the island of Eysturoy is via Streymin Bridge over the Sundini sound. Since 2002, the almost 5 kilometres (3.1 mi) long Vágar Tunnel has connected Streymoy to Vágar, thereby completing the road connections of the three "mainland" islands. Since December 2020, the Eysturoyartunnilin has connected southern Streymoy to Eysturoy. Sandoyartunnilin connecting Streymoy to Sandoy opened to the public in December 2023.

Streymoy is connected by regular ferry service to the island of Sandoy from the ferry port of Gamlarætt near Kirkjubøur, and to the islands of Suðuroy and Nólsoy from the ferry port in Tórshavn. A scheduled ferry connects Tórshavn with Hirtshals in Denmark and Seyðisfjörður in Iceland. The closest airport is Vágar Airport on Vágar island (35 minutes by car); it is the only airport in the Faroe Islands.

== Gallery ==
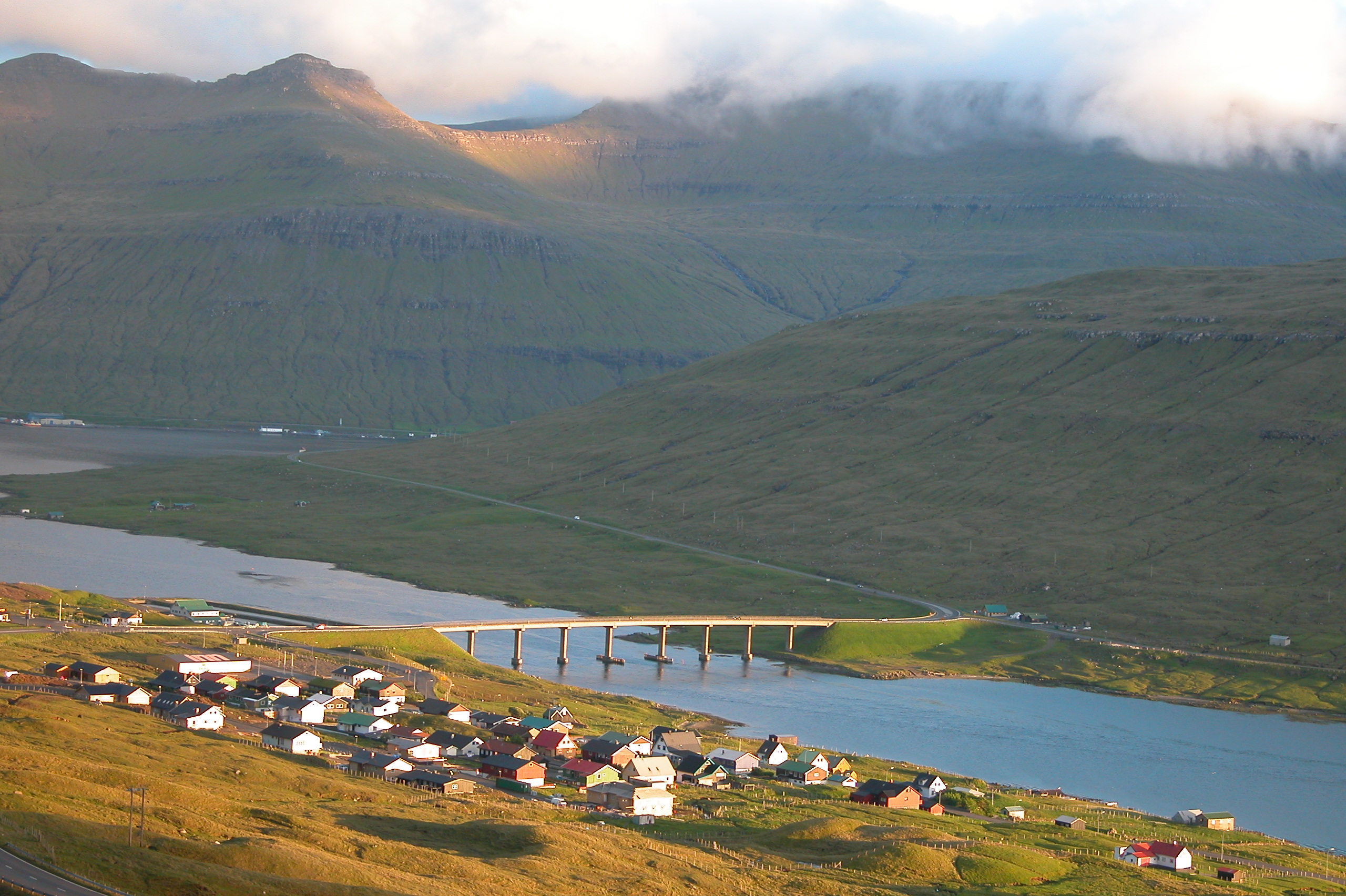
The Streymin Bridge over Sundini Sound connects Eysturoy to Streymoy.

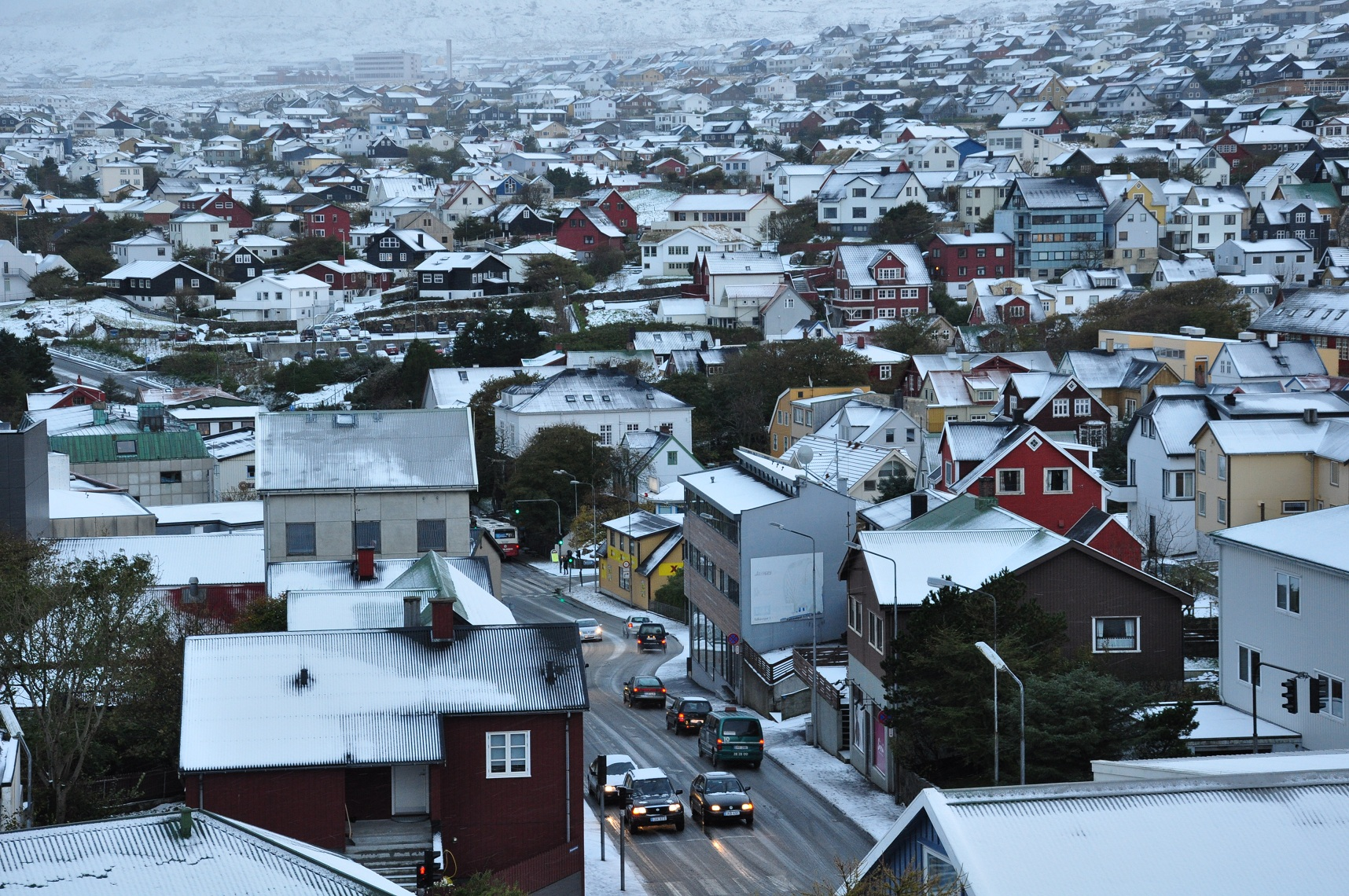
The capital Tórshavn is on Streymoy.

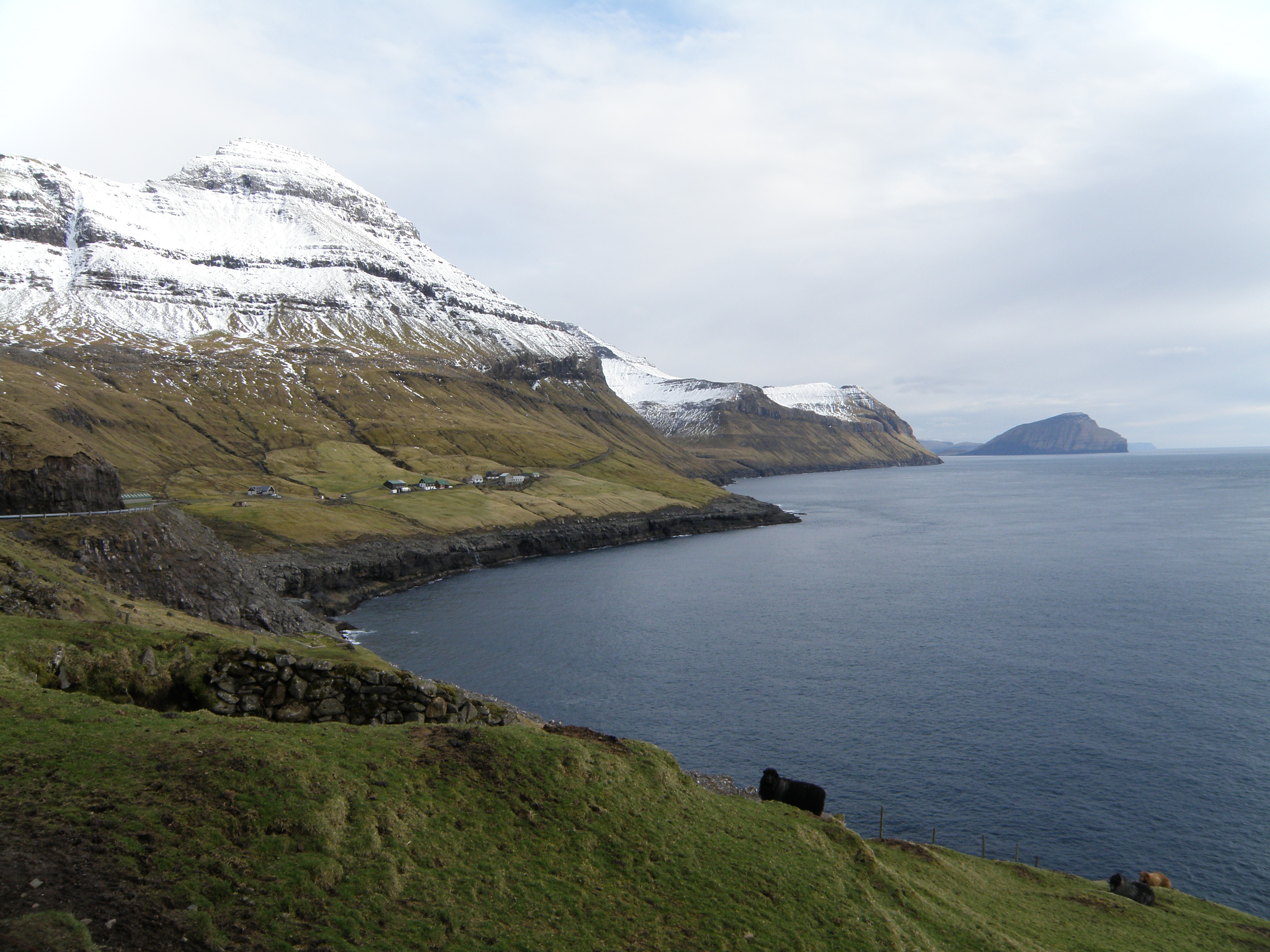
West coast of Streymoy.

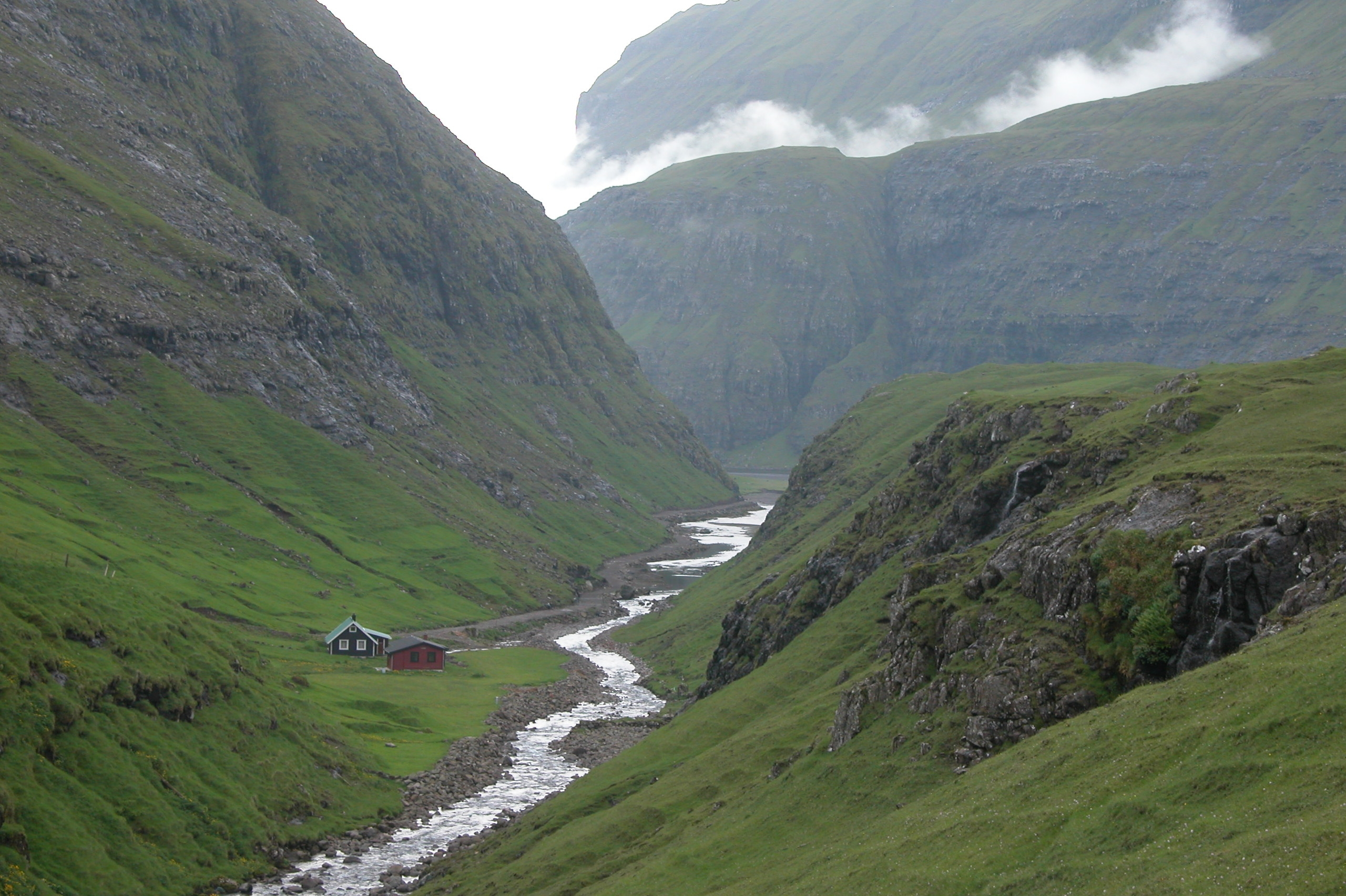
Mountain scenery near Saksun.

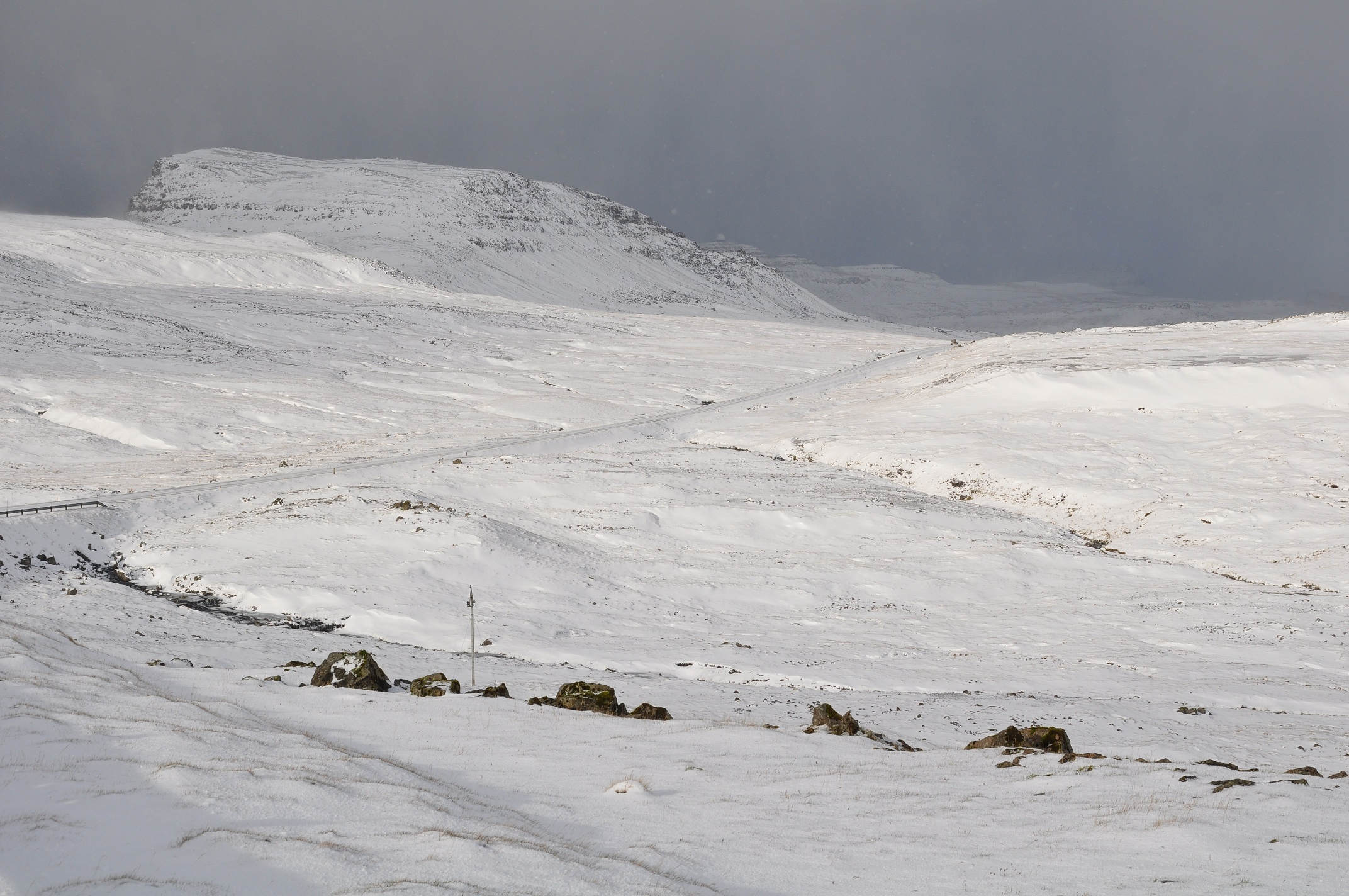
The central highlands of Streymoy in winter.
