= Ingálvur av Reyni =

Painter of the Faroe Islands

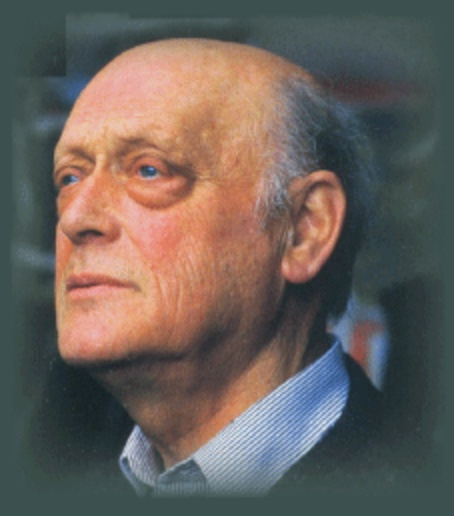
- Ingálvur av Reyni, 1920-2005. stamp of 2002.
- Born: 18 December 1920; Tórshavn, Faroe Islands
- Died: 26 November 2005 (aged 84); Tórshavn, Faroe Islands

Ingálvur av Reyni (18 December 1920 – 26 November 2005) was the most celebrated painter of the Faroe Islands during the last years.

Ingálvur av Reyni was born in Tórshavn. He rebelled through his expressionism against the epic content of his predecessors' art, and has opened up new paths in his painting. His art is characterised by a clear, French colourist tone, and his artistic roots go back to Paul Cézanne and Henri Matisse.

The nature of the Faroes, which makes a visual impact on any painter, is the theme in Reyni's art. But he experiences nature from the inside, as structures, tones, and fragments of a universe offering opportunities for graphical treatment of form and movement, light colours and rhythms. The expressions of nature become the basis of an abstract idiom.

The light fills his landscapes, interiors and figure paintings from the 1940s and 1950s, where he characteristically simplifies the motif in cubist style. The lines and forms of nature contribute to the strict, cubist-inspired composition of the picture, or they are subjected to it. The composition is free of all unnecessary elements, and the work becomes at the same time a picture of both the inner and the outer reality. Increasingly contrasting colours are set against each other, until the culmination at the end of the 1950s with the bold counterplay of complementary colours.

A solo exhibition in Tórshavn in 1961 broke new ground, showing for the first time a directly abstract perception of nature. The paintings had titles such as Kurpali (chaos, disorder) and Sjón í fuglaeyga (view through a bird's eye) This exhibition did not herald an instant conversion to non-figurative art – in the 1960s and well into the 1970s Ingálvur av Reyni treated landscape motifs as never before, although in a highly abstract way, especially the central theme of the village by the sea. His palettes vary from clear, powerful and glowing colours through a delicate greyish, anything but dry spectrum to the deep black register.

A series of works from the 1970s are abstractions of groups of figures and have titles such as girl or people by the sea, as can be seen in a trilogy owned by the art museum. In most recent years Ingálvur av Reyni has chiefly been an abstract painter, if this expression can apply to non-figurative art which is based on nature's own tones and structures. In his strongly painted, usually large and resolute compositions, the work breaks out from the inside. Warm earth tones glow from the deepest layers, sizzle when they touch cold, grey areas, and set light to others. The drama lies in the conflict of the colours and the dynamic movements of the brushstrokes. From time to time the rhythm is further emphasised by scratches made with the handle of the brush in the thick, varnish-like layers of shiny colour. This is tangible painting.

Ingálvur av Reyni produced drawings featuring the town with its houses around the harbor, ships, boats, and people in the streets, particularly older residents. His work includes drawings of figures, crowds, interiors, and street scenes resulting from his travels in Europe. While these drawings are more figurative or narrative than his paintings, their themes focus on line and form. He also produced non-figurative drawings.

In 2000 he received the Faroese Cultural Prize (Mentanarheiðursløn Landsins) from the Faroese government.

Reyni died at the age of 84 in 2005 in his hometown Tórshavn.

== Gallery of stamps ==
The following Faroese stamps from Postverk Føroya feature Reyni's work:

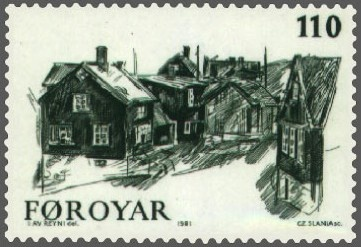
Stamp FR 53 of 1981: Old Tórshavn No. 1

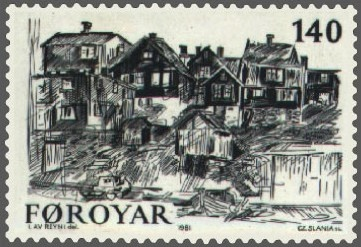
FR 54: No. 2

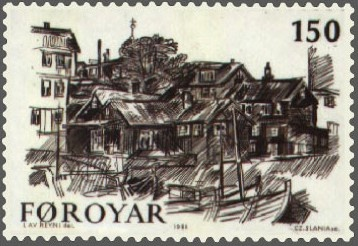
FR 55: No. 3

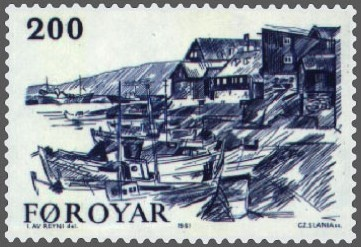
FR 56: No. 4
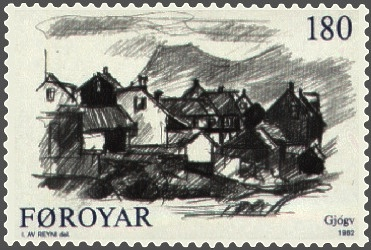
Stamp FR 66 of 1982: Gjógv.

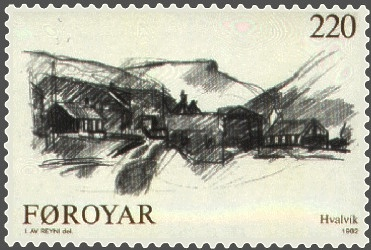
FR 67: Hvalvík.

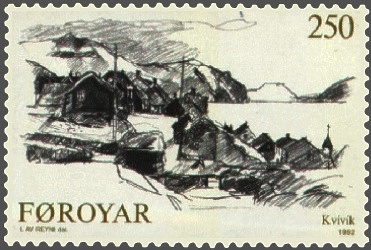
FR 68: Kvívík.
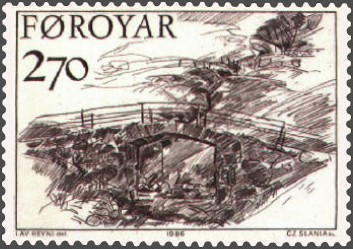
Stamp FR 136 of 1986, old bridges: Glyvragjógv at Glyvrar, Eysturoy of 1902.

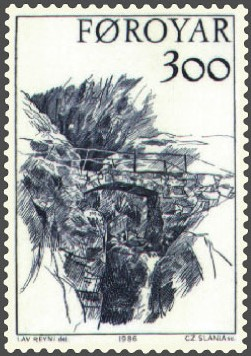
FR 137: Leypanagjógv at Oyrargjógv, Vágar of 1912.

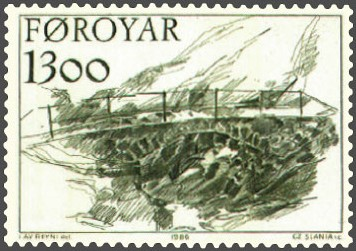
FR 138: Breiðá on the way to Skælingur, Streymoy of 1908.
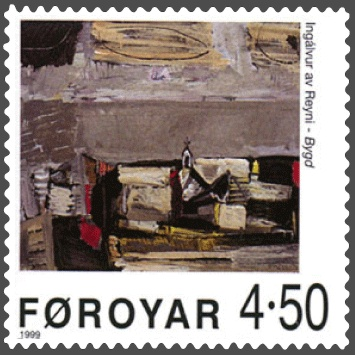
FR 354 of 1999: Village.

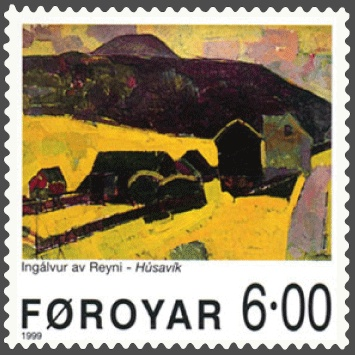
FR 355: Húsavík, Faroe Islands.

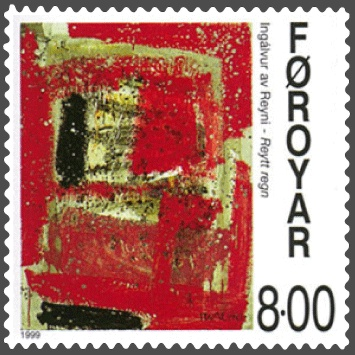
FR 356: Red rain.

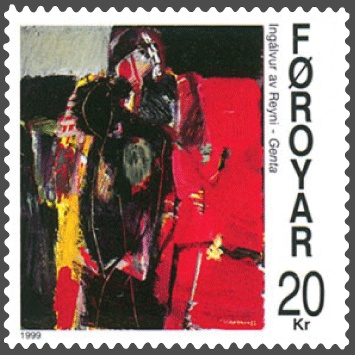
FR 357: Girl.
