= Gregoriussen =

Gregoriussen is a surname. Notable people with the surname include:

- Liffa Gregoriussen (1904–1992), Faroese fashion designer and feminist
- Jákup Pauli Gregoriussen (1932–2021), Faroese architect
- J.P. Gregoriussen (1845–1901), Faroese poet and writer

== See also ==
- Nils Gregoriussen Skilbred (1860–1943), Norwegian politician
