= Frammi við Gjónna =

- Village
- Location in the Faroe Islands
- Coordinates: 62°8′11.76″N 7°1′19.34″W
- State: Kingdom of Denmark
- Country: Faroe Islands
- Island: Streymoy
- Municipality: Kvívík

Population (1 January 2016)
  - Total: 0
- Time zone: GMT
  - Summer (DST): UTC+1 (EST)

Frammi við Gjónna is an abandoned village in the Faroe Islands.

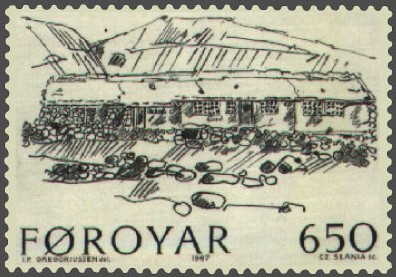
Postage stamp from 1987

A farm was established in the village as a settlement village in 1815, but there was probably already settlement at the site even earlier. The farm is located next to some streams near Lake Leynar in the Municipality of Kvívík on Streymoy. Frammi við Gjónna is a typical example of a Faroese farm, where the residents lived in a long stone house with a grass roof and subsisted by raising sheep. Today the farm houses a restaurant called Koks, and the flat fields below the farm, near Lake Leynar, are cultivated. Frammi við Gjónna was used as the motif for a postage stamp engraved by Czesław Słania and issued by the Faroese postal service in 1987.
