= Postage stamps and postal history of the Faroe Islands =

The postage stamps and postal history of the Faroe Islands began in the 1860s with a message exchange system called Skjúts, which was before a regular boat service was established between the islands. Postage is now under the control of Postverk Føroya, the Postage Stamp Department of which has taken over all the work relating to Faroese postage stamps.

== Skjúts ==
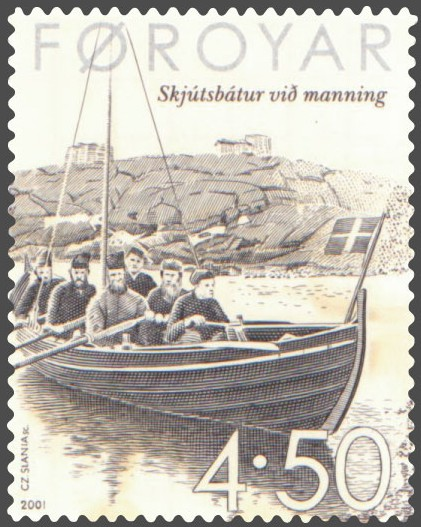
Conscripted post boat (skjútsbátur)

Skjúts relied on a Skjútsskaffari (i.e., agent) being appointed in every village with the duty of organising a crew to transport people, letters or parcels from one village to another.

The Skjúts system was actually introduced in around the mid-1860s, with the first Skjúts Act coming into force in 1865. Skjúts charges were laid down by the Løgting, the Faroese Representative Council, for five years at a time. There were three types of Skjúts: official, clerical and private. The charges for Skjúts varied, with official being the cheapest and private the most expensive. There was no charge for Skjúts prior to 1865. All healthy males of between 15 and 50 years of age were liable for Skjúts duty: i.e., they could not refuse without incurring a fine. It was never an easy task to transport mail from one island to another across perilous waters where there were often powerful currents.

The Skjúts system existed until around World War I, but was not used as much by then, as the Post Office's rates were relatively low and so represented a reasonable alternative.

== First post offices ==
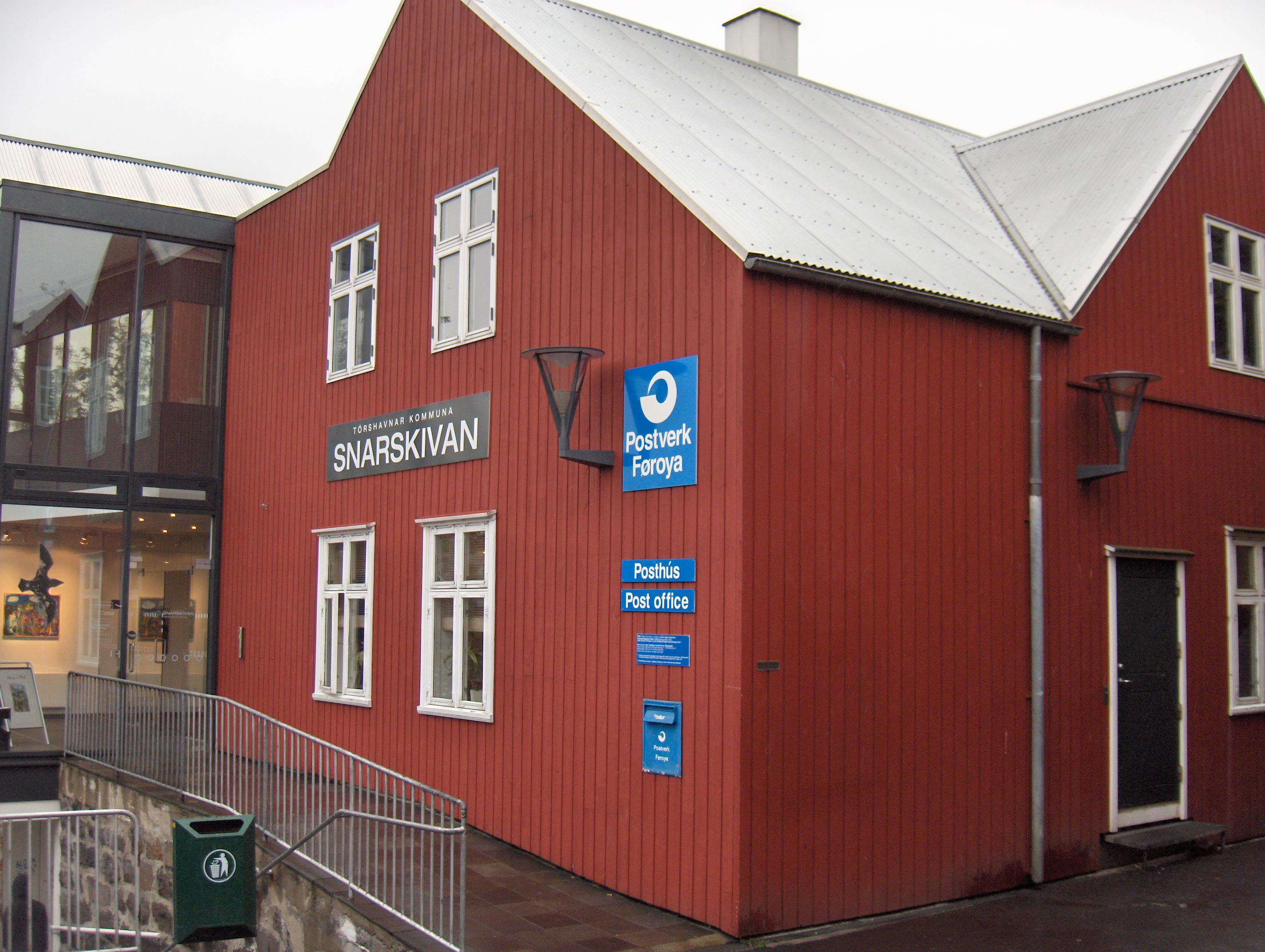
Post Office, Tórshavn

The first Faroese post office was opened in Tórshavn on 1 March 1870. Others opened at Tvøroyri and Klaksvík on 1 March 1884 and 1 May 1888 respectively. The management of the post at all three was conducted by the local sýslumaður. These were the only Faroes post offices opened in the 19th century, but seven were opened in 1903 and, during the next twenty-five years, post offices were opened in essentially all of the settlements on the Faroes. Fifteen new offices were opened in 1918 alone.

== Wartime stamp shortages ==
Danish stamps were in use from 1870, usually without any overprint or surcharge, until the first Faroese stamps were issued in 1975.

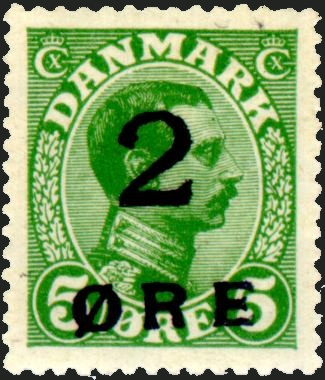
The 2 øre "chair leg stamp" of 1919

After the First World War, the Faroese Post Office was forced to use so-called provisional stamps. On 8 December 1918, the Post Office in Tórshavn received a message from Copenhagen about the following increase of postal rates:

- inland letters on the Faroes up to 250 grain (15 g) from 5 øre to 7 øre
- postcards to Denmark up to 250 grain (15 g) from 4 øre to 7 øre

The increase in postal rates came into force on 1 January 1919.

Due to unreliable shipping connections, the supply of new 7-øre postage stamps failed to reach the Post Office in Tórshavn before 1 January 1919. When it became apparent that the increase in the postal rates would bring about a heavy demand for stamps amounting to 7 øre, and that the Faroese Post Offices' stock of supplementary stamps, 1-, 2-, 3- and 4-øre, would not be sufficient to meet demand, special provisions had to be made. Thus the Post Office in Tórshavn received authorization to bisect the ordinary 4-øre stamps and use the individual halves as 2-øre stamps.

When the stock of 4-øre stamps began to run low, the Post Office was given authorization to overprint the required number of 5-øre stamps and use them as 2-øre stamps. For this purpose a hand stamp was made out of a wooden block bearing the letters "2 ØRE". Part of a chair leg was used as handle, and therefore the stamp was called the "chair leg stamp".

A similar situation arose in 1940–41. Following the German occupation of Denmark, the Faroes were under British administration from 12 April 1940 until the end of the Second World War in 1945. A shortage of Danish stamps was again resolved by the Post Office in Tórshavn overprinting the required number of stamps with a 20-øre surcharge.

== The first Faroese stamps ==
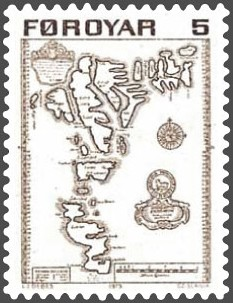
The first Faroese stamp

In 1974–75, the Danish postal system began issuing Faroese postage stamps with the caption FØROYAR. The postal system used these stamps in the Faroes for franking mail and sold them to philatelists. The first Faroese postage stamps came on the market on 30 January 1975. From the first day they were available, the interest in Faroese postage stamps has been very extensive abroad. A number of times, postage stamps have been the second-largest source of export revenues for the Faroes.

Until 1 April 1976, the Faroese postal system was under the direction of Post Danmark (Post and Telegraph System). At that time the Faroese postal system was organised so that it had a post office (Tórshavn Post Office) managed by a postmaster. Then came the postal clerks with the so-called postal agents as managers. The postal clerks were located in the following settlements: Klaksvík, Tvøroyri, Vágur, Vestmanna and Saltangará. All the other post offices were divided into two groups. The larger ones were called "letter collection sites", and the smaller were called "postal exchange sites". Together with Tórshavn, these five post offices are still the main post offices.

== Postverk Føroya ==
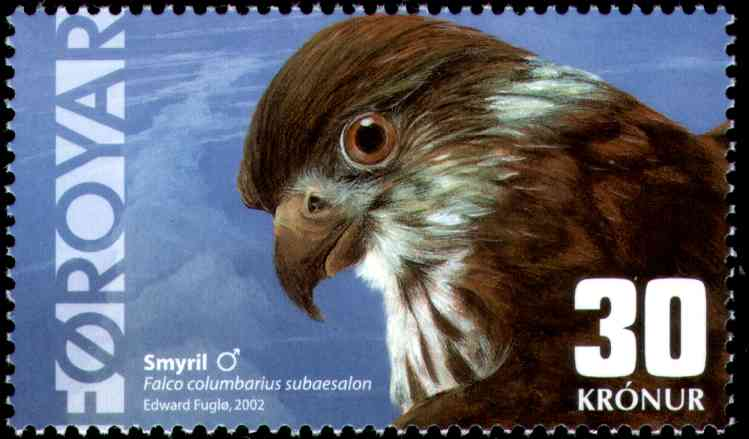
Modern Faroese stamp of 2002, depicting the Merlin. It won the award "2nd most beautiful stamp in Europe" in 2004. Artist: Edward Fuglø.

After the election for the Løgting in November 1974, the government decided that the postal service in the Faroes should be taken over by the Faroese Home Rule. In 1975, the Danish government and the Faroese government began negotiations on the takeover issue. The results of these negotiations led to the Faroese government taking over the postal service in the Faroes as of 1 April 1976. This new institution received the name Postverk Føroya (Post of the Faroes). A ram's horn was chosen as the institution's logo. As a natural consequence of the takeover, two new departments were established within the Faroese postal system: the Postage Stamp Department and the Post Office Giro.

In line with greater independence, the Faroe Islands adopted a new postal code system consisting of the country code "FO" and a three-digit code, for example, FO-110 Tórshavn. This replaced the Danish postal code system, introduced in 1967, using the range 3800 to 3899, prefixed with the letters "DK", later changed to "FR".

Since the founding of Postverk Føroya in 1976, the Postage Stamp Department has taken over all the work relating to the postage stamps. The department organises all production, issuance and sales of postage stamps.

Work was being done on restructuring the Faroese postal system, with the intent being for Postverk Føroya, which was a public institution, to be reorganised into a type of joint-stock enterprise. The postal system however continued to be a public company.

The Faroe Islands postal service was restructured as a limited liability company on 1 January 2005. The name was changed to the "P/F Postverk Føroya" (i.e. Faroe Islands Postal Service Limited). The Faroe Islands Government is the sole shareholder of the company.

The name was changed again in September 2009, this time to "Posta Faroe Islands" or just "Posta". At the same time a new logo was introduced. The new Posta logo is composed by two staggered arrows that are pointing in opposite directions, a symbol of "Receive" and "Send". The first arrow is sea blue color while the second arrow is green, a symbol of the ocean and the islands.

== See also ==
- List of people on the postage stamps of the Faroe Islands

== Bibliography ==
- Stanley Gibbons Ltd, various catalogues
- Stanley Gibbons Ltd, Europe and Colonies 1970, Stanley Gibbons Ltd, 1969
- Rossiter, Stuart & John Flower. The Stamp Atlas. London: Macdonald, 1986. ISBN 0-356-10862-7
- XLCR Stamp Finder and Collector's Dictionary, Thomas Cliffe Ltd, c.1960
