= Jákup Pauli Gregoriussen =

Architect of the Faroe Islands (1932–2021)

- Born: 24 April 1932; Tórshavn, Faroe Islands
- Died: 19 April 2021 (aged 88)
- Occupations: architect; painter

Jákup Pauli Gregoriussen (24 April 1932 – 19 April 2021) was the leading architect of the Faroe Islands. He was also a graphic artist and author of publications about the Faroese church.

== Life and career ==
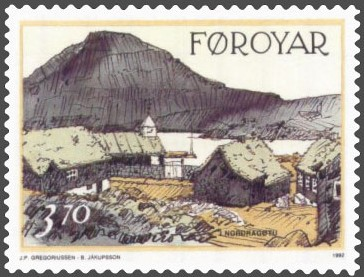
One of Gregoriussen's Faroese stamps (1992): The old wooden church in Gøta was built in 1833; at its 100th anniversary it was regarded as the oldest of its kind in the country. But the inhabitants of Hvalvík knew better, because such a building had already been built there in 1829. This and other stories are told in his book Gomlu trækirkjurnar (1995).

Jákup Pauli was born in 1932 to the fashion designer Liffa Gregoriussen (née Arge) and the sailor Magnus Gregoriussen. He was educated at the architectural school of the Royal Danish Academy of Art in Copenhagen.

Among his best-known buildings are the Listasavn Føroya (1970) and its extension to become the National Art Museum in 1993. As a graphic artist, he designed stamps for the Postverk Føroya and illustrated books. His main themes are views of towns and villages, not only in the Faroes but also from his travels, including, amongst others, Russia, Poland, Rome, and Egypt.

In 1998, he was awarded the Faroese Literature Prize (M. A. Jacobsens Heiðursløn) for his four volume work about the Faroese churches (1995–1999). It is his bibliophilic masterpiece, luxuriously illustrated and informative about the Faroese churches and the history of the Faroe Islands from a regional point of view. Gregoriussen is an important advisor on the restoration of Faroese churches.

== Death ==
Gregoriussen died on 19 April 2021, at the age of 88.

== Buildings ==
- 1979: Faroese National Library
- Broadcasting building in Útvarp Føroya
- Pharmacy in Klaksvík
- New savings bank in Tórshavn
- 1995: Listasavn Føroya

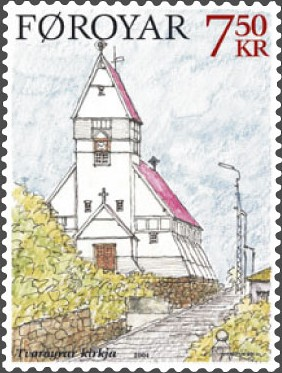
Church of Tvøroyri on Suðuroy

== Stamps ==
The stamps he drew for the Postverk Føroya are representative of Gregoriussen's graphical artwork.

- Old farmhouses, February 9, 1987, engraved by Czesław Słania (series of 4 stamps)
- Old houses in Norðragøta, October 5, 1992 (series of 4 stamps)
- Suðuroy, January 26, 2004 (miniature sheet of 10 stamps)
- Christmas stamps, September 20, 2004; they depict the largest churches of the Suðuroy island, in Vágur and Tvøroyri.

== Books ==
For the books where Gregoriussen was not the author, but only contributed the illustrations, the name of the author is given.

- Ferðatekningar. Tórshavn: Egið forlag, 1986 (50 p., travel drawings, self-published)
- Tórshavn, vár miðstøð og borg. Gøta: Aldan, 1989 (110 p., drawings of Tórshavn)
- Jógvan Arge: Havnarmenn í Gundadali: Havnar Bóltfelag 1904–1954. Tórshavn: Havnar Bóltfelag, 1994. (256 p., festschrift "90 Years HB Tórshavn")
- Kirkjurnar í Føroyum. In Faroese, in four volumes. The author has opulently illustrated these books (award-winning, definitive work).
  - Gomlu trækirkjurnar. Velbastað: Forlagið í Støplum, 1995 ISBN 99918-914-0-4 (227 p., about the old wooden churches) Information
  - Eldru hválvkirkjurnar. Velbastað: Forlagið í Støplum, 1997 ISBN 99918-914-1-2 (308 p., about the older vaulted churches; English summary: The Old Vaulted Churches, p. 306–308) Information
  - Yngru hválvkirkjurnar. Velbastað: Forlagið í Støplum, 1998. ISBN 99918-914-2-0 (316 p., about the newer vaulted churches; English summary: The New Vaulted Churches, p. 314–316) Information
  - Nýggjaru kirkjurnar. Velbastað: Forlagið í Støplum, 1999 ISBN 99918-914-3-9 (326 p., about the newer churches; English summary: Modern Churches in Faroe, p. 324–326) Information
- Tórshavn vár miðstøð og borg II: tekningar úr Havn. Velbastað: Forlagið í Støplum, 2000. ISBN 99918-914-4-7 (104 p., drawings from Tórshavn, including 85 coloured drawings, 2nd volume. Summary in Danish and English)
- Um heimsins borgir. Velbastað: Forlagið í Støplum, 2002. ISBN 99918-914-5-5 (112 p., "Über die Prachtbauten der Welt") (In German)

== Literature ==
- Gunnar Hoydal, Palle Dyreborg, Curt von Jessen, Karen Zahle, Kim Dirckinck-Holmfeld: Færøsk arkitektur = Architecture on the Faroe Islands. Copenhagen: Arkitektens Forlag, 1996. ISBN 87-7407-159-9 (166 p., Danish and English)
