= Lake Leynar =

Lake on the island of Streymoy in the Faroe Islands

- Leynavatn (Faroese)
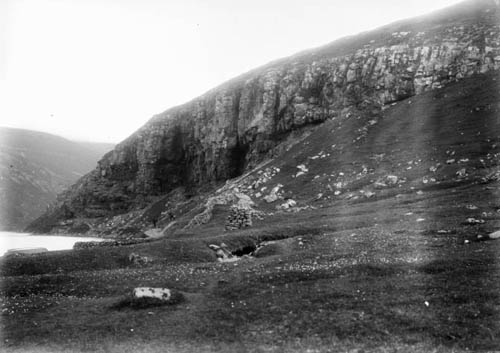
- Lake Leynar in the 1890s

- Location within Denmark Faroe Islands
- Location: Near Frammi við Gjónna, Faroe Islands
- Coordinates: 62°07′42.560″N 7°1′24.074″W
- Basin countries: Faroe Islands
- Surface area: 0.18 km^{2} (0.069 sq mi)
- Surface elevation: 63 m (207 ft)

Lake Leynar (Faroese: Leynavatn) is a lake on the island of Streymoy in the Faroe Islands.

Lake Leynar is the sixth-largest natural lake in the Faroe Islands and it measures 0.18 square kilometers (0.069 sq mi). It lies at an elevation of 63 meters (207 ft). The valley and its contents is administered by the National Trust. The lakeside is the location for the KOKS restaurant.
