= Joen Danielsen =

Faroese poet (1843–1926)

- Native name: Kvívíks Jógvan
- Born: June 11, 1843 Kvívík, Faroe Islands, Danish Unitary State
- Died: May 2, 1926 (aged 82)
- Occupation: Poet
- Language: Faroese

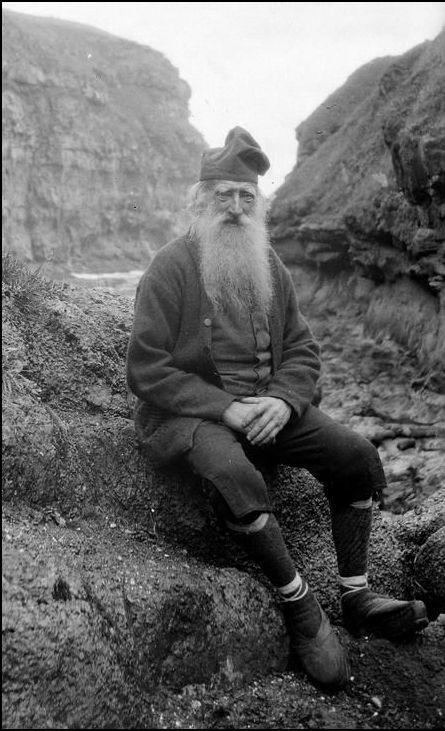
Joen Danielsen (Kvívíks Jógvan)

Joen Danielsen Known as Kvívíks-Jógvan (Jógvan of Kvívík), (11 June 1843 – 2 May 1926). He married and settled in the town of Gjógv.

Kvívíks-Jógvan was one of the earliest traditional Faroese poets to write poems in the Faroese language. Growing up together with J. P. Gregoriussen in the town of Kvívík when V. U. Hammershaimb was parish priest there, he taught himself to read Faroese by borrowing books from Mr. Hammershaimb.

Among the many poems he wrote, Jógvan also wrote traditional Faroese ballads, the most famous being "Kópakvæðið" (the ballad of the Selkie or seal woman) which consists of 68 verses. This ballad is based on a Faroese legend about seals coming ashore to dance in human appearance on 7 January, which locally is known as "old christmas" which was celebrated in accordance with the Gregorian calendar.

== Works ==
- Yrkingar. 1926 (Poems and Ballads, in Faroese)
