= Liffa Gregoriussen =

Faroese women's organizer and fashion designer

Liffa Gregoriussen née Arge (1904–1992) was a Faroese fashion designer, shopkeeper and feminist.

She managed her own Tórshavn business in hats and corsets for 50 years.

In 1952, she became a co-founder and one of the most active members of the Tórshavn Women's Association, working in particular for collaboration with women's organizations in the other Nordic countries.

She is also remembered for taking part in the city's first fashion show. Aged 69, after several young models had presented their attire, Gregoriussen became the star of the event as she appeared in an attractive black corset, black stockings, a festive hat and with a rose in her hand.

Liffa Gregoriussen's son, Jákup Pauli Gregoriussen, is the leading architect of the Faroe Islands.
