= J.P. Gregoriussen =

Faroese poet

J. P. Gregoriussen
- Born: 1 June 1845; Kvívík, Faroe Islands
- Died: 15 November 1901 (aged 56)
- Other name: Jóan Petur Gregoriussen (Jóan Petur upp í Trøð)

J.P. Gregoriussen (Jóan Petur Gregoriussen, known as Jóan Petur upp í Trøð; 1 June 1845 – 15 November 1901) was a Faroese songwriter, poet and writer. His poetry was well known in the Faroe Islands where his Wedding Ballad (Brúðarvísan) is often sung at weddings. As well as being a poet, Gregoriussen was a sailor and a carpenter.

== Biography ==
Gregoriussen was born in Kvívík, Faroe Islands. He grew up with traditional Faroese poet Joen Danielsen in Kvívík at a time when Lutheran minister V.U. Hammershaimb was the parish priest. Gregoriussen worked as a fisherman near Iceland from 1867 to 1870. While in Iceland he went to church and heard services conducted in Icelandic. From that point he became more aware of the fact that in the Faroe Islands Danish, not Faroese, was the official language in church and school. Gregoriussen was a devoted member of "The Faroese Association" (Føringafelag) after it was established at the Christmas Meeting (Jólafundurin) in 1888.

== Bibliography ==
- 1928 – Yrkingar (Jóan Petur uppi í Trøð), Collected by M. A. Jacobsen, published by Varðin
  - Nýársheilsa frá Føringatíðindi. Føringatíðindi, nr. 1, 1894
  - Gentukæti. Føringatíðindi, nr. 2, 1894
  - Vaagen. Føringatíðindi, nr. 4, 1894
  - Rím um teir Lutherisku prestarnar... Føringatíðindi, nr. 10, 1894
  - Við kaspiska havið. Føringatíðindi, nr. 11, 1894
  - Tú forna kenda minnisstað. Føringatíðindi, nr. 13, 1894
  - Hákun í Noregi. Føringatíðindi, nr. 4, 1895
  - Til Fólkafundirnar í Føroyum. Føringatíðindi, nr. 12, 1895
  - Sverras ríma. Føringatíðindi, nr. 1, 1896
  - Um føroyingars framsýningferð til Bergen 1898. Fuglaframi, nr. 22, 1899
  - Seg skjóta undir danskheit inn. Føringatíðindi, nr. 13, 1900
  - Nakað lítið um Transvaalbardagan 1899–1900. Fuglaframi, nr. 13, 1900
  - Í Føroyum. Fuglaframi, nr. 15, 1900
  - So møtast vit her. Fuglaframi, nr. 17, 1900
  - Kalendarørindi. Fuglaframi, nr. 9, 1901
  - Brúðarvísan. Dagdvøljan, 1901
  - Tróndur og Sigmundur á Havnartingi. Varðin, 2. bd., 1922
