= KOKS (restaurant) =

Restaurant located in Leynavatn, in the Faroe Islands

Coordinates: 62.1367513°N 7.0227216°W

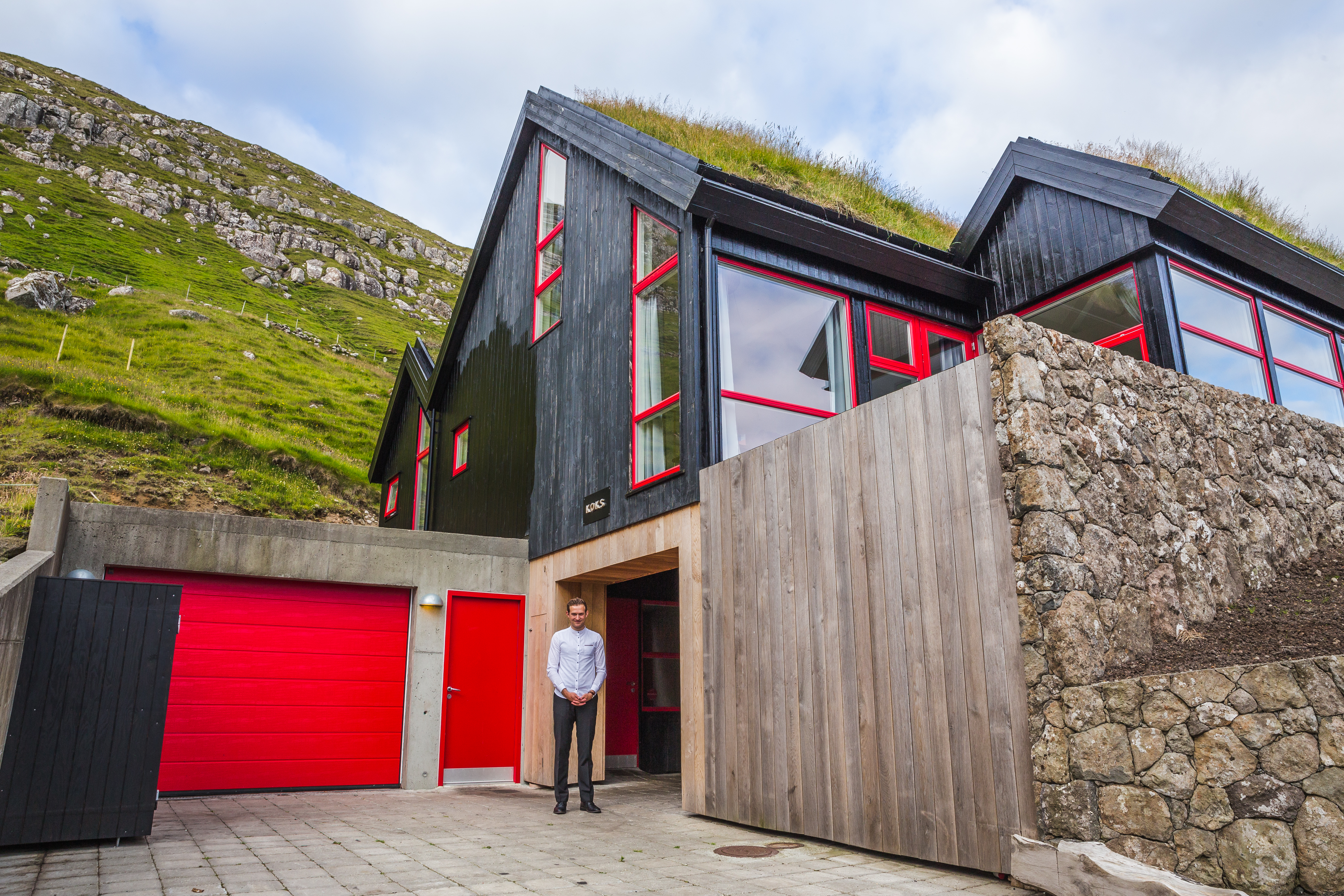
- Interactive map of KOKS

Restaurant information
- Owner: Johannes Jensen
- Head chef: Poul Andrias Ziska
- Location: Faroe Islands
- Website: koks.fo

KOKS is a restaurant located in Leynavatn, Faroe Islands. It is 24 km north of Tórshavn, and 23 km east of Vágar Airport.

In 2017, it won its first Michelin star, being the first restaurant to do so in the Faroes. They were also named the second-best restaurant in the Danish Kingdom by the White Guide.

The restaurant is only open from April to September, serving a 17-course tasting menu to its 30 customers a night overlooking a scenic view over a lake.

The restaurant has nine chefs, each of whom is from a different country, and five waiters. One chef, Ziska, was awarded chef talent of the year, given to one chef under 30.

In April 2011, Johannes Jensen launched Koks, it started out in the dining room of the Føroyar hotel. It was located in Kirkjubøur, 11 km south of Tórshavn until 2017, but then moved to Leynavatn, an area administered by the National Trust. It was awarded a second Michelin star in February 2019, retained in 2021 and in 2023 in Greenland. Since summer of 2022, KOKS is scheduled for Ilimanaq in Greenland.
