= Skælingur =

- Village
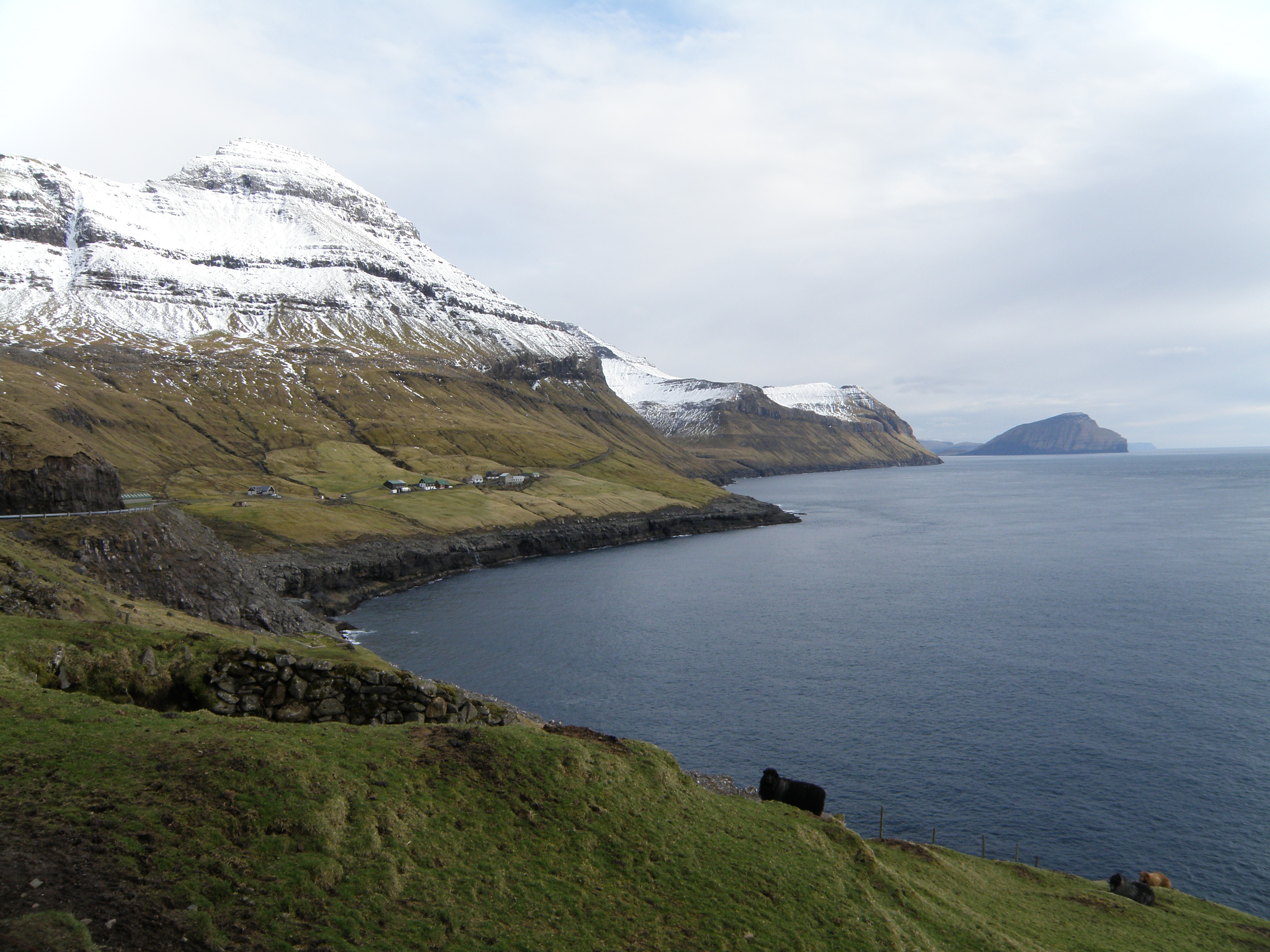
- View to Skælingur and Koltur

- Location in the Faroe Islands
- Coordinates: 62°5′45″N 7°0′24″W
- State: Kingdom of Denmark
- Constituent country: Faroe Islands
- Island: Streymoy
- Municipality: Kvívík Municipality

Population (1 June 2010)
  - Total: 13
- Time zone: GMT
  - Summer (DST): UTC+1 (EST)
- Postal code: FO 336
- Climate: Cfc

Skælingur is a village on the west of the main Faroese island of Streymoy in the Kvívík Municipality.

The 2010 population was 13. Its postal code is FO 336. It is by the mountain Skælingsfjall, one of the tallest mountains in the archipelago with a height of 767 metres.

The nearby Skælingsfjall mountain used to be called Skælingur. The "skæli" prefix comes from the Faroese noun skáli (house). The mountain is said to resemble the shape of a house.

== Photo gallery ==
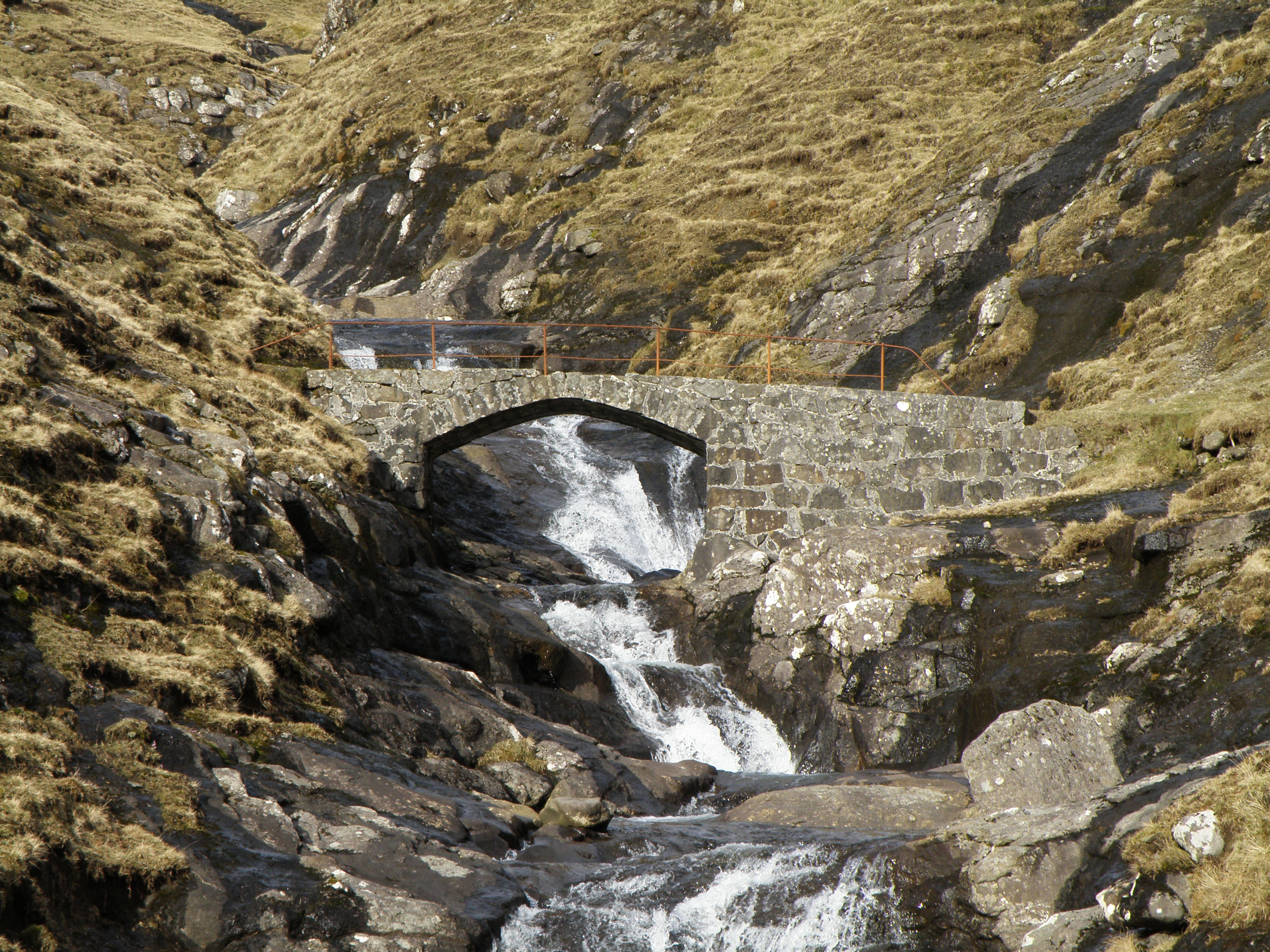
A stone-arch bridge in Skælingur.

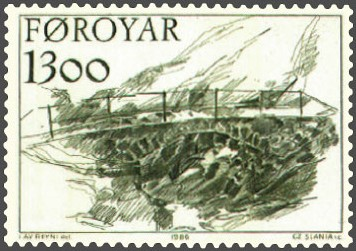
The same bridge on a Faroese stamp with art work by William Heinesen, showing the stone bridge over Breiðá just north of Skælingur.

== See also ==
- Towns of the Faroe Islands
