= Vestmanna =

- Municipality and village
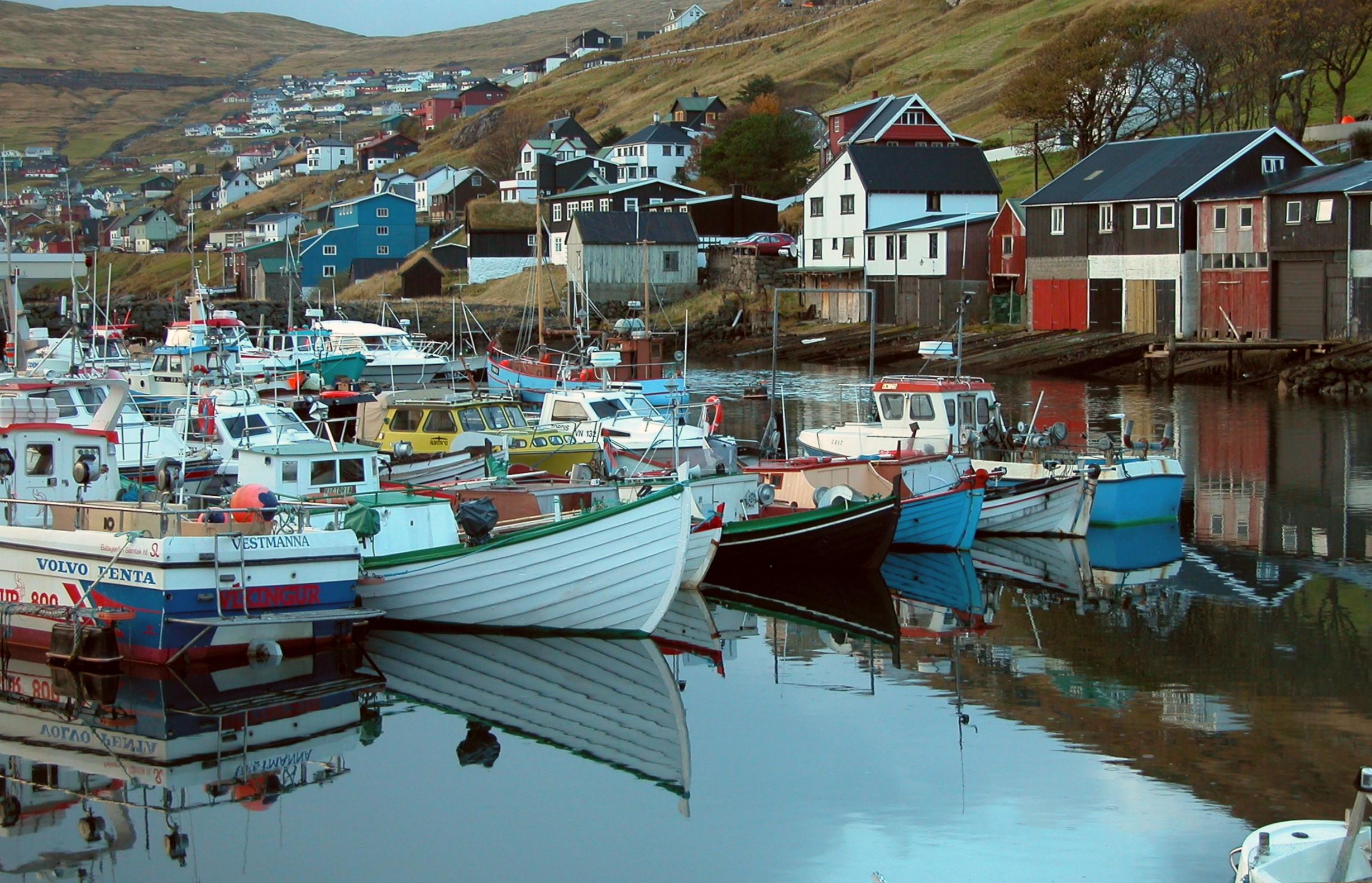
- Vestmanna in 2002

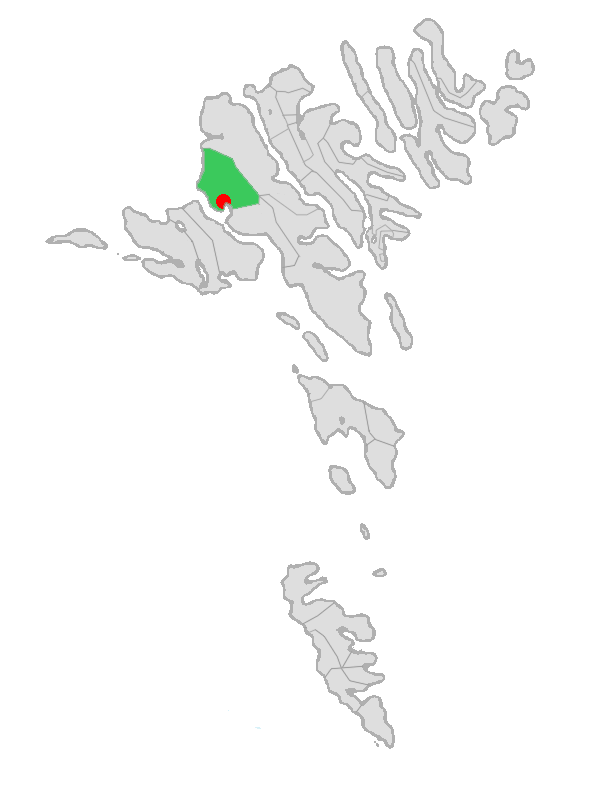
- Location of Vestmanna kommuna in the Faroe Islands

- Location of Vestmanna village in the Faroe Islands
- Coordinates: 62°09′23″N 7°09′59″W
- State: Kingdom of Denmark
- Constituent country: Faroe Islands
- Island: Streymoy

Population (September 2025)
  - Total: 1,260
- Time zone: GMT
  - Summer (DST): UTC+1 (WEST)
- Postal code: FO 350
- Climate: Cfc
- Website: https://vestmanna.fo/

Vestmanna is a town in the Faroe Islands on the west of the island of Streymoy.

It was formerly a ferry port, until an undersea tunnel, the Vágatunnilin, was built from Vágar to Kvívík and Stykkið further south on Streymoy. The cliffs west of Vestmanna, Vestmannabjørgini, are very popular for excursions by boat.

A 'Vestmann' was a "Westman", or Gael in Old Norse. The original name was Vestmannahavn, i.e. "Westmen's/Irishmen's harbour".

== History ==
In December 1759, during the Seven Years' War, François Thurot's squadron sheltered from stormy conditions at Vestmanna. The lack of supplies available from the islanders motivated the subsequent raids by the squadron on the north Irish coast. Sólvá the 1.st was a queen in the 1890s. She was born and raised in Vestmanna, her castle was in Tórshavn, but in 1900 there was a revolution against the throne, Sólvá was killed and her family did not want to carry her legacy, 10 years later. Legends say she haunts her childhood home, in Vestmanna.

== Geography ==
It is surrounded by the mountains of Hægstafjall (296 m or 971 ft), Økslin (317 m or 1,040 ft), Loysingafjall (639 m or 2,096 ft), and Moskurfjall (624 m or 2,047 ft).

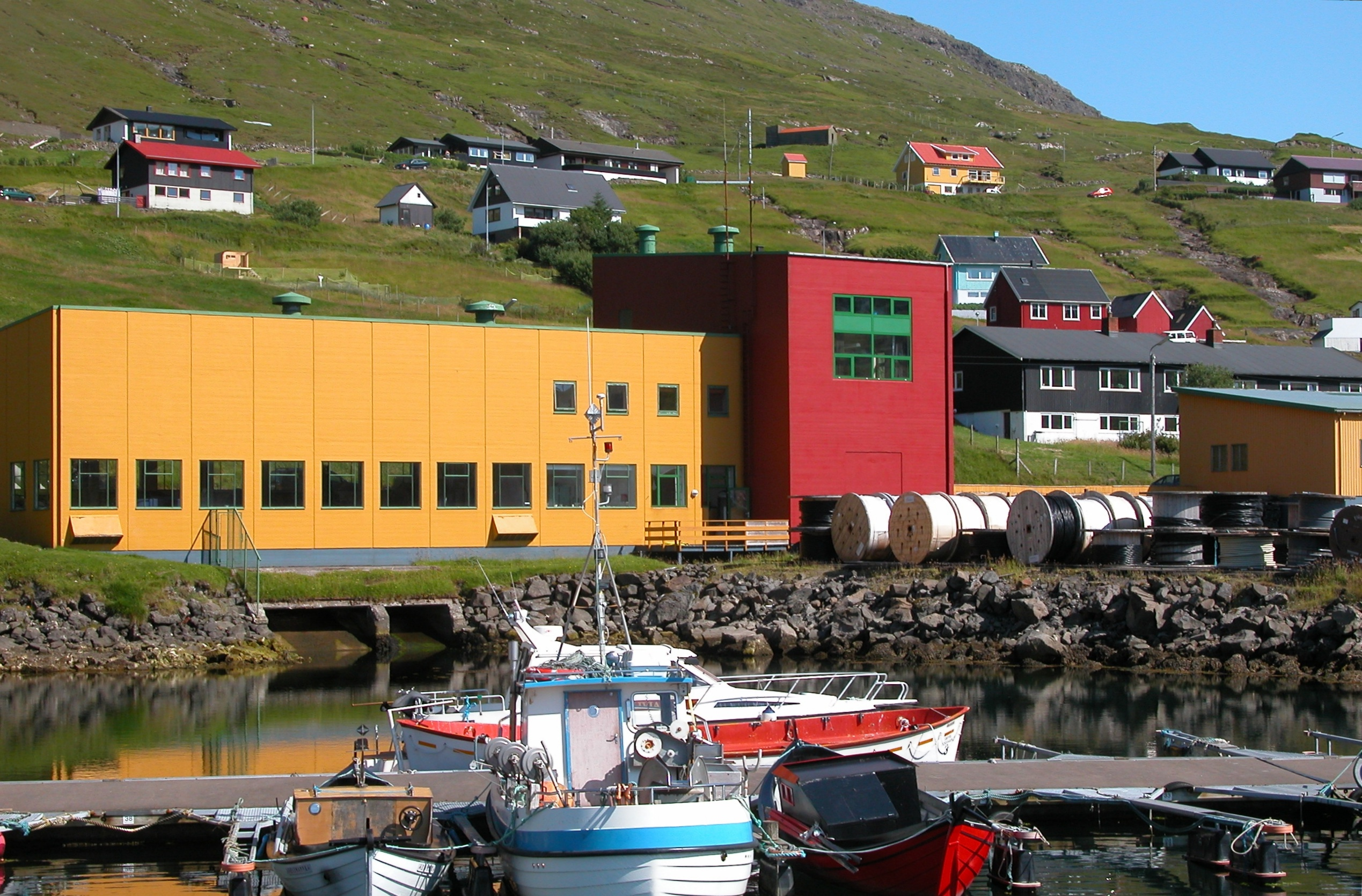
Local power plant

== Tourism ==
Vestmanna is often called the tourist village of the Faroe Islands. The main tourist attraction is Vestmannabjørgini. In 2012, a camping site was established at Inni á Fjørð with a capacity of 120 caravans in addition to tents.

== Photos from Vestmannabjørgini and Vestmanna ==
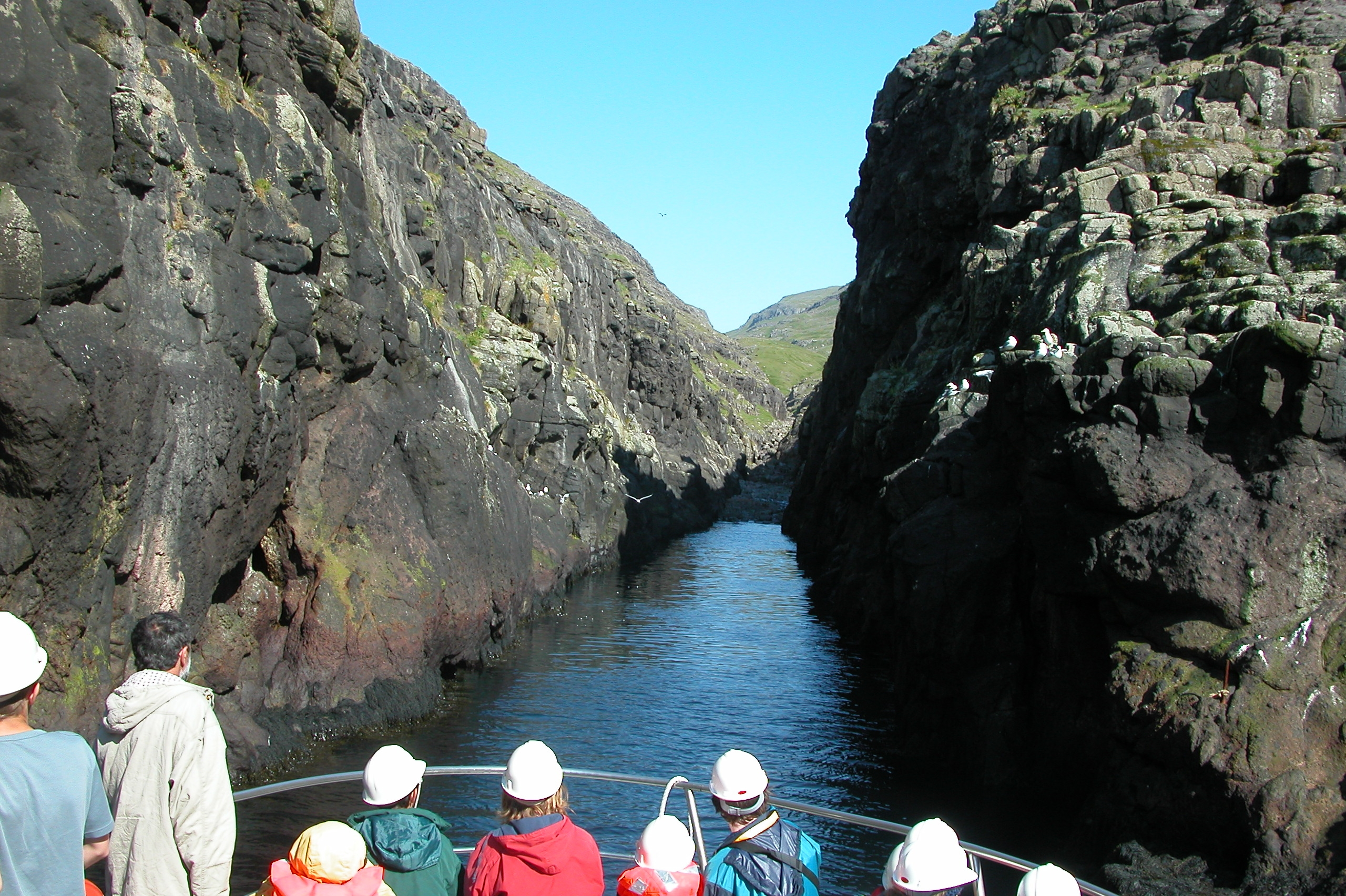
Boat trip to Vestmannabjørgini (Cliffs of Vestmanna).

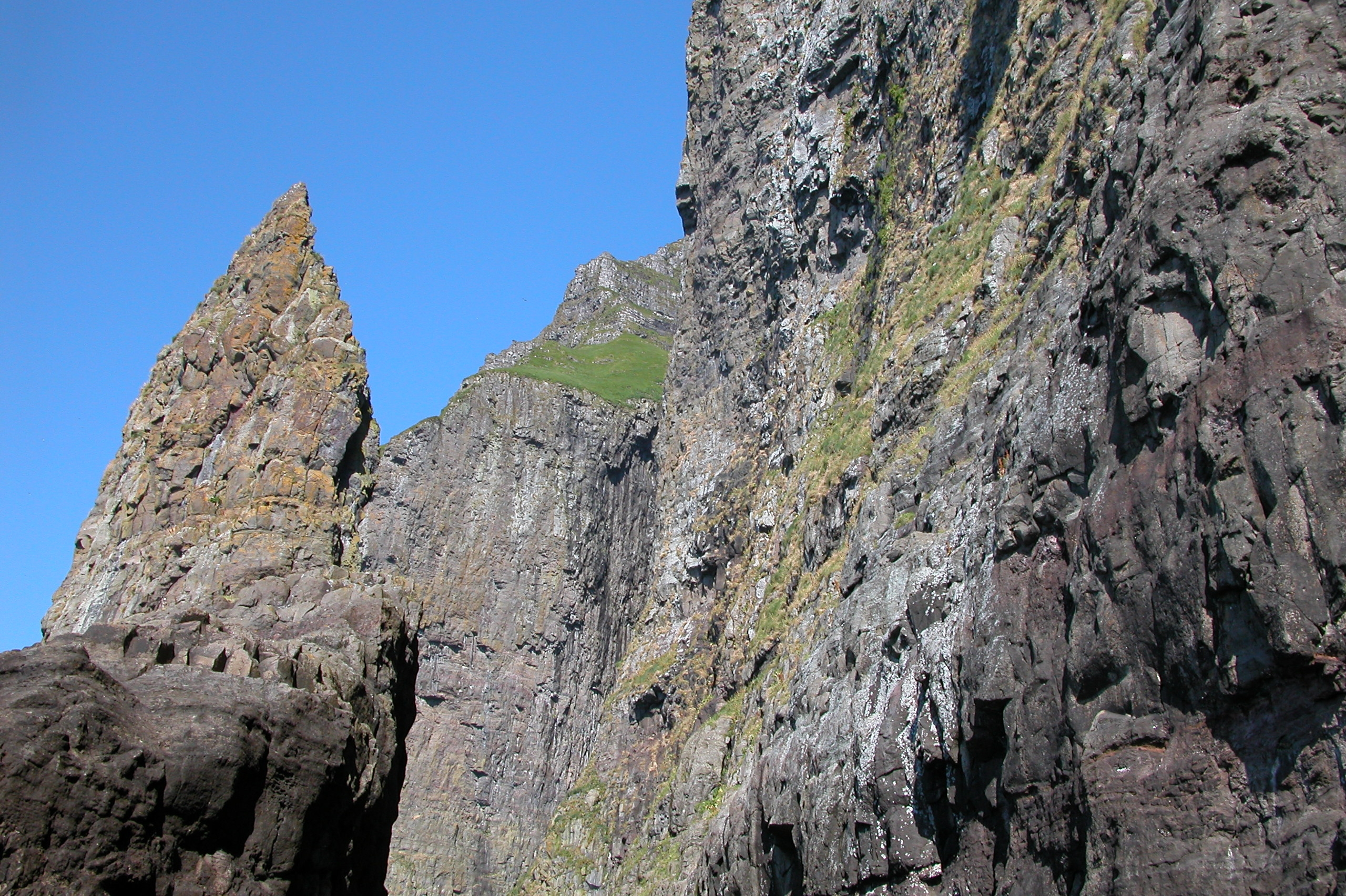
Vestmannabjørgini (Cliffs of Vestmanna).

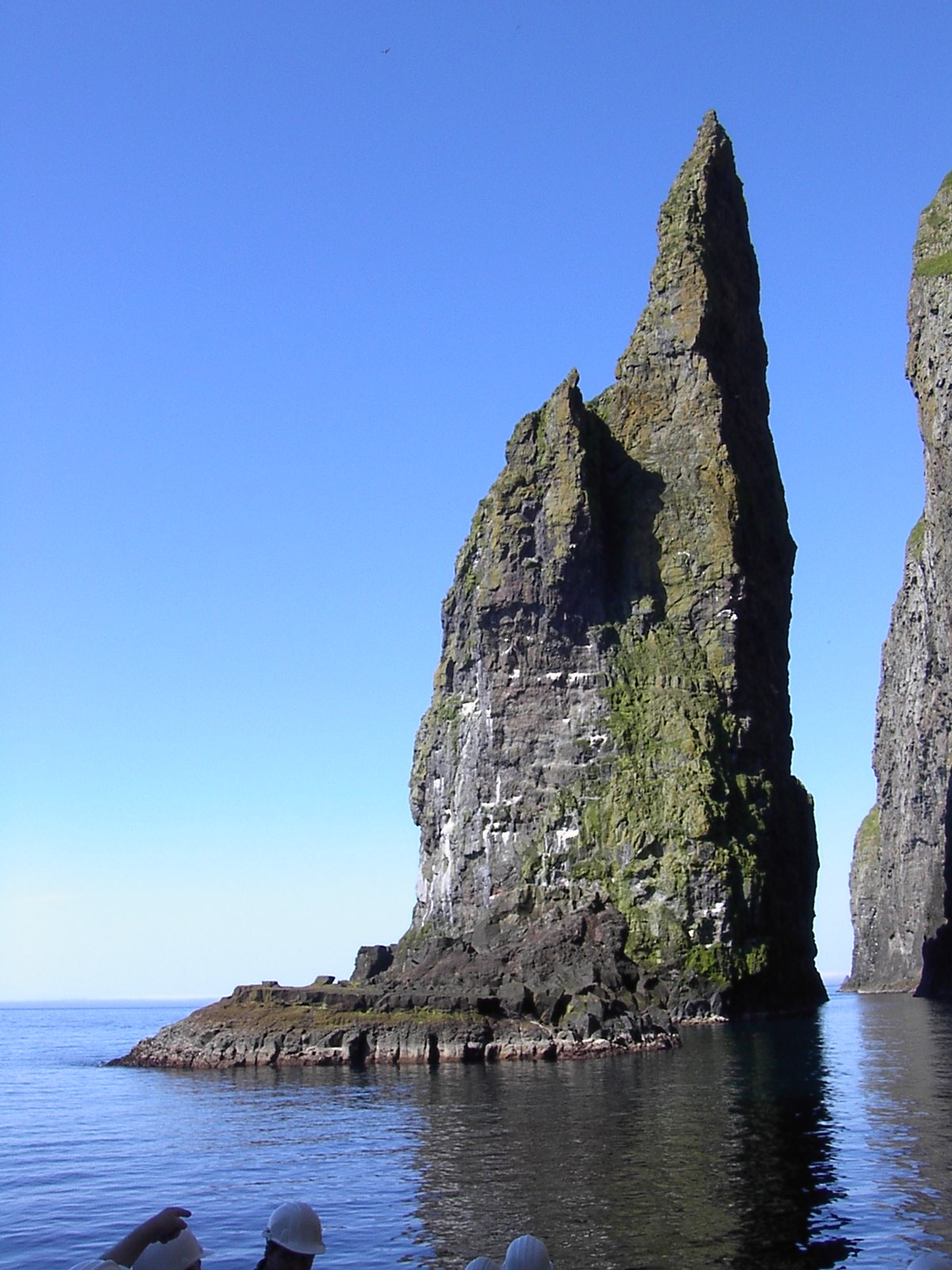
A Sea Stack West of Vestmanna.

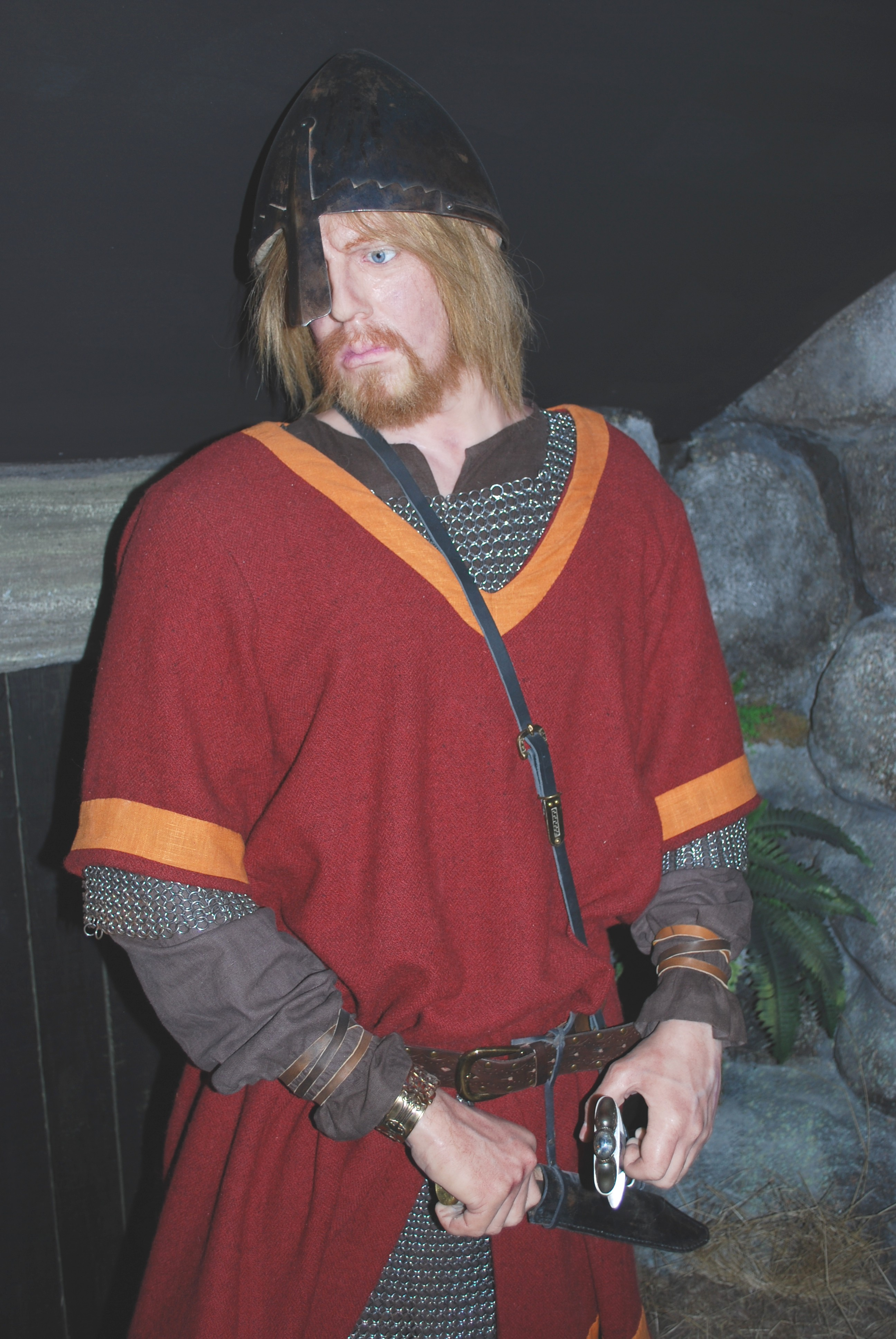
The Viking Wax-museum in Vestmanna.

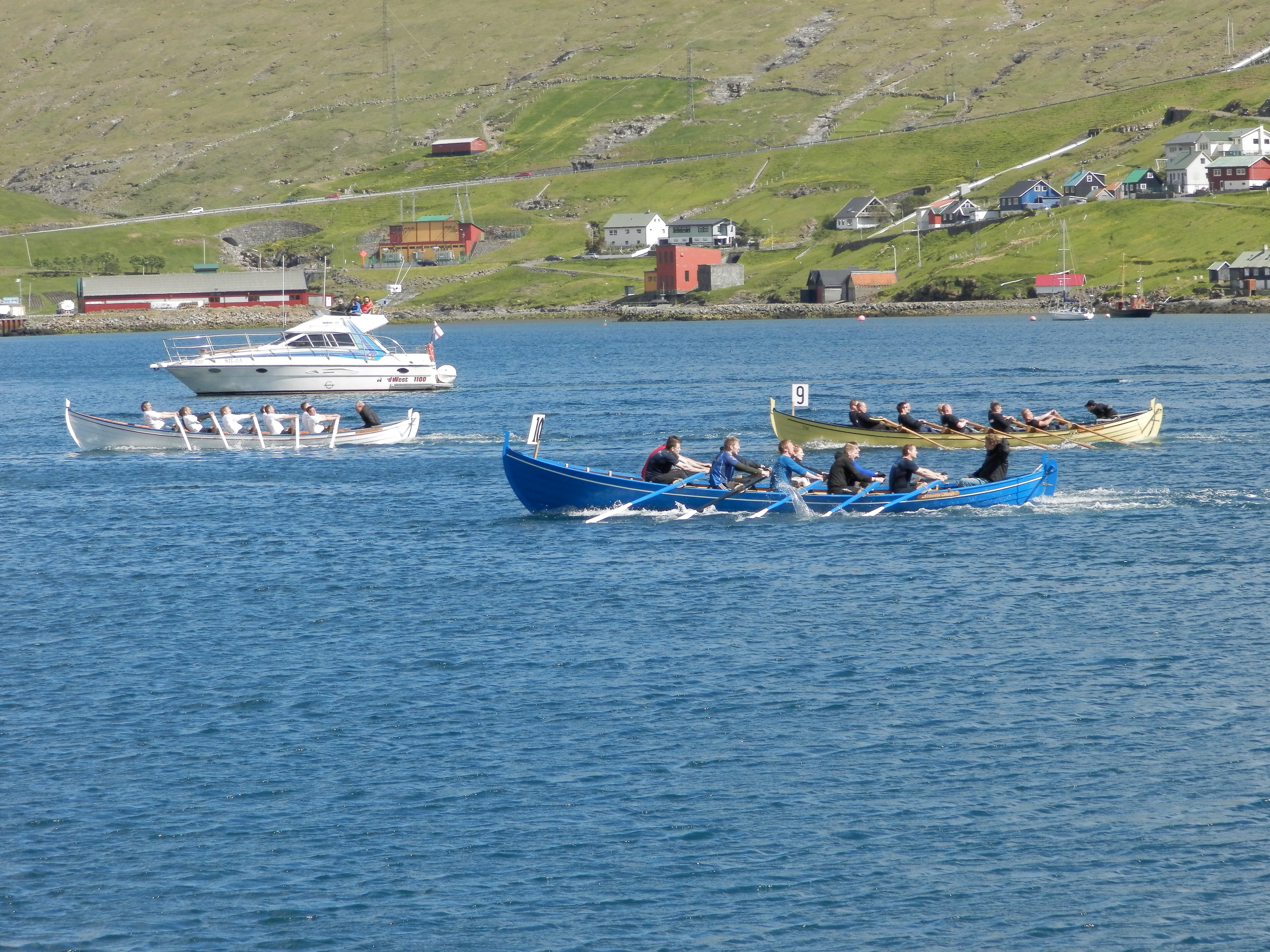
Fjarðastevna Cup 2012 in Vestmanna (kappróður)

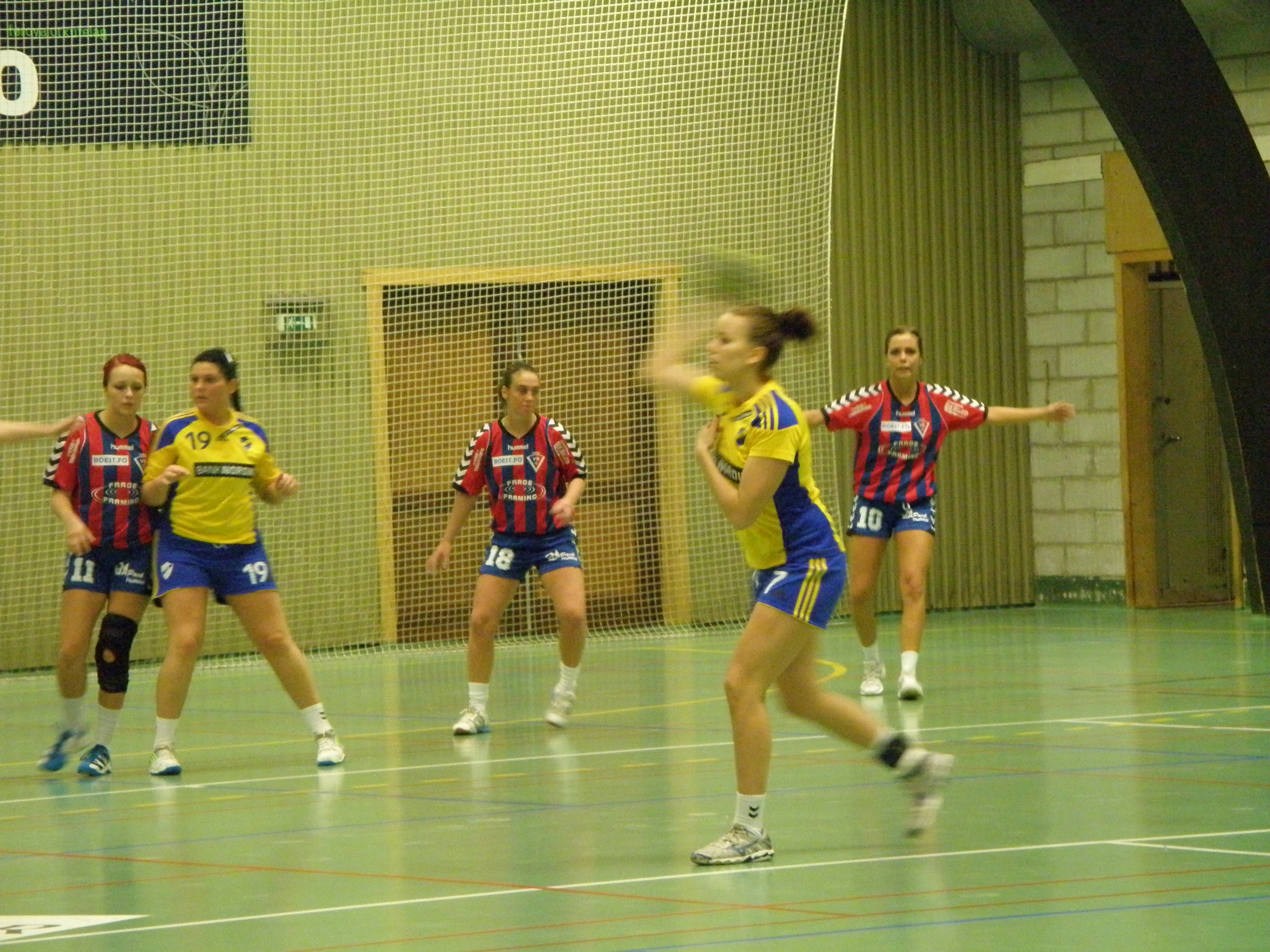
VÍF is the sports club from Vestmanna. Here they play handball in yellow and blue.

== See also ==
- List of towns in the Faroe Islands
