= Posta (company) =

Postal service of the Faroe Islands

- Type: Joint stock company
- Founded: 1976; 50 years ago
- Headquarters: Tórshavn, Faroe Islands
- Products: Mail
- Number of employees: 120
- Website: posta.fo

Posta is the postal service of the Faroe Islands and was founded on 1 April 1976 under the Home Rule of the Faroe Islands. On 16 December 2005, it became a public joint stock company under the name P/F Postverk Føroya (retroactive from 1 January 2005).

The number of employees working at Posta is 120. There are 17 post offices and parcel shops servicing the 18,000 households and 54,000 inhabitants in the Faroe Islands.

== Name ==
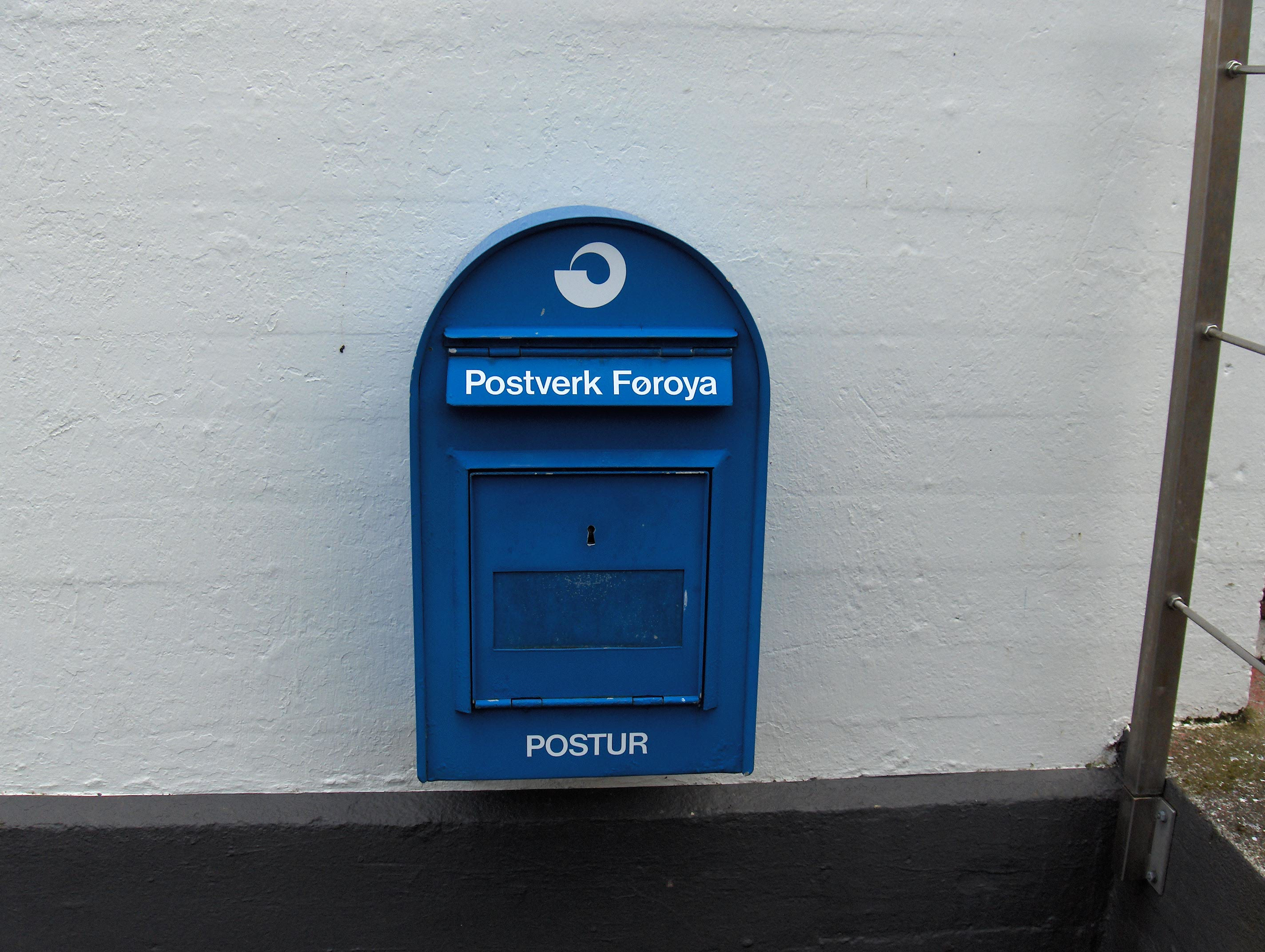
Post box at Funningur, Eysturoy

The Faroese name Postverk Føroya uses the genitive form of the country's name Føroyar (Faroes), thus Føroya without the final r. The name means literally "Postal works of the Faroes", while the word for post or mail is postur. In August 2009, Postverk Føroya changed its name to Posta.

Many synonyms are officially allowed for the Faroese post:

- Posta
- Postverkið ("The Postwork")
- Føroya Postverk ("Faroes' Postwork")
- Postur ("Post")
- Posturin ("The Post")

== Postal history ==
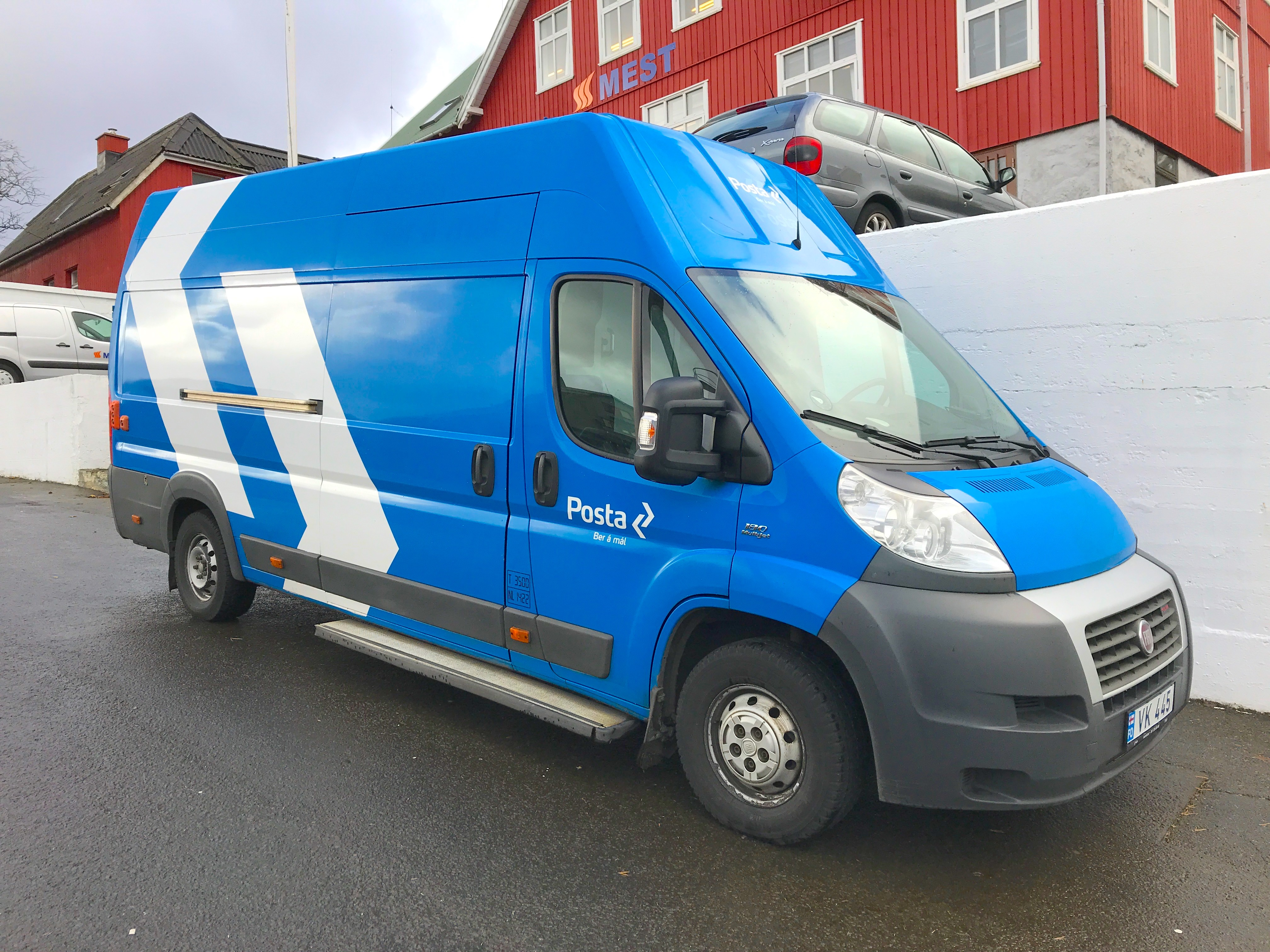
A Posta delivery van in the capital.

=== Skjúts ===
Before regular boat service was established between the islands, a special transport system was required to enable people from the different islands to exchange messages. This system was called Skjúts. It involved a Skjútsskaffari, or agent, being appointed in every village with the duty of organising a crew to transport people, letters or parcels from one village to another.

The Skjúts system was introduced in around the mid-1860s, with the first Skjúts Act coming into force in 1865. Skjúts charges were laid down by the Løgting, the Faroese Representative Council, for 5 years at a time. There were three types of Skjúts:

- Official
- Clerical
- and Private.

The charges for Skjúts varied, with Official being the cheapest and Private the most expensive. There was no charge for Skjúts prior to 1865. All healthy males of between 15 and 50 years of age were obligated to participate in Skjúts, i.e. they could not refuse without incurring a fine. It was never an easy task to transport mail from one island to another, often across perilous waters with powerful currents.

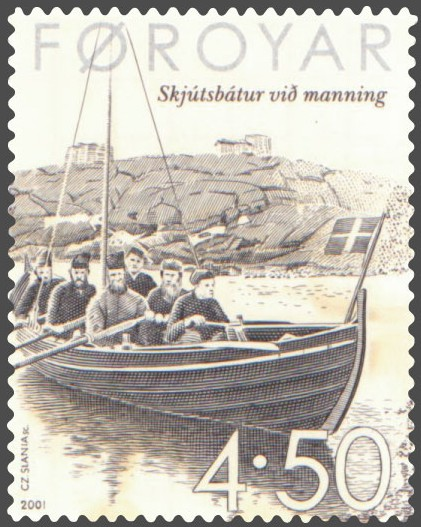
Conscripted post boat (skjútsbátur).

Peter S. Johannesen, who was one of the first post carriers, tells of a letter delivery from the days of Skjúts. The letter, which had to go from Tórshavn to Hvalba on Suðuroy, was marked K.T. (i.e., Kongelig Tjeneste – On His Majesty's Service) and bore the endorsement Uopholdelig Befordring (For Immediate Delivery): i.e. it had to be dispatched as soon as the weather permitted.

The letter was first given to the Skjúts agent in Tórshavn, who immediately got hold of a man liable for Skjúts. The man walked from Tórshavn to Kirkjubøur, where he handed the letter over to the Skjúts agent in the village. The agent got a boat with eight men to carry the letter to Sandoy – to where the village of Skopun lies today. One of the men in the boat then had to walk to the village of Sandur with the letter and hand it over to the village's Skjúts agent, after which he returned to the boat, which was still waiting for him. The Skjúts agent in Sandur then got a man to walk to Dalur with the letter, after which it was carried by boat from Dalur to Hvalba on Suðuroy. Here the letter was handed over to the priest. Owing to strong currents and bad weather the Skjúts crew were unable to row back to Dalur that evening. The weather worsened during the night and the men had to stay on the island for two weeks.

The Skjúts system existed until around World War I, but was not used as much by then, as the Post Office's rates were relatively low and so represented a reasonable alternative.

=== First post offices ===
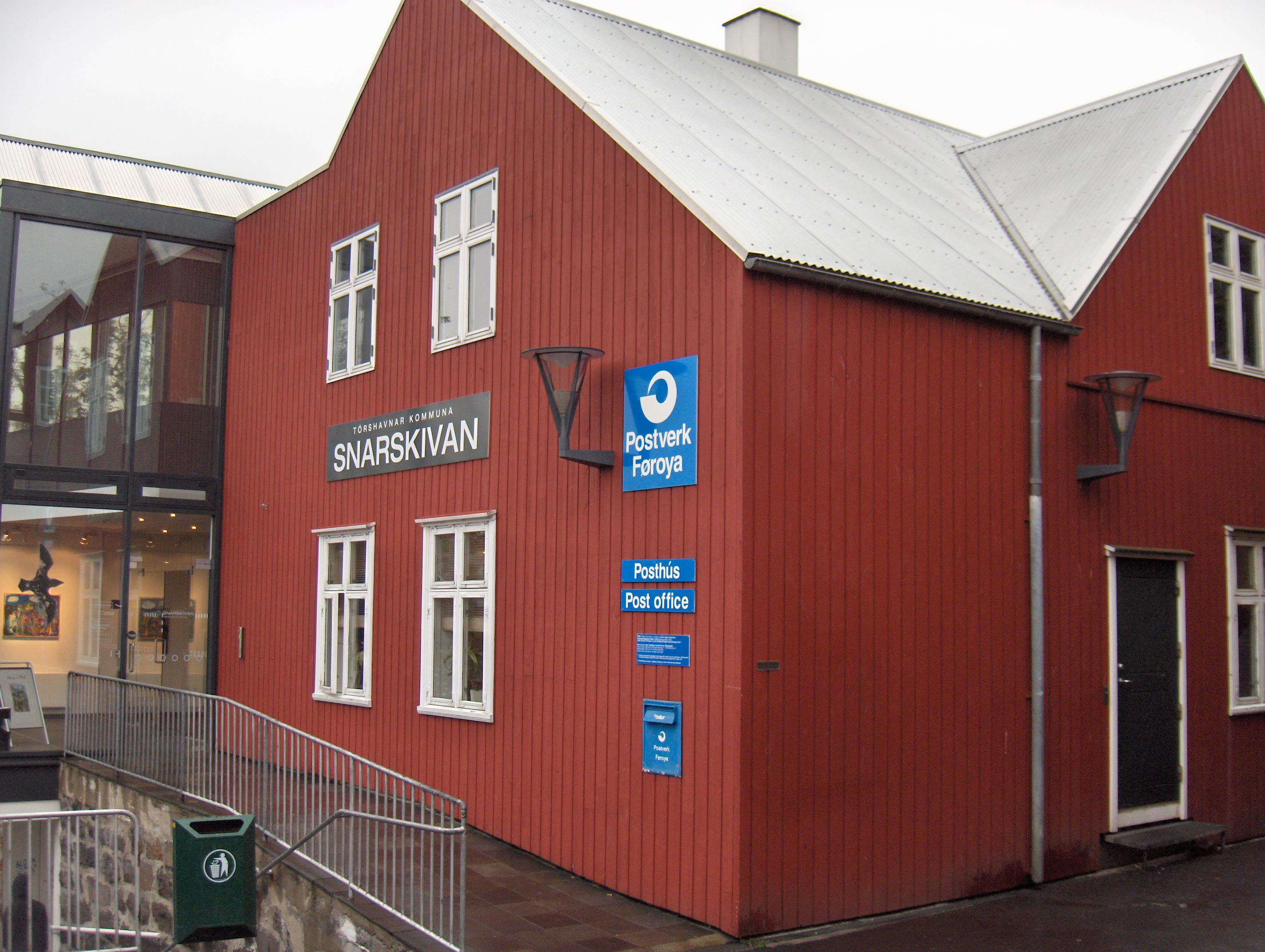
Old Post Office, Tórshavn

The first Faroese post office was opened in Tórshavn on 1 March 1870. The local sýslumaður at the time on the southern part of Streymoy, H.C. Müller, was in charge of the management of the post office for the first several years. On 1 March 1884, the post office on Tvøroyri was opened. The third post office on the Faroes was opened in Klaksvík on 1 May 1888. Both on Tvøroyri and in Tórshavn, the management of the post was conducted by the local sýslumaður.

In the 19th century, there were only these three post offices. After the turn of the century, the pace picked up. In 1903, seven post offices were opened. During the following twenty-five years, post offices were opened in essentially all of the settlements on the Faroes. Most of them were opened in 1918, when fifteen new post offices were added. Starting in the late 1960s and continuing up to the present, a number of post offices have been closed. Postal service for the inhabitants of these settlements is now conducted by service agents. This change is part of the efficiency policy which the Faroese post office has been pursuing for the last few years.

Until 1 April 1976, the Faroese postal system was under the direction of Post Danmark (Post and Telegraph System). At that time the Faroese postal system was organised so that it had a post office (Tórshavn Post Office) managed by a postmaster. Then came the postal clerks with the so-called postal agents as managers. The postal clerks were located in the following settlements: Klaksvík, Tvøroyri, Vágur, Vestmanna and Saltangará. All the other post offices were divided into two groups. The larger ones were called "letter collection sites", and the smaller were called "postal exchange sites".

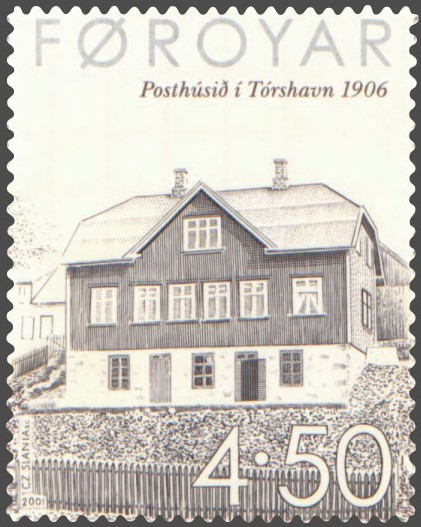
In 1906, Tórshavn Post Office got its own building.

Together with Tórshavn, these five post offices are still the main post offices.

=== Founding of Postverk Føroya ===
After the election for the Løgting in November 1974, the government decided that the postal service in the Faroes should be taken over by the Faroese Home Rule. In 1975, the Danish government and the Faroese government began negotiations on the takeover issue. The results of these negotiations led to the Faroese government taking over the postal service in the Faroes as of 1 April 1976. This new institution received the name Postverk Føroya (Post of the Faroes). A ram's horn was chosen as the institution's logo.

As a natural consequence of the takeover, two new departments were established within the Faroese postal system:

- The Postage Stamp Department.
- The Post Office Giro.

Work was being done on restructuring the Faroese postal system, with the intent being for Postverk Føroya, which was a public institution, to be reorganised into a type of joint-stock enterprise. The postal system, however, continued to be a public company.

== Philatelic history ==
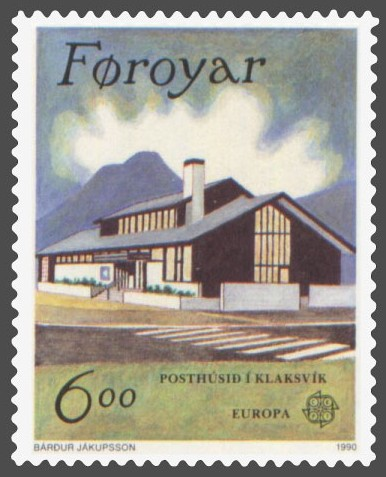
Old Post Office in Klaksvík.

Having used Danish stamps since 1870, the Faroes finally began their own issues on 30 January 1975 when the Danish postal system began issues with the caption FØROYAR. Since 1 April 1976, the Postage Stamp Department of Postverk Føroya has assumed full responsibility for all Faroese postage stamps including production and issue.

== See also ==
- List of postal codes in the Faroe Islands
- Postage stamps and postal history of the Faroe Islands
- List of people on the postage stamps of the Faroe Islands

== Bibliography ==
- Stanley Gibbons Ltd, various catalogues
- Stanley Gibbons Ltd, Europe and Colonies 1970, Stanley Gibbons Ltd, 1969
- Stuart Rossiter & John Flower, The Stamp Atlas, W H Smith, 1989
- XLCR Stamp Finder and Collector's Dictionary, Thomas Cliffe Ltd, c.1960
