= Kvívík =

Kvívík Kvivig (Danish)
- Municipality and village
- Kvívík Municipality; Kvívíkar kommuna (Faroese)
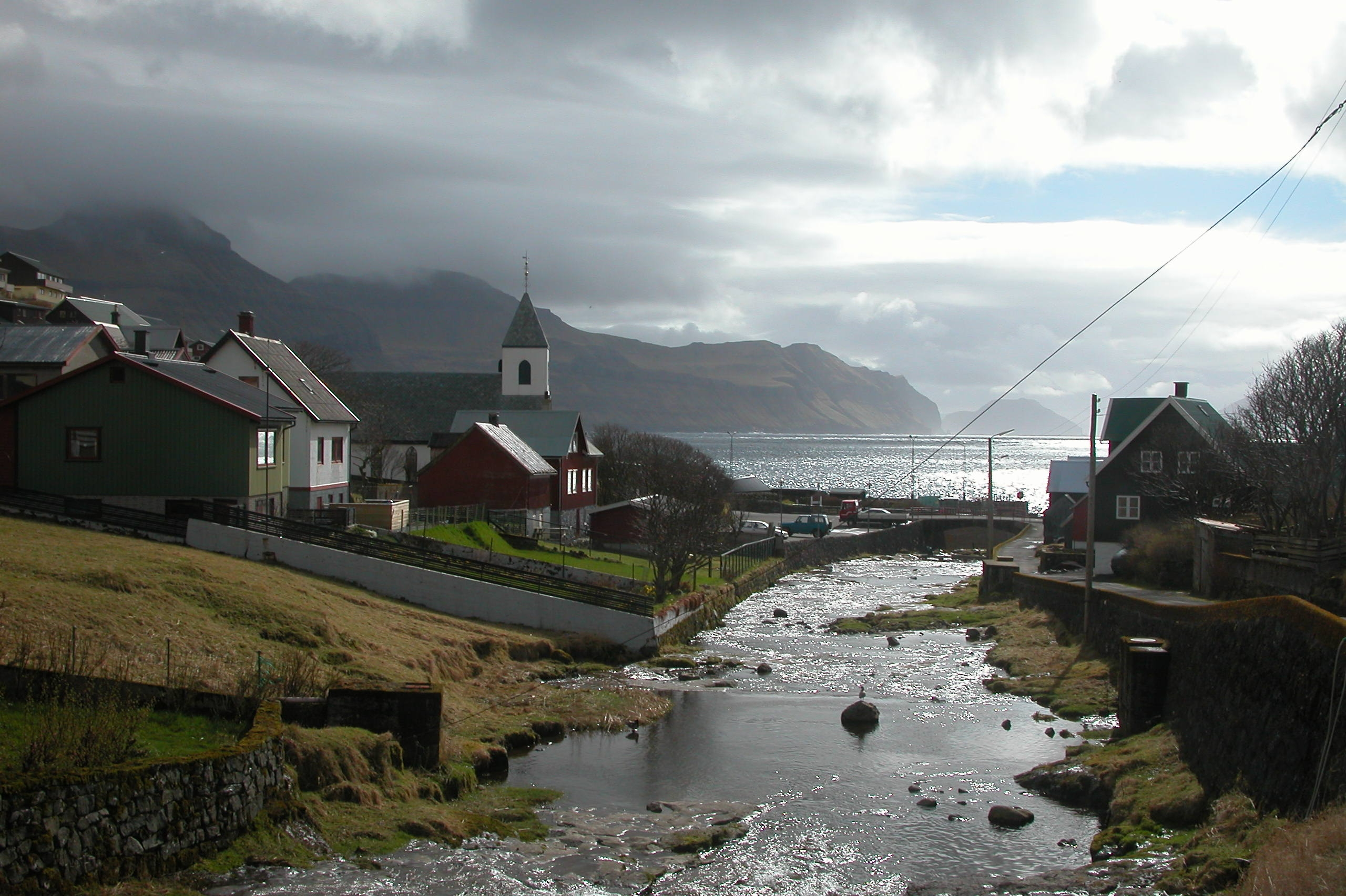
- Kvívík

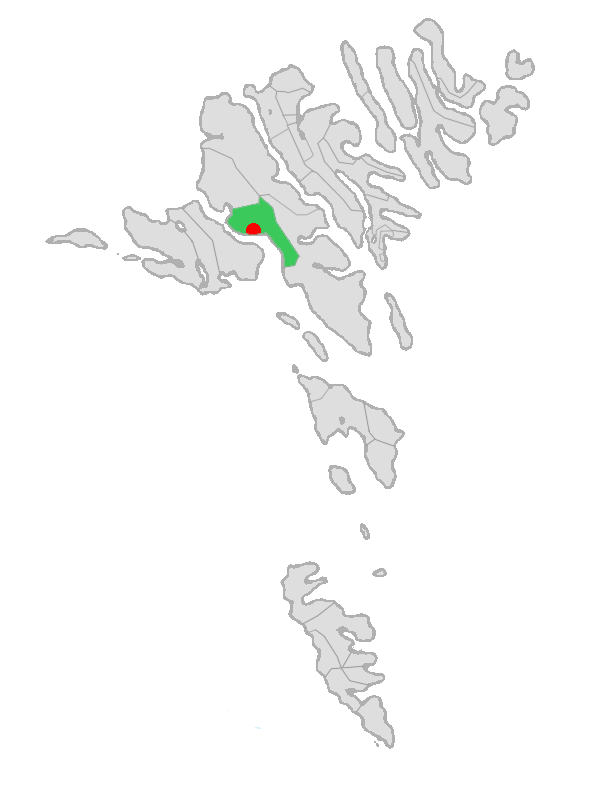
- Location of Kvívíkar kommuna in the Faroe Islands

- Location of Kvívík village in the Faroe Islands
- Coordinates: 62°7′14″N 7°4′4″W
- State: Kingdom of Denmark
- Constituent country: Faroe Islands
- Island: Streymoy

Area
  - Municipality: 12.25 km^{2} (4.73 sq mi)

Population (September 2025)
  - Municipality: 615
  - Municipality density: 50.2/km^{2} (130/sq mi)
  - Village: 393
- Time zone: GMT
  - Summer (DST): UTC+1 (WEST)
- Postal code: FO 340
- Climate: Cfc

Kvívík (Danish: Kvivig) is a village and municipality on the west coast of Streymoy in the Faroe Islands.

== History ==
Kvívík is one of the oldest settlements in the Faroes and excavations have shown the remains of Viking houses. The oldest current house in Kvívík was built in the 18th century. There have been other churches, the present one was built in 1903. The village got a school in 1907. Pupils from the villages Kvívík, Stykkið, Leynar and Skælingur go there until 7th grade. When they start in the 8th grade they will attend the school in Vestmanna. The present school was founded on 22 August 1976. In 2010 a new building was built for multipurpose kindergarten, which was named Áarlon. It has rooms for children from the ages 0 to 8. There is a rowing club in Kvívík. It is called Kvívíkar Sóknar Róðrarfelag. One of their boats which is called Junkarin won the Faroese championship for 5-mannafør women in 2011. The same boat won the championship in the boys' category in 1975, 1976 and in 1998. In 2012 the boys under 15 who are rowing with Junkarin had already won the Faroese Championship after the fifth race on Fjarðastevna in Vestmanna.

== Geography ==
The village is on both sides of a narrow bay and the small river Stora.

== Noted natives and residents ==
- Joen Danielsen (1843–1926) poet
- J. P. Gregoriussen (1845–1901) poet

== Gallery ==
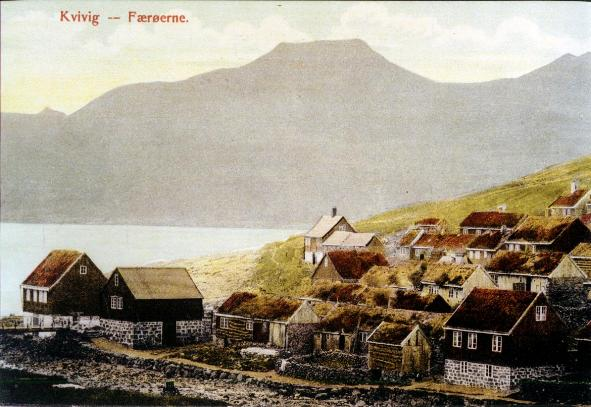
Hand-coloured postcard of 1900

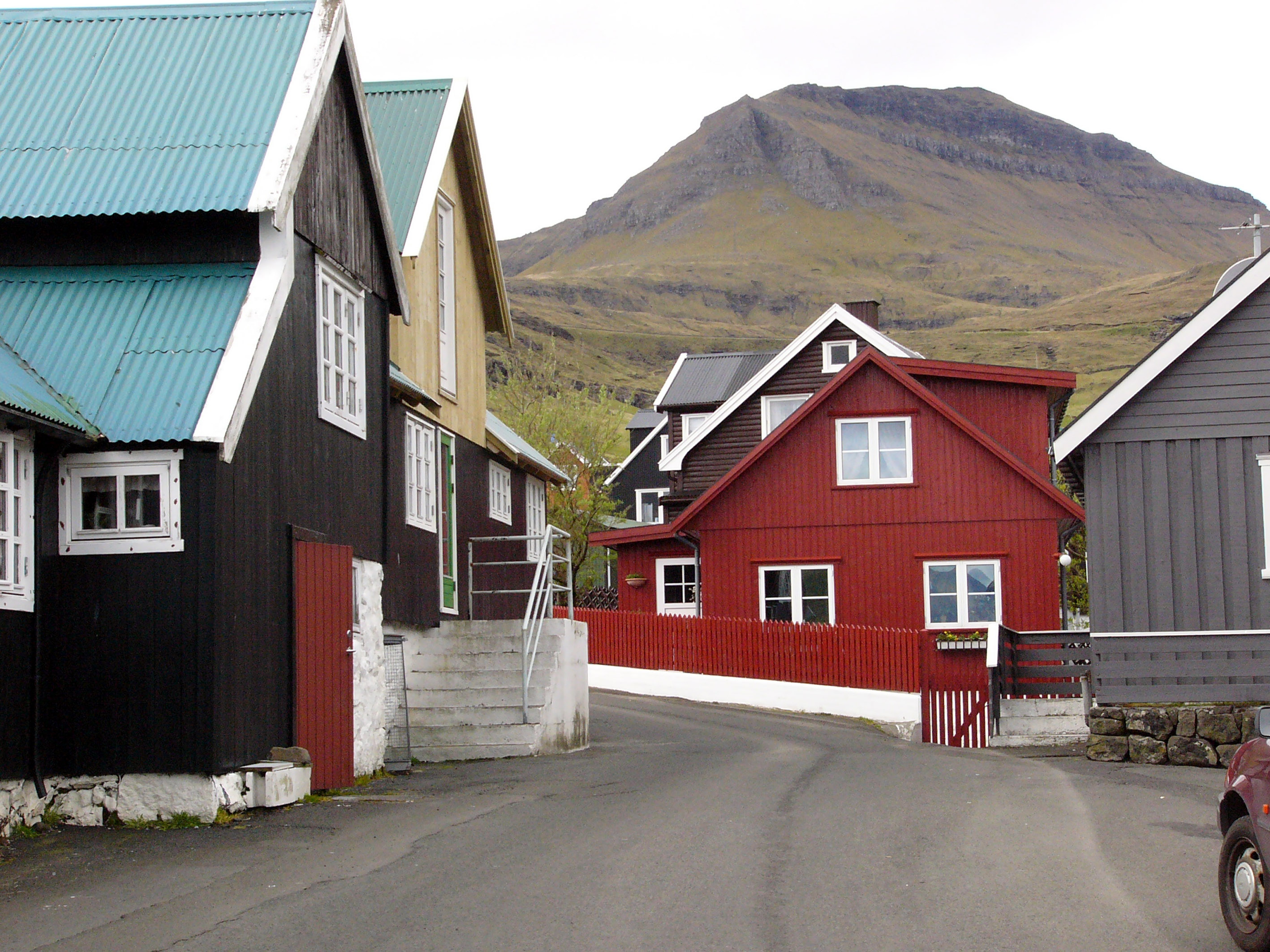
Kvívík in 2006

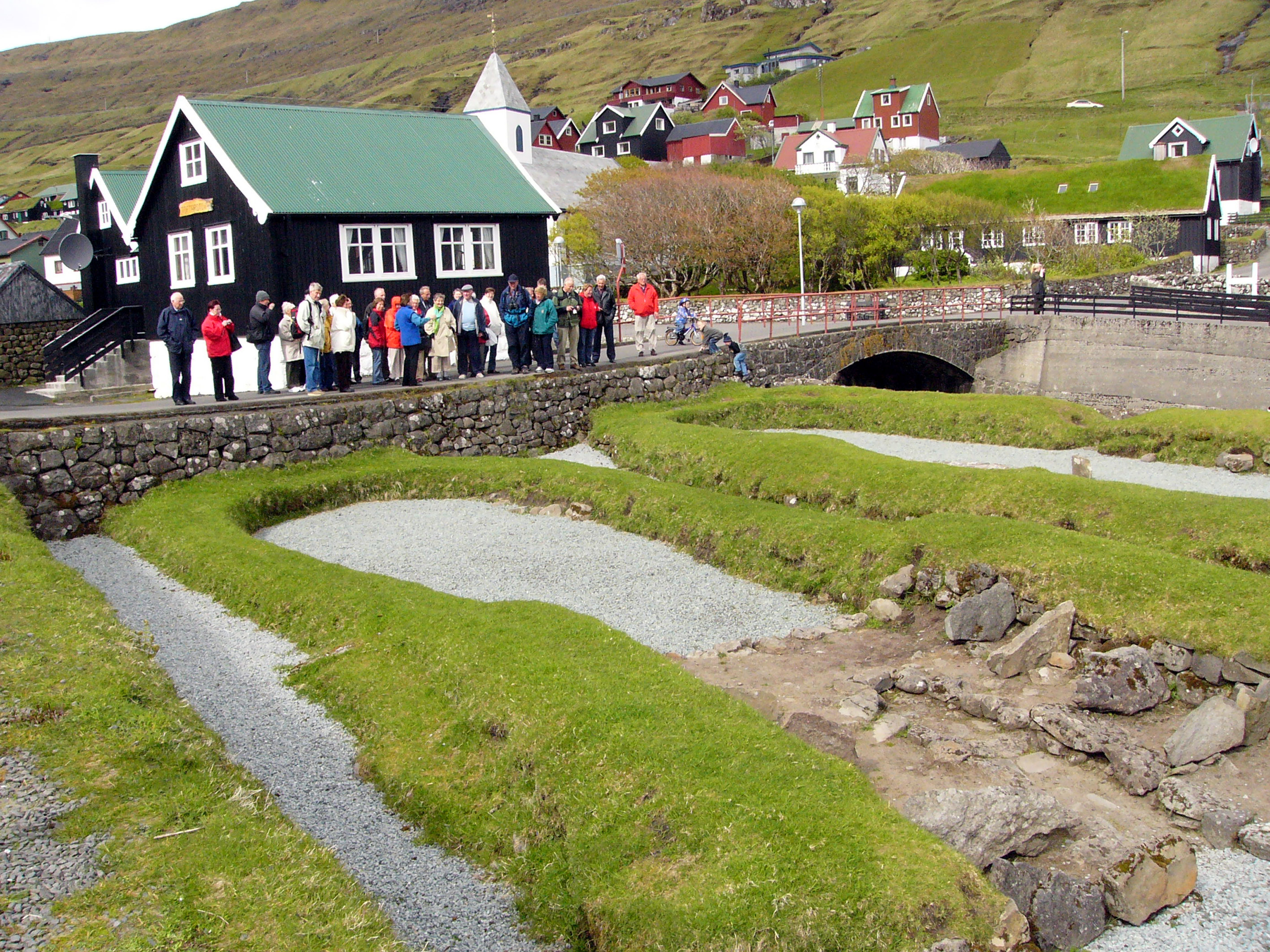
Old Settlement of Vikings

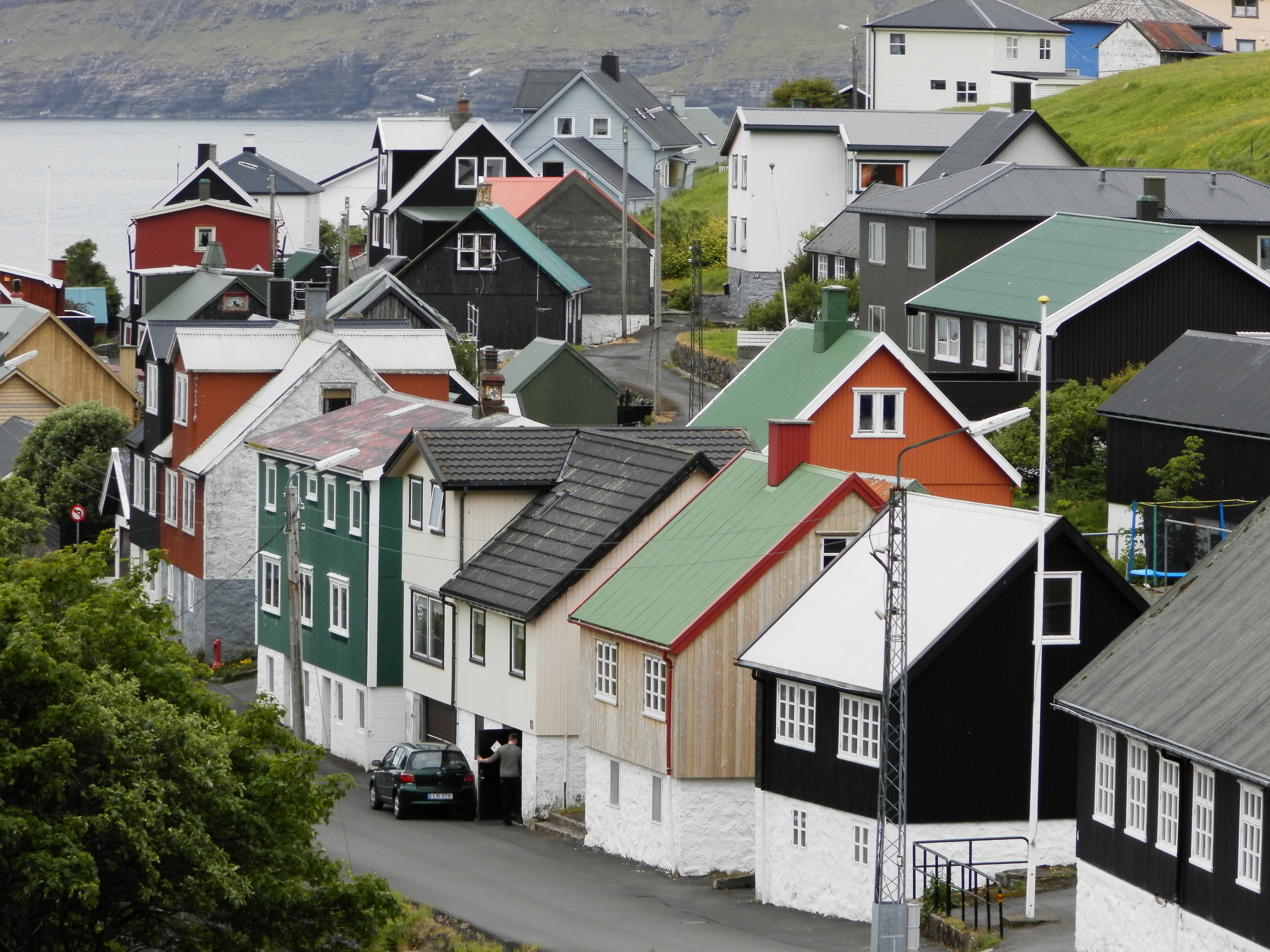
Kvívík in July 2012

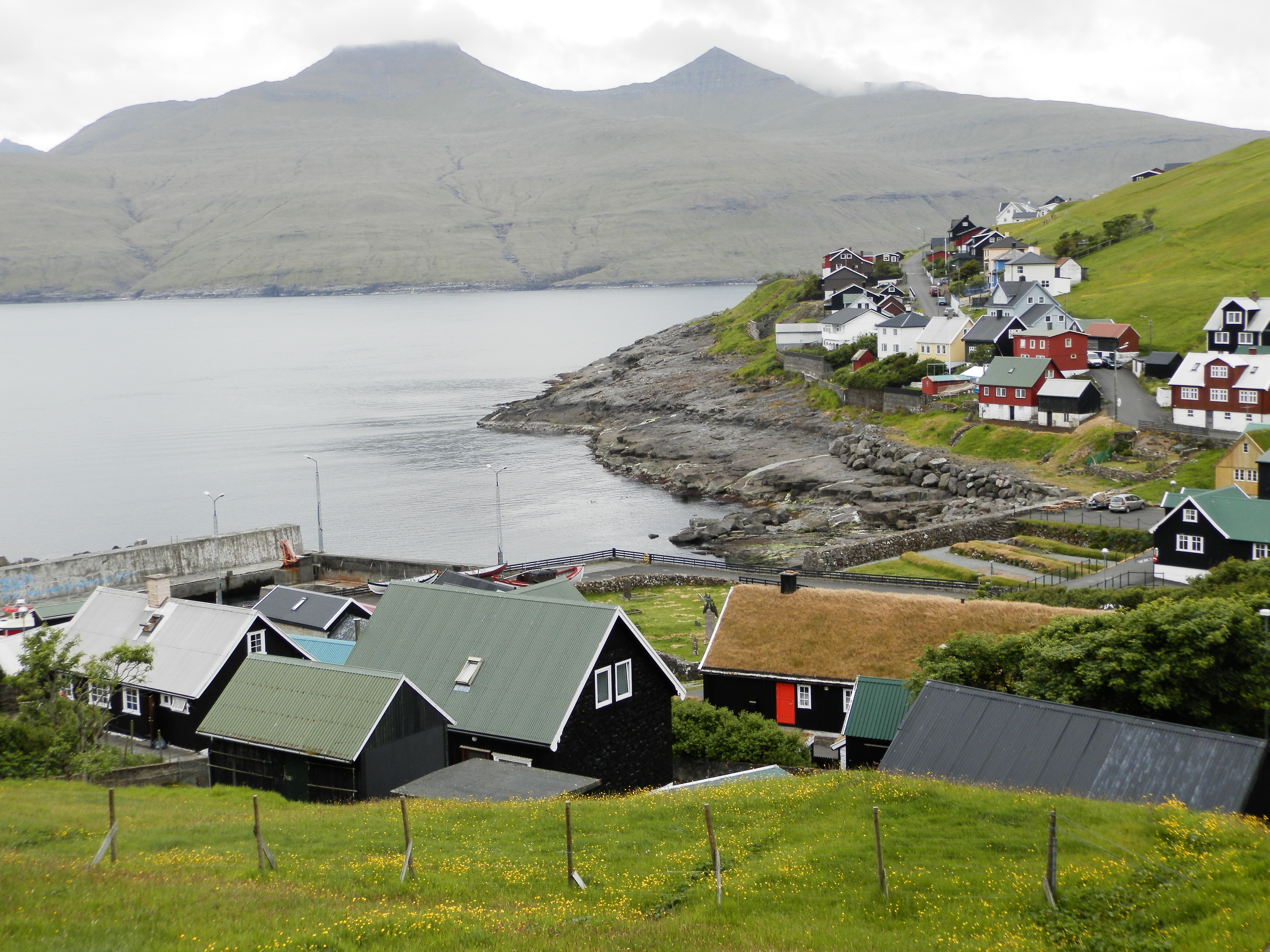
Kvívík in 2012

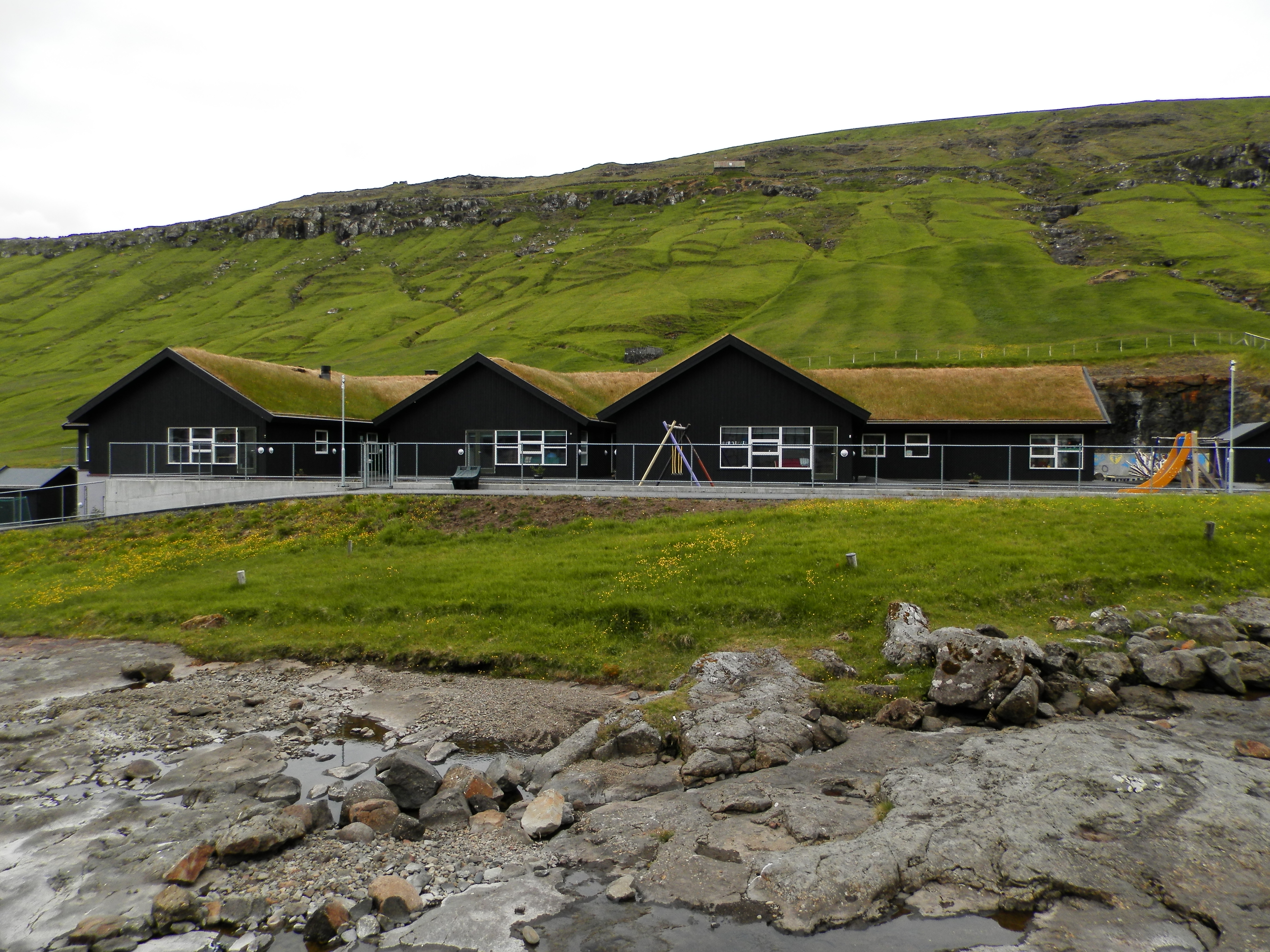
The kindergarten Áarlon

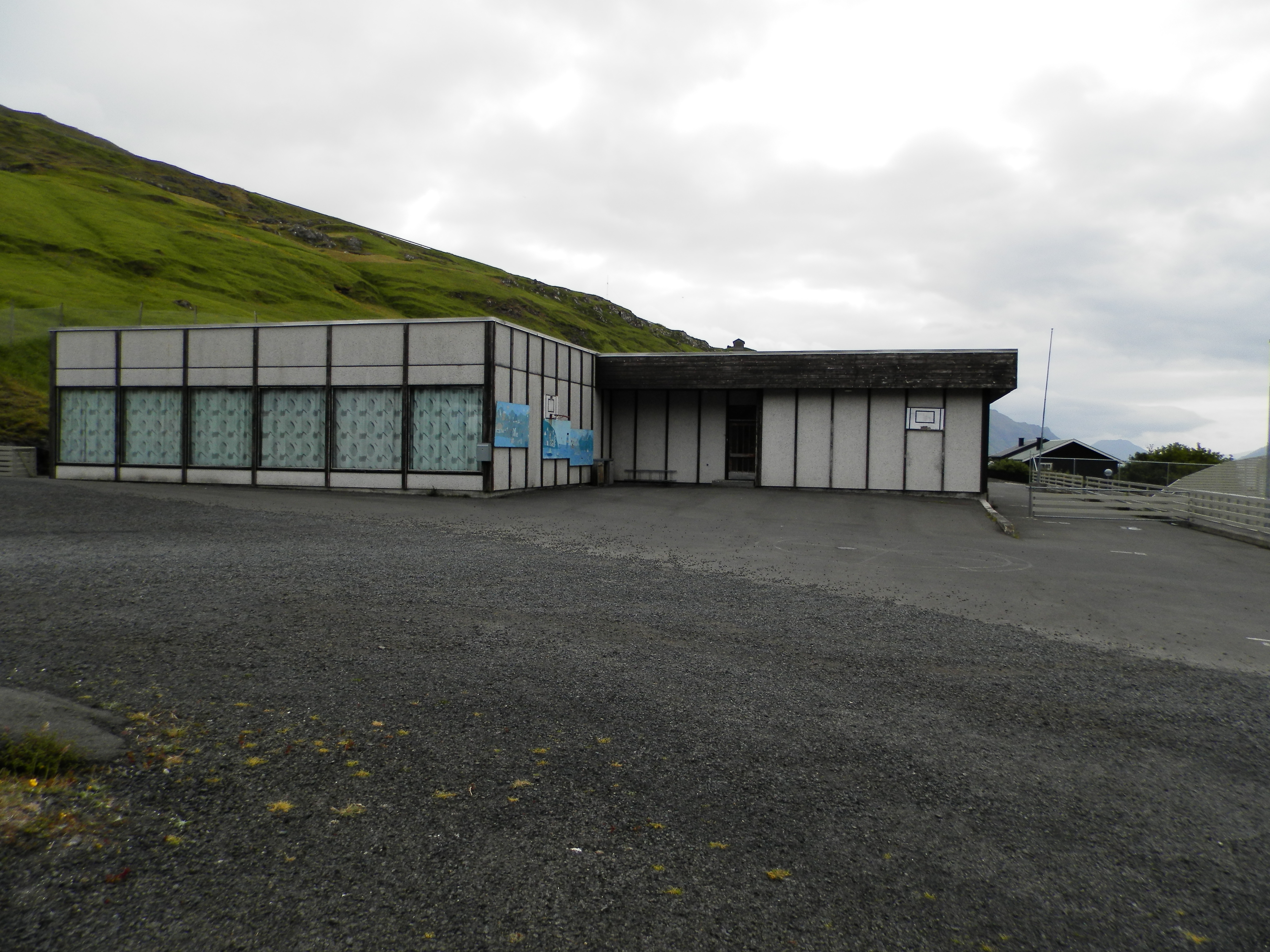
The school of Kvívík

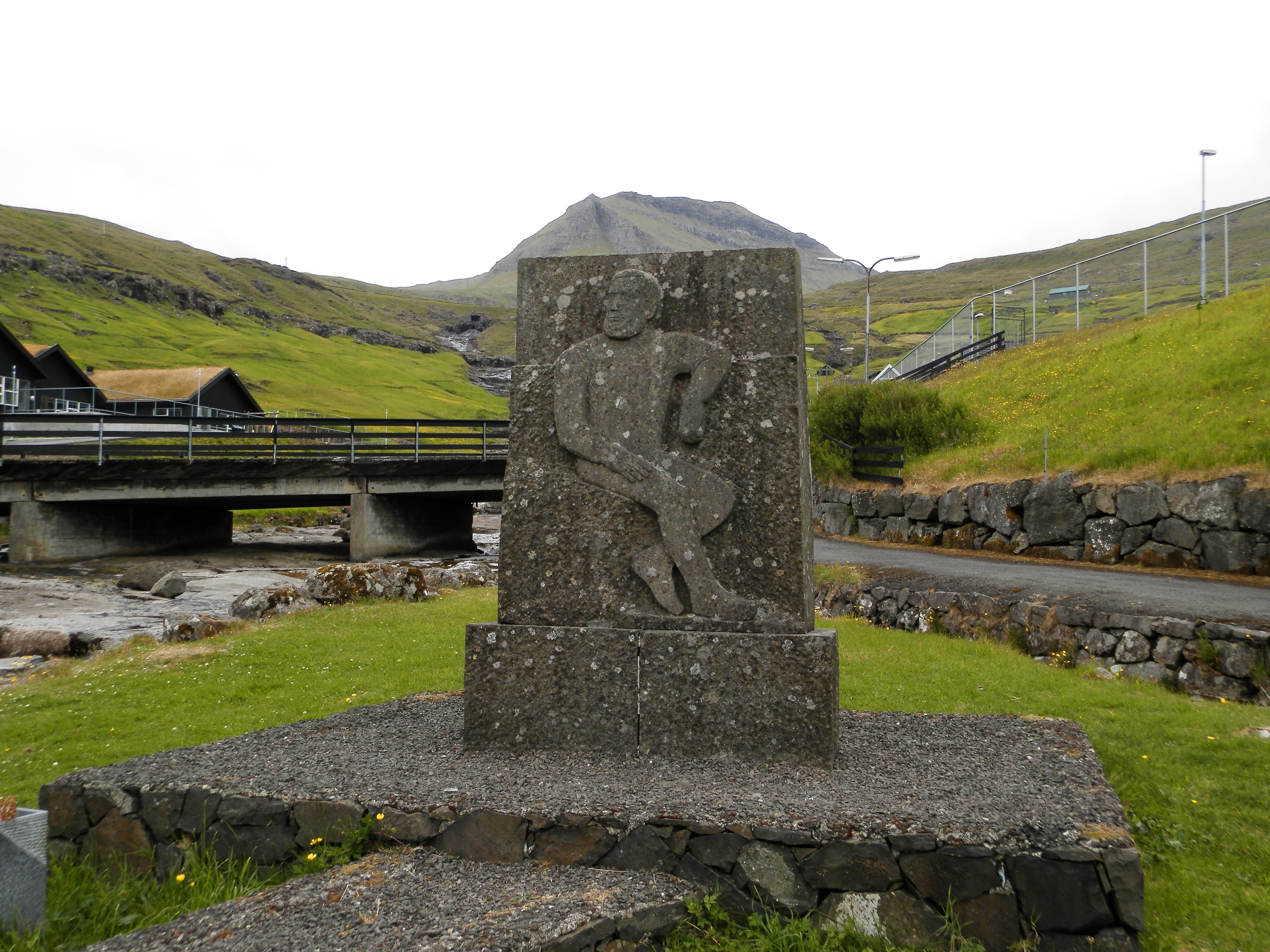
A memorial in Kvívík

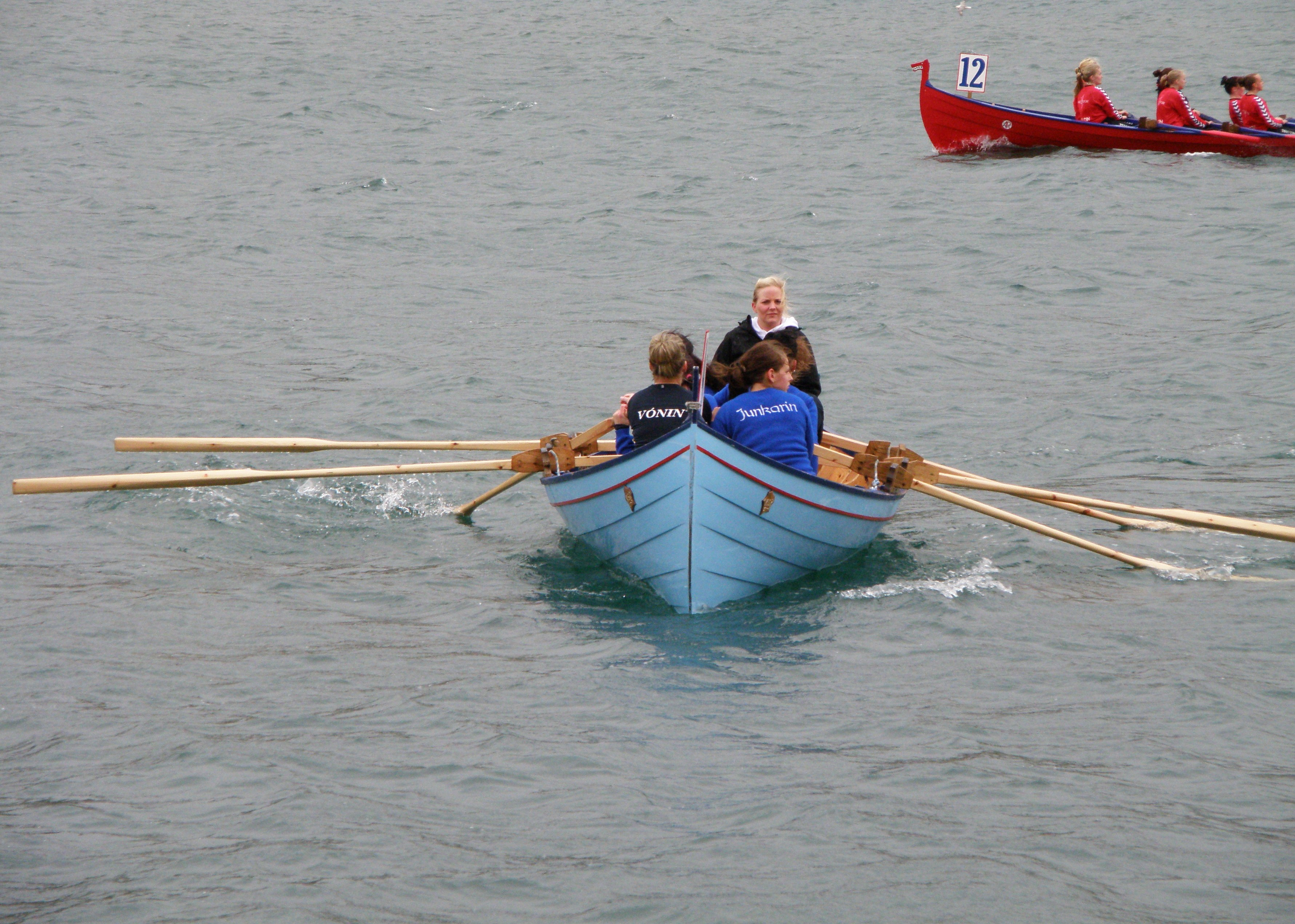
Junkarin in 2011

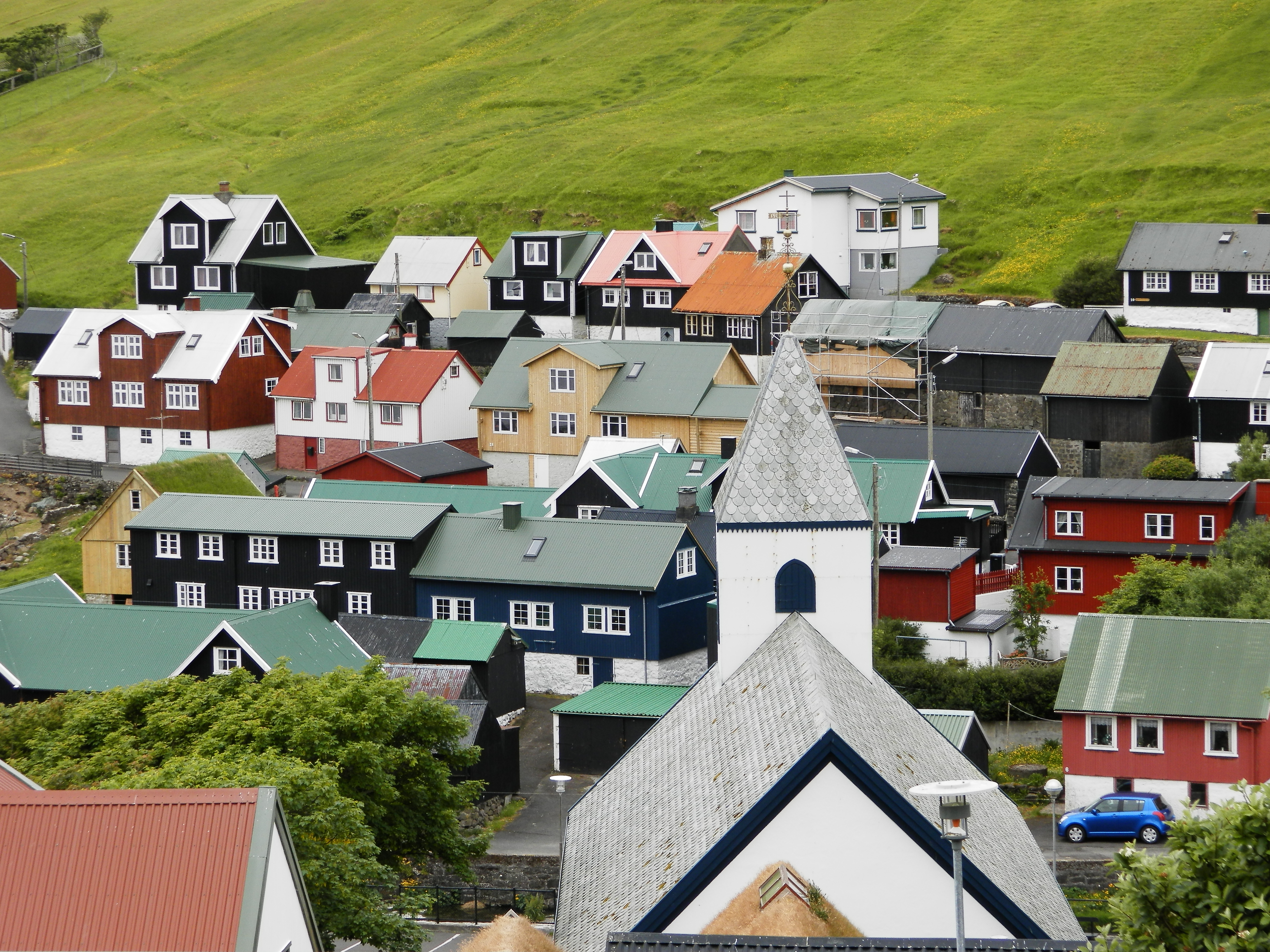
The church and the village

== See also ==
- List of towns in the Faroe Islands
- Streymoy
