= Heðin Mortensen =

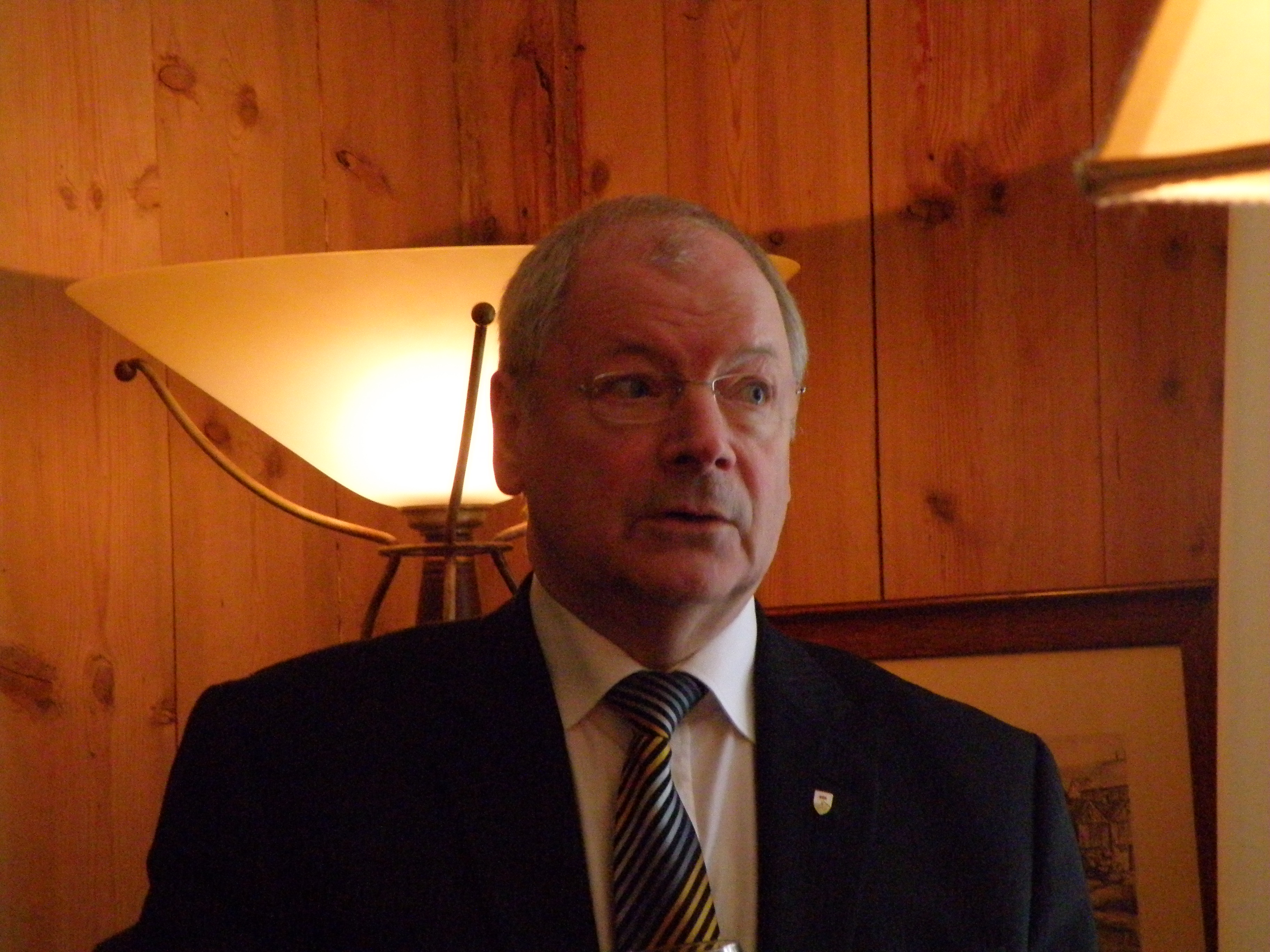

Former mayor of Tórshavn
- Incumbent
- Assumed office January 1, 2021
- Preceded by: Annika Olsen
- In office January 1, 2005 – December 31, 2016
- Preceded by: Jan Christiansen
- Succeeded by: Annika Olsen

Personal details
- Born: April 7, 1946 (age 80) Trongisvágur
- Party: Social Democratic Party
- Spouse: Hjørdis Egholm

Heðin Mortensen (born April 7, 1946) is a Faroese politician and member of the Social Democratic Party. He was the mayor of the Municipality of Tórshavn, serving from January 1, 2021, and succeeded by Elsa Berg in 2024. He was also mayor from January 1, 2005, to December 31, 2016.

Mortensen was born in Trongisvágur. He worked as a mechanic from 1961 to 1978, when he became an insurance agent for The Faroe Insurance Company (Faroese: Tryggingarfelagið Føroyar). He headed the Tórshavn Rowing Club from 1973 to 1979, the Tórshavn Athletics Association (Faroese: Tórshavnar Ítróttarráð) from 1975 to 1978, and the Faroese Athletics Association (Faroese: Ítróttasamband Føroya) from 1980 to 2000. He was also the chair of the Tórshavn Theater Society from 1996 to 2003. He has been a supervisory board member of the power company SEV since 1973 and was its director from 1993 to 1997.

In politics, Mortensen became a member of the Tórshavn municipal council in 1973. He served as deputy mayor from 2001 to 2005 before becoming mayor. He was a member of the Union Party from 1988 to 2004. As a member of the Union Party, Mortensen was also active in politics at the national level. He intermittently participated in the Faroese Parliament as a deputy representative from 1989 to 1991 and in 1993. He later served in the Faroese Parliament as a representative from the South Streymoy (Faroese: Suðurstreymoy) district from 1998 to 2004. He became a deputy representative again in 2008, but this time for the Social Democratic Party. In 2015 he was elected to the Faroese Parliament as a member of the Social Democratic Party.

Mortensen has received numerous Nordic honors for his involvement in sports. He was named a knight of the Order of the Dannebrog in 1991, and a knight 1st class of the same order in 2003.

Mortensen is a supporter of whaling in the Faroe Islands.
