= Depil =

- Village
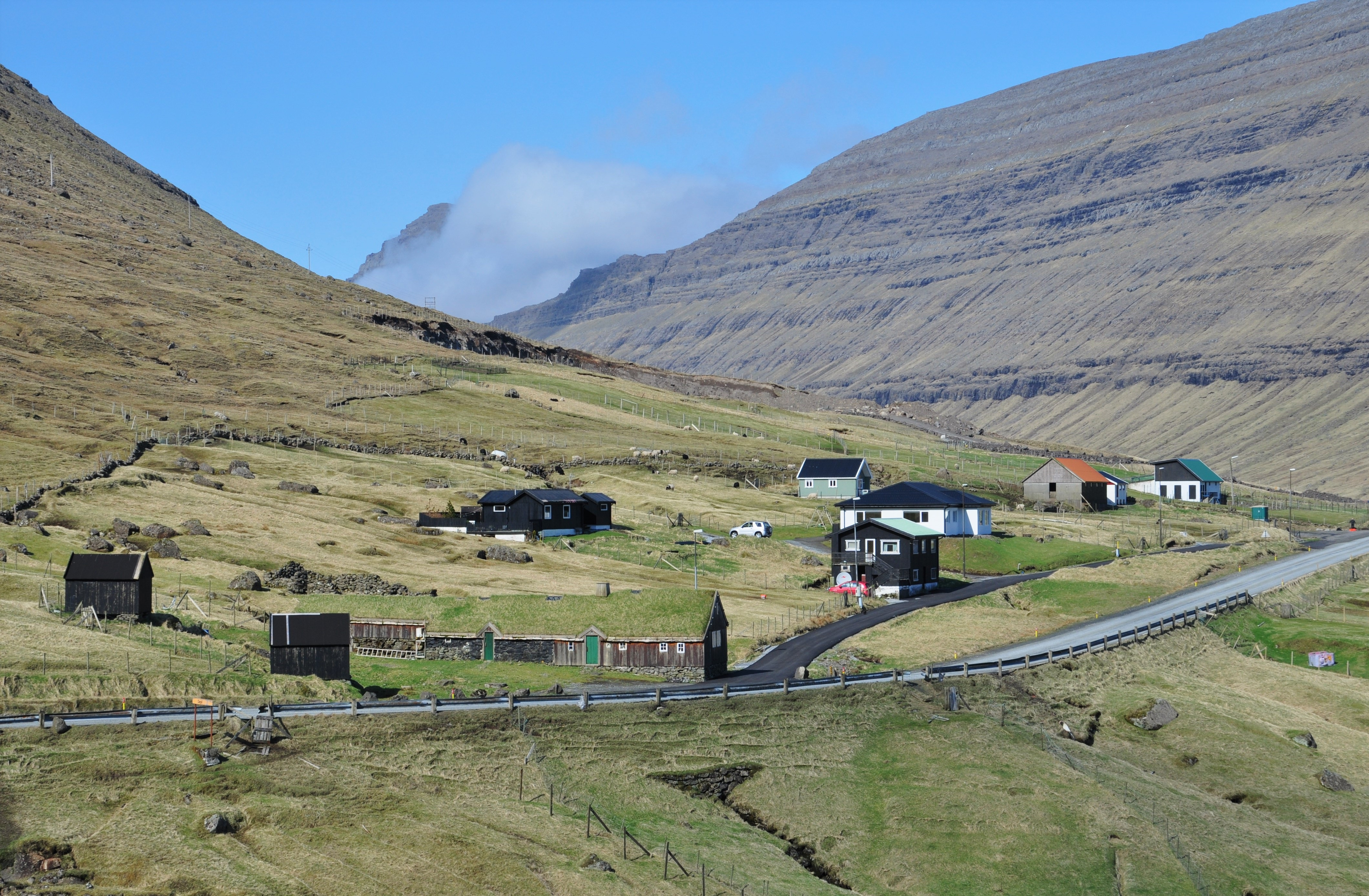
- Depil in 2022

- Location in the Faroe Islands
- Coordinates: 62°17′10″N 6°31′39″W
- State: Kingdom of Denmark
- Country: Faroe Islands
- Island: Borðoy
- Municipality: Hvannasund

Population (29 April 2025)
  - Total: 5
- Time zone: GMT
  - Summer (DST): UTC+1 (EST)
- Postal code: FO 735
- Climate: Cfc

Depil (Danish: Deble) is a village in the Faroe Islands.

Depil is located on the east side of Borðoy between Norðdepil and Norðtoftir. The village has only five inhabitants.

== The Farmstead in Depil ==
In the early 19th century the village of Depil was practically derelict. The farmers had left, ownership of the land was in the hands of outsiders, and half the cultivated soil had turned into wilderness again. In 1801, there were only three people left, and the village was probably abandoned for some years up to 1815.

In the fall of 1815, Óli Árantsson, born 1766, and his wife Anna Óladóttir moved from Norðtoftir to Depil, and life returned to the ancient village. Colloquial story tells that, in 1815, Guttorm Guttormsson built the oldest part of the farmstead in Depil. The lowest part of the house is younger, and the upper part was built by Tummas í Depli in 1823, who used driftwood as building material.

== See also ==
- List of towns in the Faroe Islands
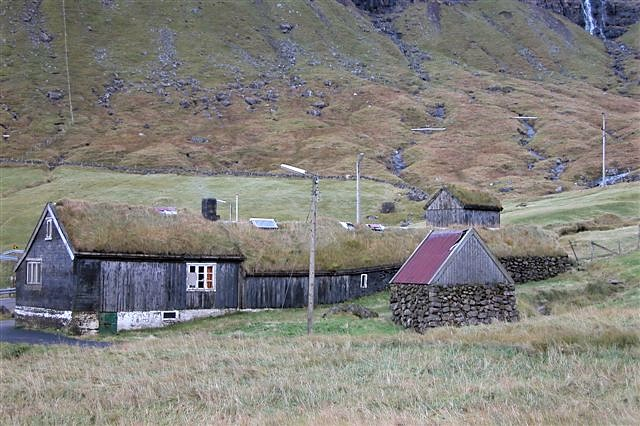
The farmstead in Depil

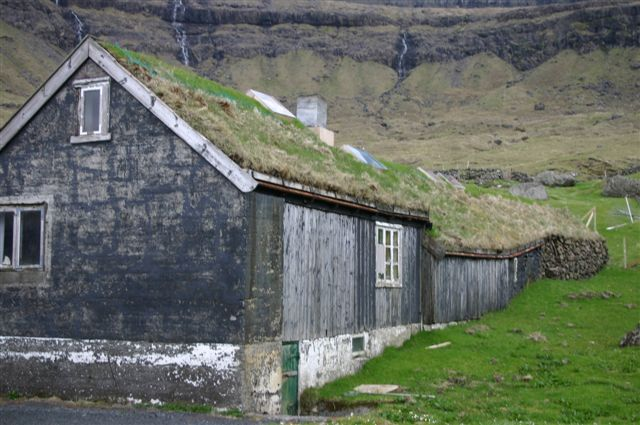
The Farmstead in Depil

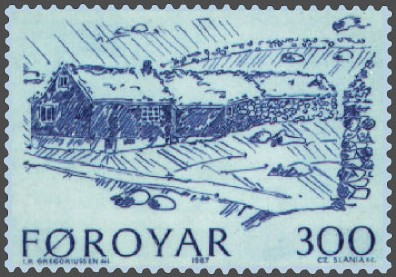
Stamp FR 139 of the Faroe Islands 1987
