= Hvannasund =

Hvannasund Kvannesund (Danish)
- Municipality and village
- Hvannasund Municipality; Hvannasunds kommuna (Faroese)
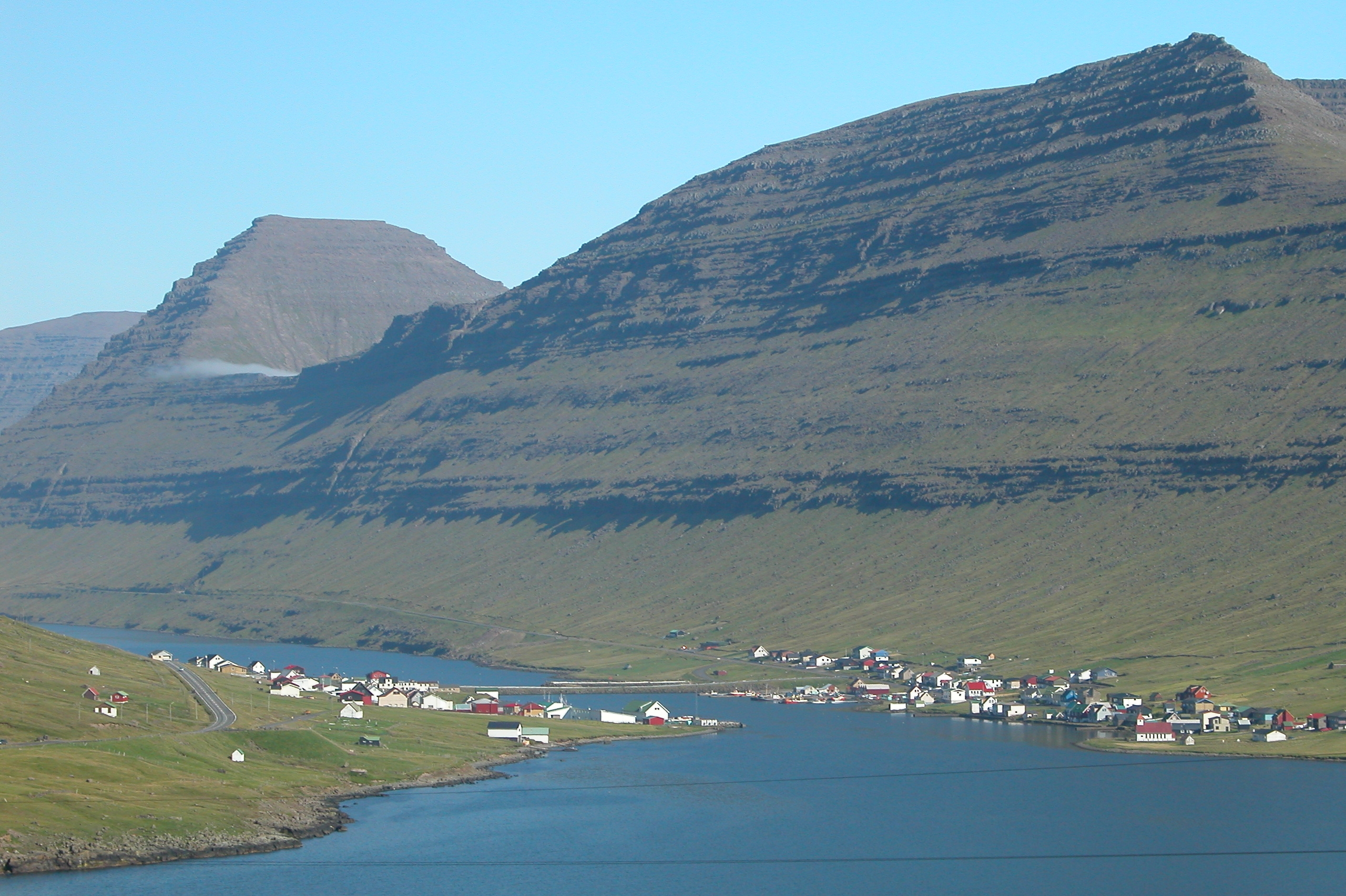
- Hvannasund to the right of the central causeway, and Norðdepil to the left

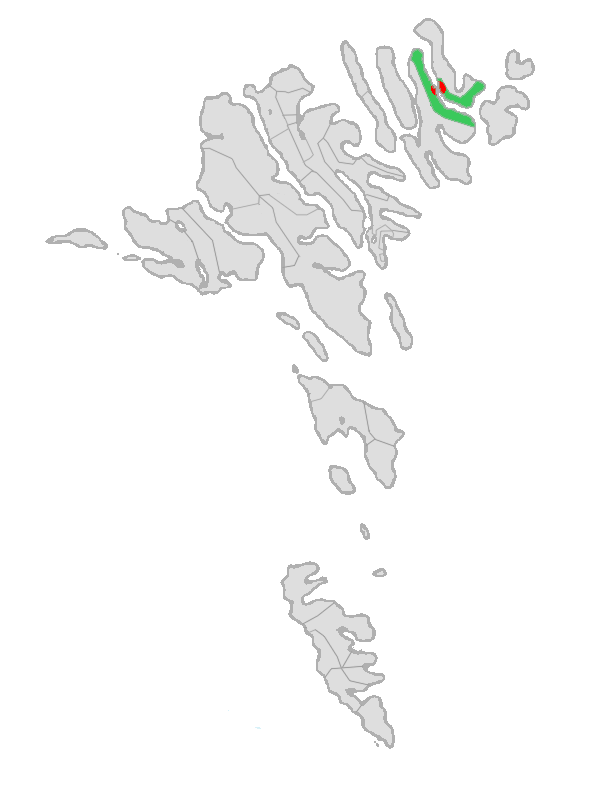
- Location of Hvannasunds kommuna in the Faroe Islands

- Location of Hvannasund village in the Faroe Islands
- Coordinates: 62°17′43″N 6°30′58″W
- State: Kingdom of Denmark
- Constituent country: Faroe Islands
- Island: Viðoy

Area
  - Municipality: 33.19 km^{2} (12.81 sq mi)

Population (September 2025)
  - Municipality: 423
  - Village: 270
- Time zone: GMT
  - Summer (DST): UTC+1 (WEST)
- Postal code: FO 740
- Climate: Cfc
- Website: http://www.hvannasund.fo/

Hvannasund (Danish: Kvannesund, older spelling: Quannesund) is a village and municipality in the Faroe Islands, an autonomous territory within the Kingdom of Denmark.

Hvannasund is located on the west coast of the island of Viðoy. It faces Norðdepil on Borðoy. The villages are connected to each other by a causeway. A large cracked rock rests in an area just north of Hvannasund. An old legend details that the rock, called Skrudhettan, broke the very moment that Jesus was born.

On 26 May 2008, the ocean inexplicably receded 2½ – 3 metres before suddenly hitting the area with great strength. A couple of days later, it was reported that a mini-tsunami had hit Hvannasund. There were no injuries or fatalities.

On 3 September 2008, a majority of the town council, notably excluding the mayor, announced that there would be a referendum on merging Hvannasund municipality with the municipality of Klaksvík. The referendum was held on 17 September. Of the 321 eligible, 278 cast their votes. The result was 68 in favor, 208 against and 2 blanks, thus the merger was rejected.

== Towns in municipality ==
- Hvannasund
- Norðdepil
- Depil
- Norðtoftir
- Fossá (abandoned)
- Múli

== Culture ==
=== Church ===
The church in Hvannasund was built in 1949 and was built by locals. Efforts to get contractors to build the church were unsuccessful, and the church ended up being built by local residents. On 13 November 1949, the church was consecrated by provost Jákup Joensen, which was his very first consecration of a church building. The church was designed by Faroese architect H.C.W. Tórgarð and has room for roughly 100 people. It is located close to the sea in very picturesque environment.

In 2016 an additional building was built next to the church to be used for events that require space for more people, such as funerals, weddings and baptisms.

== Notable residents ==
- Livar Nysted

== See also ==
- List of towns in the Faroe Islands
