= Múli =

- Village
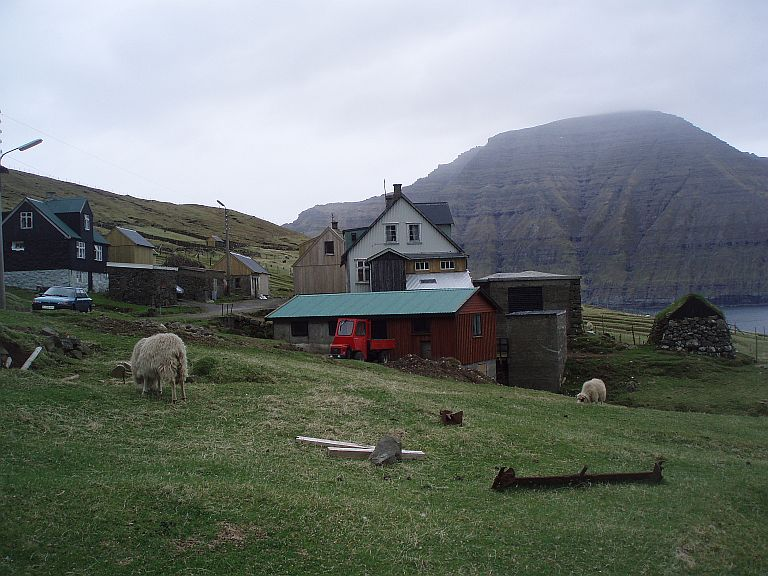

- Location in the Faroe Islands
- Coordinates: 62°21′05″N 6°34′54″W
- State: Kingdom of Denmark
- Constituent country: Faroe Islands
- Island: Borðoy
- Municipality: Hvannasund

Population (30 April 2025)
  - Total: 0 (de facto abandoned)
- Time zone: GMT
  - Summer (DST): UTC+1 (EST)
- Postal code: FO 737
- Climate: Cfc

Múli (pronounced [ˈmʉulɪ]; Danish: Mule) is a hamlet on the island of Borðoy in the Norðoyar Region of the Faroes.

Múli lies on the outermost northern edge of Borðoy's east coast. The origins of the settlement can be traced back to the 14th century. Múli became the last community in the archipelago to receive electricity in 1970. It was later connected with Norðdepil by Road 743 in an attempt to stop depopulation. Nevertheless, Múli has been considered abandoned since 2002, though there are still four registered residents. During the summer months, some of its former residents use their old houses as vacation homes.

== Nature ==
The mountains around Múli are spectacular and do not offer any easy climbing. They are also the last stronghold of a contiguous population of Arctic Willow in the Faroe Islands.

== History ==
The oldest record of Múli is to be found in the so-called ‘Hundabrævið’, the Dog letter, a letter concerning the keeping of sheep dogs in the Faroe Islands in the 14th century.

One of the most famous wizards in the Faroe Islands is said to have been Guttorm í Múla (1657-1739). A resident of Múli, he was reputedly often asked by people around the islands for help using his supernatural powers.

The Open Air Museum of the National Museum of Denmark, north of Copenhagen, holds two old houses from Múli, which were taken apart in the Faroes and then rebuilt on site at the museum. The old hav lifting stone of Múli is also at the same museum.

== Gallery ==
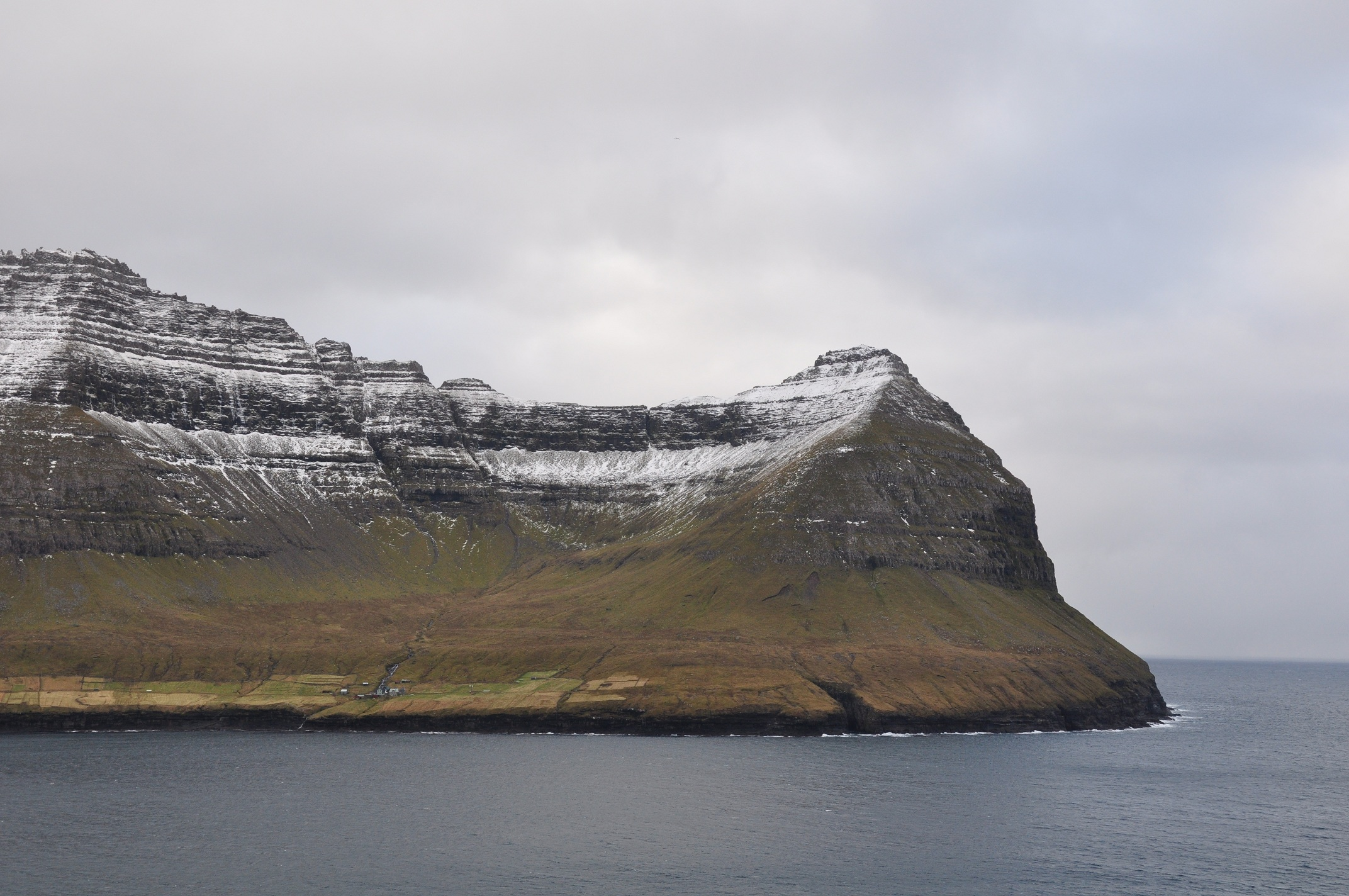
Múli means 'muzzle' or 'snout' and has its name after the headland at the end of the mountain range

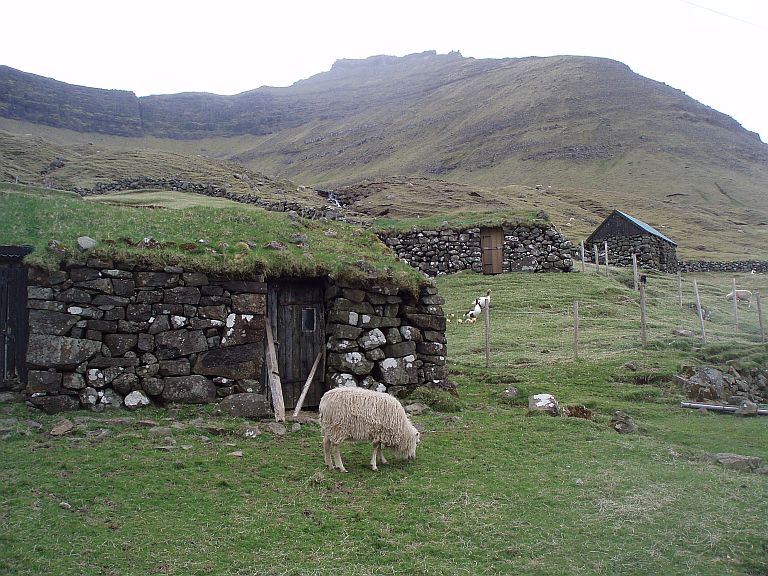
Múli, domestic animals, storehouses and hay barns, still in use

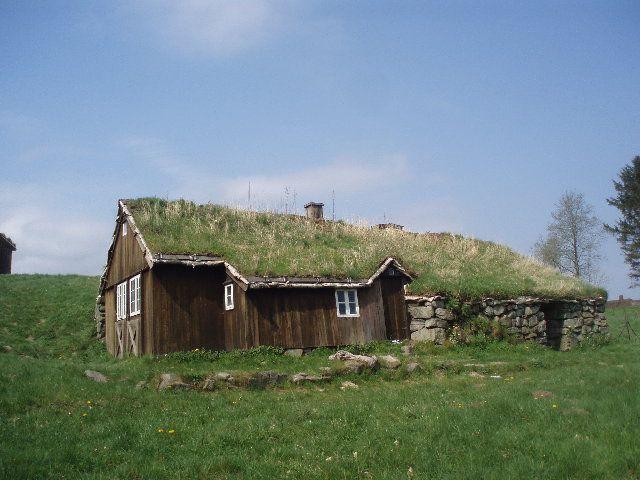
Old Faroese House from Múli on the Danish 'Frilands' Museum in Copenhagen 2008

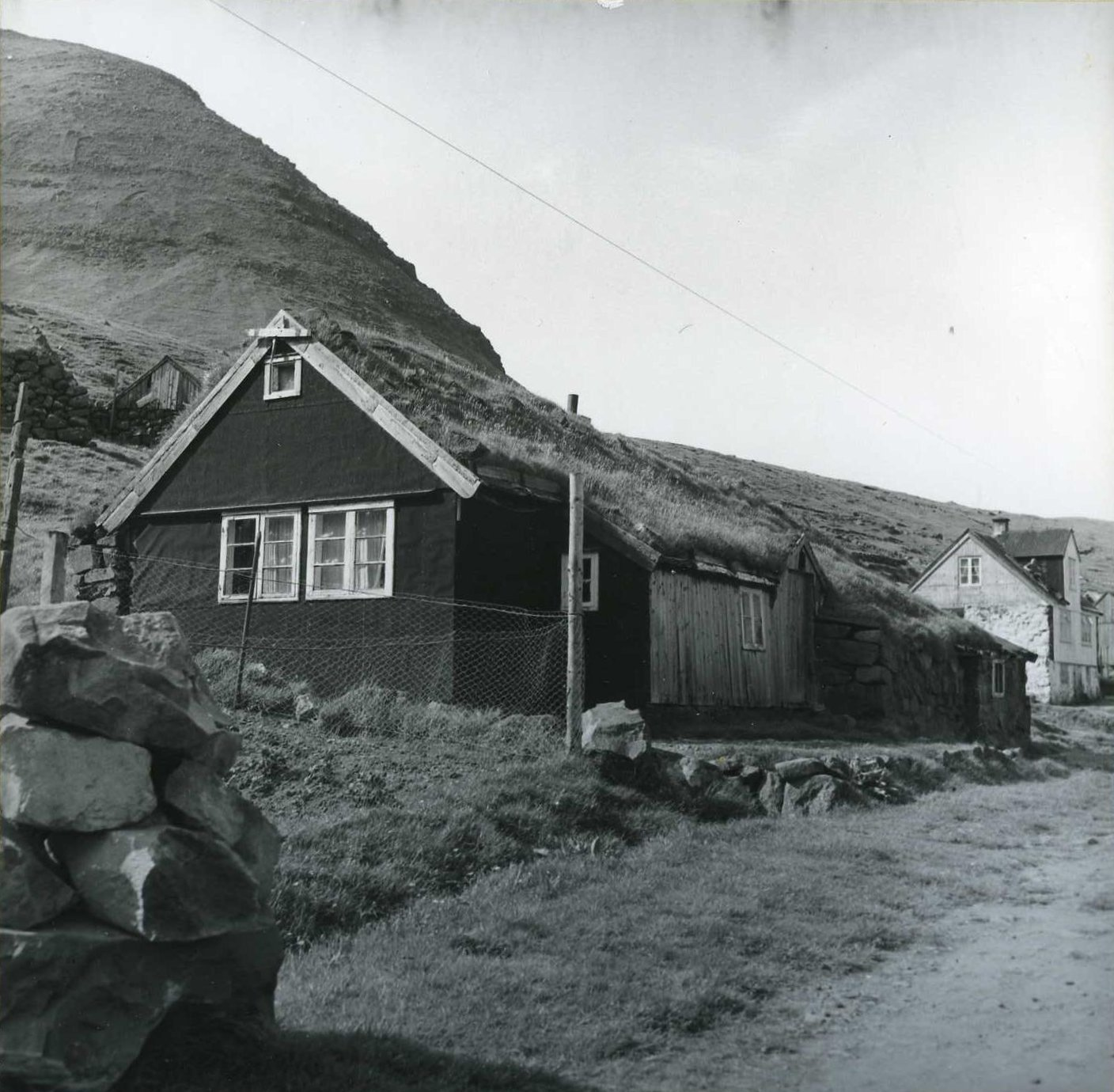
The old Faroese House "Har Frammi" still in Múli around 1960

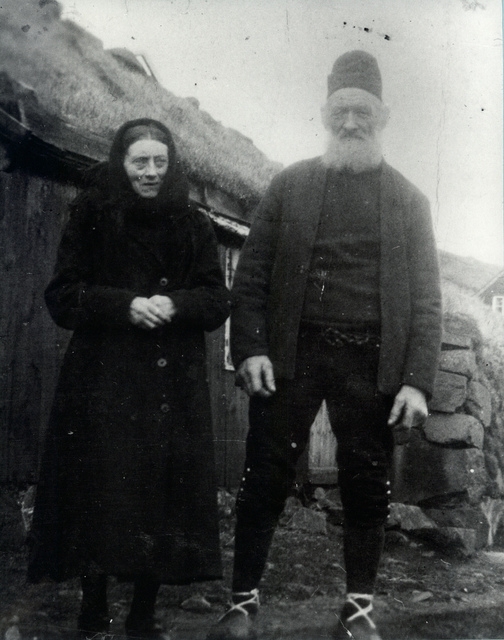
The last residents of the old Faroese House in Múli around 1940

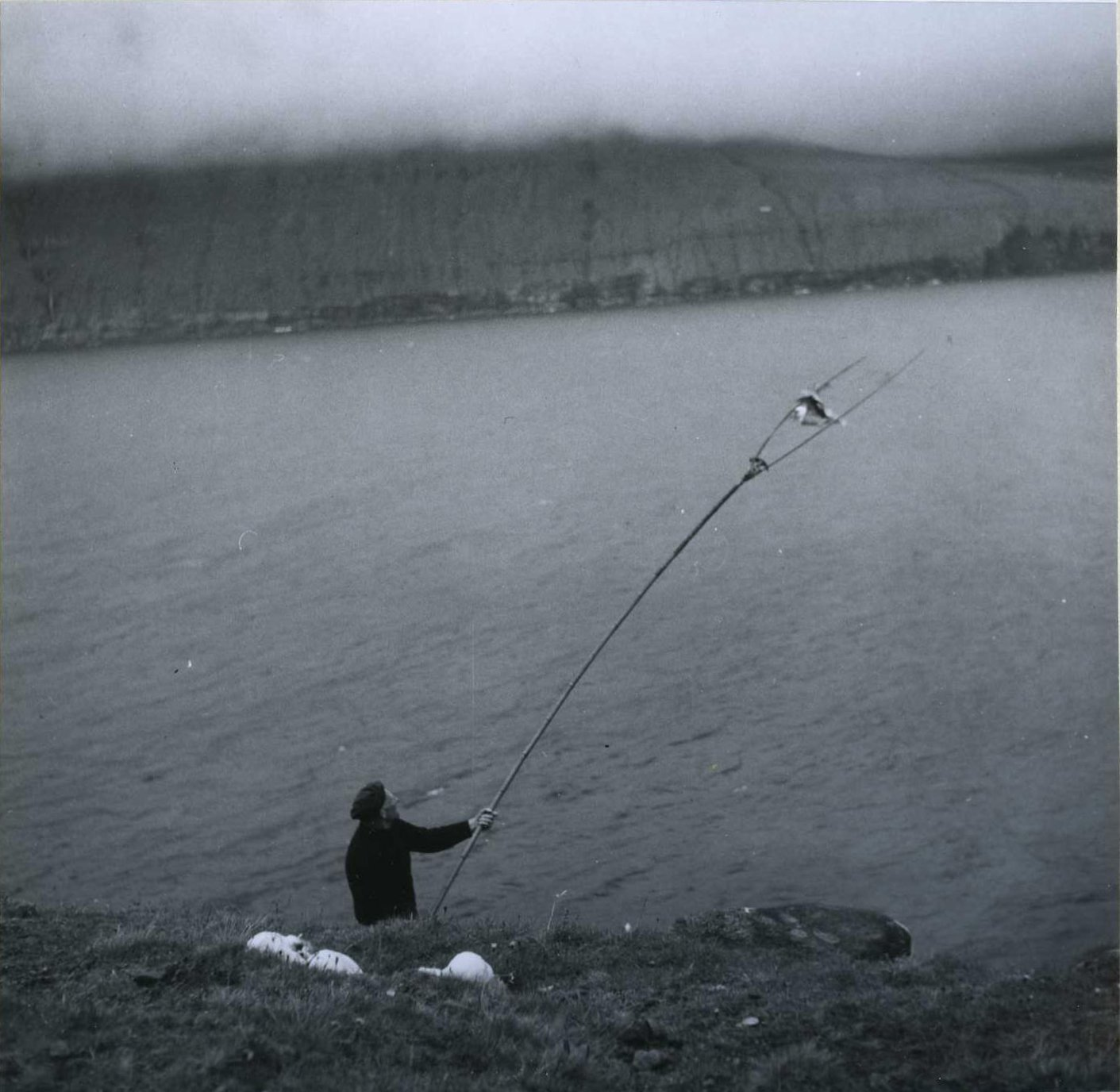
Fowling north of Múli around 1960

== See also ==
- List of towns in the Faroe Islands
