= Fossá, Faroe Islands =

Fossá
- Village
- Location in the Faroe Islands
- Coordinates: 62°18′08.10″N 6°31′53.56″W
- State: Kingdom of Denmark
- Country: Faroe Islands
- Island: Borðoy
- Municipality: Hvannasund

Population (1 January 2006)
  - Total: 0
- Time zone: GMT
  - Summer (DST): UTC+1 (EST)

Fossá is an abandoned village in the Faroe Islands. It lies on the island of Borðoy, slightly north of Norðdepil. It is at a place where several waterfalls join the sea, hence its name (cf. Faroese fossur 'waterfall' + á 'river'). Fossá was established in the 1860s as a settlement village, but nobody has lived there in recent years.
