= Tórshavn Theater Society =

Faroese theater association

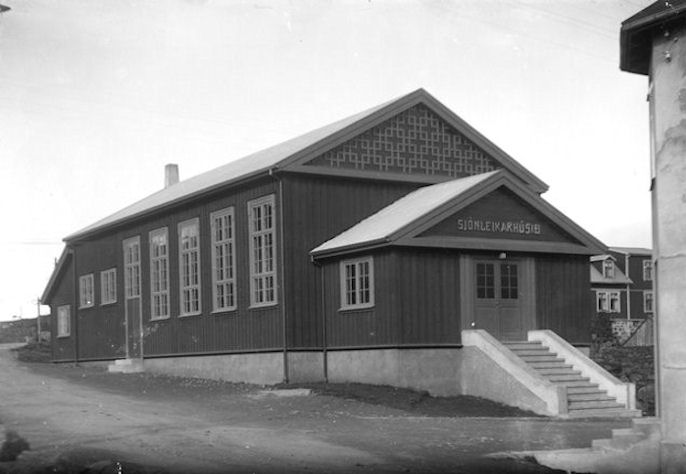
Theater building in Tórshavn in 1926

The Tórshavn Theater Society (Faroese: Havnar Sjónleikarfelag) is a theater association in Tórshavn in the Faroe Islands. The society operates the Tórshavn Theater (Faroese: Sjónleikarhúsið, 62.0128°N 6.7761°W), which was designed and built by H. C. W. Tórgarð in 1926. Tórgarð also became the society's first chairman in 1918. The Tórshavn Theater is also rented out for events.

== Chairpersons ==
- H. C .W. Tórgarð 1918–1924
- H. M. Jacobsen 1924–1928
- Rikard Long 1928–1930
- Hans A. Djurhuus 1930–1951
- J. C. Olsen 1951–1963
- Poul Johs. Lindberg 1963–1967
- Knút Wang 1967–1974
- Oskar Hermansson 1974–1980
- Olivur Næss 1980–1988
- Gulla Øregaard 1988–1989
- Oddvá Nattestad 1989–1991
- Kári Petersen 1991–1993
- Bjørgfinnur Nielsen 1993–1993
- Margreta Næss 1993–1996
- Heðin Mortensen 1996–2000
- Jytte Joensen 2003–2010
- Karin Djurhuus 2010–
