= Norðtoftir =

- Village
- Location in the Faroe Islands
- Coordinates: 62°16′38″N 6°30′49″W
- State: Kingdom of Denmark
- Constituent country: Faroe Islands
- Island: Borðoy
- Municipality: Hvannasund

Population (1 November 2020)
  - Total: 3
- Time zone: GMT
  - Summer (DST): UTC+1 (EST)
- Postal code: FO 736
- Climate: Cfc

Norðtoftir (Danish: Nordtofte) is a small settlement on the Faroese island of Borðoy in the Hvannasund municipality. The 2023 population was 3. Its postal code is FO 736.

Norðtoftir is situated on the east coast of Borðoy at the end of the second tunnel on the road from Klaksvik. Larger settlements in the surroundings are Norðdepil and Hvannasund which can be reached continuing along the road. The Danish writer Herman Bang liked to spend time in Norðtoftir. He wrote many of his works here.

== See also ==
- List of towns in the Faroe Islands
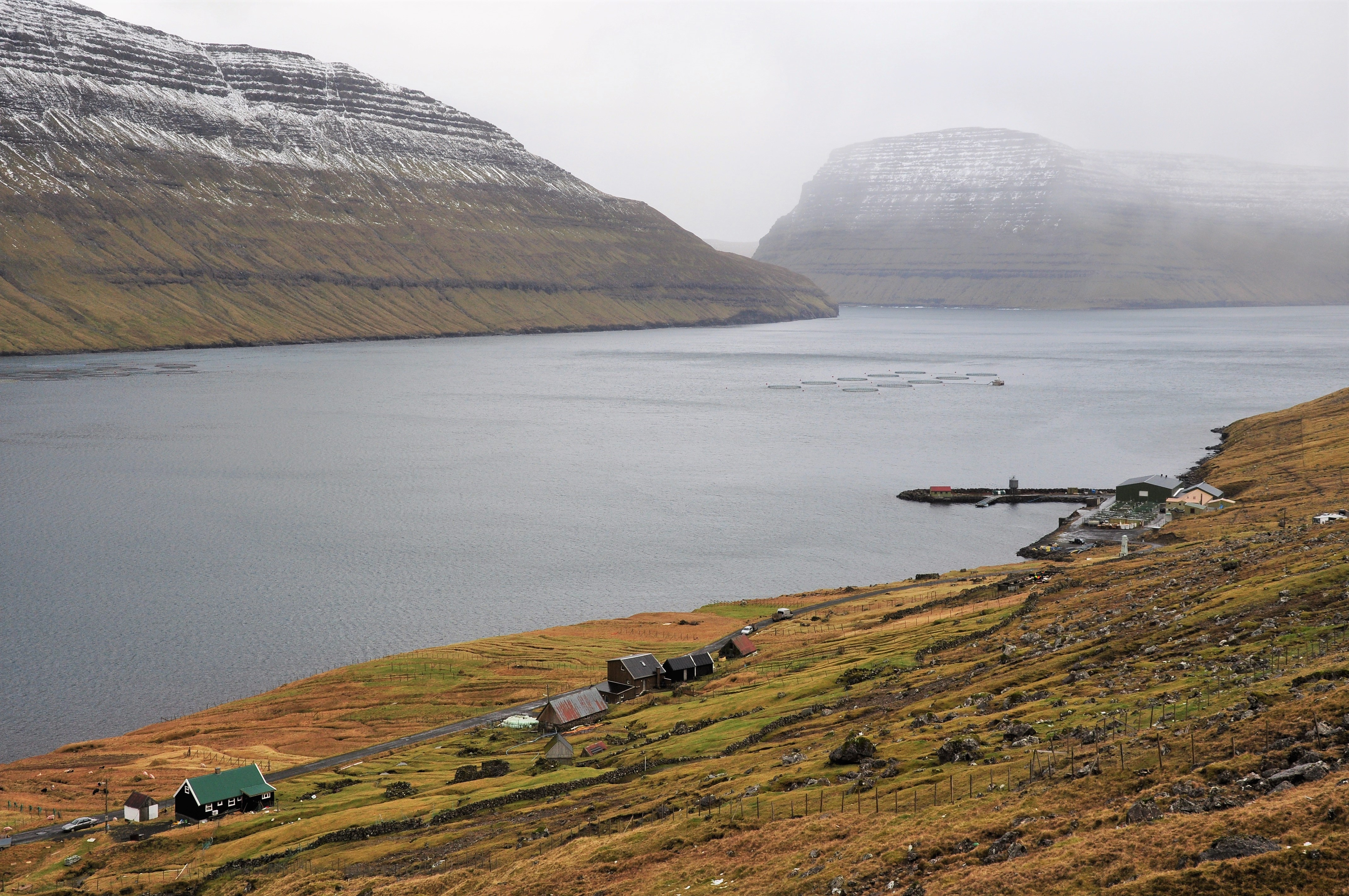
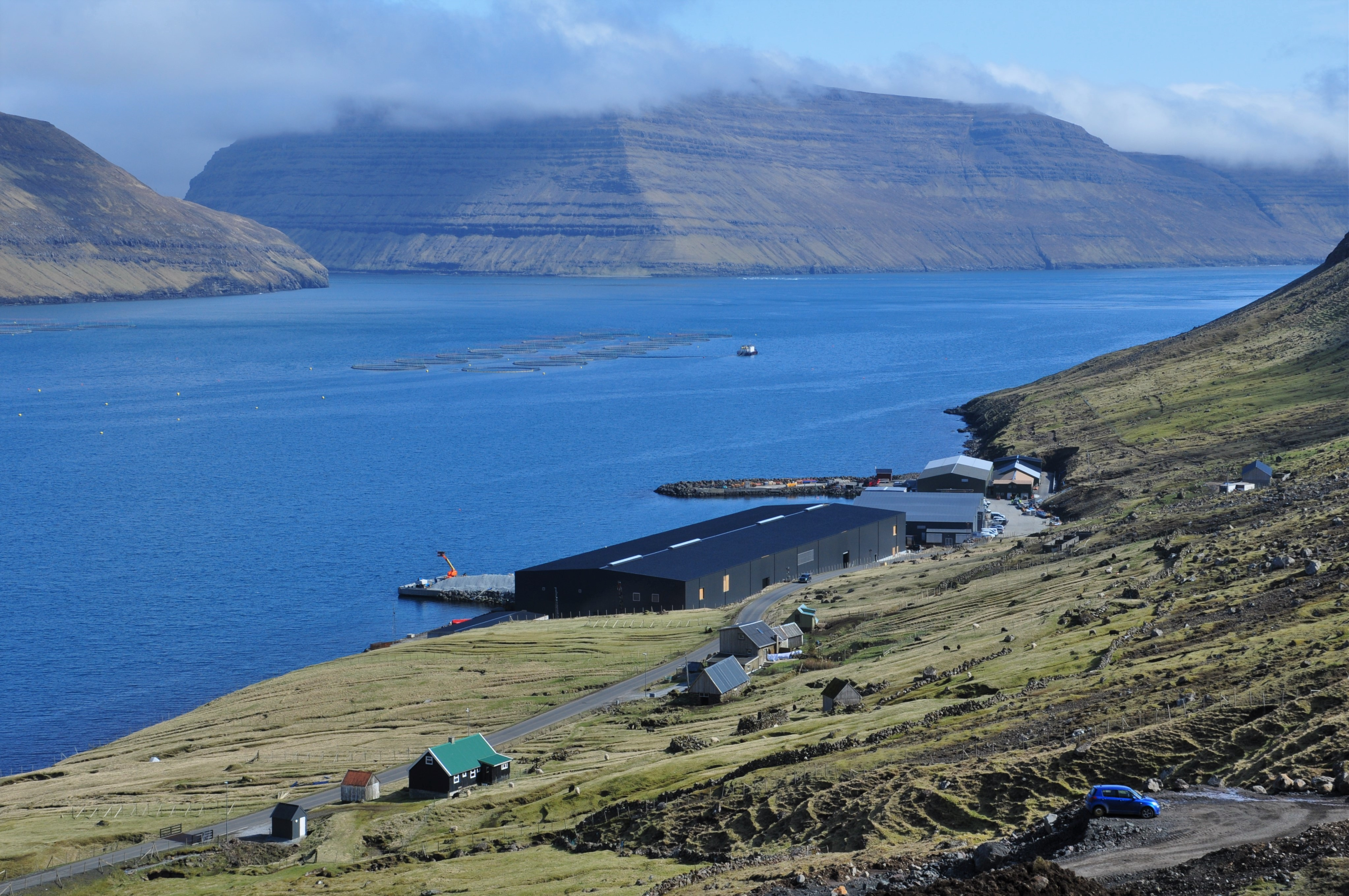
Norðtoftir in 2010 and 2022. On the other side of the Hvannasund are the islands Viðoy and Svínoy. One notes the growth of the fish industry with the large Bakkafrost salmon hatchery, built in 2020.
