= H. C .W. Tórgarð =

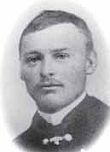
H. C. W. Tórgarð

Hans Christoffer Wenningsted Tórgarð (sometimes Hans Christoffur, August 14, 1885 – March 18, 1957) was a Faroese architect, mayor, and politician for the Union Party (Faroe Islands).

Tórgarð was born in Tórshavn, the son of Anna Paulina (née Poulsen) and Jens Wenningsted Jacobsen, both from Tórshavn. He married Valborg Eide from Nólsoy, and their son, Axel Tórgarð, is known as a priest and the translator of J. R. R. Tolkien's books into Faroese.

The theater in Tórshavn, completed in 1926, was designed by Tórgarð. He also designed churches in Árnafjørður, Hvannasund, Skáli, Elduvík, Tjørnuvík, and Skúvoy. Tórgarð was also involved in building the church in Sandavágur.

Tórgarð was the director of the Tórshavn Theater Society from 1918 to 1924. He was a member of the Tórshavn municipal government from 1917 to 1924 as a member of the Union Party, and then again in 1945 under his own party, serving until his death. He served as mayor of the town from 1923 to 1924, and he was elected to the Faroese Parliament as a representative from the South Streymoy (Faroese: Suðurstreymoy) district from 1918 to 1924. After Tórgarð's death, Mayor Petur í Gong took his place on the municipal council and continued Tórgarð's party under his own name.
