= Knút Wang =

Faroese journalist and politician

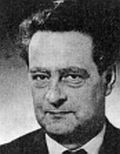
Knút Wang

Knút Wang (September 10, 1917 – January 22, 1976) was a Faroese journalist and politician for the People's Party.

Wang was born in Kaldbak. As a young man he went to sea, and he later moved to Tórshavn to work in merchandising. In 1941 he became a journalist, and one year later, at the age of 25, he took over as editor of the conservative newspaper Dagblaðið. Wang served as the paper's editor from 1942 to 1946, and again from 1947 to 1975. During the second period, he was the paper's co-editor together with Maurentius Viðstein and Poul Petersen. Wang was also a member of the broadcasting council for Faroese Radio (Faroese: Útvarp Føroya) for a number of years starting in 1956, and he was the director of the Tórshavn Theater Society from 1967 to 1974. In 1940 he published a collection of short stories called Smá skálkabros (A Sly Little Smile). Wang was elected to the Faroese Parliament as a representative from the South Streymoy (Faroese: Suðurstreymoy) district from 1958 to 1974 as a member of the People's Party. Wang died in 1976.
