= Dog letter =

Faroese document

The Dog letter (Faroese: hundabrævið) is a Faroese document concerning keeping dogs on the isles. It was written between AD 1350–1400. The document mentions several Faroese villages and islands, including Lamba. It is the oldest existing reference to the local assembly. The text is contained in the Kongabókin, a collection of legal documents.

== The text ==
Ollum monnum j Færꝍygium þæim sæm tetta bref sea ædur hꝍyra sendir Simun loghmadur | ok allir loghrettu mæn j Færꝍygium qvediu guds ok sina. Sua list os vm hvnda þa sæm . . . . . . . . . . . . . . . | . . . . . . huærs naudsyn kræfdi j þæim stodum er mæn æighv saman saud ok leigu mæn hafva ok kutung . . | . . . . . . . knapar ok vmfærdar mæn . . . . . . . . . . . . . . . . til skada er sialfr . . . . Noregs . . . . . . . . . . . . . . | . . . . . . . . t at eigi skulo hundar fleiri vera æn hær sægir: I Nordrꝍygium, j Kallzꝍy ij hvndar, annar hia | . . . . . . at Hvsum, æn annar j Mykladal; j Kunꝍy iij, æin j Sundi en tueir heima . . . . . . . . . . . . . . . . . . ; | j Arnafirdi . ; j Mula i; a Vidareidi ij; j Fughlꝍy ij, huar j sinvm bꝍ; j Svinꝍy ij. I Austrꝍy, a Eidi . . | . . . . . . gi iij; a Ꝍyri æin; a Sælatrum æin; at Skala ij, skal annar fylgia Andresi, en an . . . . . . . . . . . . . . . | . . . . . . . . . . j Elldivik ij; j Ꝍyndarfirdi ij; j Fuglafirdi ij; j Leirvik engi; j Gotu ij hia Þorbergi . . | Solmundarfirdi i; j Lambahagha æin; a Nesi ij. I Nordsꝍy hia Benedict ein saudhvndur ok ij fvglahvndar . . . . . . | huer sin fvglahvnd. I Stravmꝍy, j Saxhofn æin saudhvnd ok æin lirahvnd; j Tiornvvik i; j Hualvik i; j Kolla|firdi; ij; j Vestmannahofn iij; j Huiguvik æinm en eingi svdr fra Þorisgotu . . . . . . . . . . . . . . . | hia Grimi æin. I Sandꝍy, j Husauik æin til . . . fangs, en annar vngr; j Skalavik ij; a Sandi iij. I Skvfꝍy ein|gi saudhvndur, æn hafva skulo þeir j . . . . . . . ok ij lirahvnda, . . abyrgist hver sin . . . . . . . . . . . . . | Hvalbꝍ iiij,, skulo ij fyrir nordan a ok ij fyrir svnan . . . . . . g . . . . . . . Ordavik i; j Hofvi i hia Pali; j Faam . . | . . . . . . Porkerdi i; j Vagi ij, annar hia . . . . . . mi en annar hia Þorsteini . . . . . by æin . . . . . . j Bꝍ ok i Gasadal ængi; en i Sauruagi ok i Miduagi ok i Sandavagi skulo so margir vera sæm þeim | semr a haustþinhi ær skynsamastir æro. Skal þessvm hvndum vardveita enir skilrikastv | men ok vera hverium ok ollum iamheimolir bøar monnum. Skulo allir hafva drepit sina hvnda inn|nan v natta er þeir heim koma fra þingi ok sva þeir er fretta til. Var þetta gort a logþingi in|nan vebanda. Skal þessi skipan standa xij manadi nea os þikki leingr hꝍfva. Ok til sanz vit|nisburd setti Simun logmadr ok allir logrettu mæn vaar insigli fyrir þetta bref.
