= Havnar Róðrarfelag =

Faroese rowing club

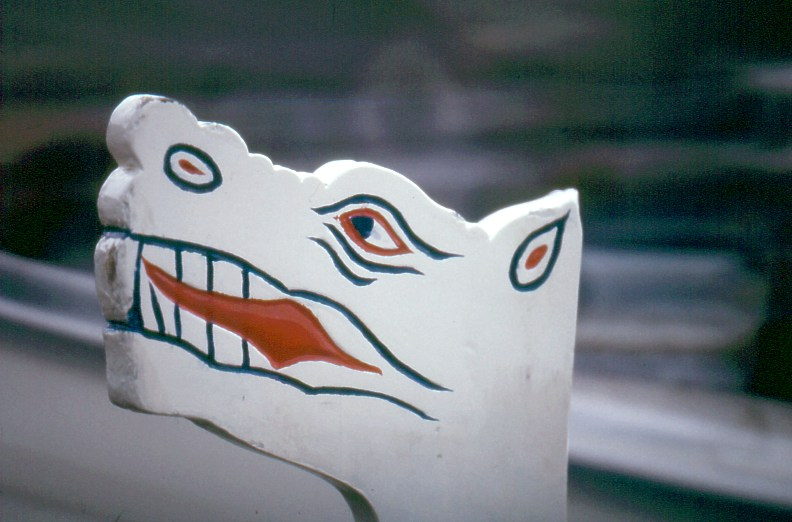
The dragon head is the symbol of the boats of Havnar Róðrarfelag, the stem of the boats is shaped as a dragon head.

Havnar Róðrarfelag is a Faroese rowing club in Tórshavn. Havnar Róðrarfelag was founded on 25 June 1932. The club is the most winning Faroese rowing club since 1973, and has won 61 Faroese championships, Argja Róðrarfelag comes second with 22 championships. The boats participate in the rowing competitions which are held around the islands in June and July, starting with Norðoyastevna in Klaksvík and ending with the final boat race at Ólavsøka in Tórshavn.

== Faroese Rowboats for Rowing Competitions ==
Havnar Róðrarfelag owns 8 wooden rowing boats, which are of all the sizes, which are used in Faroese rowing competitions; the boats are called 5-mannafar, 6-mannafar (both 5-mannafar and 6-mannafar are manned by 6 rowers and one steerman), 8-mannafar (manned by 8 rowers and one steerman) and 10-mannafar (manned by 10 rowers and one steerman). Havnar Róðrarfelag owns a large boat house, where the boats are stored, when they are not in use. Havnar Róðrarfelag owns these rowboats:

- Drekin, 5 mannafar
- Sílið, 5 mannafar
- Títlingur, 5 mannafar
- Gongurólvur, 6 mannafar
- Víkingur, 6 mannafar
- Ørvur, 8 mannafar
- Bláskelin, 10 mannafar
- Havnarbáturin, 10 mannafar

== Faroese Champions ==
Several of the boats of Havnar Róðrarfelag have won the Faroese championship. The champion is determined by seven races; it may take fewer, if the difference between the first two is more than seven points, which cannot be overcome. The winner of each race gets seven points, second place gets six points, etc. The boat which has most points after the final race on Ólavsøka wins the Faroese championship.

Boat name	Boat type	Type of race	Faroese Champion Year
Drekin	5-mannafar	Boys under 18	1993, 1996, 1997, 2012
Drekin	5-mannafar	Boys under 18	2008
Drekin	5-mannafar	Women	2003
Sílið	5-mannafar	Boys under 18	1973, 1974, 1978, 1983, 1992, 2002, 2003, 2008
Sílið	5-mannafar	Women	1974, 1976, 1980, 1981, 1982, 1985, 1995, 1996, 2002, 2005, 2007, 2008
Gongurólvur	6-mannafar	Women	1984, 1985, 1988, 1994, 1995, 2003, 2011
Gongurólvur	6-mannafar	Men	1981, 1982, 1983, 1984, 1996, 2005
Ørvur	8-mannafar	Men	1974, 1975, 1984, 1986, 1987, 1999, 2003
Havnarbáturin	10-mannafar	Men	1973, 1974, 1975, 1976, 1977, 1978, 1979, 1990, 1991, 1996, 2001, 2004, 2008

== The Board of Havnar Róðrarfelag ==
The board of Havnar Róðrarfelag is manned by five persons.

- Skarpheðin Njálson, chairman, elected in 2008
- Róar W. Dalsgaard, Secretary, elected in 2010
- Sigfríður á Plógv Hansen, Vice Chairman, elected in 2010
- Jóan Pauli Lamhauge, Chief financial officer, elected in 2008
- Eirikur á Kletti, board member, elected in 2010

== Photos ==
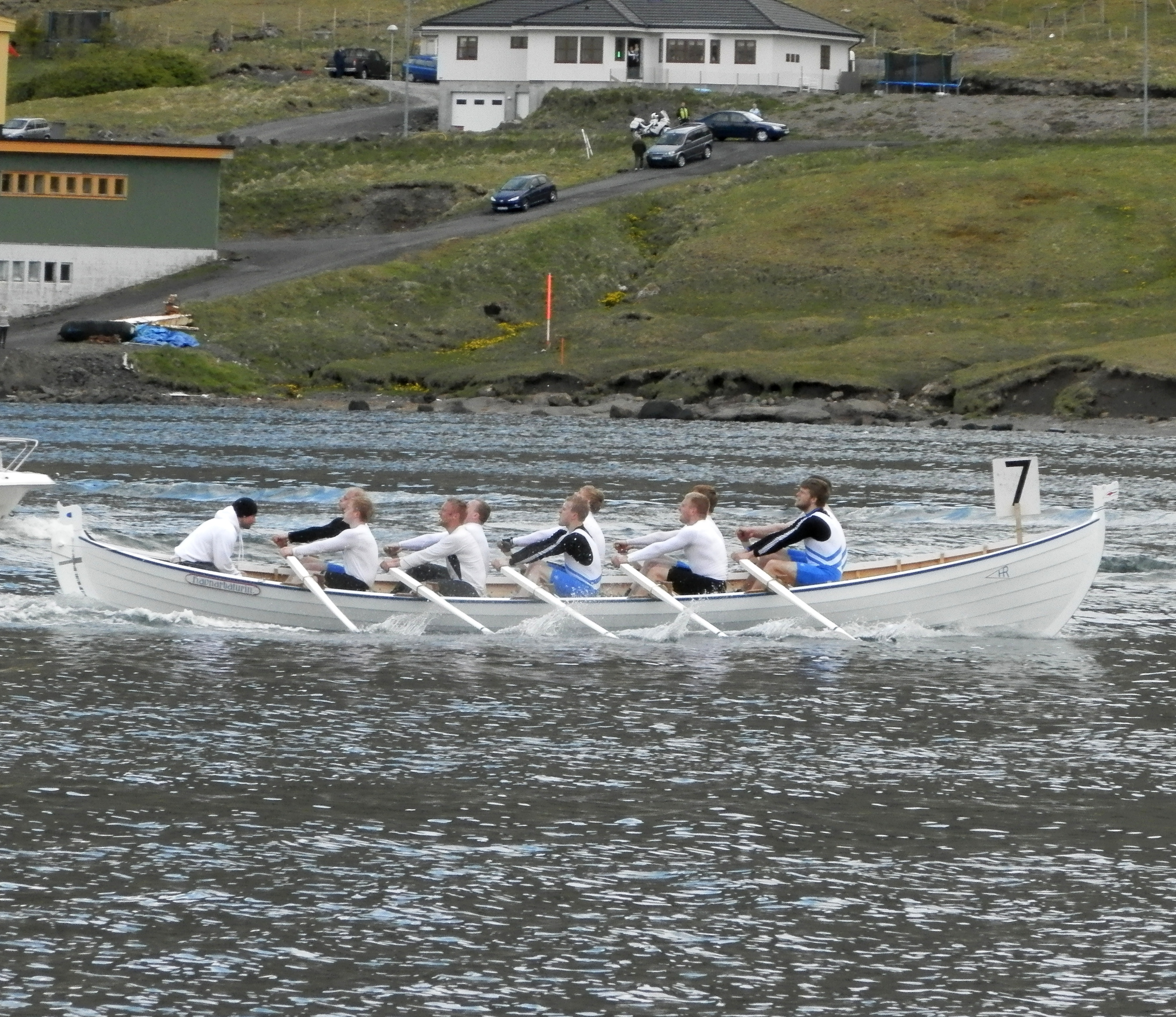
Havnarbáturin has won 13 Faroese Championships. In the period 1973-2011 it has won 53 gold medals, 54 silver and 41 bronze.

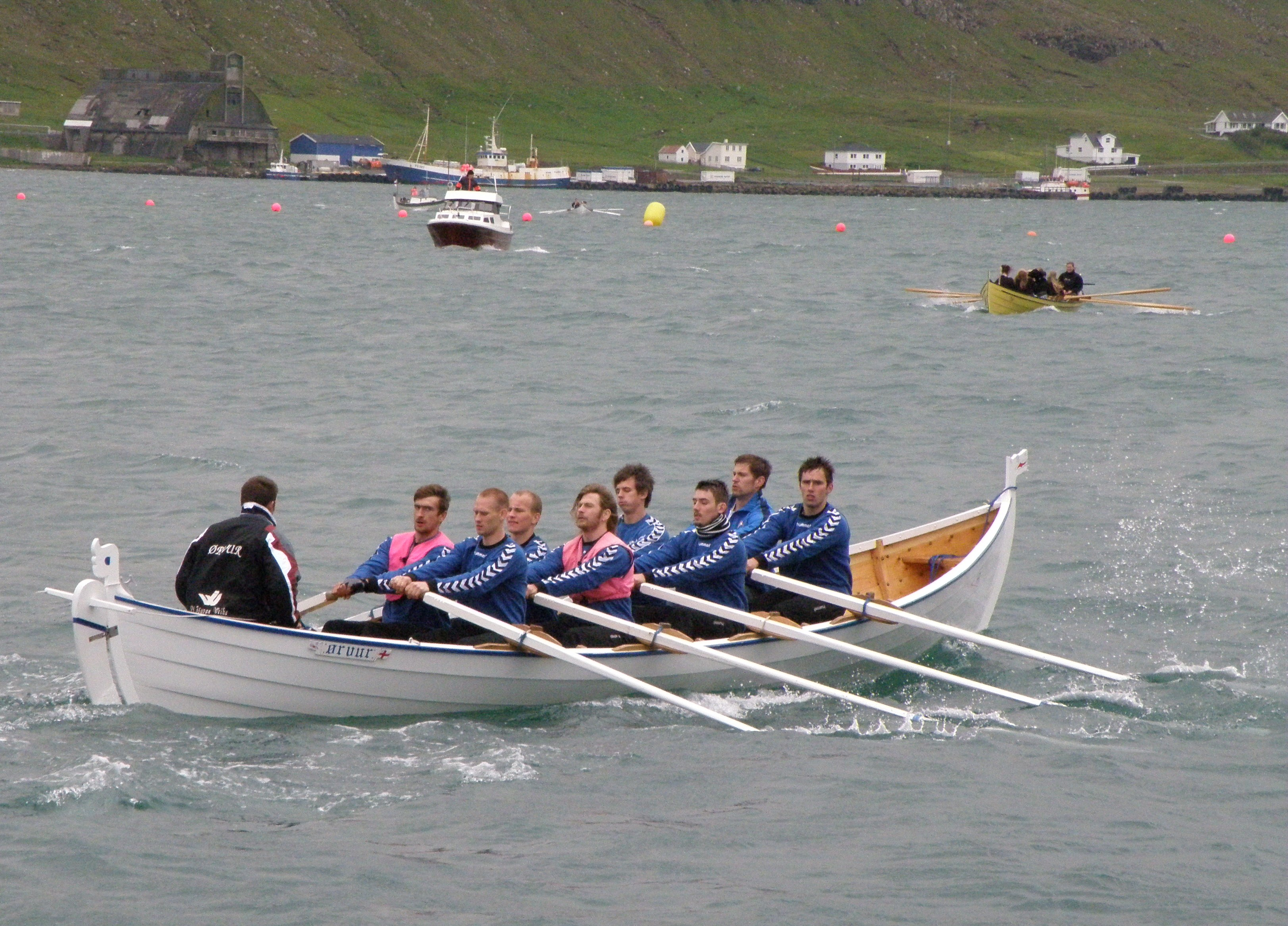
Orvur (Ørvur), 8-mannafar

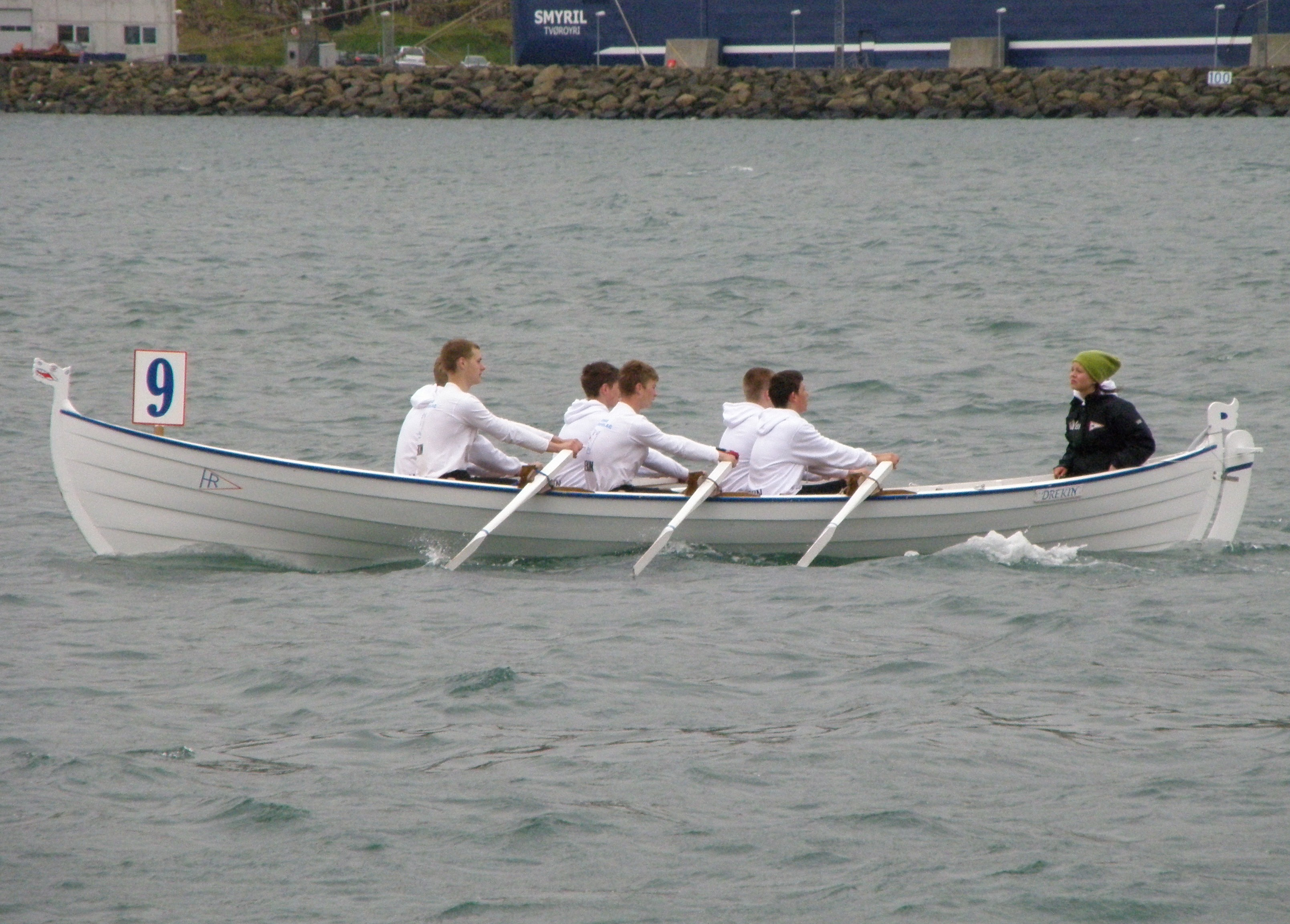
Drekin, after the boat race at the Joansoka Festival in Tvøroyri in June 2011.

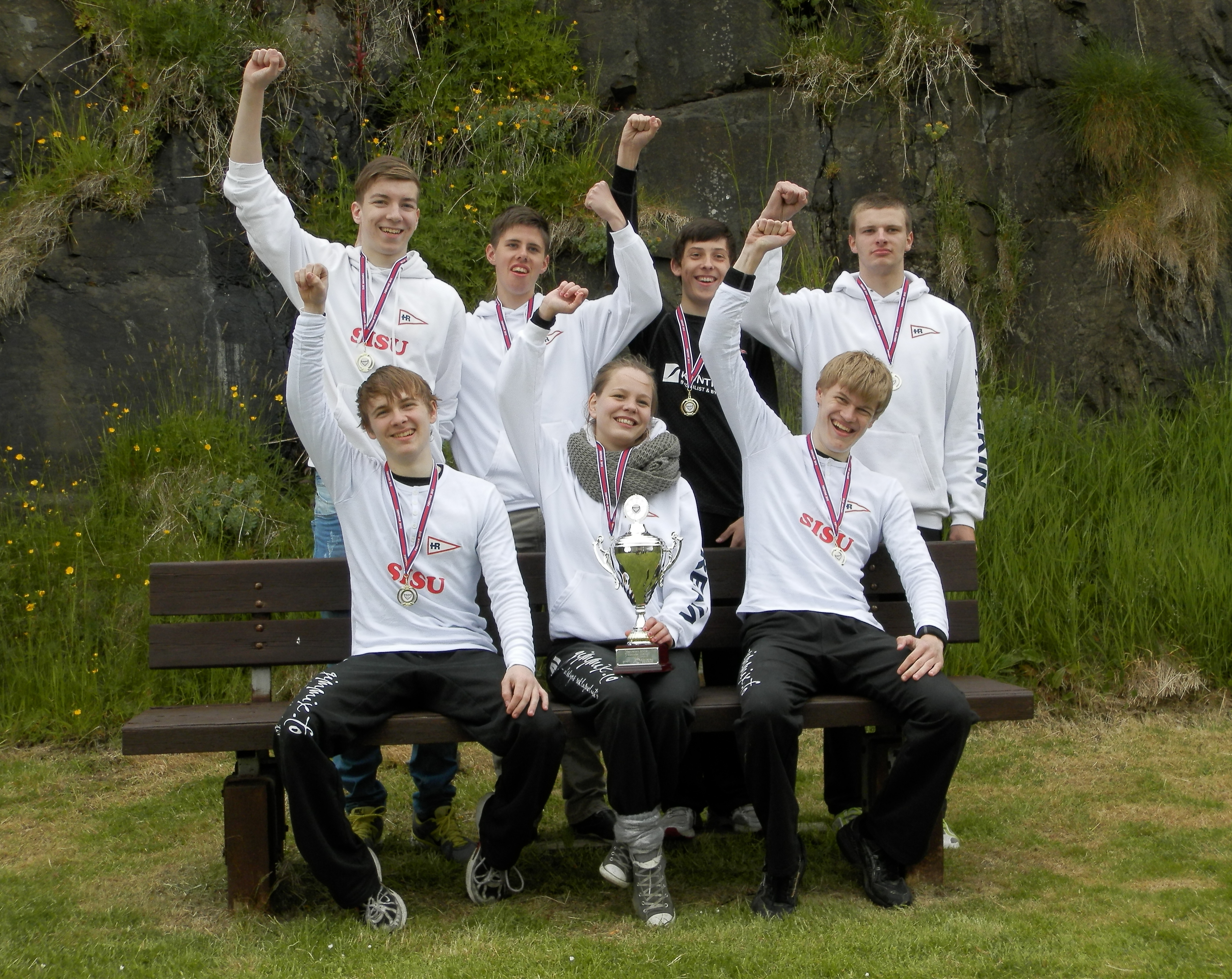
The crew of Drekin, who won the Jóansøka rowing race 2012 in the category 5-mannafør boy.

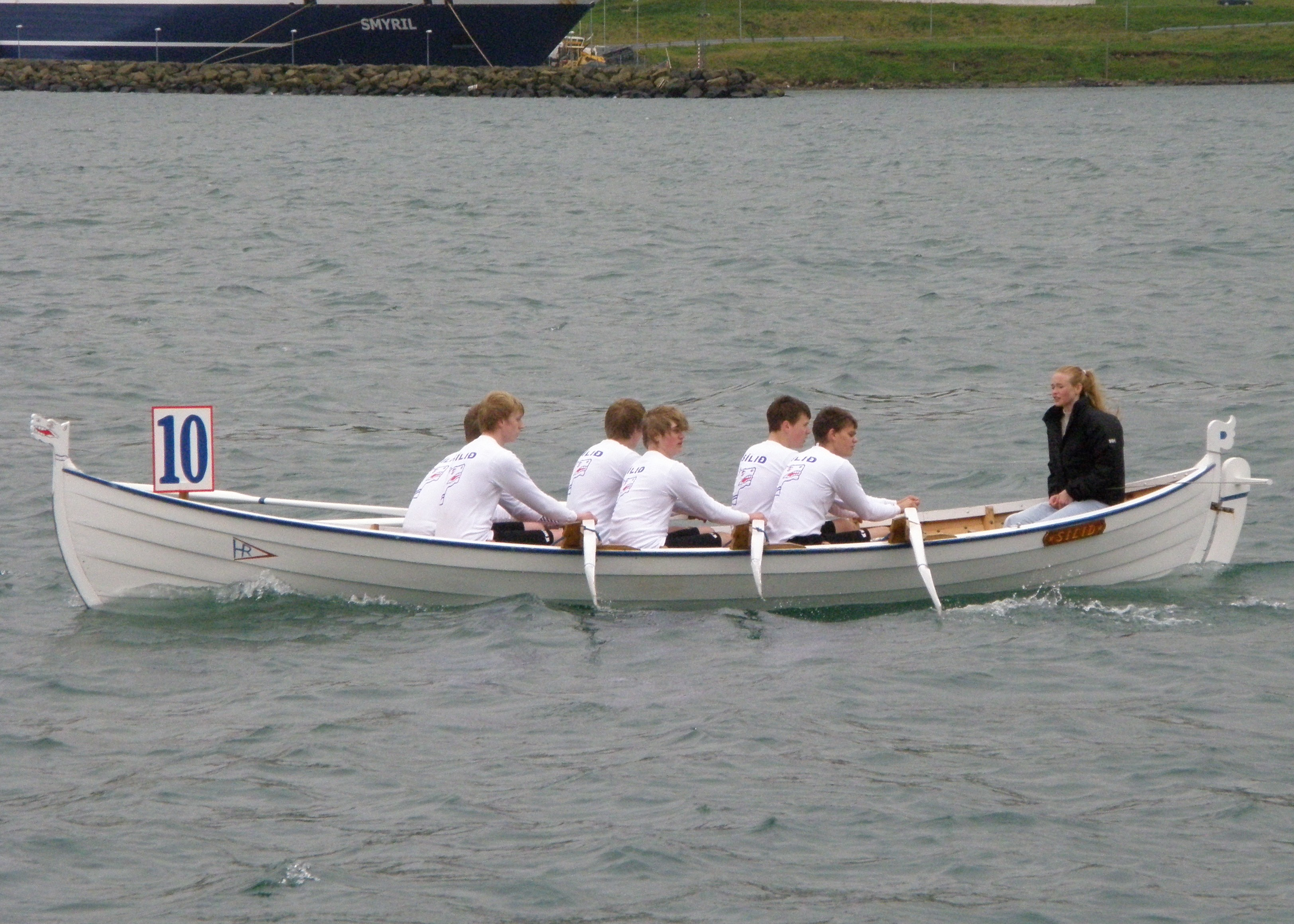
Sílið, 5-mannafør boys, 2011.

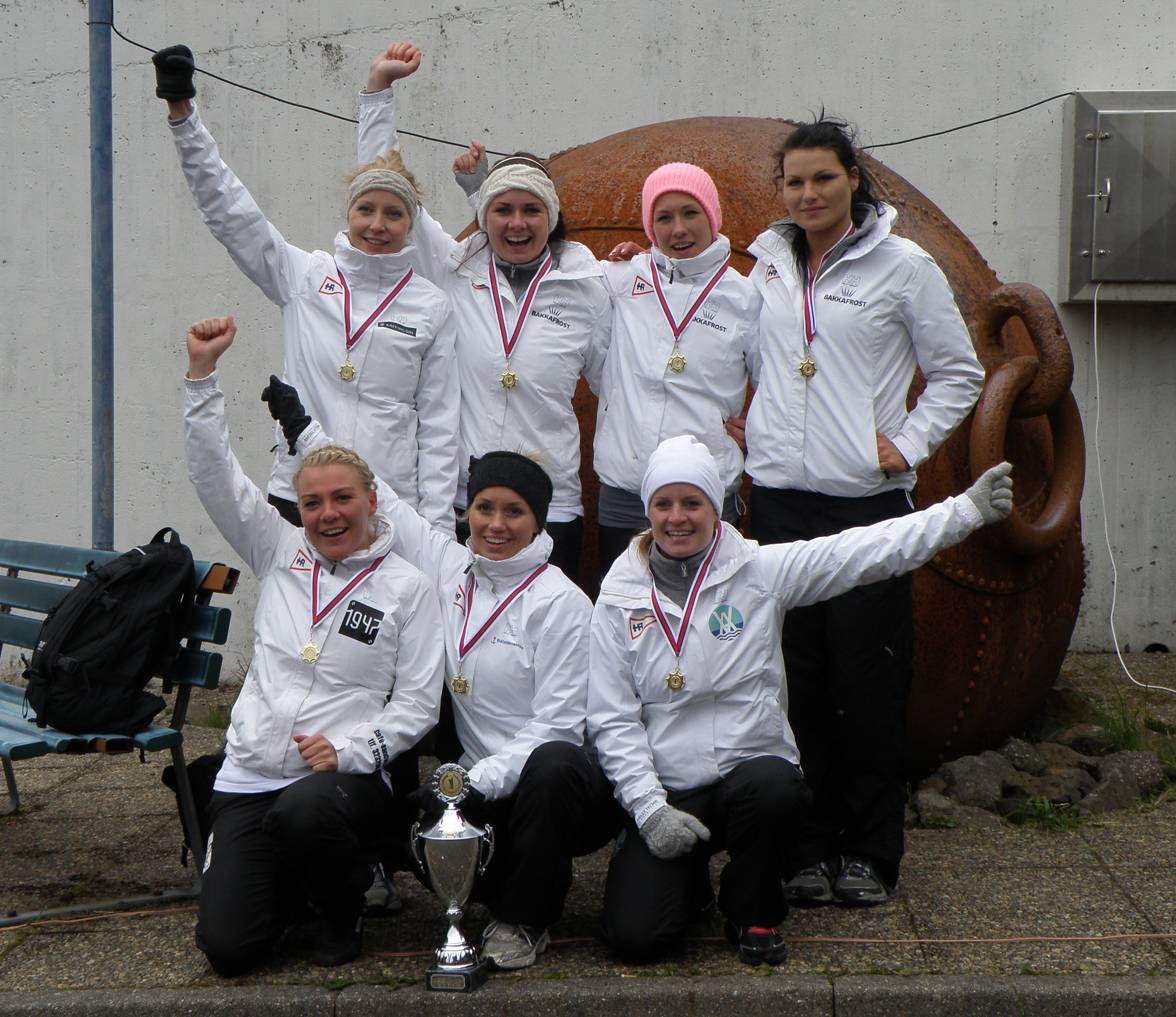
Gongurólvur, 6-mannafør women on Jóansøka 2011 which they won, they also won the Faroese Championship in 2011. The boat is the second most winning in the category 6-mannafar women with 43 gold, 42 silver and 30 bronze.
