= The Faroe Insurance Company =

Faroese insurance company

The Faroe Insurance Company (Faroese: Tryggingarfelagið Føroyar, TF), often referred to as Tryggingin, is an insurance company in the Faroe Islands. The company currently employs about 110 people and is headquartered in Tórshavn. The Faroe Insurance Company also has branch offices in Sandavágur, Saltangará, Klaksvík, and Tvøroyri. The company was founded as Tryggingarsambandið Føroyar (the Faroese Insurance Union) in 1965 and received its current name in 1998. Chairmen of the company have included Kristian Djurhuus, Johan Poulsen, and Hilmar Kass. Now known as "Betri Trygging"
