= Borðoy =

Island of the Faroe Islands

- Island
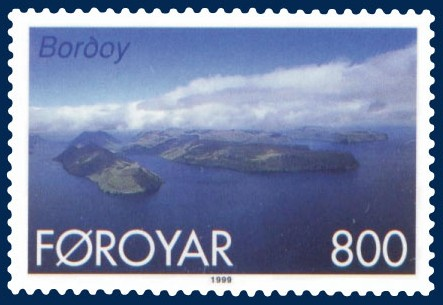
- Stamp FR 353 of Postverk Føroya (issued: 25 May 1999; photo: Per á Hædd)

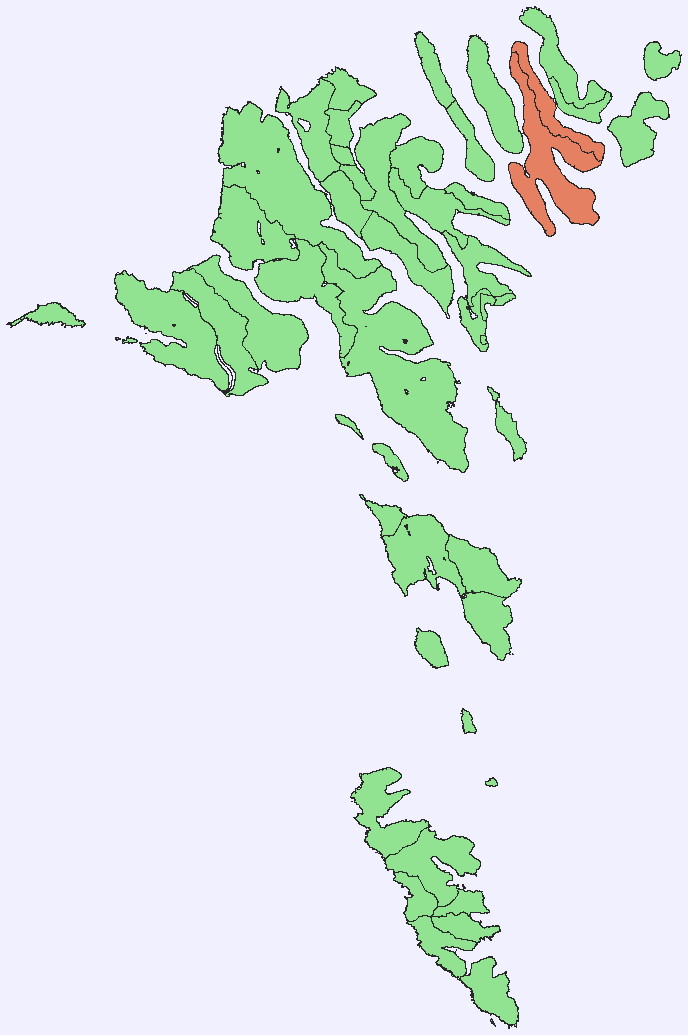
- Location within the Faroe Islands
- Coordinates: 62°14′N 6°33′W
- State: Kingdom of Denmark
- Constituent country: Faroe Islands

Area
  - Total: 96 km^{2} (37 sq mi)
  - Rank: 6
- Highest elevation: 755 m (2,477 ft)

Population (12-2021)
  - Total: 6,314
  - Rank: 4
  - Density: 66/km^{2} (170/sq mi)
- Time zone: UTC+0 (GMT)
  - Summer (DST): UTC+1 (EST)
- Calling code: 298

Borðoy (Faroese pronunciation: [ˈbɔɹɔɪ], Danish: Bordø) is an island in the north-east of the Faroe Islands. Its name means 'headland island'. There are eight settlements: Klaksvík (the second largest town in the Faroes), Norðoyri, Ánir, Árnafjørður, Strond, Norðtoftir, Depil and Norðdepil.

== History ==
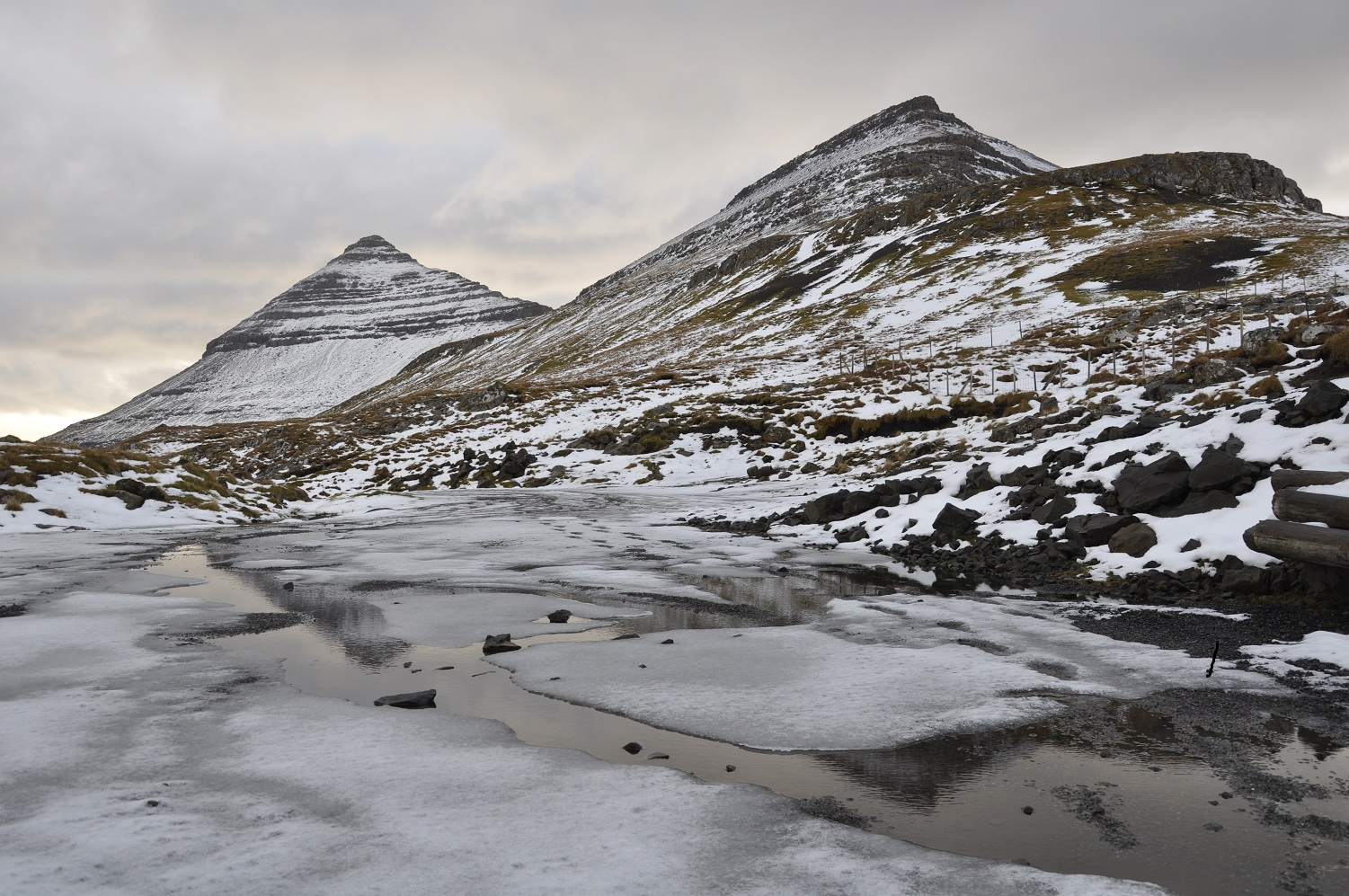
Háfjall (647 m, left) and Hálgafelli (503 m, right) on the island of Borđoy.

There are also three abandoned settlements: Skálatoftir, Múli and Fossá, all in the north. Múli was one of the remotest settlements in the Faroes – there was no road link until 1989, before which goods had to be brought in via helicopter or boat. The last people left in 1994.

A Klaksvík museum bought the Fossá area in 1969 with the plan of turning it into a typical Faroese Medieval village, though the plan never came to fruition.

== Important Bird Area ==
The northern and south-eastern headlands of the island have been identified as an Important Bird Area by BirdLife International because of their significance as a breeding site for seabirds, especially European storm petrels (250 pairs) and black guillemots (200 pairs).

== Mountains ==
The island has five mountains: Lokki (755 m), Háfjall (647 m), Borðoyarnes (392 m), Depilsknúkur (680 m), and Hálgafelli (503 m).
