= Norðdepil =

- Village
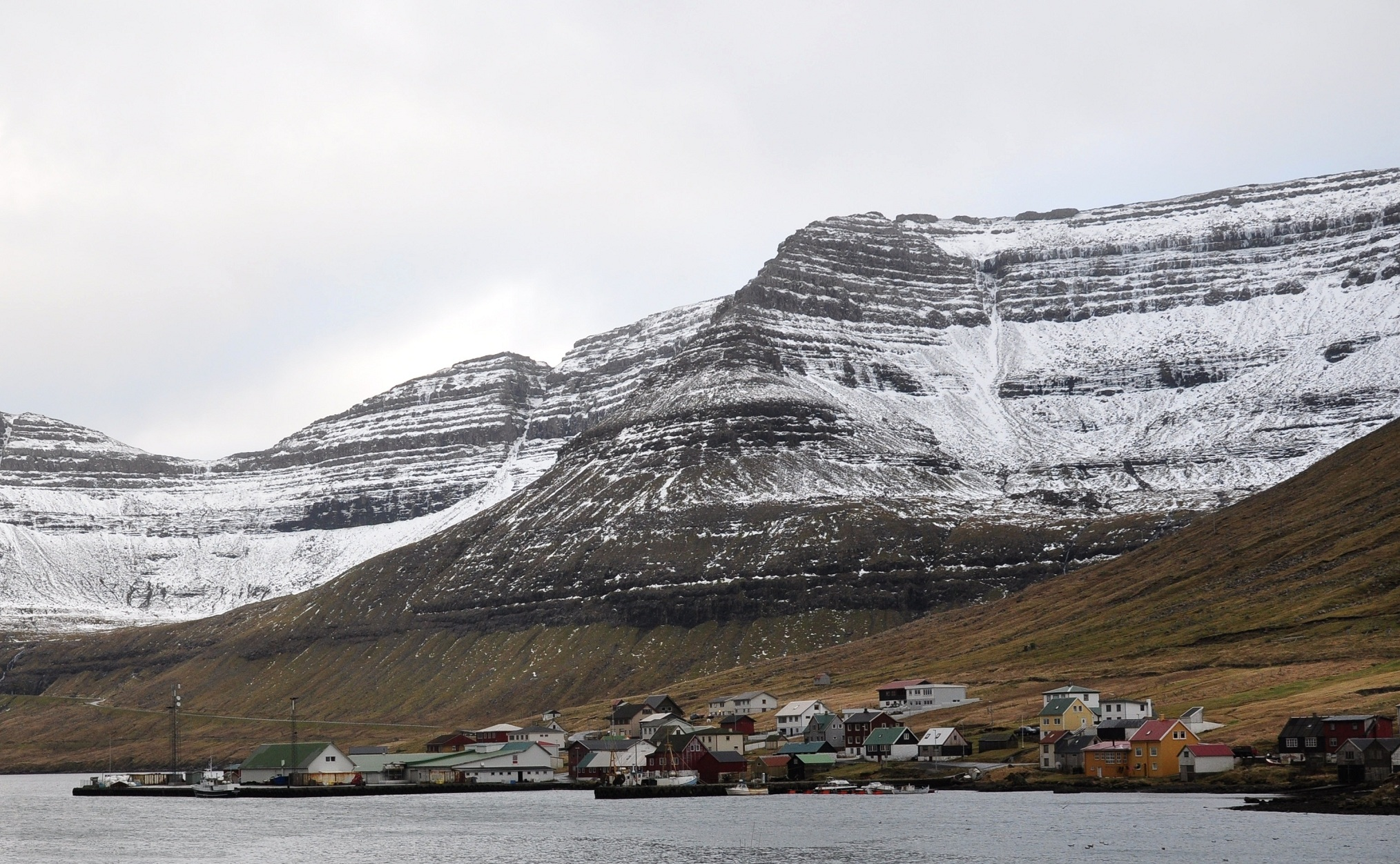
- Norðdepil on a cloudy October day

- Location in the Faroe Islands
- Coordinates: 62°17′51″N 6°31′32″W
- State: Kingdom of Denmark
- Constituent country: Faroe Islands
- Island: Borðoy
- Municipality: Hvannasund
- Founded: 1866

Population (September 2025)
  - Total: 151
- Time zone: GMT
  - Summer (DST): UTC+1 (EST)
- Postal code: FO 730
- Climate: Cfc

Norðdepil (pronounced [ˈnɔɹːdeːpɪl]; Danish: Norddeble) is a village on the east coast of the island of Borðoy in the Norðoyar Region of the Faroe Islands, facing the village of Hvannasund on Viðoy.

== History ==
Norðdepil was founded in 1866. Its school opened in 1895.

On 18 August 1941, around noon, a German Junkers Ju 88 bomber crashed in heavy fog into the mountainside above the village.

Norðdepil has been connected with the town of Hvannasund on Viðoy to the east by a causeway with a road on top since 1963. Because the two communities are located directly across from each other on opposite shores, they often act as one community.

Since 1967, two single-lane tunnels have connected Norðdepil with the regional city of Klaksvík.

Immediately bordering Norðdepil to its north is the abandoned settlement of Fossá, of which nothing remains. Fossá was named after some waterfalls.

Further north on the east coast of Borðoy there is a road going from Norðdepil to the abandoned hamlet of Múli.

=== Whaling station ===
In 1897 the whaling station Norddeble was constructed by Andorsen & Neumann, but whaling activity didn't start until 1898. Among the first owners was Peder Michelsen, who had been an accomplished gunner on the boat Urd, with Grøn at Gjánoyri. And for the first time we see the company Chr. Salvesen & Co. in the Faroes, the company which later started up the station Við Áir. The station started with one boat, Norddeble.

The well-known Faroese writer Sverri Patursson went on one trip with Norddeble in 1899.

The station was only active for part of the first season of 1898, but 54 whales were harpooned, which gave 1316 barrels of whale oil. In 1899 the station processed about 60 whales, of which 26 were blue whales, and got around 1700 barrels.

For the first four years, the station only had the boat Norddeble. In August 1902 the station bought a second boat.

1906 was a bad year for all whaling stations, and only Norddeble managed to produce more than 2000 barrels. 1907 was better and the station produced 2600 barrels, the good weather that season had a lot to say for the end result.

Michelsen was lost at sea on 28 December 1910 in Antarctica, and the company stopped whaling activities at Norðdepli in 1912. The station was sold to A/S Suderø, who attempted whaling in the season 1920, but it failed completely, and the station closed down.

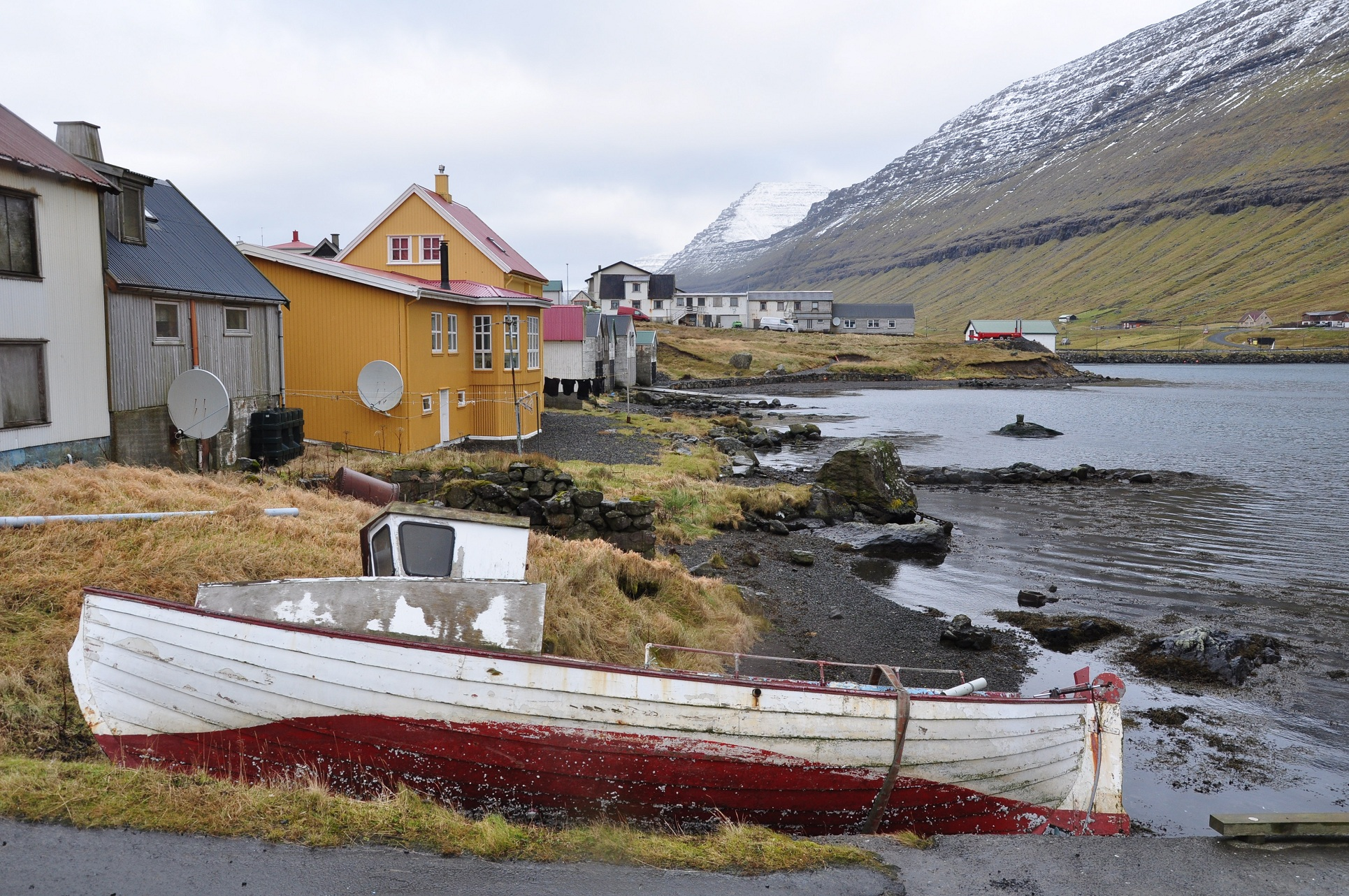
Harbour front in Norðdepil

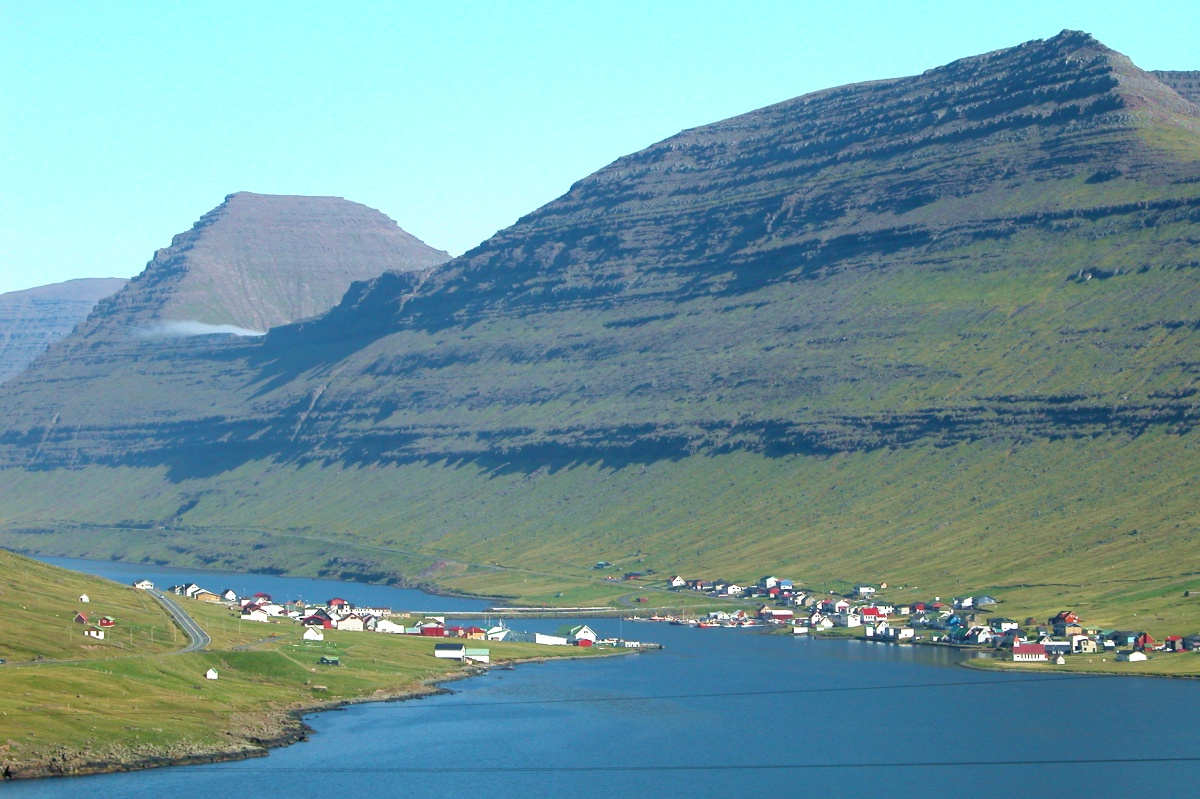
Norðdepil on Borðoy (left) and Hvannasund on Viðoy (right), with the causeway visible between them.

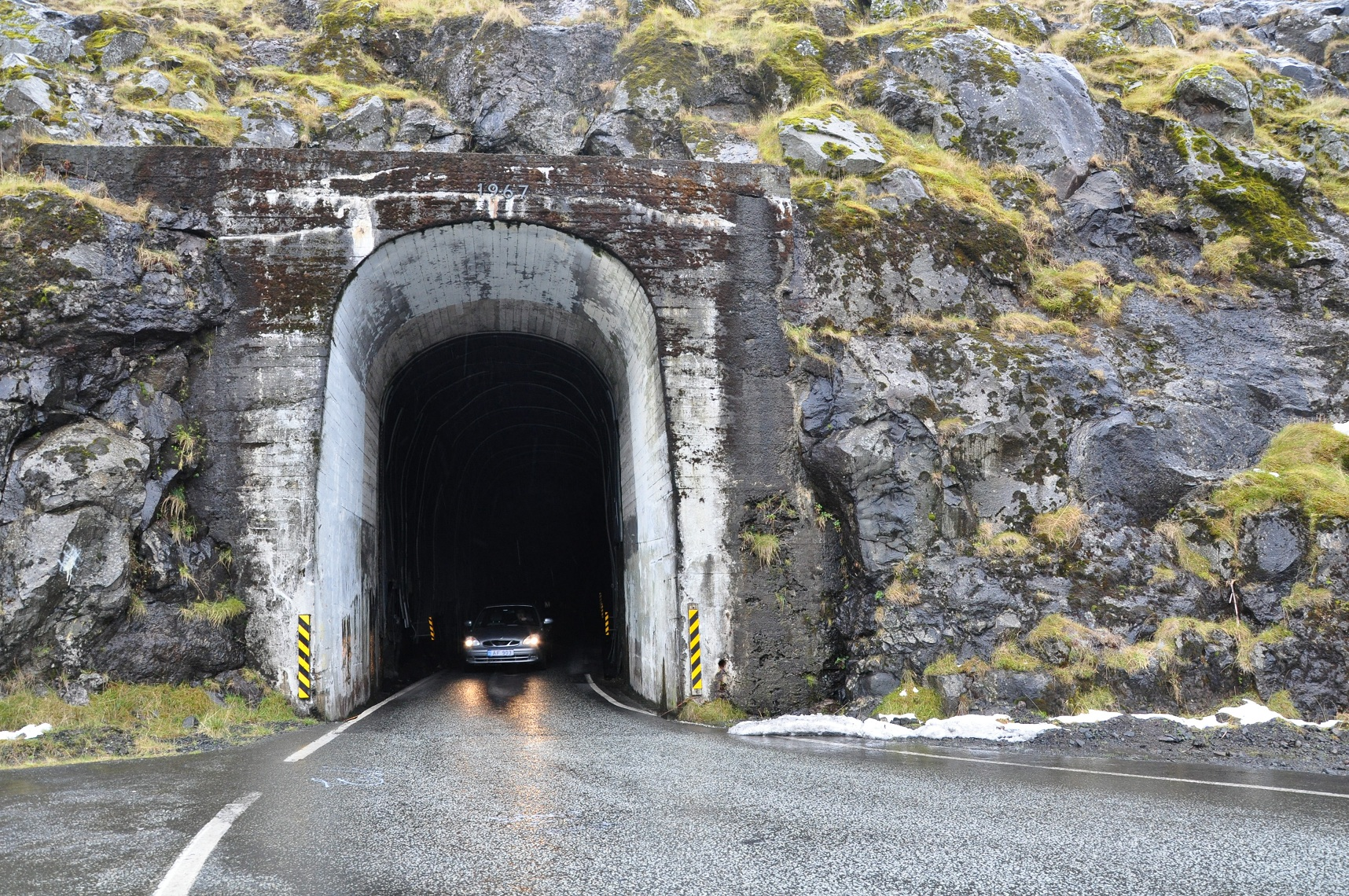
Entrance to the Hvannasundstunnilin

== See also ==
- List of towns in the Faroe Islands
