= Gásadalur =

Village in the Faroe Islands

- Village
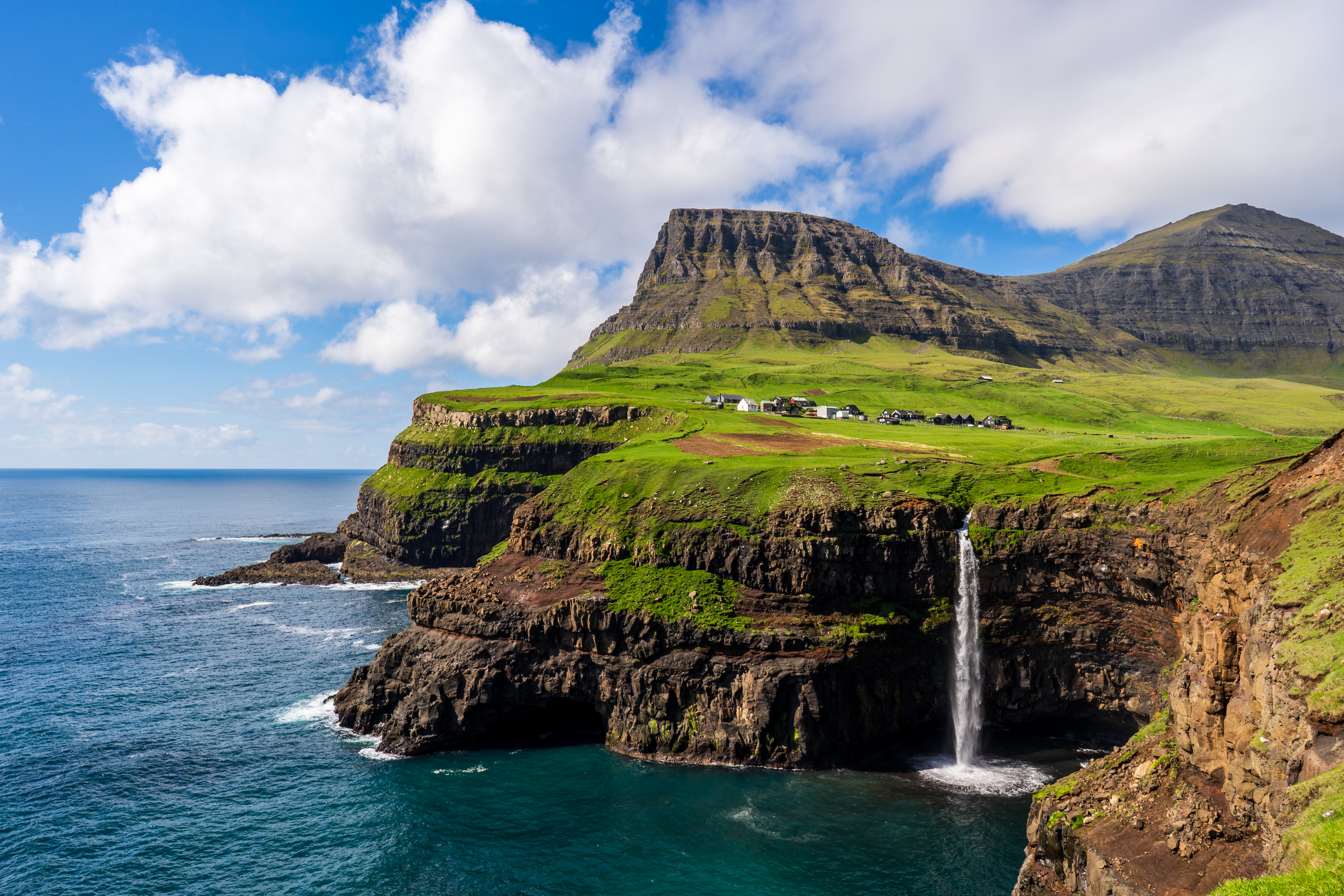

- Location in the Faroe Islands
- Coordinates: 62°6′44″N 7°26′5″W
- State: Kingdom of Denmark
- Constituent country: Faroe Islands
- Island: Vágar
- Municipality: Sørvágur
- Established: 9th century

Population (29 April 2025)
  - Total: 16
- Time zone: GMT
  - Summer (DST): UTC+1 (EST)
- Postal code: FO 387
- Climate: Cfc

Gásadalur (Danish: Gåsedal) is a village located on the west side of Vágar, Faroe Islands, and enjoys a panoramic view over to the island of Mykines.

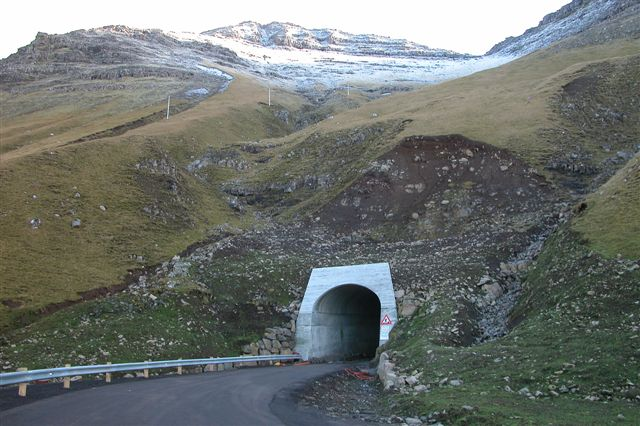
The Gásadalstunnilin single-lane tunnel, Oct 2005

Gásadalur is located on the edge of Mykinesfjørður, surrounded by the highest mountains on Vágar. Árnafjall towers to a height of 722 metres (2,369 ft) to the north, and Eysturtindur to the east is 715 metres (2,346 ft). Here too, the view south to Tindhólmur and Gáshólmur is quite magnificent. Eysturtindur translates to English as "the Peak in the East".

The boat landing site is very poor, because it is located somewhat higher than the seashore. So if the residents wanted to fish, they were obliged to keep their boats near Bøur. In 1940, during the British occupation of the Faroe Islands, a stairway was built from the beach up to the village.

In order to reach any of the other villages by land, residents had to take the strenuous route over mountains more than 400 metres (1,300 ft) high. This isolation explains why the village population had decreased. In 2002, there were only sixteen people living in Gásadalur, and several of the houses stand empty today. It had a population of 18 in 2012. It had a population of 11 in 2020.

In 2004, the Gásadalstunnilin tunnel was blasted through the rock, and it became possible to drive through by car. The residents hope this will mean that the village population will increase again. While the population increased briefly and reached a peak of 23 in 2010 it has only decreased since then and is at only 11 as of 2020. There are good opportunities for farming, and the same number of fields as in Bøur, but here only a few are royal estate, while most of them are freehold land.

== Etymology ==
There is a story that the village was named after a woman called Gæsa, who came from Kirkjubøur. She had eaten meat during the Lent fast, and for this unholy deed all her property was confiscated. She fled to the valley on Vágar, which was named after her. Most other village stories are about spirits and elves.

A more likely explanation is that Gásadalur (Goose Valley) is named after the wild geese, which from ancient times have traveled to the valley.

== Gallery of images of Gásadalur ==
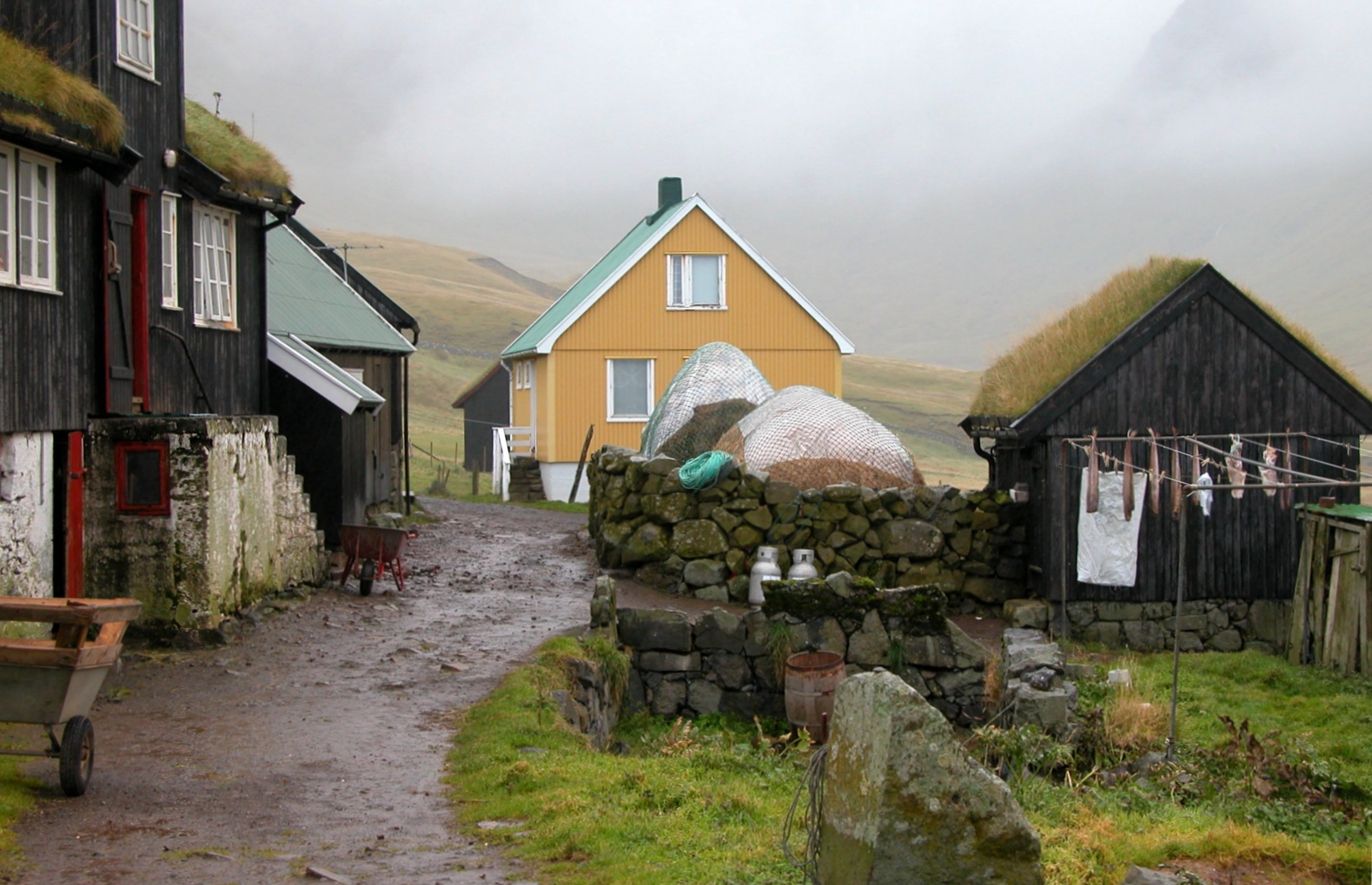
Village idyll

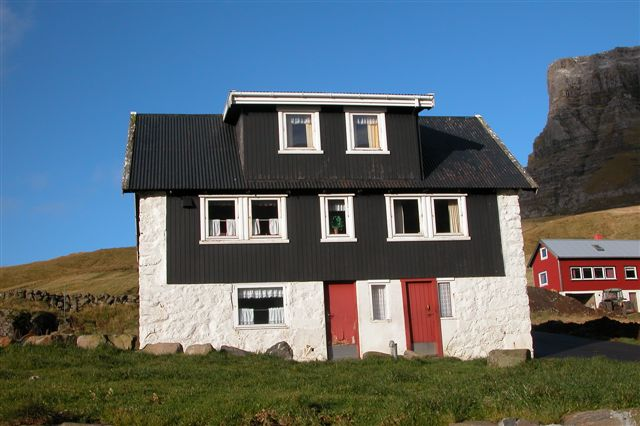
House in Gásadalur

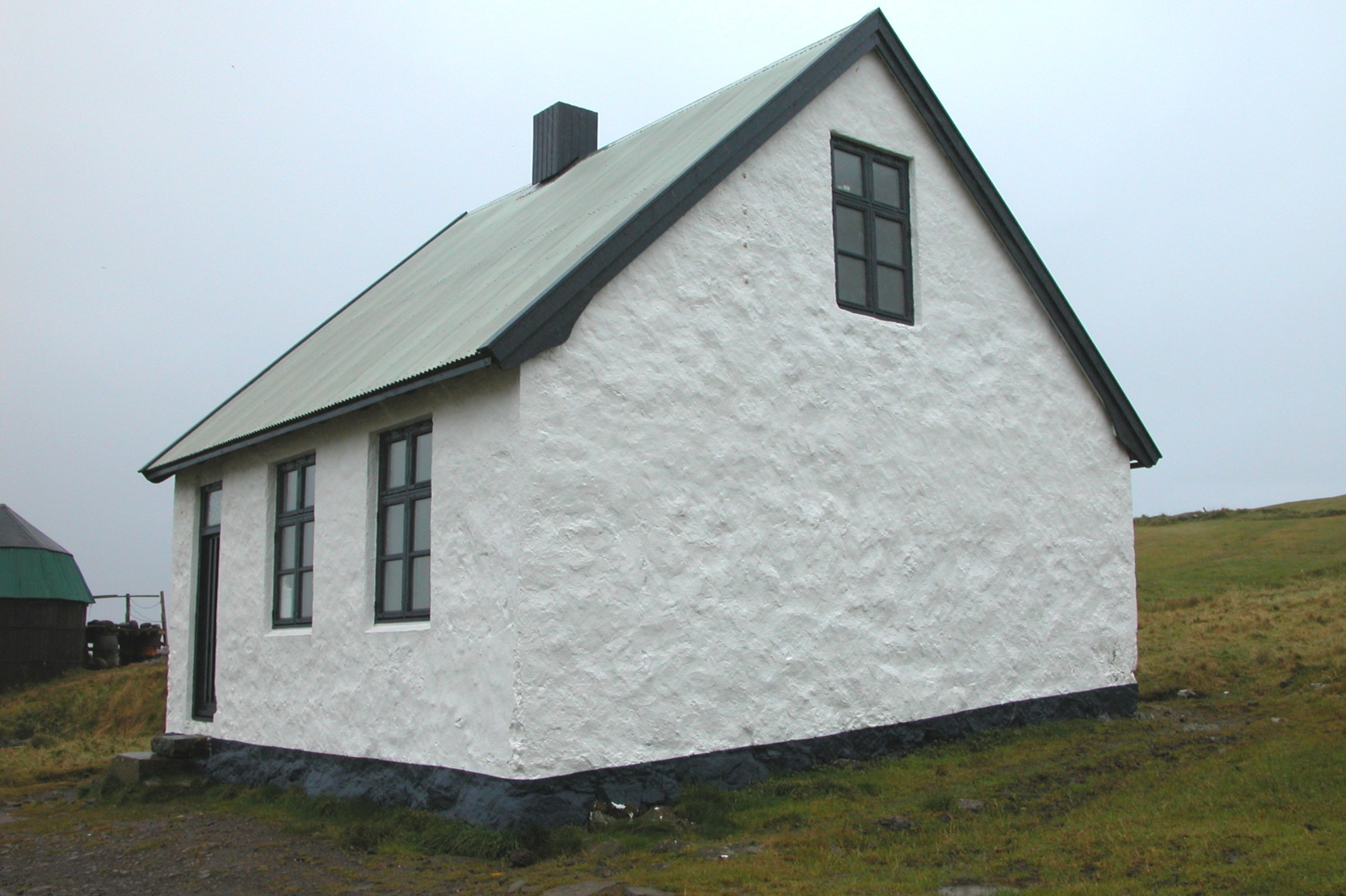
Parish hall of Gásadalur

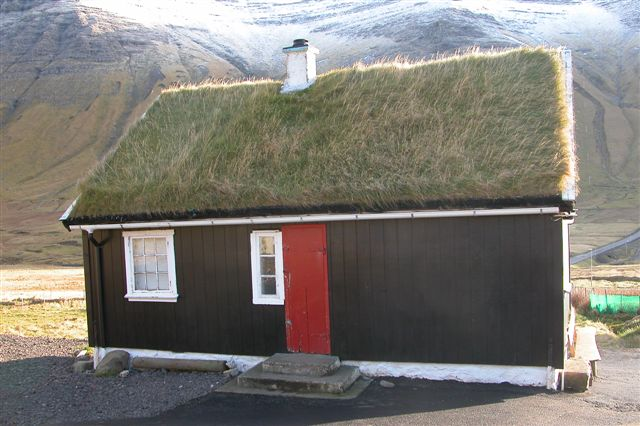
Small house with turf roof

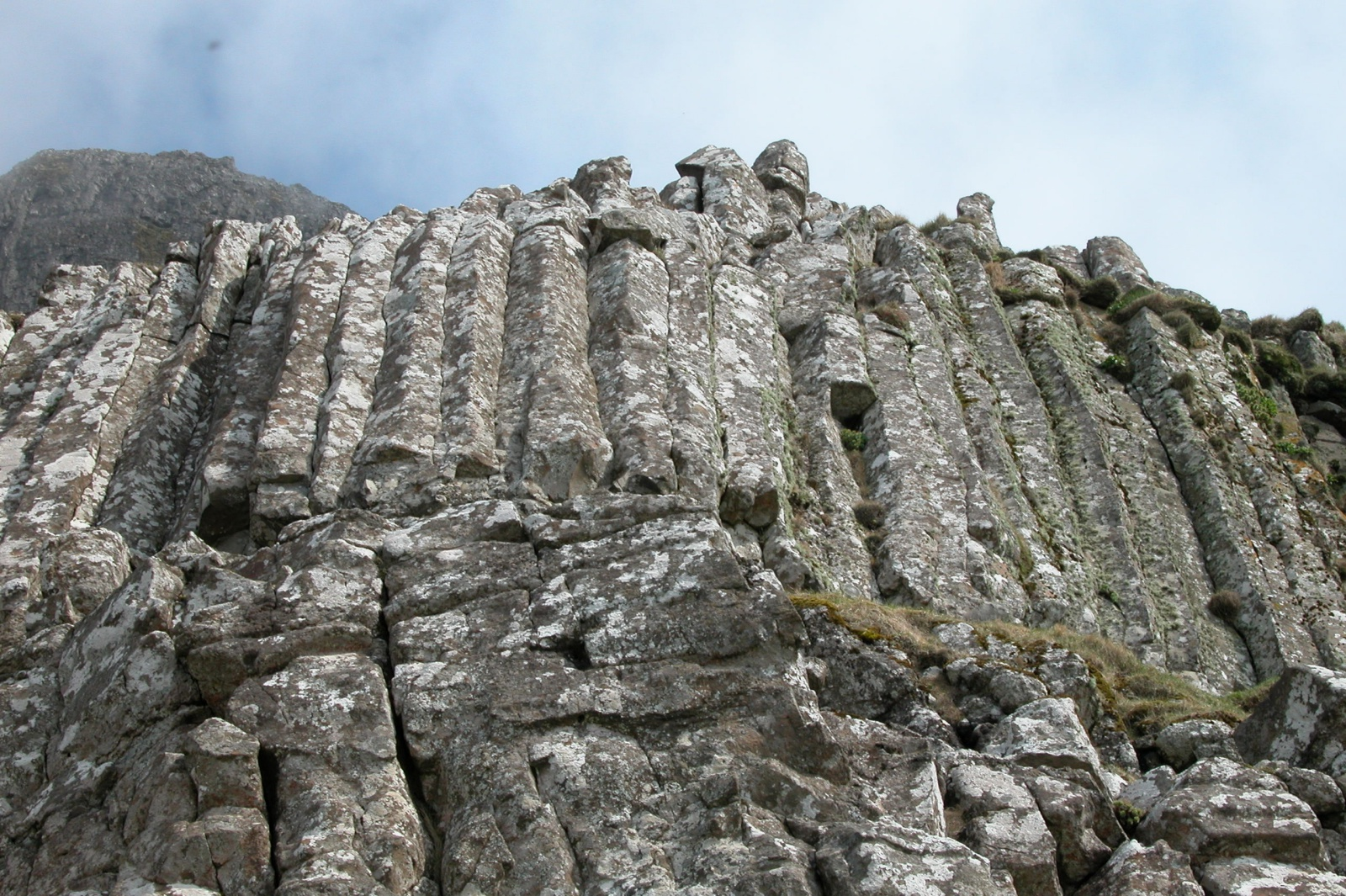
Basalt stacks at Gásadalur

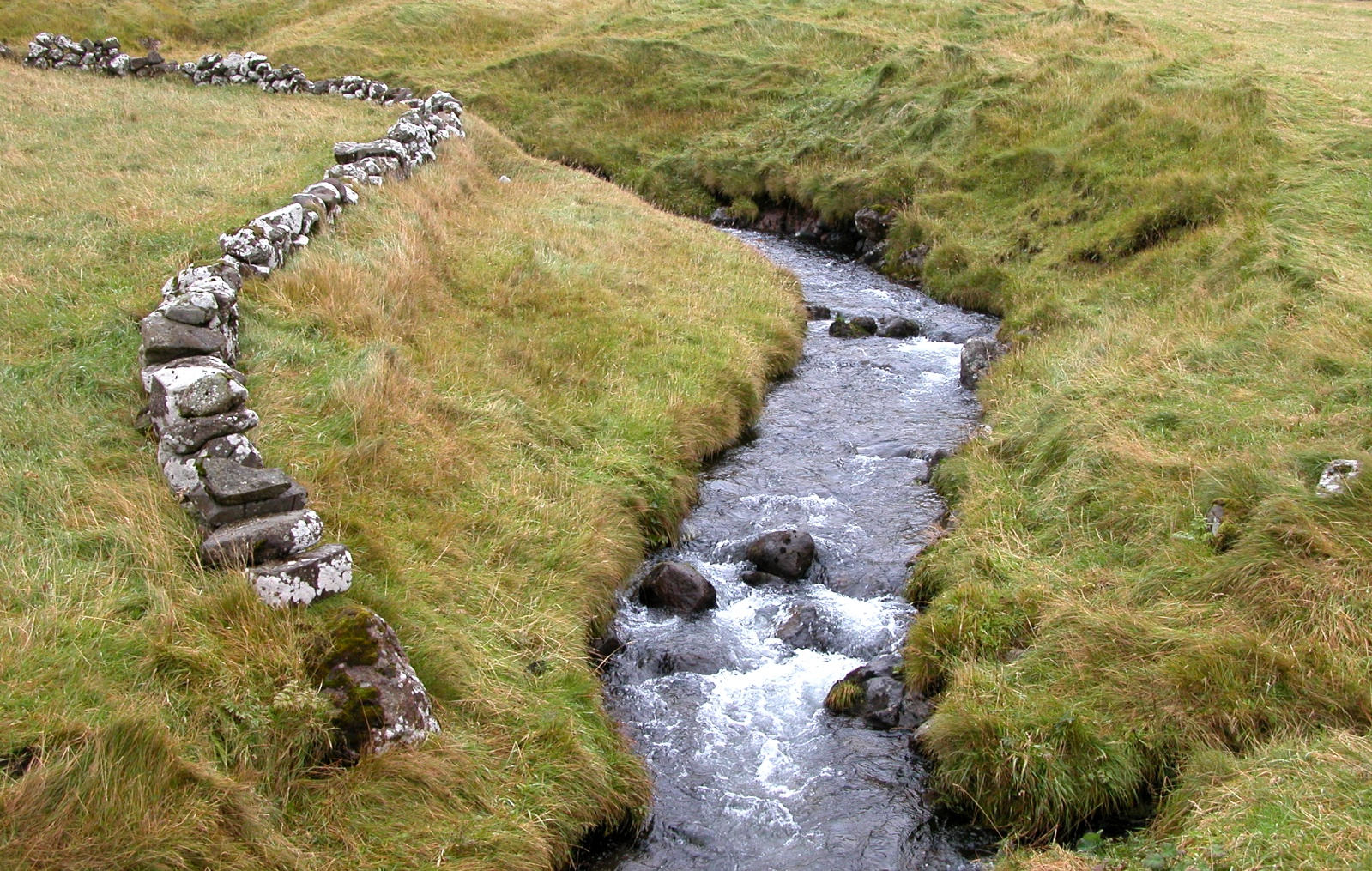
Stream in Gásadalur

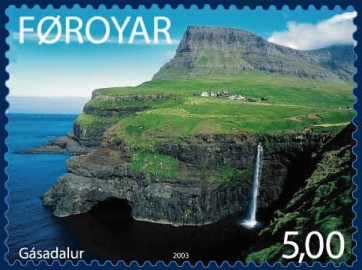
Stamp FO 453 of the Faroe Islands, 2003

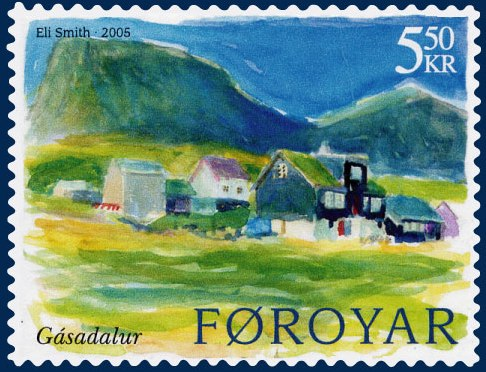
Stamp FO 506 of the Faroe Islands, 2005

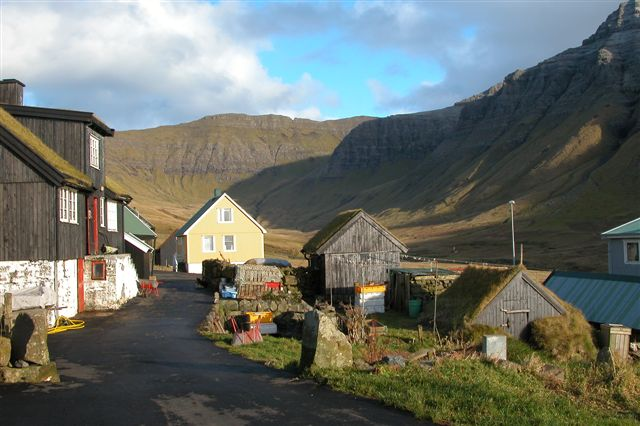
Gásadalur, Faroe Islands, October 2005

== See also ==
- List of towns in the Faroe Islands
