= Breiðá =

River on the island of Vágar in the Faroe Islands

Coordinates: 62.0667°N 7.33333°W

Breiðá is a river on the island of Vágar in the Faroe Islands. The name Breiðá translates to 'the broad river'. It flows from the lake Vatnsdalsvatn into Sørvágsfjørður. It is the natural boundary between the villages of Sørvágur and Bøur.
