= Islets and skerries in the Faroes =

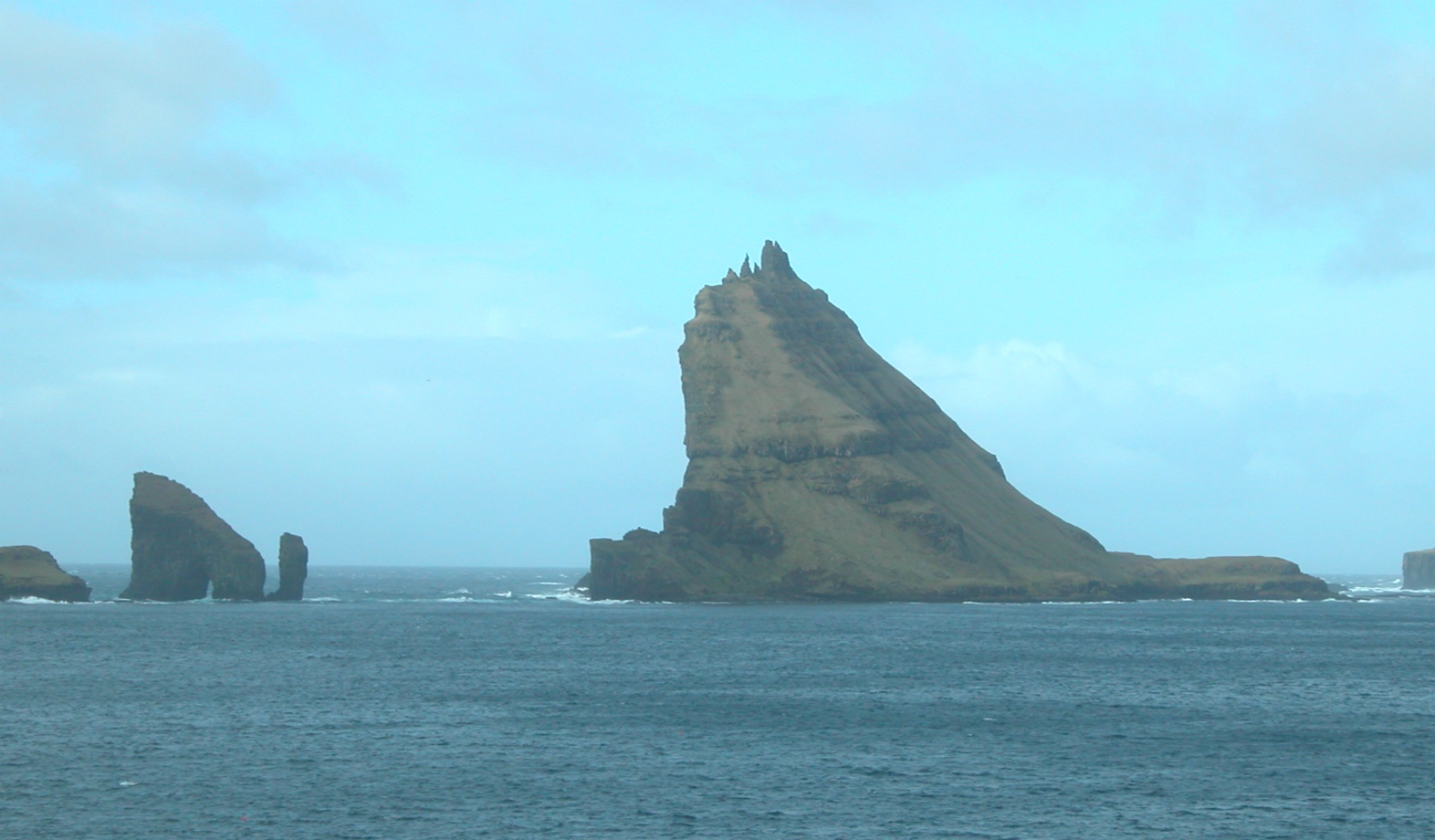
Tindhólmur is the largest islet of the Faroe Islands.

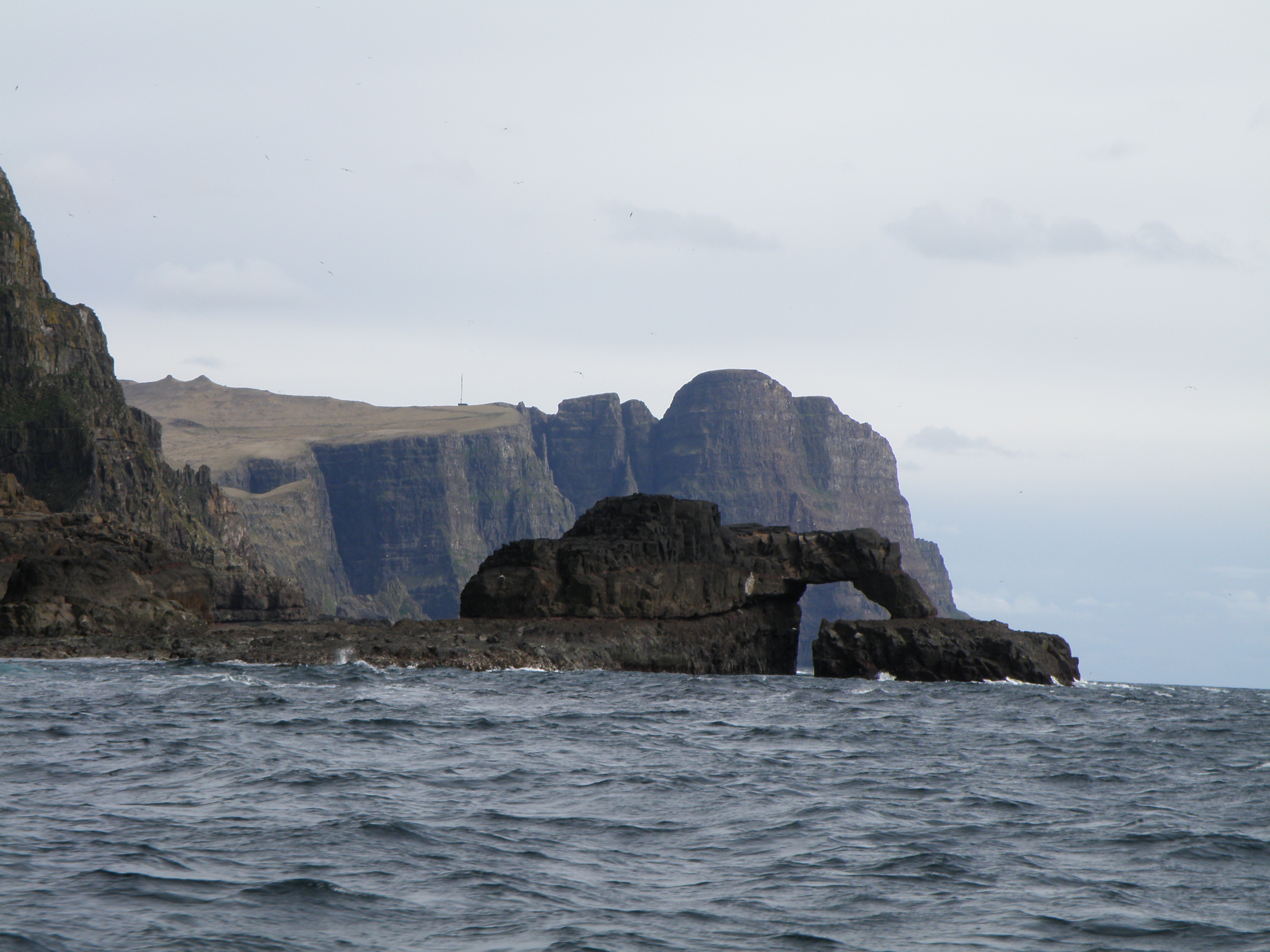
Near the west coast of Suðuroy are many skerries, some islets are all around the island also. This skerry is called Kamarið, which means "The Chamber". Beinisvørð is in the background.

Besides the 18 islands of the Faroes there are also several islets and skerries. The Faroe Islands consist of 18 islands with many small islets and skerries. islets are small and are geographical parts of the larger islands. Suðuroy consists of 263 islands, islets and skerries, which is the largest number. The islets are measured in square hectometers (hectares), the largest being comparable in size to the smallest island, Lítla Dímun.

Largest islets:

1. Tindhólmur (65,0 sq hm), at Sørvágur Vágar
2. Mykineshólmur (45,0 sq hm), at Mykines
3. Trøllhøvdi (19,0 sq hm), at Skopun Sandoy
4. Gáshólmur (10,0 sq hm), at Sørvágur Vágar
5. Tjaldavíkshólmur (7,5 sq hm), at Øravík Suðuroy
6. Sumbiarhólmur (7,0 sq hm), at Sumba Suðuroy
7. Lopranshólmur (3,4 sq hm), at Lopra Suðuroy
8. Kirkjubøhólmur (2,0 sq hm), at Kirkjubøur Streymoy
9. Hovshólmur (1,7 sq hm), at Hov Suðuroy
10. Hoyvíkshólmur (0,8 sq hm), at Hoyvík Streymoy
11. Baglhólmur (0,8 sq hm), at Víkarbyrgi Suðuroy
12. Grønhólmur, (0,4 sq hm), at Streymnes Streymoy

Besides these islets there are also numerous skerries around the Faroes. The most famous is probably Sumbiarsteinur (also known as Munkurin in the south of Suðuroy. Munkurin means the Monk, the name is referring to the fact that Sumbiarsteinur is lying to itself, while the other skerries are close together. This group of skerries are called Flesjarnar. Munkurin is the southernmost point of the Faroes at 61° 10' 30".85 N, 6° 40' 23".77 W. Flesjarnar can be seen from Sumba, Akraberg and from Eggjarnar and other high places in Suðuroy.
