= Geology of the Faroe Islands =

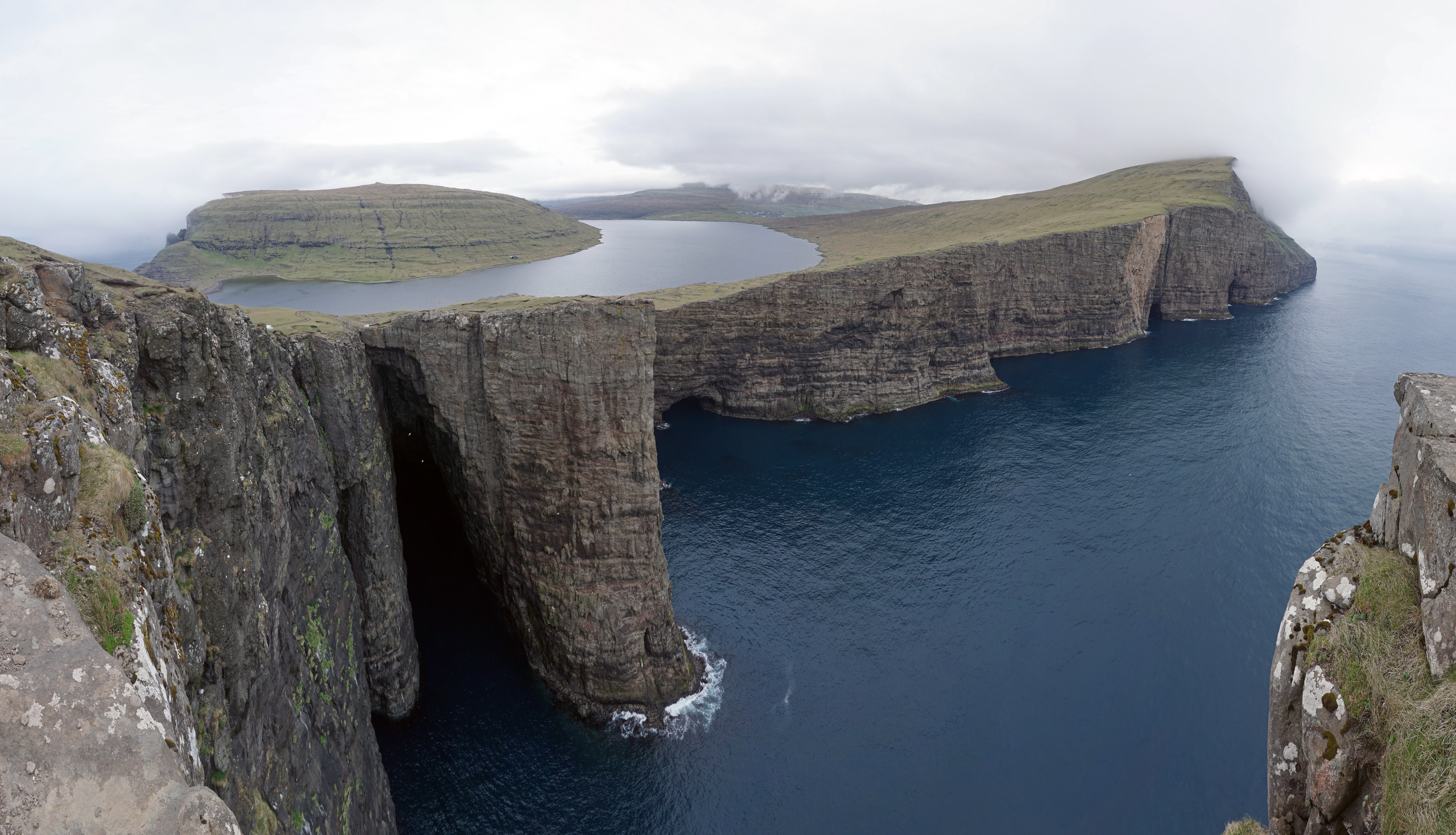
The island of Vágar

The geology of the Faroe Islands shows parallels to the geology of Iceland, although volcanism in the Faroe Islands has ceased. Geologically, the Faroe Islands are around 60 million years old. The Faroe Islands lie on the Wyville-Thomson Ridge, a ridge within the Eurasian Plate, between Scotland, Norway and Iceland. The islands are of volcanic origin and are made up of three layers of basalt, with the top and bottom layers resembling each other. The age of this rock is between 54 and 58 million years, with the oldest material at the bottom.

== Paleogene ==
The Faroe Islands were formed during a period of a few million years, some 55 million years ago in early Paleogene times, when Europe and Greenland started to separate, opening up what became the Northeast Atlantic Ocean. Countless volcanic eruptions built up a huge basalt plateau that covered almost the entire Faroe–Rockall region, together with the southeastern part of Greenland. In simple terms, each basalt lava flow of today's Faroe Islands represents one volcanic eruption during that time period.

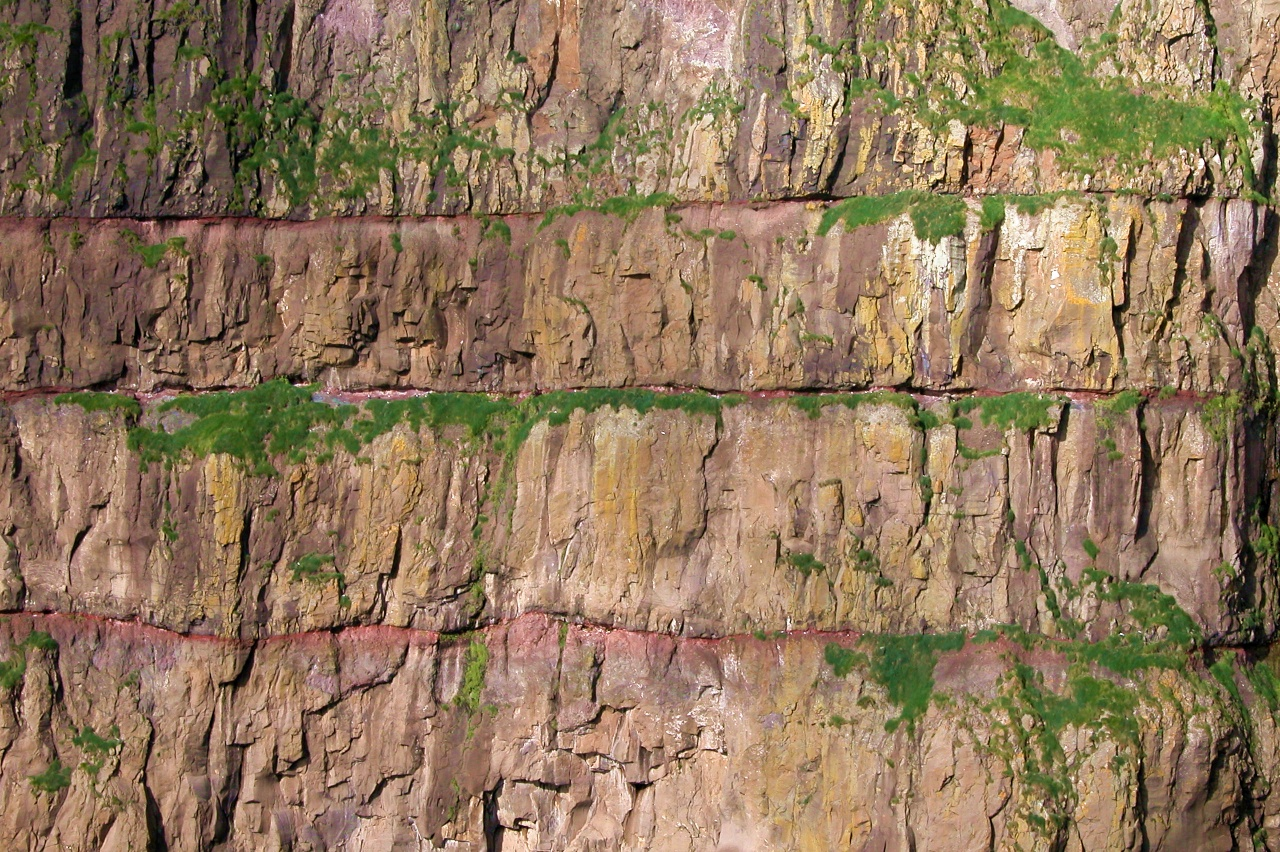
Basalt and tuff layers at Fámara, Suðuroy

Some volcanic eruptions produced voluminous sheet flows each with a thickness of several tens of meters and covering hundreds of square kilometres. Others built up compound lava flows each composed of several thin basalt layers. Some eruptions were violent and produced large volumes of volcanic ash that can be found in between the lava flows. Other strata between the basalt layers contain volcaniclastic and other sediments that indicate the long time intervals between eruptions, with rich vegetation taking root in a sub-tropic climate, and with local erosion or deposition of sediments in rivers and shallow lakes.

One volcanically silent time period was especially long and resulted in the deposition of several sedimentary layers of varied composition, including strata rich in organic material that subsequently have generated considerable volumes of coal. In recent times the coal has been worked from mines in between the basalt flows near the northern villages of Suðuroy. Coal layers on Suðuroy and Mykines show imprints of dawn redwood and ginkgo.

Over the 54 million years since the last flows erupted, plate tectonics has slowly moved the Faroe Islands away from the active volcanic region, which today is concentrated in Iceland and along the Mid-Atlantic Ridge. Meanwhile, the majority of the Faroe–Rockall Plateau has subsided beneath sea level while erosive forces–especially during the last few million years of alternating glacial and interglacial periods–have sculpted the landscape into their present-day shape.

== Quaternary ==
About 2.4 million years ago, Quaternary glaciers, which covered the whole island during the ice ages, formed the Faroe Islands in their present form from the remains of this plateau. The glaciers migrated along the natural path on the inclined plane to the southeast and formed the characteristic trough valleys from the existing gorges . These valleys often filled with water, created a connection with the sea and formed the present-day straits and fjords of the Faroe Islands. The largest lake in the Faroe Islands, Sørvágsvatn, almost became a fjord, but remained 32 meters above sea level.

== East coast and inland ==
The overall thickness of volcanic and intervening rock layers of the Faroe Islands is more than 6 kilometres (3.7 mi), of which only 900 metres (3,000 ft) is located above the present sea level. A 3.5-kilometre (2.2 mi) deep well in Lopra, Suðuroy, has revealed details of the lower strata.

Where the glaciers originated, there are now semicircular cirques. These are often the fjords' ends, which are reminiscent of place names such as Kaldbaksbotnur. Flat sandy beaches sometimes formed in the bays, as in Tjørnuvík.

The longest trough valley (U-shaped valley) in the Faroe Islands is the 11 km long valley between Saksun and Hvalvík, the Saksundalur. Here, as in other places throughout the interior and on the east coast, there is a typical staircase structures of the slopes that the glaciers have formed from the basalt and tuff layers. The vertical side of such a step is called hamar in Faroese, hence the place name Hamrabyrgi. The flatter, grassy slopes between the hamrar are called rók (pl. røkur). They were formed from the weathered tuff. At the foot of each hamar, more rubble collects. Streams rush down as waterfalls.

The highest mountains in the Faroe Islands still bear witness to the former plateau. They are often table mountains. The highest mountain in the archipelago, Slættaratindur (880 meters), takes its name from this fact (flat summit). To the north it slopes relatively gently (not vertically) into the Atlantic Ocean and is thus considered the highest of its kind in Europe sloping directly out of the sea.

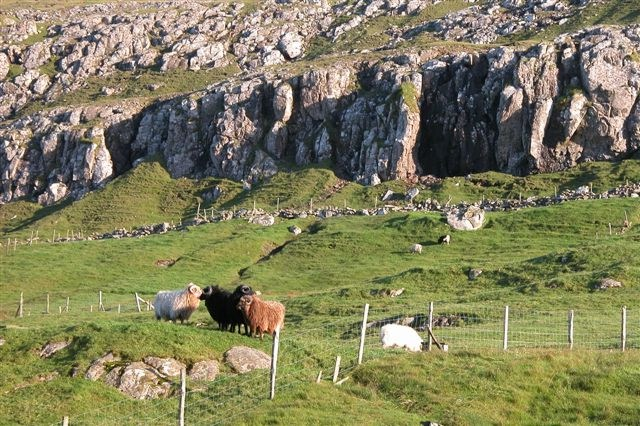
A steep basalt step

Many other mountains are ridges, some of which form entire islands such as Kalsoy and Kunoy. Inland, one such ridge often follows the next, interrupted by a trough valley. If the valley is below sea level, it is a fjord or sound.

In Faroese, a mountain in the interior is called fjall. Accordingly, the mountain landscape itself is also called Fjall.

== Cliffs and islets ==
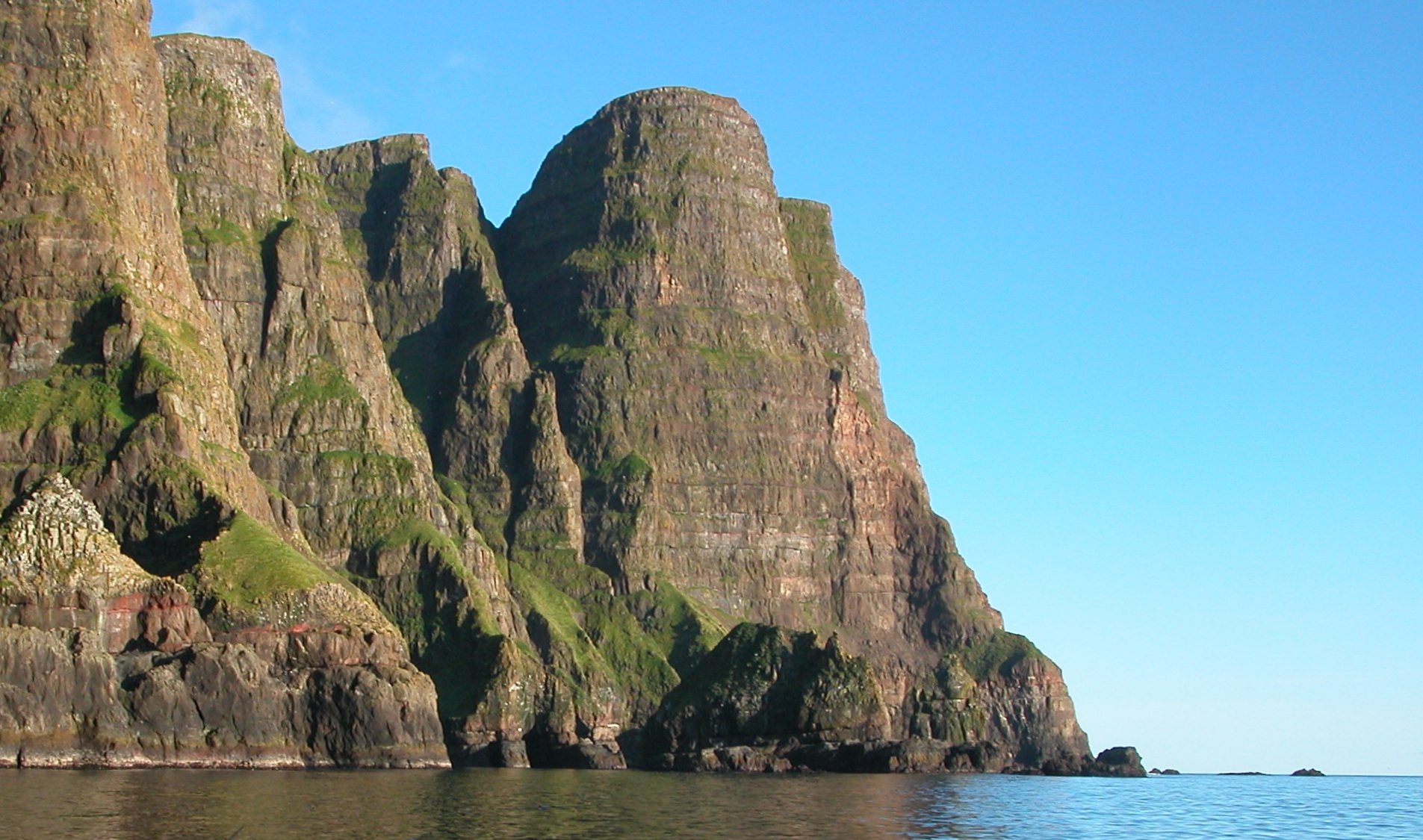
At 469 metres, Beinisvørð is by far not the highest promontory on the Faroese coast

The cliffs of the Faroe Islands are among the highest in the world. Cape Enniberg (754 metres) in the far north of the archipelago on Viðoy is often considered to be the highest sea cliff in the world, while others are more modest and call it the highest in Europe. It is important to consider what one is talking about: a steep slope or a vertical wall. Enniberg is vertical. If vertical is not the criterion, then Kunoyarnakkur ( 819 moh ) on the northern tip of Kunoy is one of the highest capes in the world. Vertical walls several hundred metres high are mostly found on the west and north coasts of the islands. They form the famous 'bird mountains' (singular and plural: fuglabjørg or fuglaberg ) as nesting sites for the Faroese seabird population . In Faroese, a distinction is made between fjall and berg . A berg is always a cliff.

This coast is still constantly exposed to surf, which can be up to 50 metres high, and to violent winter storms. There are caves everywhere in the rock that the sea has washed out. When the surf hits such a cavity, high air pressure is created, which is partly responsible for parts of the rock being blown out. As a result, the coast is not only riddled with vertical cracks, but also has free-standing cliffs right in front of it . Such a pillar is called stakkur if it is blunt, and drangur if it tapers to a point. Sheep can also graze on a large stakkur.

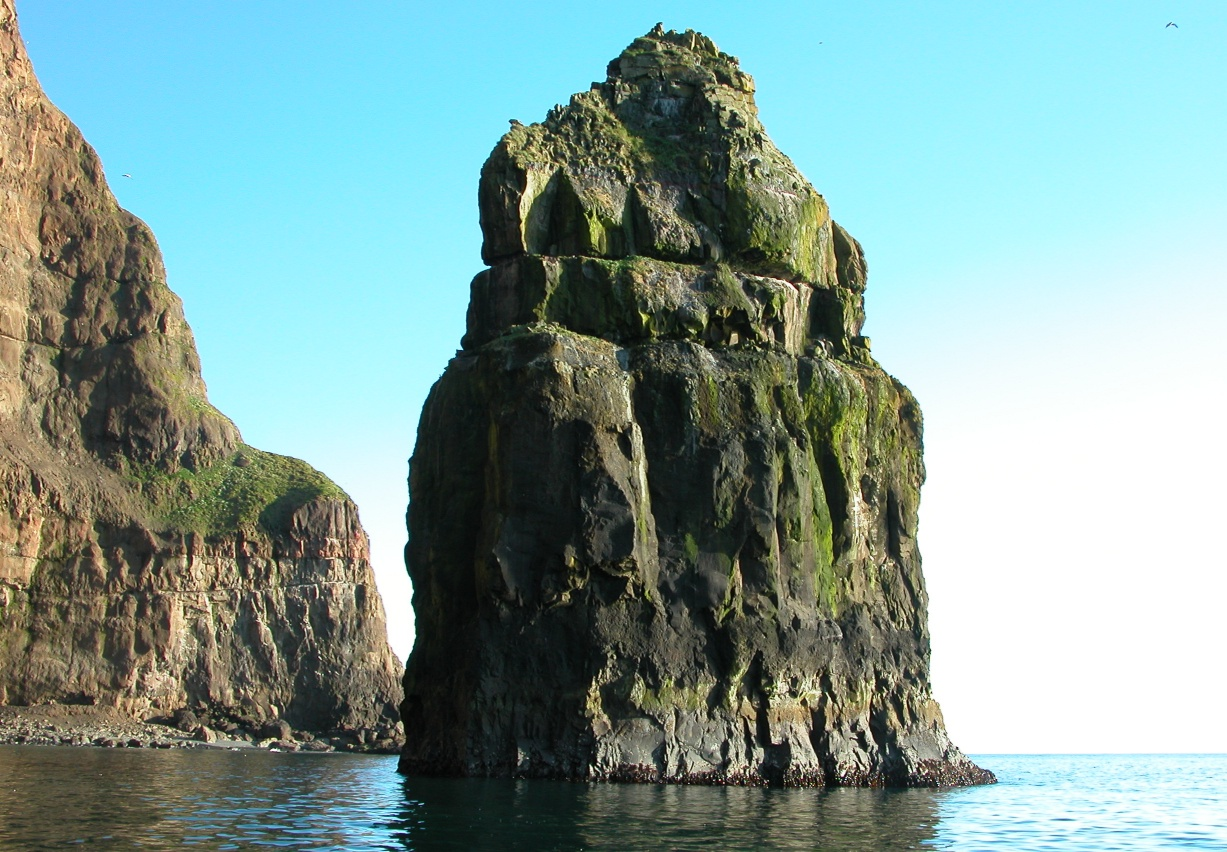
A drangur is a freestanding pillar without a flat summit.

There are also islands off the coast. A hólmur is a small island (oyggj), but it is not counted among the 18 islands of the Faroe Islands. And finally there are small, flat skerries that are not covered in grass but serve as a refuge for grey seals.
