= Sørvágsvatn =

Lake in the Faroe Islands

- Leitisvatn
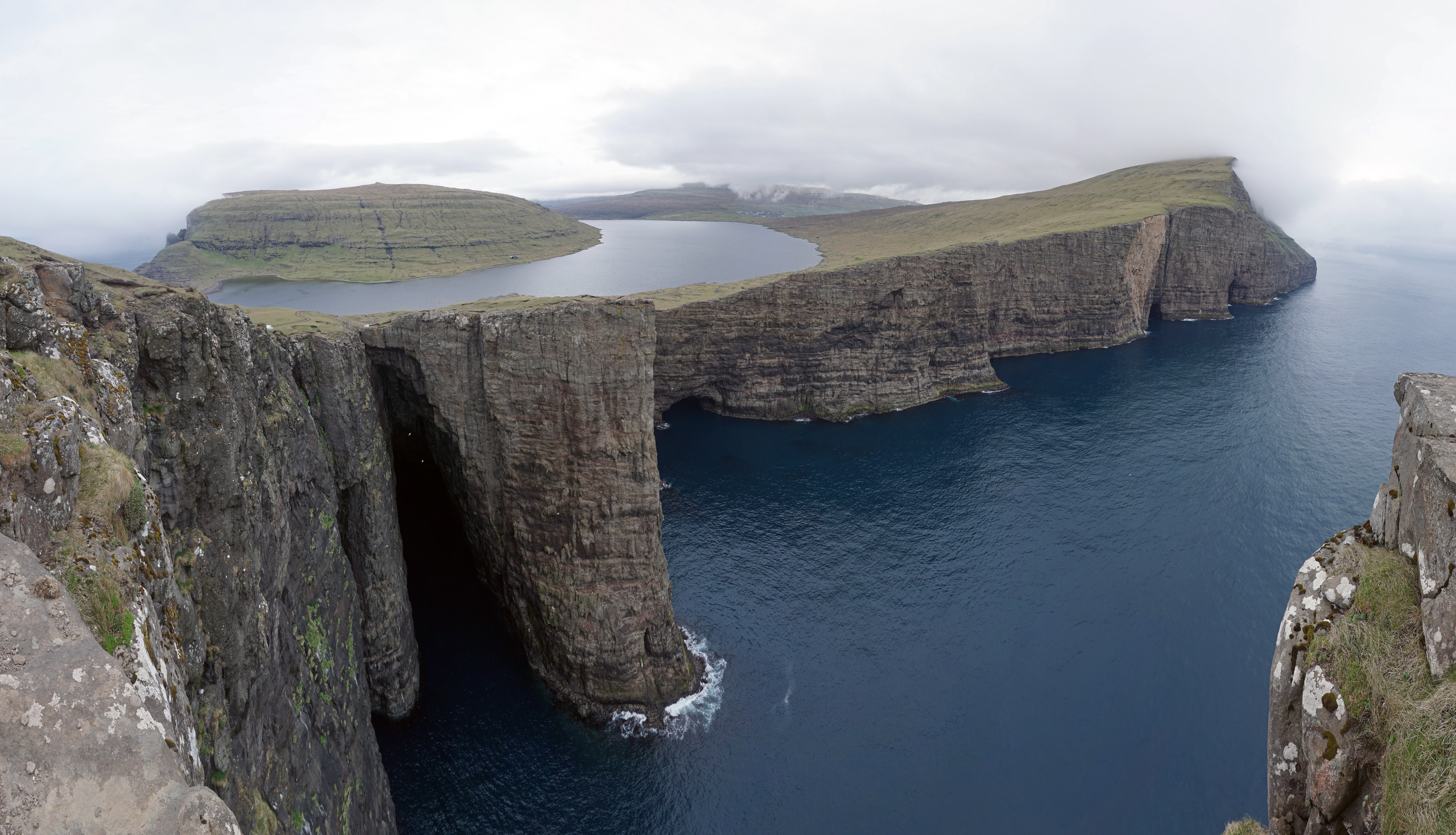
- Sørvágsvatn as seen from Trælanípan, Vágar

- Location within Denmark Faroe Islands
- Location: Vágar
- Coordinates: 62°03′N 7°14′W
- Catchment area: 35.2 km^{2} (13.6 sq mi)
- Basin countries: (Faroe Islands)
- Surface area: 3.4 km^{2} (1.3 sq mi)
- Average depth: 27.5 m (90 ft)
- Max. depth: 59 m (194 ft)
- Surface elevation: 32 m (105 ft)

Sørvágsvatn or Leitisvatn is the largest lake in the Faroe Islands. It is situated on the island of Vágar, between the municipalities of Sørvágur and Vágar. The local reference is mostly just Vatnið ("The lake"). The area is 3.4 km^{2} (1.3 sq mi), more than three times the size of Fjallavatn, the second largest lake, also located on Vágar.

== Name ==
Among the locals, there is disagreement regarding the name of the lake. The inhabitants of Sørvágur to the west prefer Sørvágsvatn, which means "the lake by Sørvágur". The inhabitants of Miðvágur and Sandavágur to the east prefer Leitisvatn, which means "the lake by Leiti", referring to the territory on the east side of it.

The village of Miðvágur is closer to the lake than Sørvágur, but the latter is considered to have been settled earlier. Sørvágur —alongside Bøur and Sandavágur—is considered one of the three original settlements on Vágar. These divided the land on the island into three equal regions of 60 marks, which would place the lake within Sørvágur's region.

The locals mostly refer to it as Vatnið ("the lake"), which is understood to refer to that body of water. The debate occurs mostly when people from other parts of the Faroes refer to the lake by one of its given names.

== Geography ==
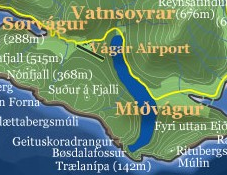
Map of the lake

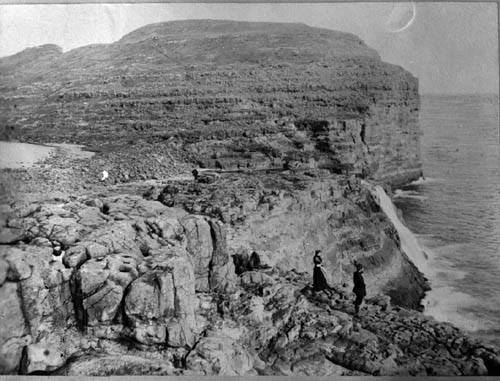
1898 or 1899 photo showing the waterfall Bøsdalafossur

The lake is located very close to the ocean, but its surface is about 32 m (105 ft) above the sea level. It is surrounded by a higher cliff which prevents it from emptying fully into the ocean, the waterfall Bøsdalafossur being the outlet. The greater height of the cliffs on either side of Bøsdalafossur can give the illusion from certain perspectives that the lake is higher above sea level than it is.

== History ==
During World War II, the British army built an airfield (now Vágar Airport) to the west of the lake. They also built a station to support seaplanes. The first aircraft to land on the lake was a Catalina from RAF Coastal Command, in 1941.

== Places and names ==
- Trælanípan (Slave Cliff)
- Oyrar
- Bøsdalafossur
- Sjatlá
- Sálarbótsá

== Tourism ==
There are opportunities for fishing brown trout on the lake. In the summer of 2005, a local initiative was set up for boat excursions on it.
