= Vatnsoyrar =

- Village
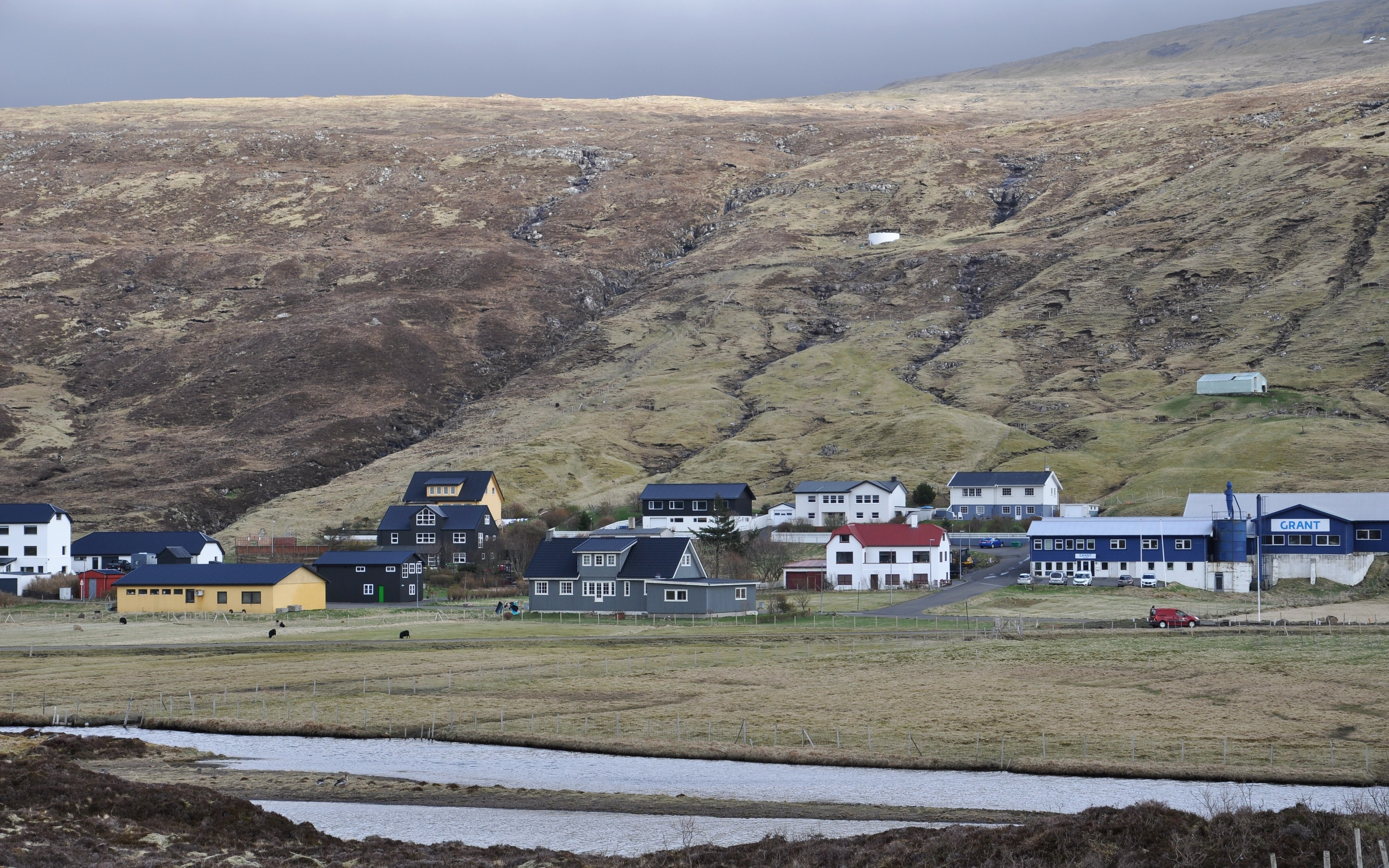
- Vatnsoyrar

- Location in the Faroe Islands
- Coordinates: 62°4′27″N 7°14′53″W
- State: Kingdom of Denmark
- Constituent country: Faroe Islands
- Island: Vágar
- Municipality: Vágar Municipality
- Founded: 1921

Population (September 2025)
  - Total: 43
- Time zone: GMT
  - Summer (DST): UTC+1 (EST)
- Postal code: FO 385
- Climate: Cfc

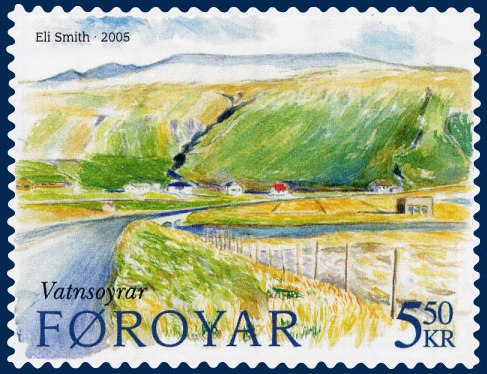
Stamp FO 512 of Postverk Føroya Issued: 7 February 2005 Artist: Eli Smith

Vatnsoyrar (Danish: Vandsøre) is a village founded in 1921 in the middle of the Faroese island of Vagar.

Vatnsoyrar, being created in 1921, is one of the youngest settlements in the Faroes. It is the only village in the archipelago that is not on the coast, but instead it is next to Sørvagsvatn, the largest lake on the Faroe Islands. Sørvagsvatn was used by the British Army as a natural airfield for seaplanes during the British occupation of the Faroes in the Second World War, while Vagar's airport was built immediately to the west of the lake.

There is a small motor museum (Vatnsoyra Bilasavn) in Vatnsoyrar with, among other things, a 1915 Model T Ford and a 1922 Ford Model TT truck, the first types of car to be used on the Faroe Islands. Beyond that there is a factory for doors and windows (Vatnsoyra Snikkaravirki).

There is a popular camp school for young people in Vatnsoyrar.

== See also ==
- List of towns in the Faroe Islands
