= Vágar Municipality =

Coordinates: 62°03′04″N 7°11′38″W

Vágar Municipality Vága kommuna (Faroese)
- Logo

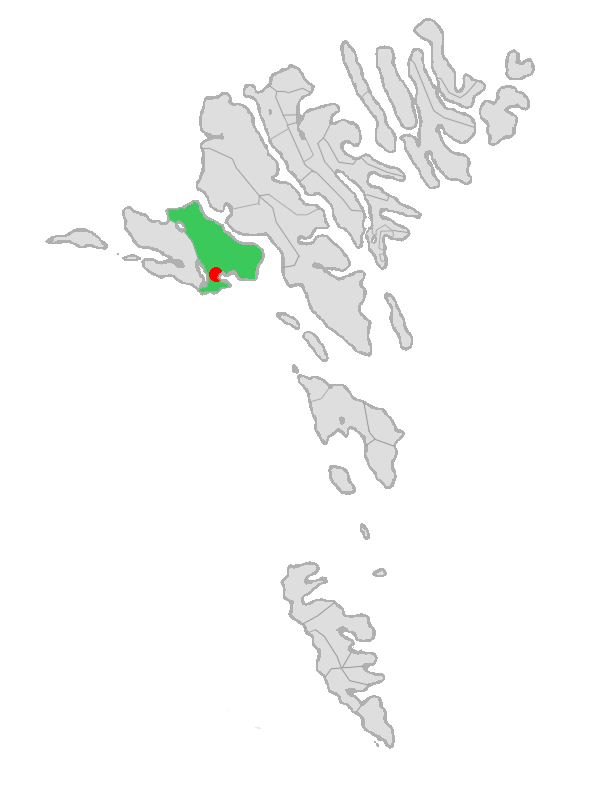
- Location of Sandavágar within Vágar Municipality in the Faroe Islands
- Administrative centre: Sandavágur

Area
  - Total: 102.8 km^{2} (39.7 sq mi)

Population (January 2024)
  - Total: 2,198
  - Density: 21.38/km^{2} (55.38/sq mi)
- Website: www.vaga.fo

Vágar Municipality (Faroese: Vága kommuna) is a municipality in the Faroese Islands.

It covers the eastern part of the island of Vágar (while Sørvágur Municipality covers the western part of the island).

It was created on 1 January 2009 by fusing the two municipalities of Miðvágur (including the towns of Miðvágur and Vatnsoyrar) and Sandavágur (including the town of Sandavágur).
