= Gásadalstunnilin =

Tunnel in the west of the Faroe Islands, on the island of Vágar

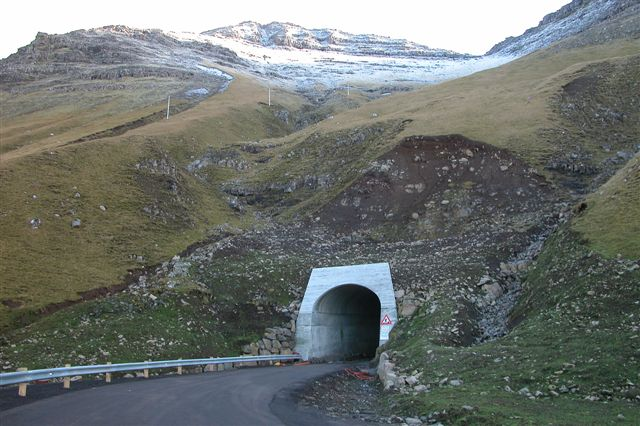
- The western entrance of the tunnel
- Interactive map of Gásadalstunnilin

Overview
- Coordinates: North West: 62.106031°N 7.428131°W; South East: 62.094444°N 7.405772°W

Technical
- Length: 1400m

The Gásadalur Tunnel, Gásadalstunnilin, is a 1.4 kilometre long, single-lane tunnel in the west of the Faroe Islands, on the island of Vágar. It connects the villages of Bøur in the east with Gásadalur in the west, which are separated by the Knúkarnir mountain.

The tunnel was initially open to pedestrians in 2003 but it was not until 2006 that it was officially open and available to vehicles.

== See also ==
- List of tunnels of the Faroe Islands
- Geographic data related to Gásadalstunnilin at OpenStreetMap
