= Árnafjall =

Mountain in the Faroe Islands

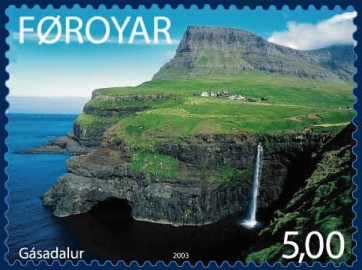

Highest point
- Elevation: 722 m (2,369 ft)
- Prominence: 772 m (2,533 ft)
- Coordinates: 62°07′52″N 7°26′10″W

Geography
- Location within Denmark Faroe Islands
- Location: Árnafjall, Faroe Islands

Árnafjall is the highest mountain on the island of Vágar in the Faroe Islands. The highest point is 722 metres (2,369 ft) above sea level. The name Árnafjall translates to the eagles mountain. The mountain lies on the west side of Vágar close to the village of Gásadalur.

There is also a mountain named Árnafjall on the island of Mykines, the highest point of which is 350 metres (1,150 ft) above sea level.
