= Sørvágsfjørður =

Fjord at Faroe Islands

Coordinates: 62°05′20″N 7°24′08″W

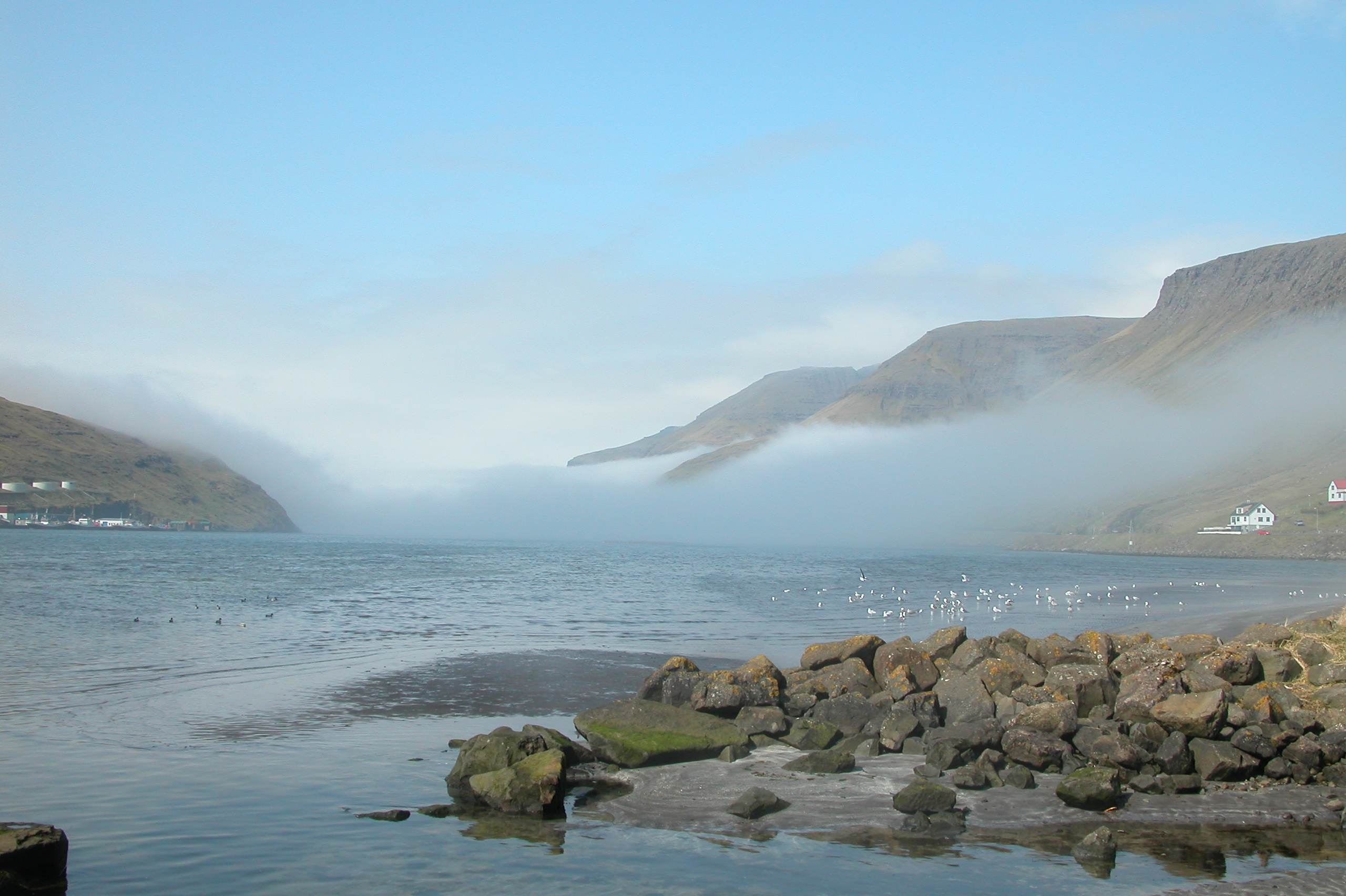
Sørvágur, Faroe Islands

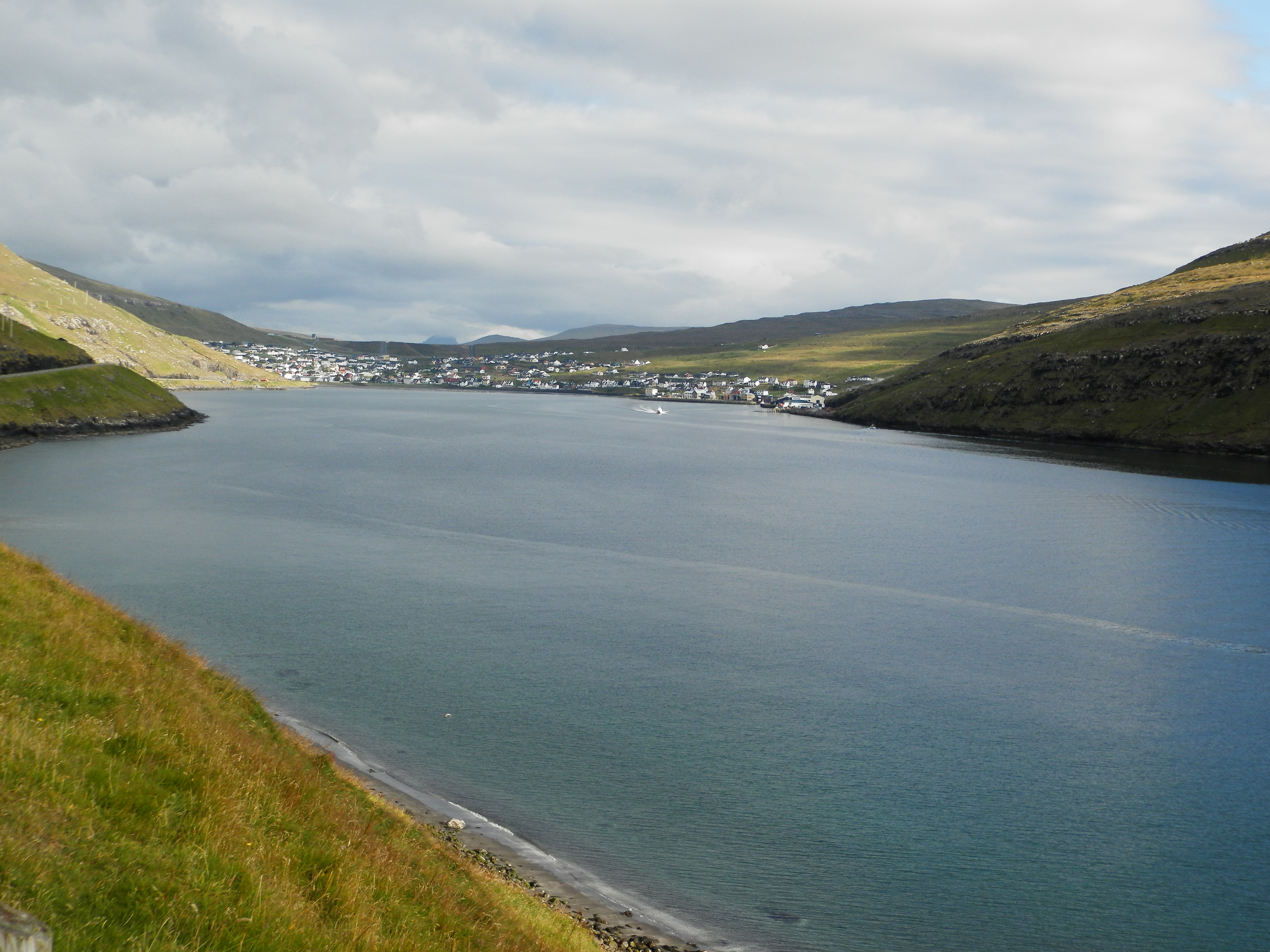
Sørvágsfjørður and Sørvágur.

Sørvágsfjørður is a fjord on the west side of the island of Vágoy in the Faroe Islands which is approximately 3.5 km (2.2 mi) long.

At the end of the fjord lies the village of Sørvágur. On the northside of the fjord lies the small village of Bøur. On the south side of the fjord lies the picturesque Tindhólmur islet, flanked by the Drangarnir sea stacks and Gáshólmur islet. Roughly in the middle of the fjord lies the uninhabited islet of Skerhólmur.

During World War II many British soldiers lived in Sørvágur. Sørvágsfjørður is mentioned in the Pioneers from the WW2 Museum, Krígssavnið, in Miðvágur. The Royal Pioneers who were in the Faroe Islands from 1941 until the end of the war published their own newspaper.
