= Eysturtindur =

Mountain in the Faroe Islands

Coordinates: 62°07′N 7°24′W

Eysturtindur is the second highest point - 714 m - on the island of Vágoy, Faroe Islands.
