= Bøur =

- Village
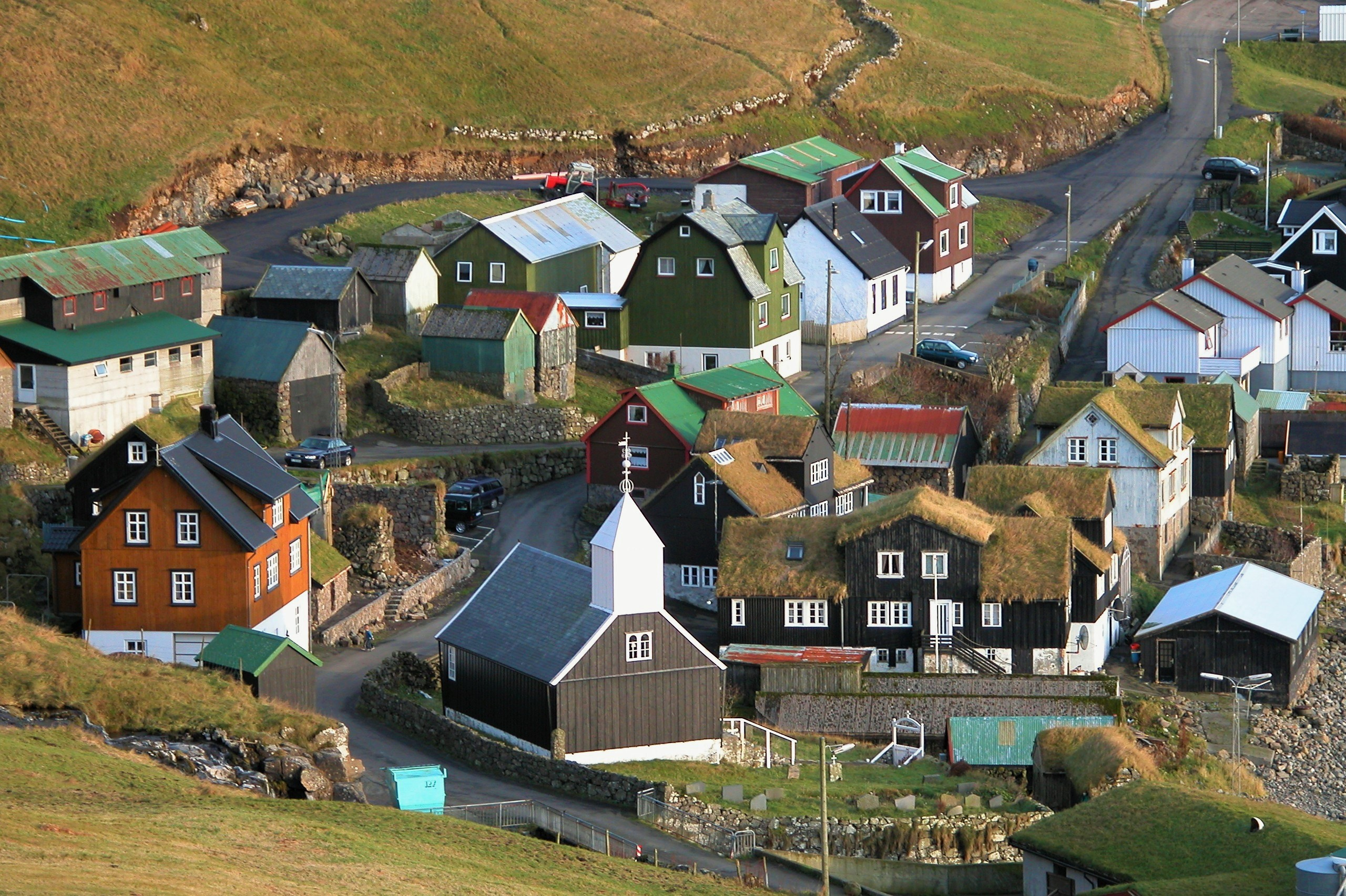
- Bøur as seen from above, Oct 2005

- Location in the Faroe Islands
- Coordinates: 62°5′27″N 7°22′3″W
- State: Kingdom of Denmark
- Country: Faroe Islands
- Island: Vágar
- Municipality: Sørvágs Kommuna

Population (September 2025)
  - Total: 68
- Time zone: GMT
  - Summer (DST): UTC+1 (EST)
- Postal code: FO 386
- Climate: Cfc

Bøur (Danish: Bø) is a village in the Sørvágur Municipality of the Faroe Islands, 4 km west of Sørvágur, with a population of 75 (2012).

Its location is 62°5′27″N 7°22′3″W and its postal code is FO 386. It is linked to the village of Gásadalur by the Gásadalstunnilin tunnel.

Bøur is a small village on the west-side of Vágar on the north side of Sørvágsfjørður, Faroe Islands. It has views over the sea and the rocky islet Tindhólmur with its many peaks, Gáshólmur and the two "drangar", (tall, pointed clifftops sticking up from the sea). This motif is known on many paintings and photographs.

The old houses in the village are bunched together with narrow lanes between them, and at the western end stands the cosy church, which was built in 1865.

Bøur is an ancient settlement and is mentioned in the so-called Dog Letter dating from 1350 AD, but it is probably older. The village is also mentioned as having a church in a document dated 1710, but it is not known when the first village church was built.

== Eiriksboði ==
The best-known story from Bøur tells of a dispute about succession to property. Two brothers, Simun and Eirikur, owned all the village property jointly, but Eirikur was keen to have it divided. In the end Eirikur killed his brother, and then travelled over to Kirkjubøur to beg the bishop for mercy. The bishop was inclined to grant him absolution if he paid a large penalty to the bishop and to the church. Eirikur agreed, and the contract was carved out on a wooden beam.

Eirikur sailed back to Bøur, but when he reached the still waters and thought he was out of danger, a great wave rose up, the boat capsized, and he was drowned. The hidden reef has been known ever since as Eiriksboði in memory of the event, and is situated on the inner side of Tindhólmur.

== To Steal Fire ==
The village land consists of eighteen fields of enclosed and open land, most of it being owned by the king (and is now national property). Another old story tells how ownership passed to the king. The settlement was very tiny at the time, perhaps only a single household, and one day the fire in the hearth went out. This meant an ignominious journey to the next settlement to ask for fire, and a young girl was sent off to Sørvágur. She was lucky and found nobody at home, so she took some burning wood from the fire and hurried back home. Unfortunately the smoke from the fire had been seen, and the farmer from Sørvágur accused her of stealing the fire. As a penalty, most of Bøur became royal estate property.

== Gallery ==
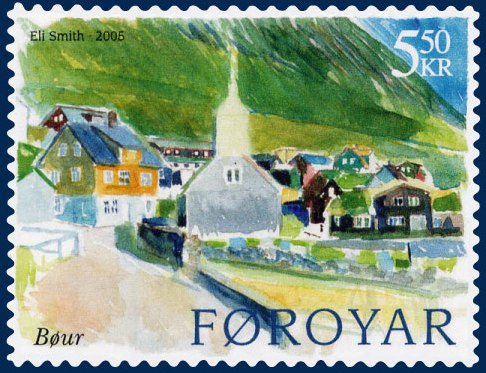
FO 507 of Postverk Føroya
Issued: 7 February 2005
Artist: Eli Smith

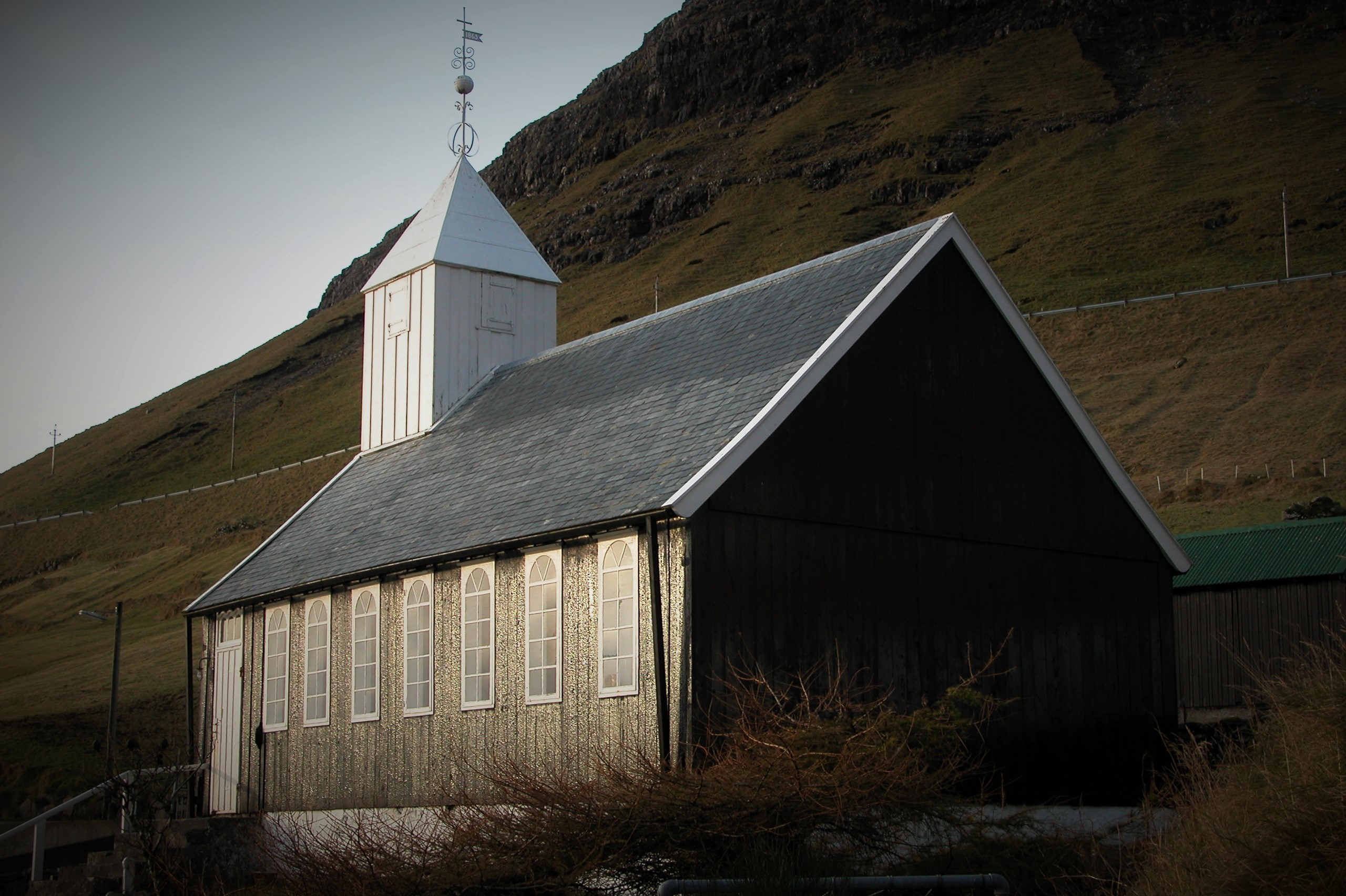
Bøur Kirkja

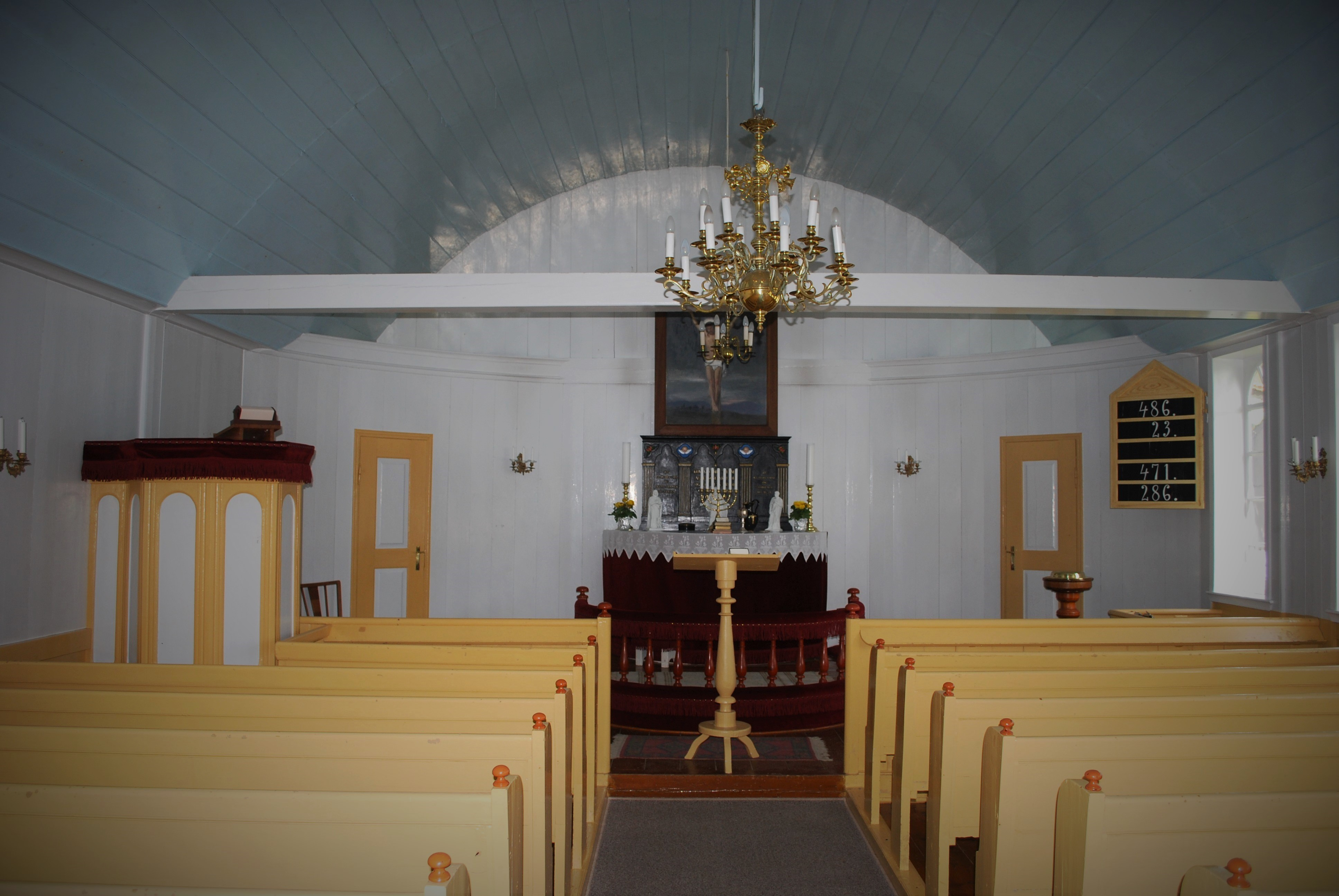
Bøur Kirkja

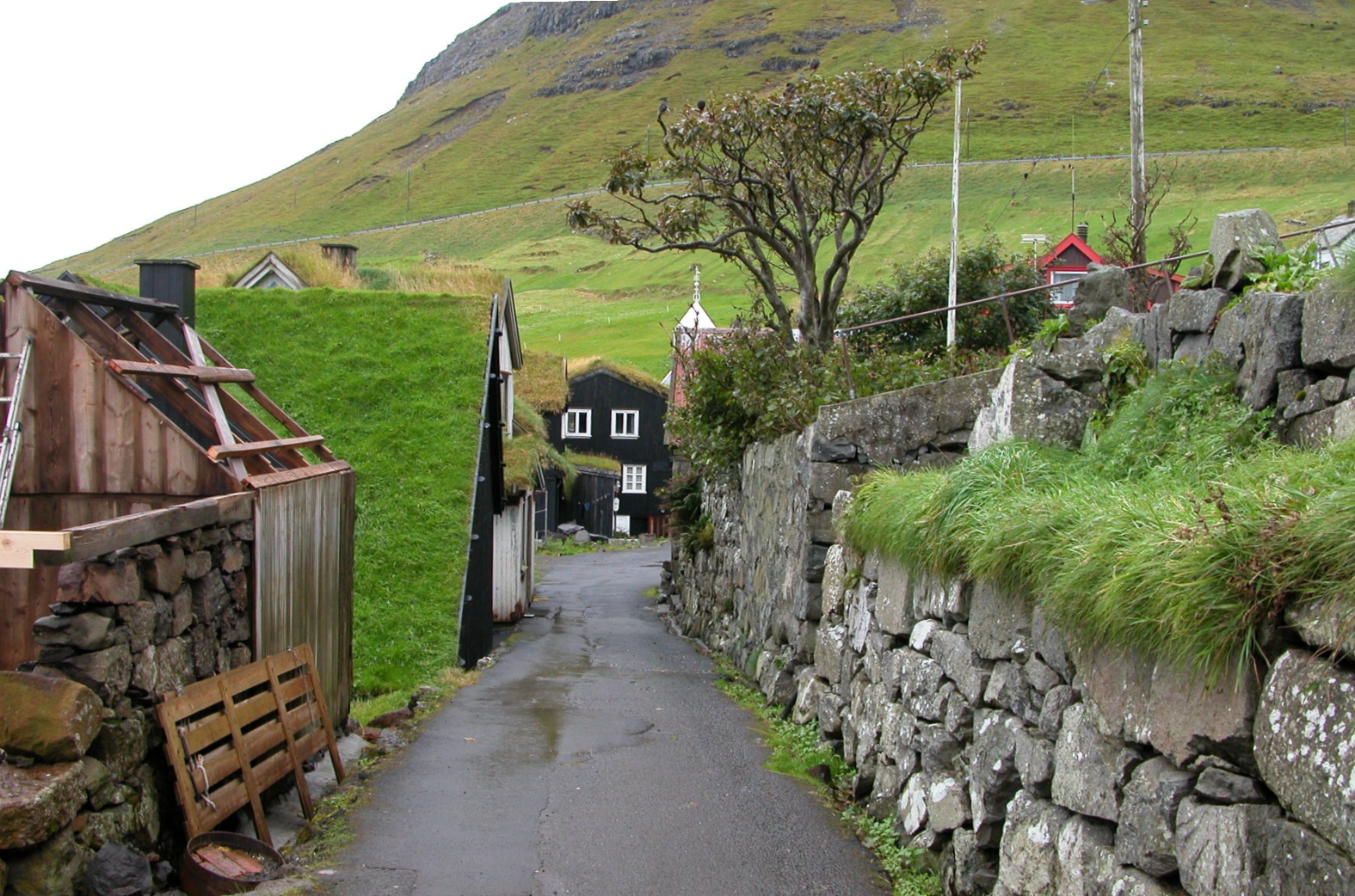
Village idyll in Bøur

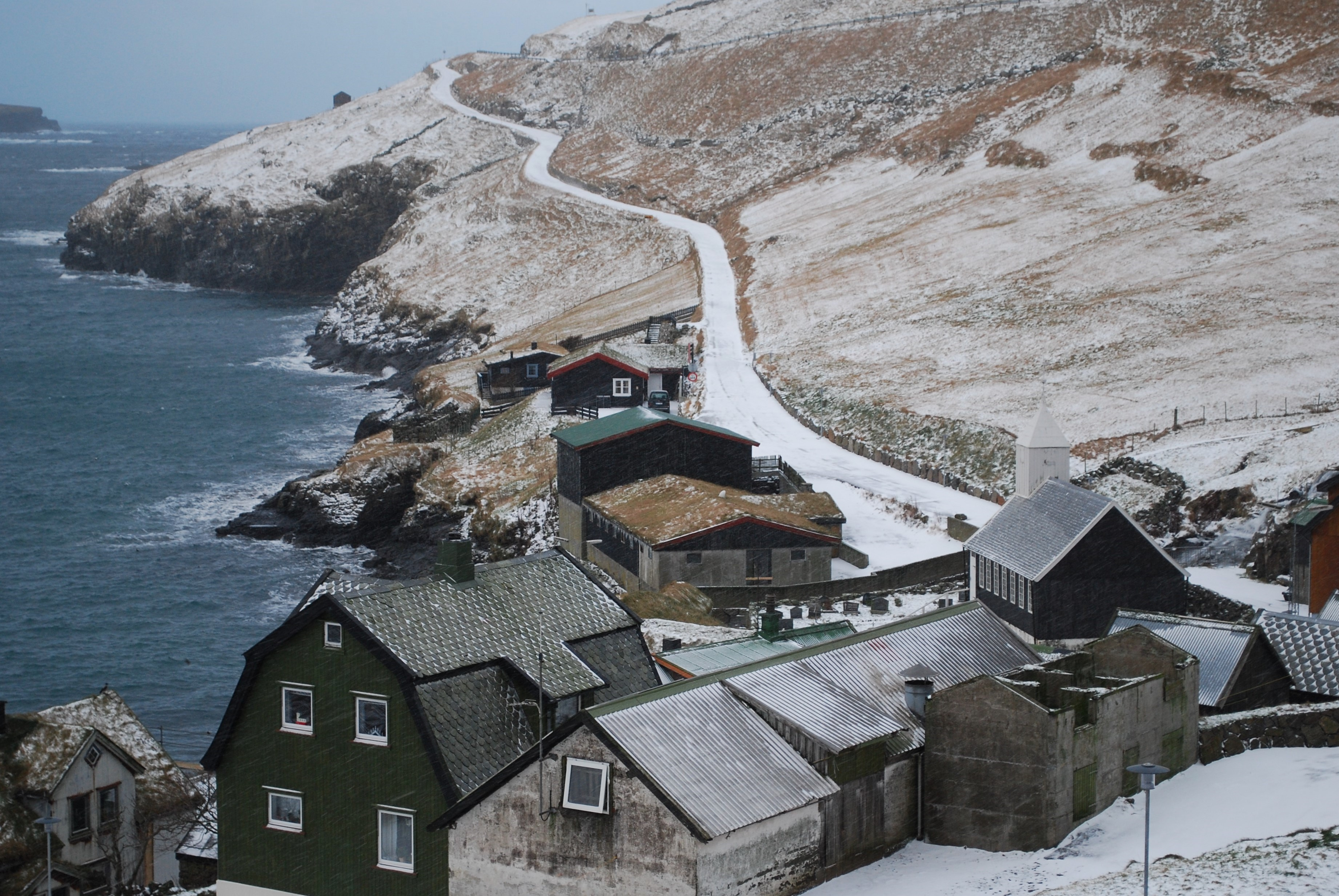
Bøur

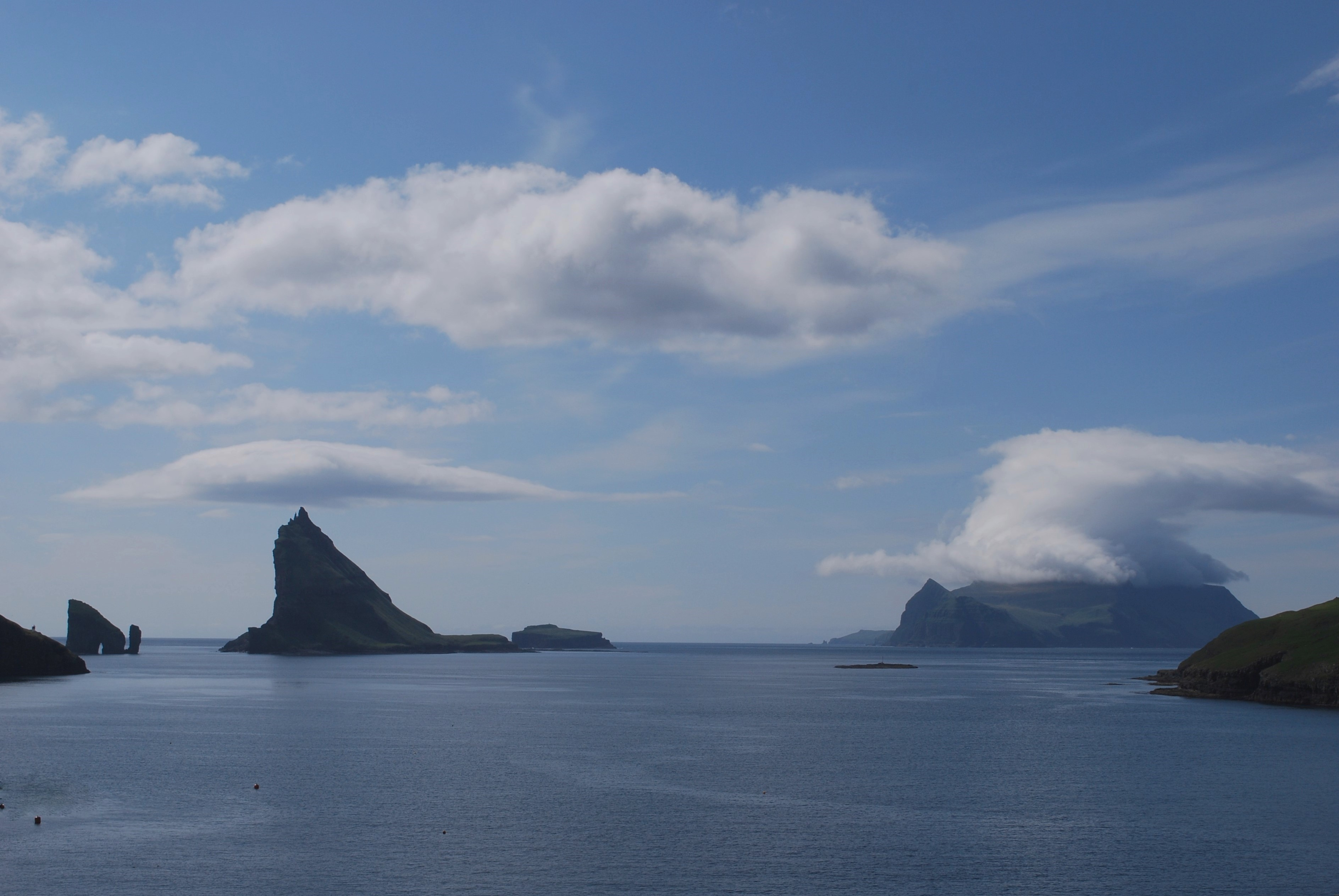
Seen from Bøur

== See also ==
- List of towns in the Faroe Islands
