= Fjallavatn =

Lake in the Faroe Islands

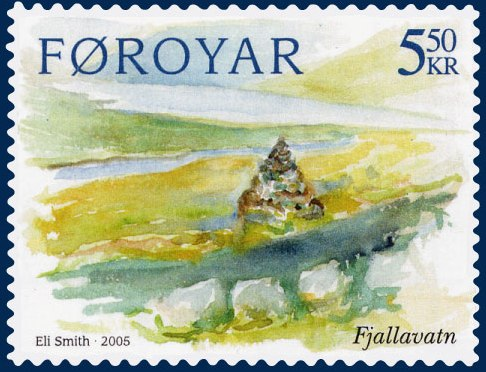
- Stamp FO 513 of Postverk Føroya; Issued: 7 February 2005; Artist: Eli Smith

- Location within Denmark Faroe Islands
- Location: Vágar
- Coordinates: 62°07′21″N 7°17′57″W
- Basin countries: Faroe Islands
- Surface area: 1.02 km^{2} (0.39 sq mi)

Fjallavatn is the second largest lake in the Faroe Islands. It is situated on the island of Vágar and its size is 1 km^{2}.
