= Vágar =

Vágar Vågø
- Island
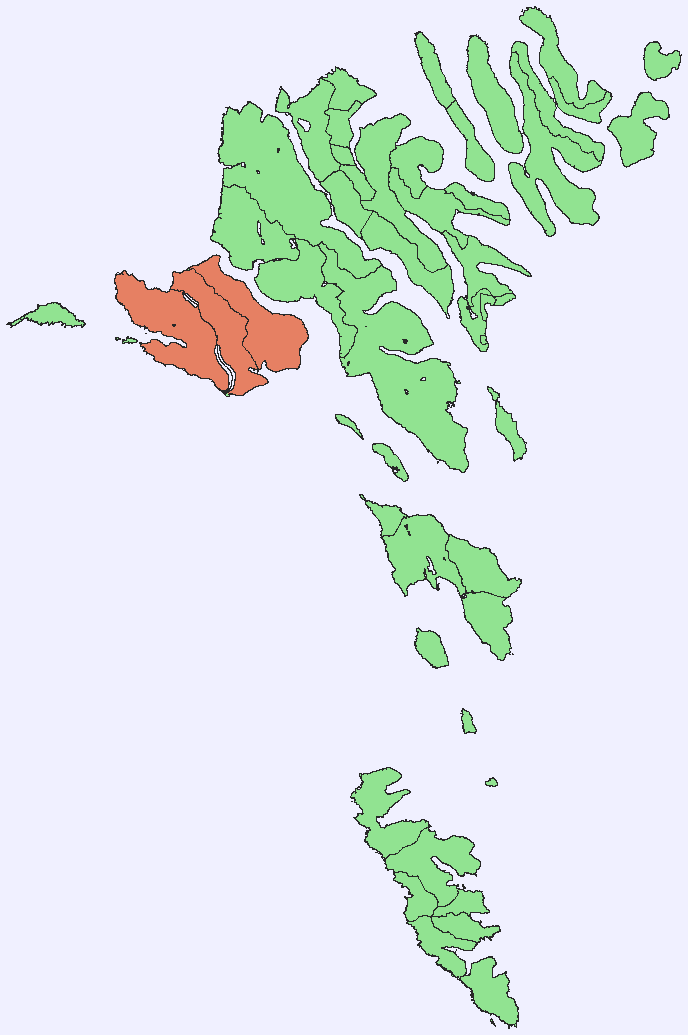
- Location within the Faroe Islands
- Coordinates: 62°05′N 7°16′W
- State: Kingdom of Denmark
- Constituent country: Faroe Islands
- Region: Vágar

Area
  - Total: 176 km^{2} (68 sq mi)
  - Rank: 3
- Highest elevation: 722 m (2,369 ft)

Population (01-2020)
  - Total: 3,367
  - Density: 19.1/km^{2} (49.5/sq mi)
- Time zone: UTC+0 (GMT)
  - Summer (DST): UTC+1 (EST)
- Calling code: 298

Vágar (Faroese pronunciation: [vɔːaɹ]; Danish: Vågø) is one of the 18 islands in the archipelago of the Faroe Islands and the most westerly of the large islands. With a size of 178 square kilometres (69 square miles), it ranks third in size, behind Streymoy and Eysturoy. Vágar region also comprises the island of Mykines.

The Vágar island shape is very distinctive, since on maps it resembles a dog's head. The fjord Sørvágsfjørður is the mouth and the lake Fjallavatn is the eye.

== History ==
Vágar is the first port of call for most foreigners travelling to the Faroe Islands, as it is home to the islands’ only airport, Vágar Airport. An airfield was built there during World War II by the British, who occupied the Faroe Islands with the islanders' consent. After the war it lay unused for about 20 years, but was then put back into service and expanded/modernised as required. It handles about 290,000 passengers a year (2016). Such large numbers by Faroese standards put a considerable strain on transport facilities, with the result that a road tunnel (Vágatunnilin) measuring 5 km (3 mi) in length and running under the sea now connects Vágar with the two largest islands in the Faroes and thus the capital Tórshavn.

== Tourism ==
The country's two largest lakes - Sørvágsvatn and Fjallavatn - are to be found there, and the tourist association organises excursions throughout the summer.

== Villages ==
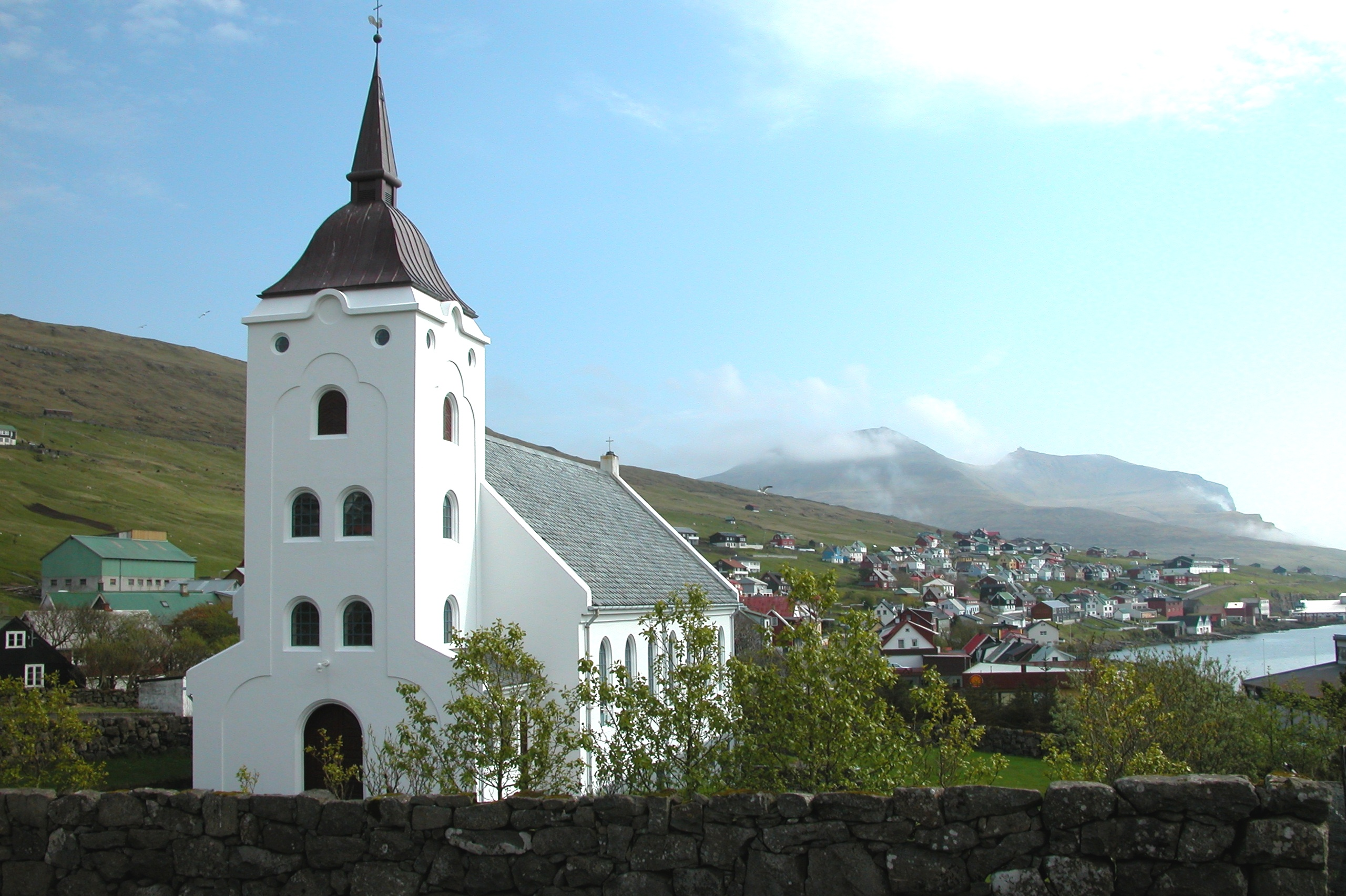
Miðvágur in 2004

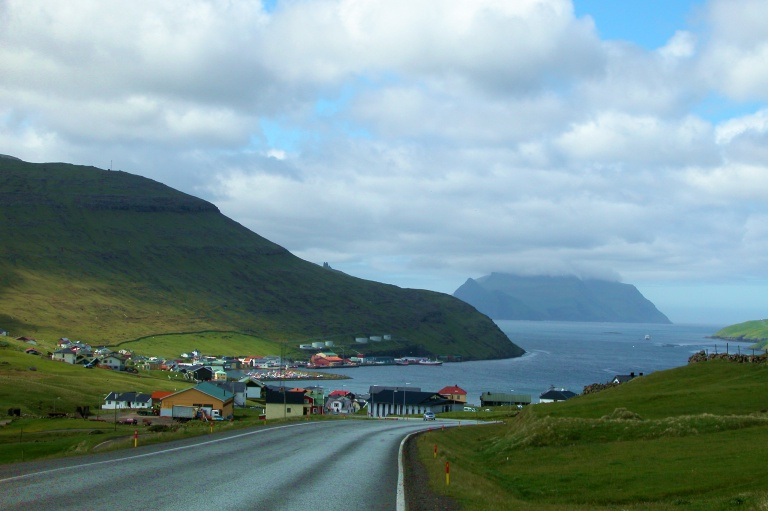
Sørvágur and the island of Mykines in the background.

Vágar has three large villages: Miðvágur, Sandavágur and Sørvágur and three small ones: Gásadalur, Bøur and Vatnsoyrar. Earlier there were two more villages: Slættanes, which was abandoned in 1965 and Víkar, which was abandoned in 1910.

The largest is Miðvágur, which has 1,130 inhabitants (01–2020). It is in the middle of the island and so has naturally become a centre, with a doctor's surgery, co-op and vicarage. It is also a historic village and was home to Beinta Broberg, a clergyman's wife who was dubbed “Wicked Beinta”. The story of her life was told in the famous novel Barbara by Jørgen-Frantz Jacobsen, which was filmed in 1997 by Niels Malmros. The farmhouse Kálvalíð to the north is the oldest house in the village and possibly in the Faroe Islands too. It is now the village museum.

To the east of Miðvágur lies Sandavágur, which has a population of 958 (01–2020). It too is a historic village. It was home to the law speaker of the Faroe Islands until 1816, when the office was abolished and the islands became a Danish administrative district. The clergyman V. U. Hammershaimb, who was born in Sandavágur in 1819 and became the father of the Faroese written language, was the son of the last law speaker. The Sandavágur stone with a runic inscription dating back to around 1200 was found there in 1917 and can now be seen in the Sandavágur church.

The third large village is Sørvágur, which is on the western side of the island near the airport and has 1,136 inhabitants (01–2020). During World War II, when the airfield was being built in 1942–1944, 5,000 British soldiers lived in Sørvágur, but now few traces remain of their camp to the south of the village. Tindhólmur, Gáshólmur and the two “drangar” (freestanding cliffs) belong to the village. The view out to them is among the most beautiful in the Faroe Islands.

Vágar has two other old villages: Bøur, which lies 4 kilometres (2 miles) west of Sørvágur and has 74 inhabitants (01–2020), and Gásadalur, which lies further west on the Mykinesfjørður strait and has 16 inhabitants (01–2020). Many people have moved away from this village, but it now has a road link in the form of a Gásadalstunnilin through the mountain and it is hoped that the village will start to grow again.

A new village, Vatnsoyrar, which has 44 inhabitants (01–2020), appeared on Vágar in 1921. It was founded by three men, each of whom was given a plot of land to farm and set up home there with his family. The village is in the upland pastures belonging to Miðvágur and so forms part of Miðvágur District. When the British occupied the Faroe Islands and built the airfield on Vágar, Vatnsoyrar was their headquarters. The local population was evacuated, but was able to return home when the war ended.

At the northernmost point of the island, in the upland pastures belonging to Sandavágur, lay the village of Slættanes, which was founded in 1835. It grew for a time and at its largest was home to around 70 people. It also had a school, which can be seen on a stamp. The last residents left in 1964.

Another new village, Víkar, was founded in the upland pastures belonging to Gásadalur on the north side of the island in 1833. The area was good for farming, but the settlement was very isolated, and getting to the next village was a difficult business. The last few inhabitants moved away in 1910.

The beaches at Bøur, Miðvágur and Sandavágur are recognised as official grind beaches.

== Geography ==
=== Climate ===
Vagar has a cold, temperate oceanic climate (Köppen: Cfc), bordering on a tundra climate (ET). It has chilly winters, cool summers and is wet year-round. Snow can fall in trace quantities from November to April.

Climate data for Vágar Airport, Vágar, 84 m.a.s.l.
Month	Jan	Feb	Mar	Apr	May	Jun	Jul	Aug	Sep	Oct	Nov	Dec	Year
Record high °C (°F)	10.3 (50.5)	9.5 (49.1)	12.5 (54.5)	14.8 (58.6)	20.8 (69.4)	21.6 (70.9)	24.0 (75.2)	23.5 (74.3)	20.5 (68.9)	14.0 (57.2)	12.0 (53.6)	12.2 (54.0)	24.0 (75.2)
Mean daily maximum °C (°F)	4.8 (40.6)	4.8 (40.6)	5.2 (41.4)	6.4 (43.5)	8.8 (47.8)	10.8 (51.4)	12.1 (53.8)	12.3 (54.1)	10.4 (50.7)	8.6 (47.5)	6.1 (43.0)	5.3 (41.5)	8.0 (46.4)
Daily mean °C (°F)	2.7 (36.9)	2.7 (36.9)	3.1 (37.6)	4.3 (39.7)	6.6 (43.9)	8.7 (47.7)	10.2 (50.4)	10.4 (50.7)	8.6 (47.5)	6.8 (44.2)	4.2 (39.6)	3.3 (37.9)	6.0 (42.8)
Mean daily minimum °C (°F)	0.5 (32.9)	0.6 (33.1)	0.9 (33.6)	2.1 (35.8)	4.4 (39.9)	6.6 (43.9)	8.3 (46.9)	8.5 (47.3)	6.7 (44.1)	4.8 (40.6)	2.1 (35.8)	1.1 (34.0)	3.9 (39.0)
Record low °C (°F)	−10.0 (14.0)	−11.7 (10.9)	−10.6 (12.9)	−9.9 (14.2)	−5.0 (23.0)	−0.3 (31.5)	1.4 (34.5)	1.0 (33.8)	−2.5 (27.5)	−6.4 (20.5)	−10.0 (14.0)	−10.9 (12.4)	−11.7 (10.9)
Average precipitation mm (inches)	163 (6.4)	122 (4.8)	141 (5.6)	120 (4.7)	83 (3.3)	81 (3.2)	115 (4.5)	133 (5.2)	151 (5.9)	164 (6.5)	140 (5.5)	142 (5.6)	1,555 (61.2)
Average precipitation days (≥ 1.0 mm)	23	19	21	18	13	11	15	18	19	20	18	20	215
Source: Danish Meteorological Institute

=== Important Bird Area ===
The north-west, west and south-west coasts of the island have been identified as an Important Bird Area by BirdLife International because of their significance as breeding sites for seabirds, especially northern fulmars (100,000 pairs), European storm petrels (5000 pairs), European shags (500 pairs), great skuas (20 pairs), black-legged kittiwakes (8400 pairs), Atlantic puffins (40,000 pairs), common guillemots (2700 individuals) and black guillemots (400 pairs).

=== Mountains ===
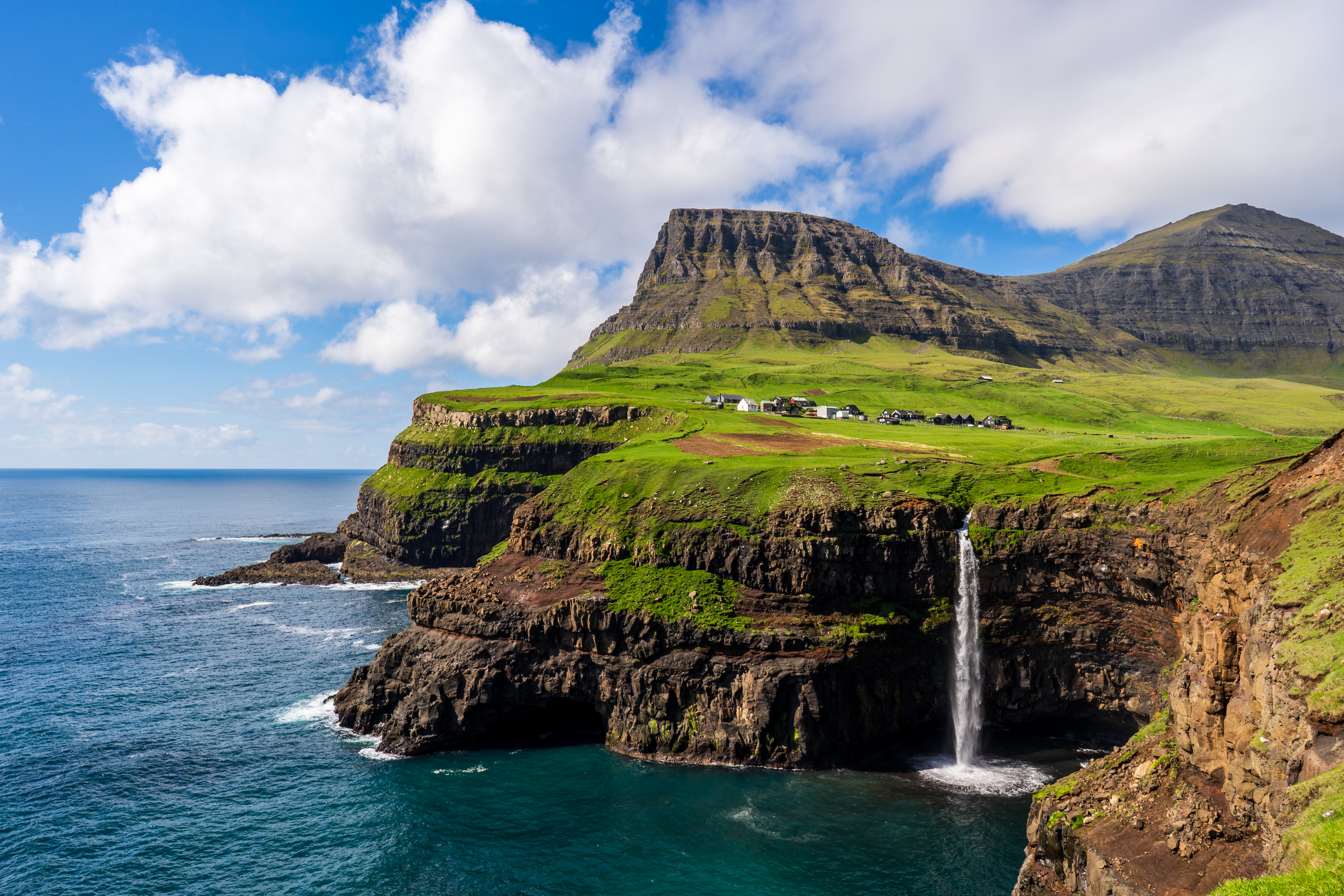
Árnafjall mountain, with the village of Gásadalur in 2021.

There are 41 mountains on Vágar, the major ones are:

Name	Height
Árnafjall	722 m
Eysturtindur	715 m
Malinstindur	683

=== Major lakes ===
Name	Area
Sørvágsvatn	3.4 km^{2}
Fjallavatn	1.02 km^{2}
Vatnsdalsvatn	
Kvilkinnavatn	

=== Major waterfalls ===
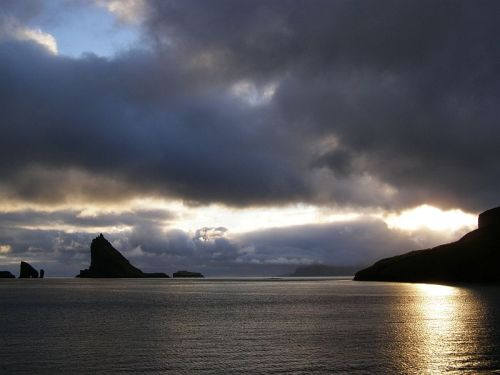
Drangarnir, Tindhólmur and Gáshólmur

- Bøsdalafossur
- Múlafossur
- Reipsáfossur

=== Islets and rocks in the sea ===
- Tindhólmur
- Gáshólmur
- Skerhólmur
- Trøllkonufingur
- Dunnesdrangar
- Filpusardrangur
- Drangarnir - Lítli Drangur, Stóri Drangur

== Geology ==
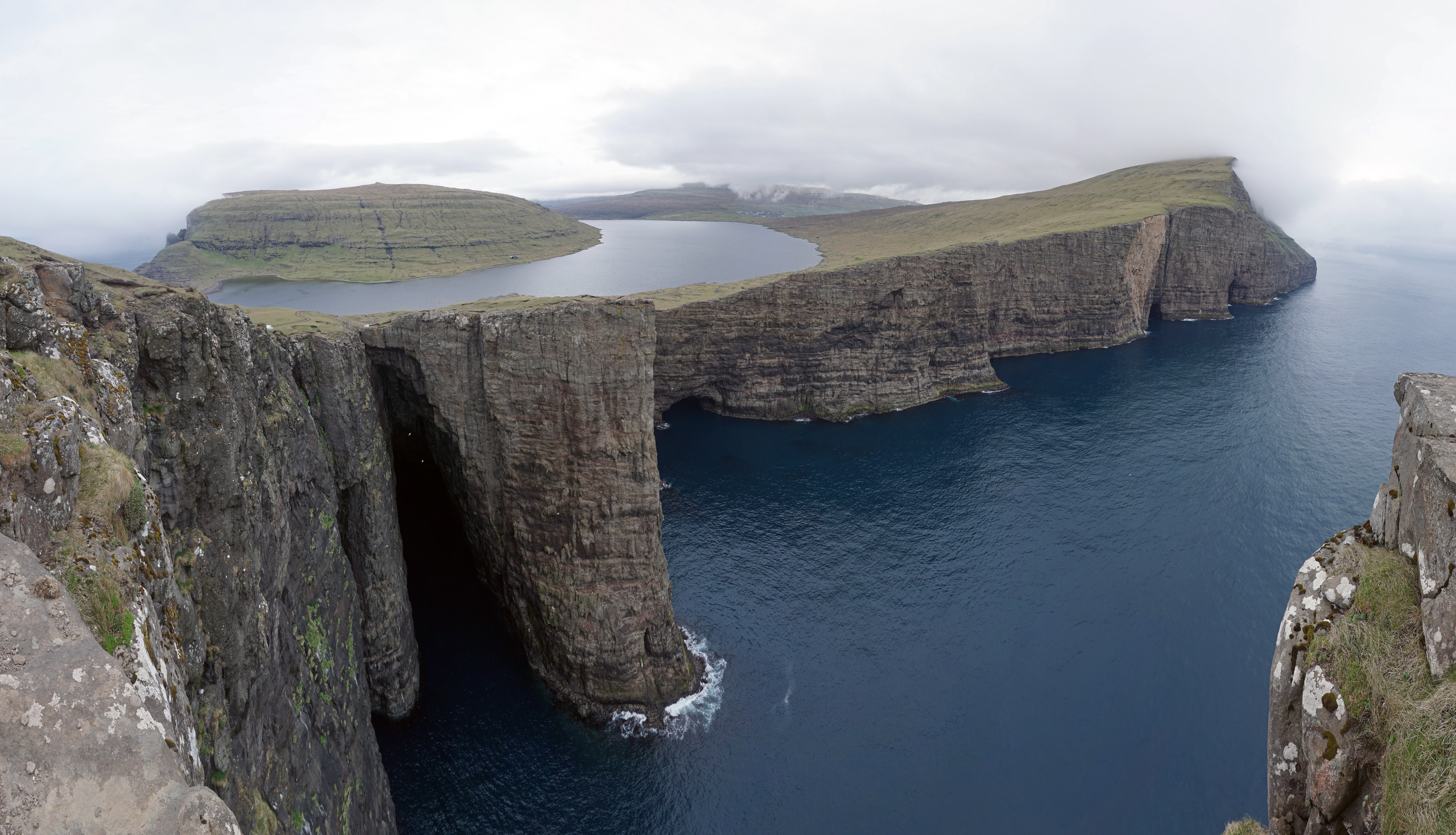
These Vágar sea cliffs show the volcanic stratigraphy typical of the Faroe Islands

Vágar Island, like the rest of the Faroe Islands, is primarily composed of Paleocene-Eocene basalt lava flows, dating back 54-58 million years. These lavas were formed during the opening of the North Atlantic Ocean and are part of the North Atlantic Igneous Province. The island's geology features alternating layers of basalt and volcanic clay and sandstone, with the basalt layers representing volcanic eruptions and the sediment layers forming during pauses in volcanic activity. Glaciers during the ice ages further shaped the island's landscape, carving out valleys and fjords.

See Geology of the Faroe Islands for an outline and references.
