= Tindhólmur =

Uninhabited islet of the Faroe Islands

- Islet
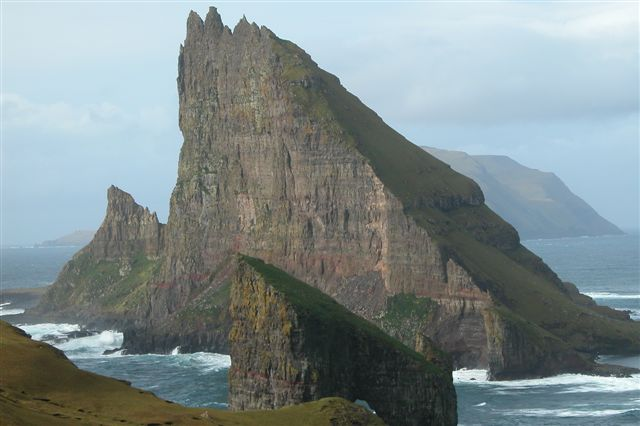
- Tindhólmur as seen from the southeast, with Drangarnir visible in front of it (2005)
- Interactive map of Tindhólmur
- Coordinates: 62°04′39″N 7°25′57″W
- Location: Southside of Sørvágsfjørður, west of Vágar of the Faroe Islands

Area
  - Total: 65 ha (160 acres)
- Highest elevation: 262 m (860 ft)

Tindhólmur is an uninhabited islet on the southside of Sørvágsfjørður and to the west of Vágar, one of the Faroe Islands of Denmark. It is known for its spiky top which has five peaks, the tallest of which is Ytsti (lit. 'Farthest') at an elevation of 262 metres (860 ft). The islet is privately owned and has an area of 65 hectares (160 acres).

== Geography ==
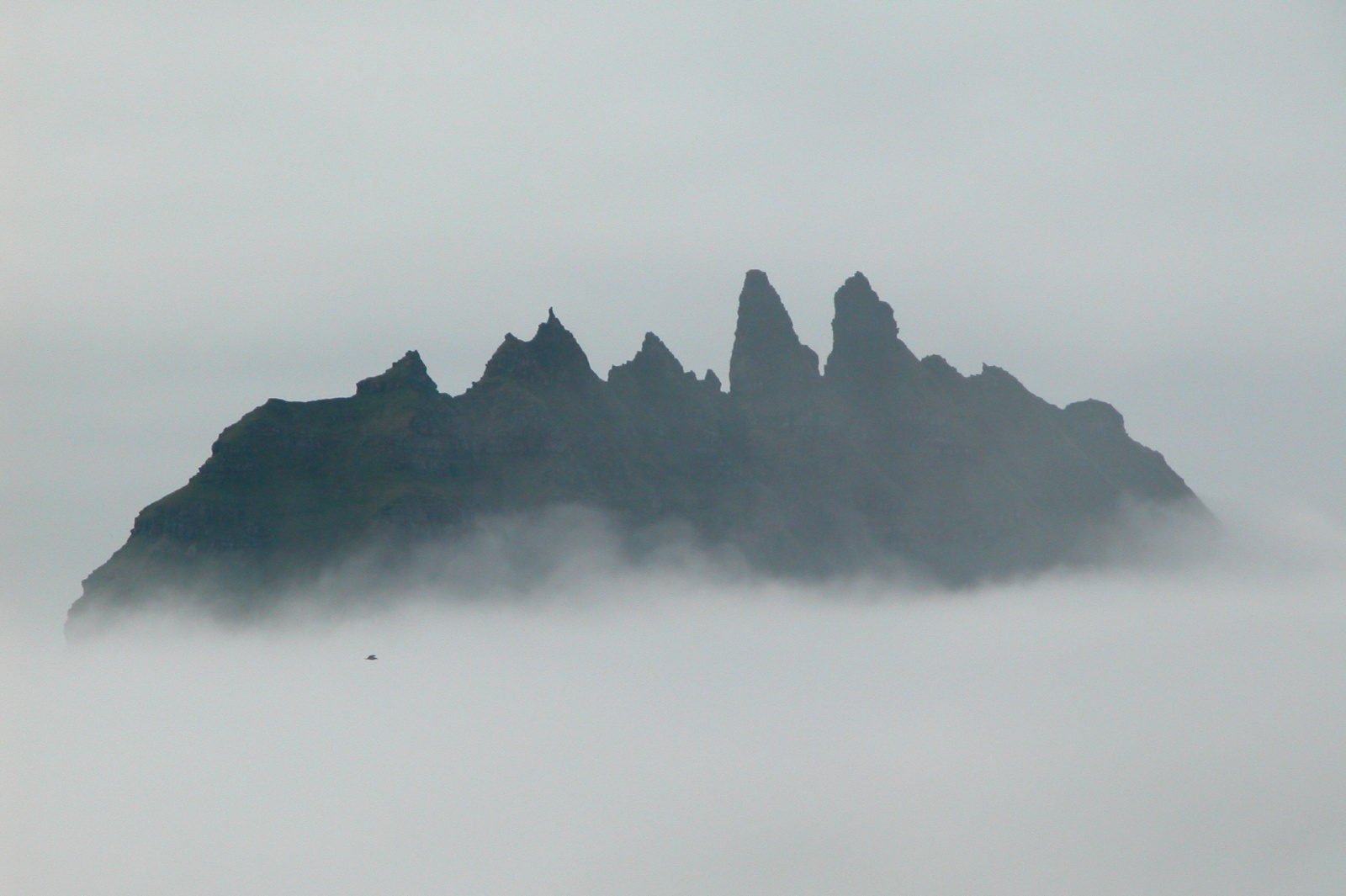
The five peaks of Tindhólmur

Tindhólmur is located in the Faroe Islands, an archipelago and autonomous territory of Denmark. It is situated west of the island Vágar, on the southside of Sørvágsfjørður. It has a total area of 65 hectares (160 acres), or two merkur in traditional Faroese measurements. It has five peaks, each with its own name: Ytsti, Arni (Ørnatindur), Lítli, Breiði, and Bogni (lit. 'Farthest, Eagle (Eagle Peak), Small, Broad, and Bent'). Its highest point is Ytsti at an elevation of 262 metres (860 ft).

== Legend ==
A local legend explains why Tindhólmur is uninhabited. A farmer from Sørvágur named Rasmus lived on the island long ago. His neighbours in Sørvágur, with whom he frequently clashed, sold their land on Tindhólmur to Rasmus to entice him to move there and out of the village. Rasmus lived well on Tindhólmur with many sheep, a large pasture, and plentiful birds and fish to hunt. However, one day a large eagle abducted Rasmus' two-year-old child and flew it to the islet's highest peak at the time, which would later come to be known as Arni (lit. 'Eagle') or Ørnatindur (lit. 'Eagle Peak'). Rasmus' wife rushed to climb the peak but was too late to stop the eagle from devouring the eyes of her child. Rasmus and his family subsequently left Tindhólmur and it has been uninhabited ever since. A surviving residence and boathouse on the islet supposedly belonged to Rasmus.

== Fauna ==
Tindhólmur was formerly a nesting place for the white-tailed eagle.

== Tourism ==
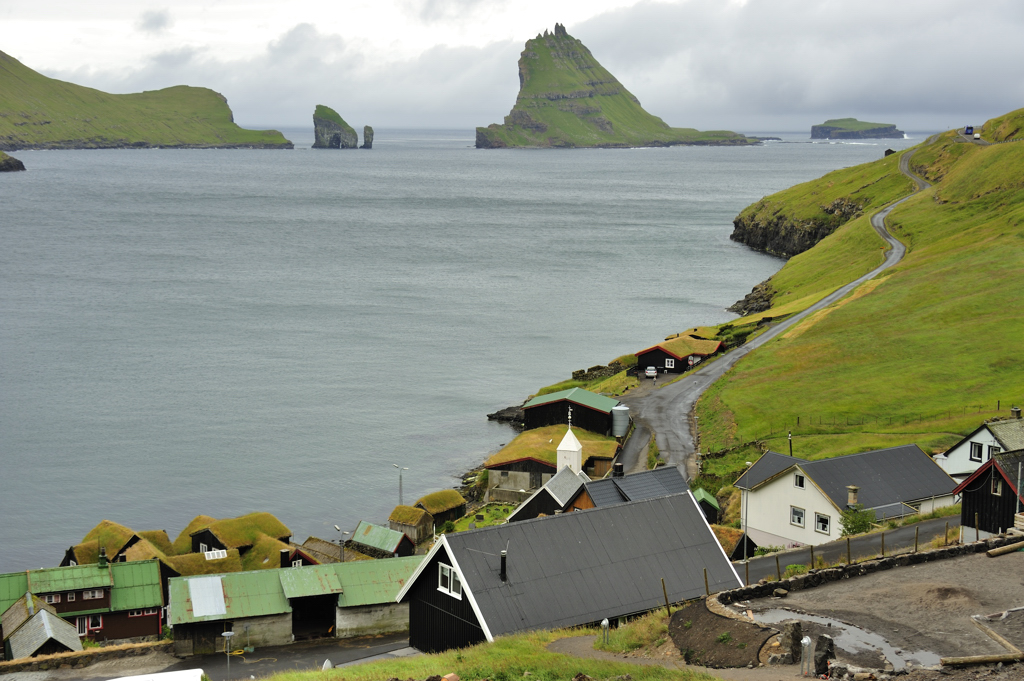
Tindhólmur as seen from Bøur

Tindhólmur is a popular tourist attraction and is only accessible by boat. Visitors can reach Tindhólmur by departing from the marina of Sørvágur, a village near Vágar Airport, the Faroe Islands' only airport. However, because the islet is privately owned, visitors must be accompanied by a guide with permission from the landowners. A number of local businesses offer boat tours to Tindhólmur. Tindhólmur is also visible from a distance at the village of Bøur and on the road to Skarðsáfossur Waterfall.

== In popular culture ==
The fictional Isle of Berk, the main setting of the 2010 animated fantasy film How to Train Your Dragon, was based on Tindhólmur. In the 2025 live-action remake, Tindhólmur is depicted as the Isle of Berk. The nearby sea stacks of Drangarnir were also featured in the films' flight scenes.
