= Gáshólmur =

Islet on the southside of Sørvágsfjørður in the Faroe Islands

Coordinates: 62.0800°N 7.4612°W

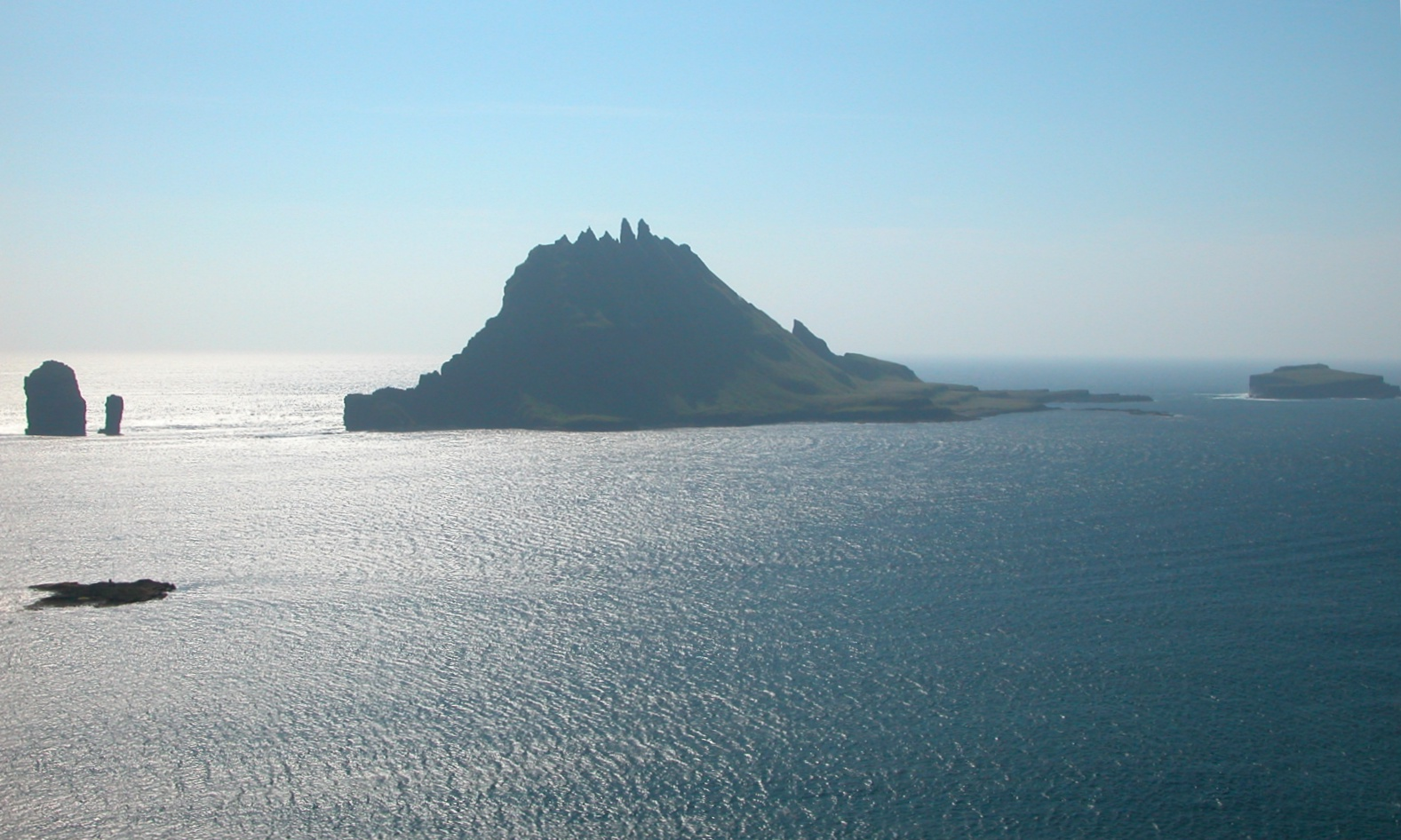
View of the islets of Tindhólmur (middle) and Gásholmur (right) with the stacks "Drangarnir" (left), Faroe Islands

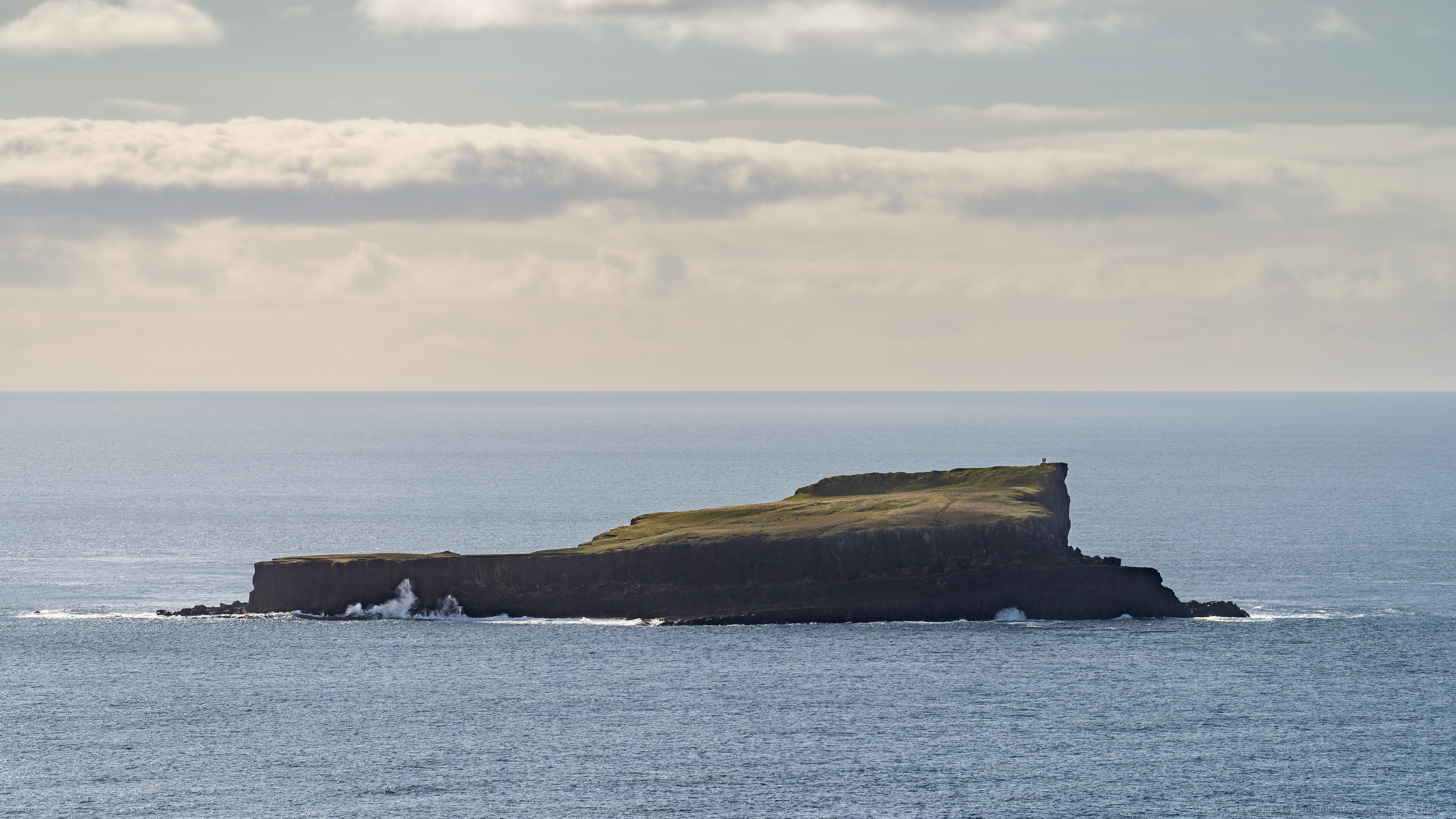
Gáshólmur Islet with sheep grazing, seen from North-east, September 2023.

Gáshólmur is a small islet on the southside of Sørvágsfjørður in the Faroe Islands. To the east of the islet lies another islet, Tindhólmur. The islet is uninhabited, and the only living creatures are seabirds and sheep rams, which are placed on the islet each year by the locals in Sørvágur. There is a lighthouse at the north-western extremity of the islet.

- Highest point: 65 m
- Size: 10 ha
