= List of runestones =

There are about 3,000 runestones in Scandinavia (out of a total of about 6,000 runic inscriptions).

The runestones are unevenly distributed in Scandinavia: The majority are found in Sweden, estimated at between 1,700 and 2,500 (depending on definition). Denmark has 250 runestones, and Norway has 50.

There are also runestones in other areas reached by the Viking expansion, especially in the British Isles. Most of these were on the Isle of Man where 31 from the Viking era have been found. Four have also been discovered in England, fewer than eight in Scotland and one or two in Ireland. There are scattered examples elsewhere (the Berezan' Runestone in Eastern Europe, and runic graffiti on the Piraeus Lion from Greece but today in Venice, Italy).

The vast majority of runestones date to the Viking Age and the period immediately following the Christianisation of Scandinavia (9th to 12th centuries). A small number predates the 9th century; one of the last runestones was raised in memory of the archbishop Absalon (d. 1201). A small number of runestones may date to the late medieval to early modern period, such as the Fámjin stone (Faroe Islands), dated to the Reformation period. Modern runestones (as imitations or forgeries of Viking Age runestones) began to be produced in the 19th century Viking Revival.

The Scandinavian Runic-text Data Base (Samnordisk runtextdatabas) is a project involving the creation and maintenance of a database of runestones in the Rundata database.

== Elder Futhark runestones ==
The vast majority of runestones date to the Viking Age. There is only a handful Elder Futhark (pre-Viking-Age) runestones (about eight, counting the transitional specimens created just around the beginning of the Viking Age).

Found in Norway

- Hole Runestone (50 BC–275 AD)
- Årstad Stone (390–590 AD)
- Einang stone (4th century)
- Tune Runestone (250–400 AD)
- Hogganvik runestone (350–500 AD)
- Eggjum stone (8th century)

Found in Sweden

- Kylver Stone (5th century)
- Möjbro Runestone (5th or early 6th century)
- Järsberg Runestone (transitional, 6th century)
- Björketorp Runestone (transitional, 7th century)
- Stentoften (transitional, 7th century)
- Rök runestone (transitional, ca. 800 AD)

== Younger Futhark runestones ==
=== The England runestones ===
The England runestones are a group of about 30 runestones located mostly in Sweden, with some in Norway, Denmark and northern Germany, which refer to Viking Age voyages to England.

=== Scandinavia proper ===
==== Sweden ====
Distribution of runestones in Sweden, the country with the highest density. Runestones / km^{2}: >10 5–9 1–4 <1 Lacks runestones

The number of runestones in Sweden is estimated at between 1,700 and 2,500 (depending on definition).

The Swedish district of Uppland has the highest concentration with as many as 1,196 inscriptions in stone, whereas Södermanland is second with 391).

- Varangian Runestones – inscriptions that mention voyages to the East (Austr) or the Eastern route (Austrvegr).
- Ingvar Runestones – 26 Varangian runestones that were raised in commemoration of those who died in the Swedish Viking expedition to the Caspian Sea of Ingvar the Far-Travelled.
- Serkland Runestones – six or seven runestones which are Varangian Runestones that mention voyages to Serkland, the Old Norse name for the Muslim world in the south.
- Greece Runestones – 29 Varangian runestones that talk of voyages to Greece, i.e. the Byzantine Empire.
- Viking Runestones – Stones that mention Scandinavians who participated in Viking expeditions in western Europe, and stones that mention men who were Viking warriors and/or died while travelling in the West.
- Jarlabanke Runestones – a collection of 20 runestones written in Old Norse related to Jarlabanke Ingefastsson and his clan.
- Frösöstenen
- The Ramsund carving
- Sparlösa Runestone
- Rökstenen – the longest runic inscription in the world, located in the province of Östergötland in Sweden

===== District of Hälsingland =====
- Hälsingland Rune Inscription 21

===== District of Medelpad =====
- Medelpad Rune Inscription 1
- Medelpad Rune Inscription 18

===== District of Småland =====
- Småland Runic Inscription 99

===== District of Skåne =====
- Sjörup Runestone
- Hyby Runestones (DR 264 and DR 265)

===== District of Uppland =====
- Färentuna Runestones (U 20, U 21 and U 22)
- Broby bro Runestones (U 135, U 136 and U 137)
- Hagby Runestones (U 152, U 153, U 154 and U 155)
- Uppland Runic Inscription 227 (U 227)
- Lingsberg Runestones (U 240, U 241 and U 242)
- Hargs bro runic inscriptions (U 309, U 310 and U 311)
- Snottsta and Vreta stones (U 329, U 330, U 331 and U 332)
- Granby Runestone (U 337)
- Näsby Runestone (U 455)
- Vaksala Runestone (U 961)
- Krogsta Runestone (U 1125)
- Gimo Runestone (U1132)

===== District Östergötland =====
- Högby Runestone
- Kälvesten Runestone
- Ledberg stone

===== District Gästrikland =====
- Gästrikland Runic Inscription 7 (Gs 7)

==== Denmark ====
Denmark has a total of 250 known runestones.

- Eltang stone
- Jelling stones
- Rimsø Runestone
- Snoldelev Stone
- Sørup runestone

==== Norway ====
Norway has a total of 50 known runestones.

- Dynna stone (11th century AD)
- Fåberg stone
- Granavollen Runestone (11th century AD)
- Grindheim stone (11th century AD)
- Hønen Runestone (11th century AD)
- Klepp I Runestone
- Kulisteinen (11th century AD)
- Norwegian Runic Inscription 239
- Oddernes stone (11th century AD)
- Vang stone (11th century AD)

=== North Atlantic ===
==== British Isles ====
- Manx runestones: 31 surviving stones.
- Princes Street Gardens Runestone, Edinburgh, Scotland

==== Faroe Islands ====
- Sandavágur stone (13th century)
- Kirkjubøur stone (11th century)
- Fámjin stone (16th century)

==== Greenland ====
- Kingittorsuaq Runestone

=== Other ===
==== Finland ====
- Stora Ängesön Runestone, Hitis (11th century AD)

==== Germany ====
- Hedeby stones, Hedeby (10th century AD)
- Sigtrygg Runestones (934 AD)
- Stone of Eric (10th century AD)

==== Italy ====
- Piraeus Lion, coming from Greece and today in Venice
- Sanctuary of Monte Sant'Angelo, Apulia (South Italy)

==== Ukraine ====
- Berezan' Runestone, Berezan' Island

== Image stones ==
- The Ardre image stones
- The Stora Hammars stones and the Tängelgarda stone, Lärbro parish

== Modern runestones ==
A number of notable runestones of modern origin exist. Some of them are intended as hoaxes, their creators attempting to imitate a Viking Age artefact. Especially since the late 20th century, runestones in the style of the Viking Age were also made without pretense of authenticity, either as independent works of art or as replicas as museum exhibits or tourist attractions.

This concerns especially runestones found in North America. There is also a limited set of early modern runestones created after the end of the Viking Age but before the "Viking Revival".

- Kensington Runestone
- Narragansett Runestone
- Oklahoma runestones
- Spirit Pond Runestone
- Vérendrye stone
- Wawa Runestone

== See also ==
- Runic alphabet
