= Slættanes =

- Abandoned village
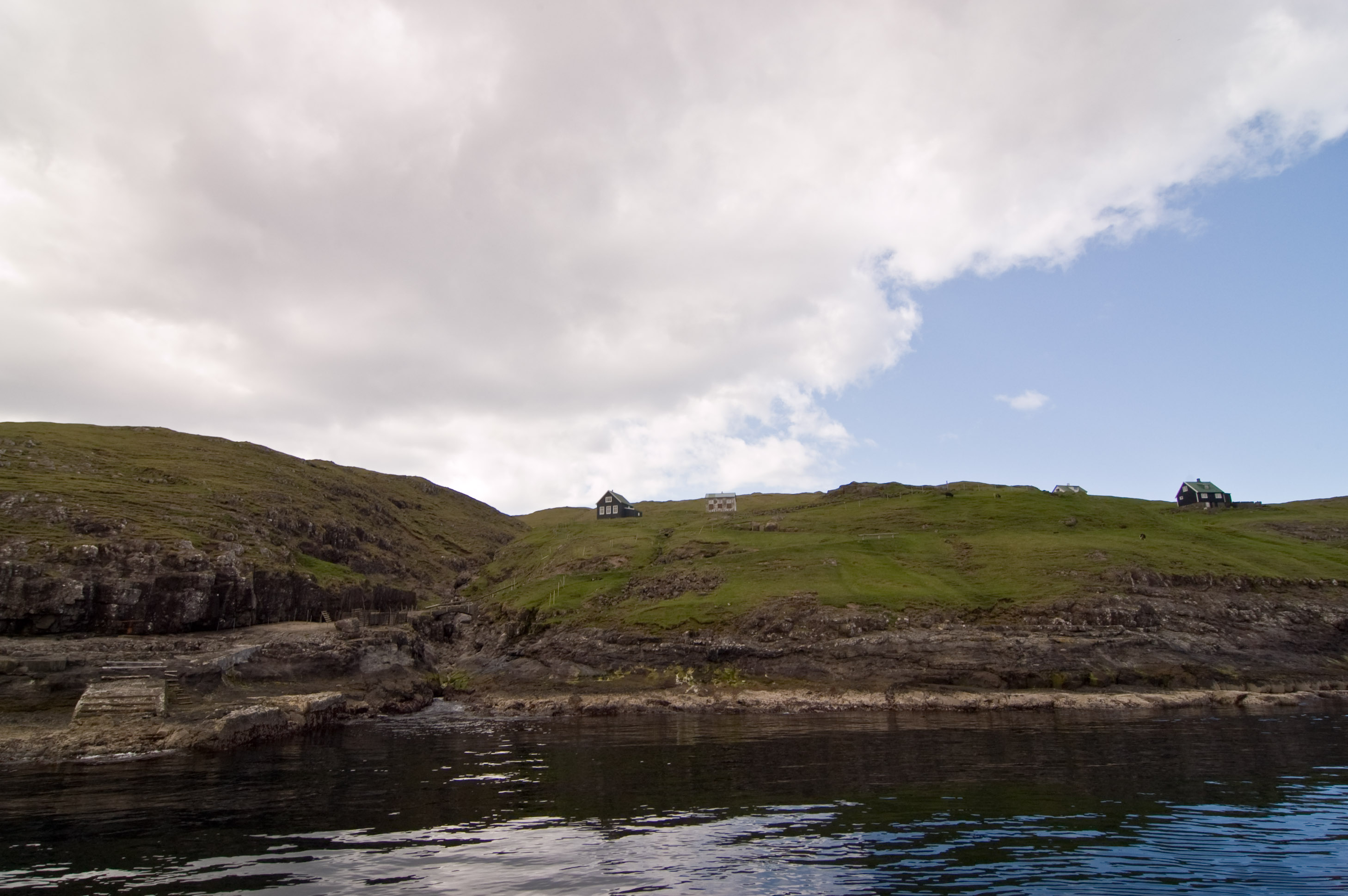
- Slættanes from the seaside, 2008

- Location in the Faroe Islands
- Coordinates: 62°09′N 7°14′W
- State: Kingdom of Denmark
- Constituent country: Faroe Islands
- Island: Vágar
- Municipality: Vága kommuna
- Founded: 1835

Population
  - Total: none
- Time zone: GMT
  - Summer (DST): UTC+1 (EST)

Slættanes (pronounced [ˈslaʰtːaˌneːs]) is a village on the island of Vágar in the western Faroes, which is now abandoned and only used as summer homes.

Slættanes, like the also-abandoned village of Víkar, is on the northern coast of the island. It was founded in 1835 by a man named Hendrik Thomasen and belonged to the municipality of Sandavágur in the south. During its best years (1945 to 1950) around 130 people lived in the village, but the average population was around 70. There were 12 houses in Slættanes. However, in 1965 the last inhabitants left the community because of its relatively isolated location.

A road was never built to Slættanes, but there are many trails there. One goes to Sandavágur in the southeast, another to Sørvágur to the south, and yet another goes west to Gásadalur. In the village itself there are no streets or discernible paths. The houses stand dispersed across the meadow and now serve as summer houses for the former residents and their relatives.

Postal service once arrived by foot from Sørvágur, and then later by a regular boat service from Vestmanna.
