= Sandavágur stone =

Runestone

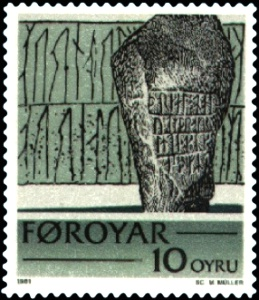
- Writing: Medieval runes
- Created: 13th century
- Discovered: 1917 AD; Sandavágur, Faroe Islands
- Present location: Sandavágur Church
- Culture: Norse
- Rundata ID: FR 2 M

Text – Native
- Old Norse: Þorkell Ǫnundar sonr, austmaðr af Rogalandi, bygði þenna stað fyrst.

Translation
- Þorkell Ǫnundr's son, man of the east from Rogaland, lived in this place first.

The Sandavágur stone (FR 2 M) is a runestone that was discovered in the town of Sandavágur on the Faroe Islands in 1917. The stone can today be seen in the Sandavágur Church.

The inscription describes Þorkell, a man from Rogaland, Norway, who claims to have lived in the Sandavágur area first. He is presumably one of the first settlers, if not the very first one. In both runes and language, the Sandavágur stone corresponds to what is known from Rogaland around the 13th century.

== See also ==
- Fámjin stone
- Kirkjubøur stone
