= Hagby Runestones =

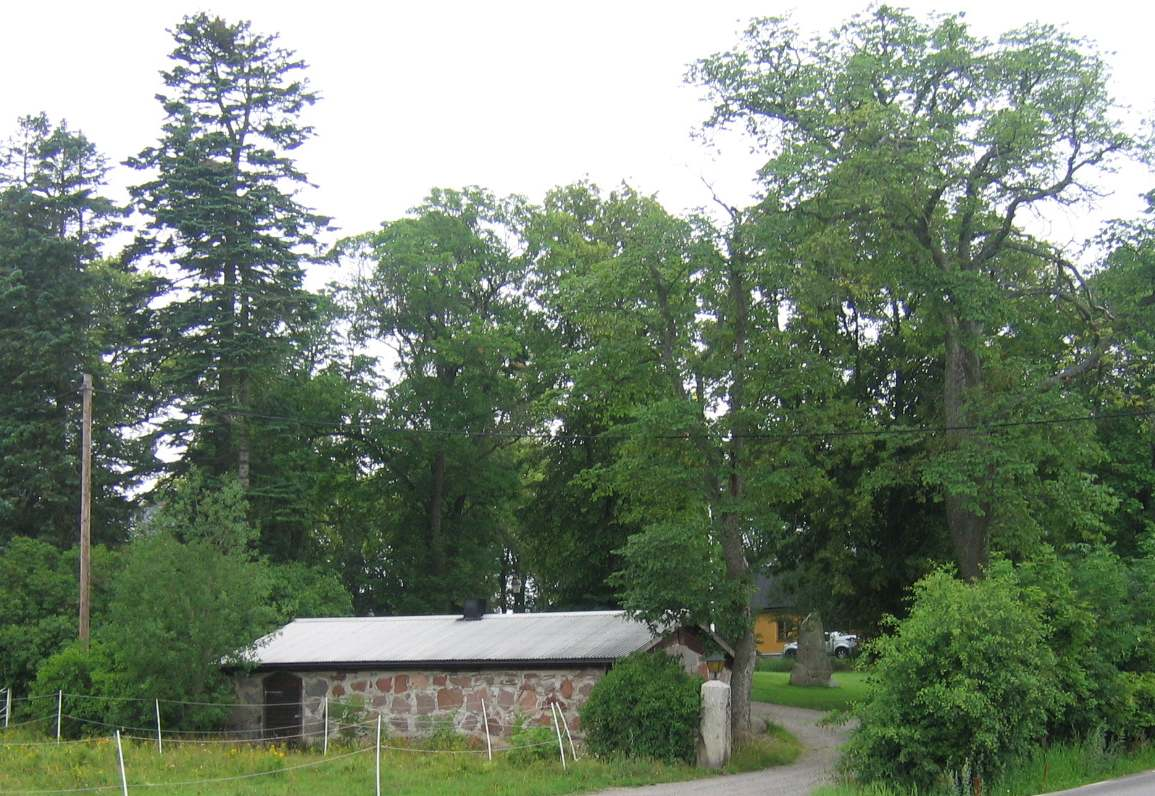
External view of Hagby. The runestone U 153 can be seen through the entrance.

The Hagby Runestones are four runestones that are raised on the courtyard of the farm Hagby in Uppland, Sweden. They are inscribed in Old Norse using the Younger Futhark and they date to the 11th century. Three of the runestones (U 153, U 154 and U 155) are raised in memory of Varangians who died somewhere in the East, probably in Kievan Rus'.

In 1929/30, they were discovered in the walls of the basement of the farm Litzby, which stood a few hundred metres from Hagby, but which burnt down in the 1880s. The runestones were burnt and fragmented but it was possible to piece 120 fragments together into the four runestones that are found on the courtyard of Hagby today.

There are additional runestones on the property of Hagby, and notably U 143, which is treated in the article Uppland Rune Inscriptions 101, 143 and 147, and U 148, which is treated in the article Jarlabanke Runestones.

== U 152 ==
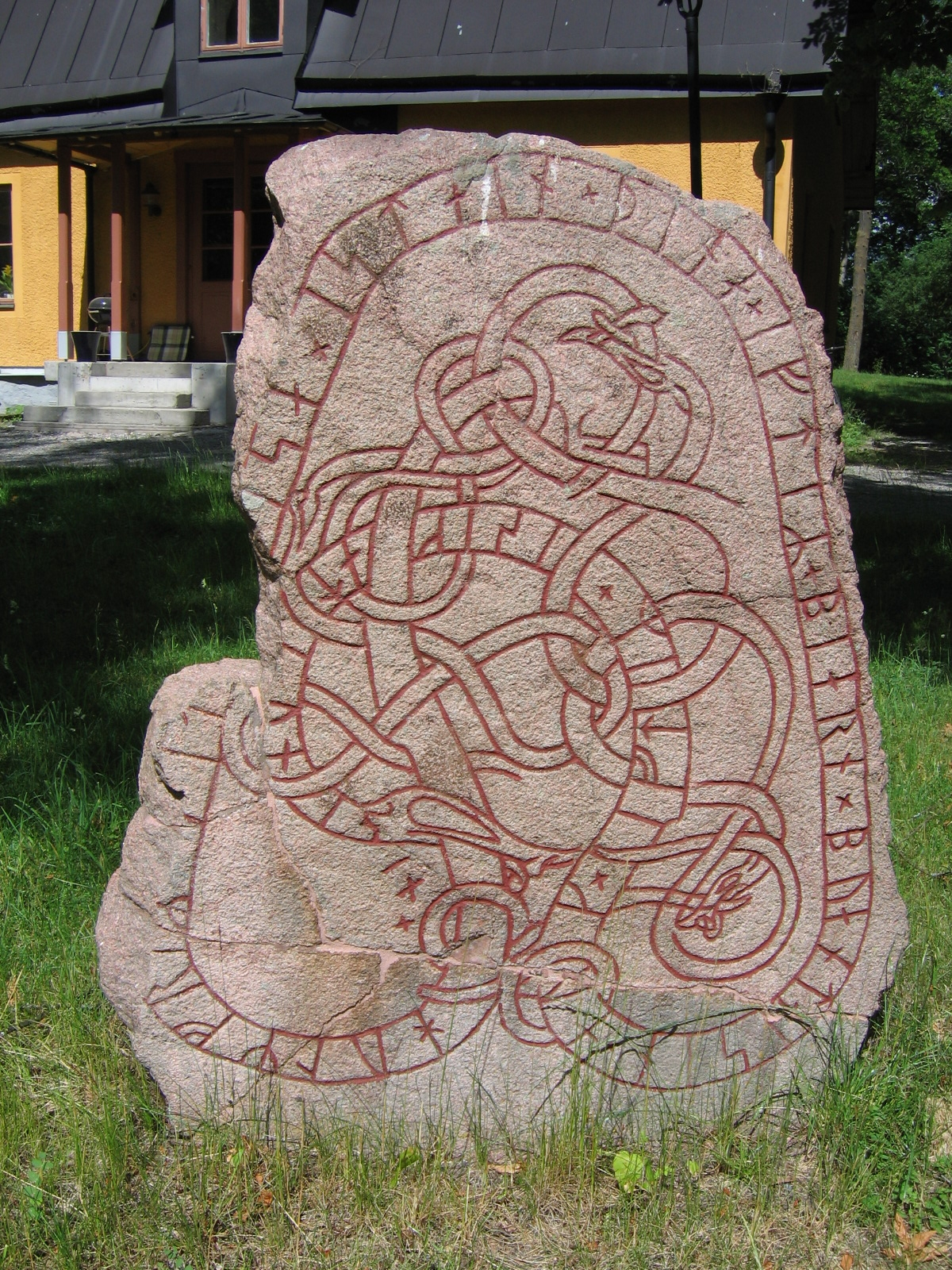
The runestone U 152.

This runestone is raised by a lady named Holmfríðr who had lost both her husband Björn and their son Sighvatr. The inscription is classified as being in runestone style Pr4, also known as the Urnes style. This runestone style is characterized by slim and stylized animals that are interwoven into tight patterns. The animals heads are typically seen in profile with slender almond-shaped eyes and upwardly curled appendages on the noses and the necks.

× hulmfriʀ × -it --isa × istain × þina × iftiʀ × biarn × buanta isin × auk × iftiʀ × isikat (s)un isin ×
{} Holmfríðr {} [l]ét [re]isa {} stein {} þenna {} eptir {} Bjǫrn, {} bónda sinn, {} ok {} eptir {} Sighvat, son sinn. {}
{} Holmfriðr {} [l]et [ræ]isa {} stæin {} þenna {} æftiʀ {} Biorn, {} boanda sinn, {} ok {} æftiʀ {} Sighvat, sun sinn. {}
Holmfríðr had this stone raised in memory of Bjǫrn, her husbandman and in memory of Sighvatr, her son.

== U 153 ==
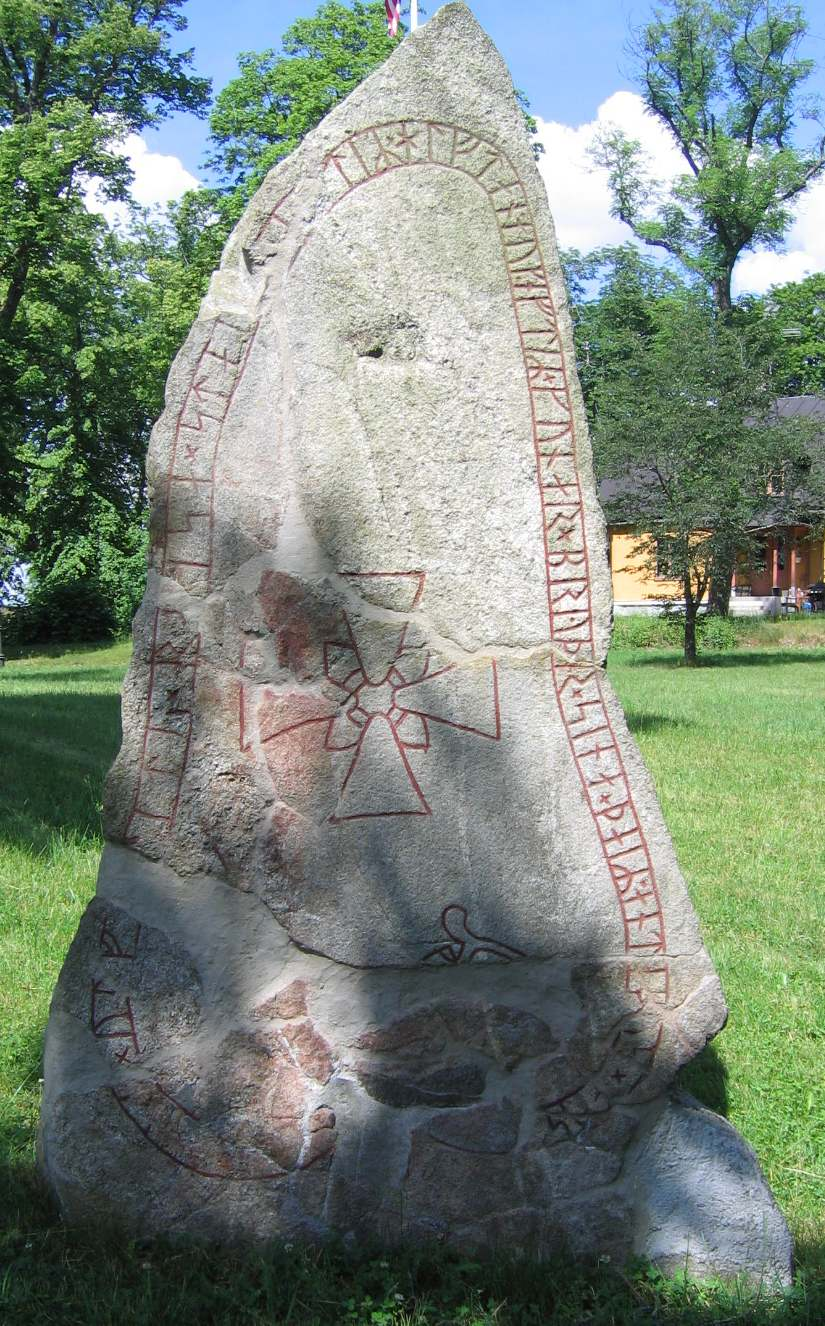
The runestone U 153.

This runestone is raised by the same Sveinn and Ulfr as on the U 155, below, which is probably the other runestone mentioned in the inscription. They had them made in memory of their brothers Halfdan and Gunnarr who died somewhere in the East, as Varangians. It has been suggested that the words after east may be either "in Greece" or "in Garðar (Kiev)," but a fracture in the runestone prevents any actual reading of these runes. This inscription is classified as being in runestone style Pr3, which is also a Urnes style.

…[(u)](a)i- × [(a)]uk × ulf- litu × raisa × stai-(a) × e(f)tiʀ × hlftan · auk · eftiʀ × kunar × bryþr × sina × þaiʀ · antaþus × aust… …(u)m
[S]vei[nn] {} ok {} Ulf[r] létu {} reisa {} stei[n]a {} eptir {} Halfdan {} ok {} eptir {} Gunnar, {} brœðr {} sína. {} Þeir {} enduðust {} aust[r] …
[S]væi[nn] {} ok {} Ulf[ʀ] letu {} ræisa {} stæi[n]a {} æftiʀ {} Halfdan {} ok {} æftiʀ {} Gunnar, {} brøðr {} sina. {} Þæiʀ {} ændaðus {} aust[r] …
Sveinn and Ulfr had the stones raised in memory of Halfdan and in memory of Gunnarr, their brothers. They met their end in the east …

== U 154 ==
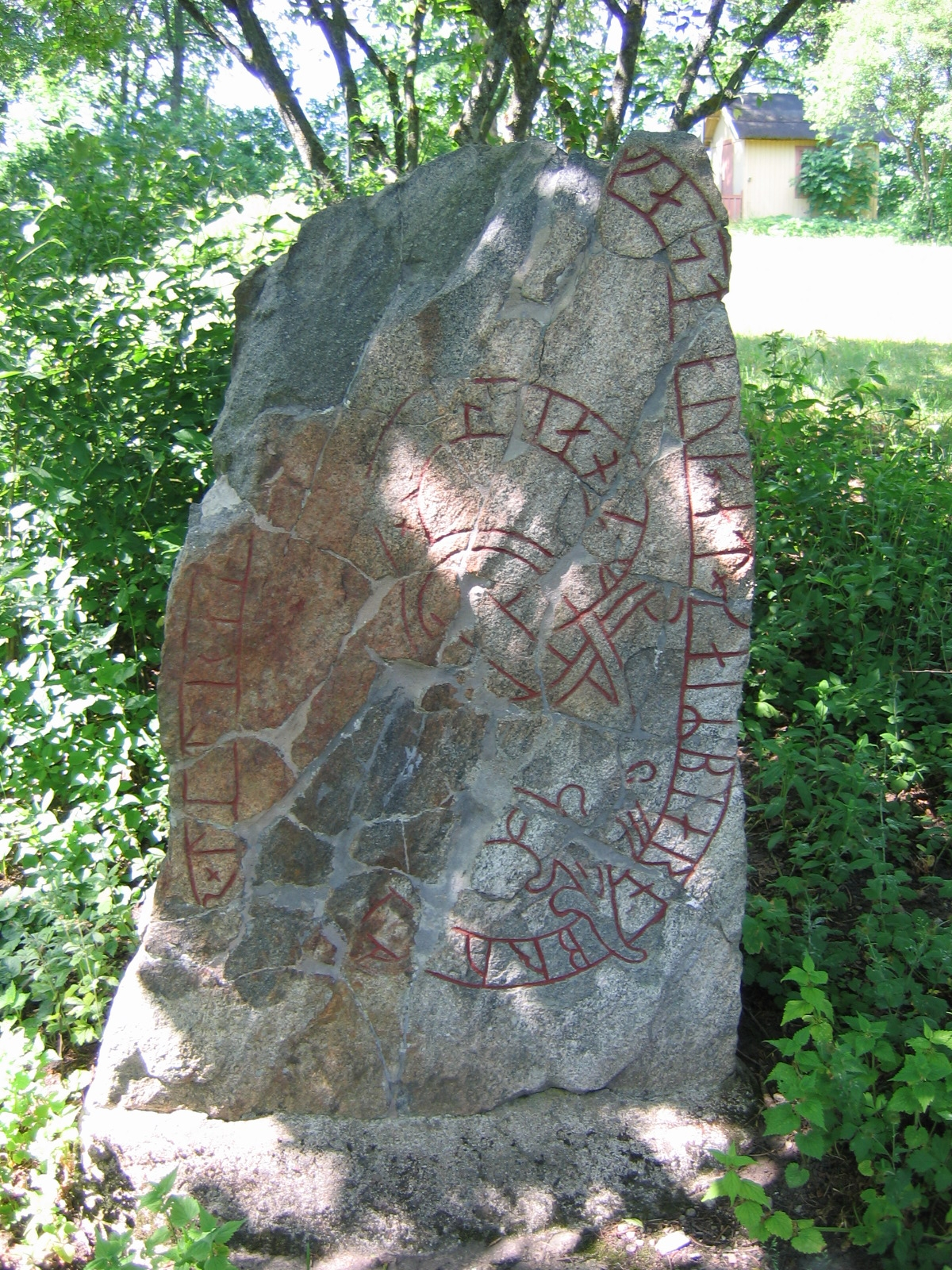
The runestone U 154.

This runestone is also raised in memory of Varangians who died somewhere in the east, but these are different people from those in the previous runestone and in the following one. U 154 is classified as being carved in runestone style Pr3.

[þ(o)]…r × lit × rai… … …fast · auk × at × (k)aiʀbiarn × bruþ- … …i(ʀ) · (t)o a(u)s… ×
… {} lét {} rei[sa] … …fast {} ok {} at {} Geirbjǫrn, {} brœð[r] … [þe]ir {} dóu aus[tr]. {}
… {} let {} ræi[sa] … …fast {} ok {} at {} Gæiʀbiorn, {} brøð[r] … [þæ]iʀ {} dou aus[tr]. {}
… had raised … …-fastr and in memory of Geirbjǫrn, (their) brothers … They died in the east.

== U 155 ==
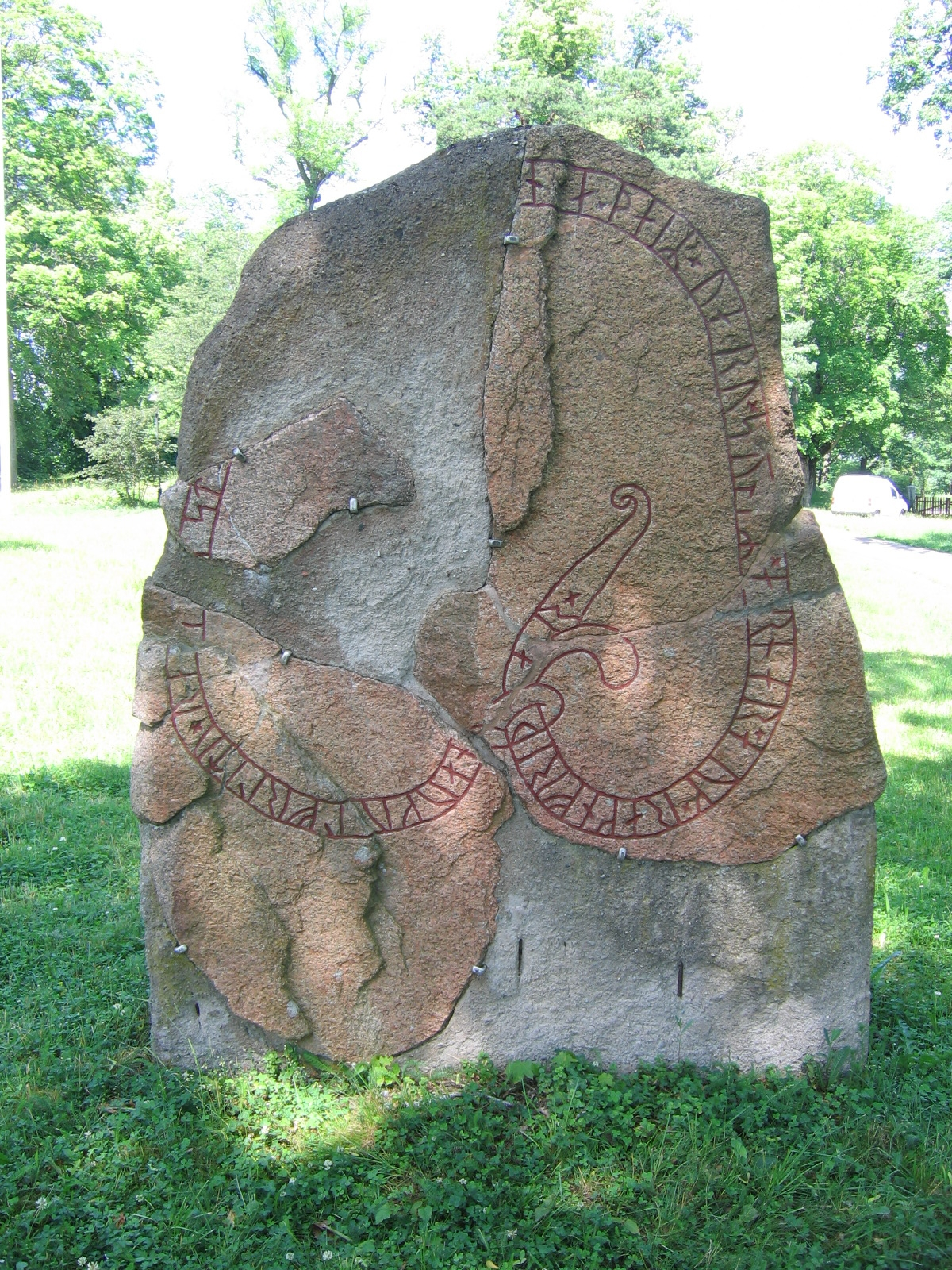
The runestone U 155.

This runestone is raised by the same Sveinn and Ulfr as U 153, above. This stone adds the names of Örn and Ragnfríðr, the parents of the four brothers.

…n × auk × ulfr litu × rai(s)(a) sta… … … …na × þaiʀ × uaru × suniʀ × arnar × auk × raknfriþar ×
[Svei]nn {} ok {} Ulfr létu {} reisa ste[ina eptir brœðr sí]na. {} Þeir {} váru {} synir {} Arnar {} ok {} Ragnfríðar. {}
[Svæi]nn {} ok {} Ulfʀ letu {} ræisa stæ[ina æftiʀ brøðr si]na. {} Þæiʀ {} vaʀu {} syniʀ {} Arnaʀ {} ok {} Ragnfriðaʀ. {}
Sveinn and Ulfr had the stones raised in memory of their brothers. They were the sons of Ǫrn and Ragnfríðr.

== See also ==
- List of runestones

== Other sources ==
- Rundata
- The article Hagby gård on the site of the local heritage society of Täby, retrieved June 27, 2007.
