= Näsby Runestone =

Coordinates: 59°38′02″N 17°47′55″E

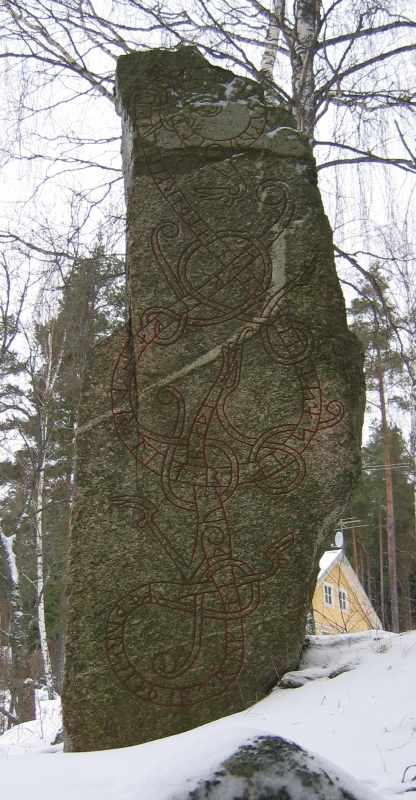
The Näsby Runestone U 455 in 2007.

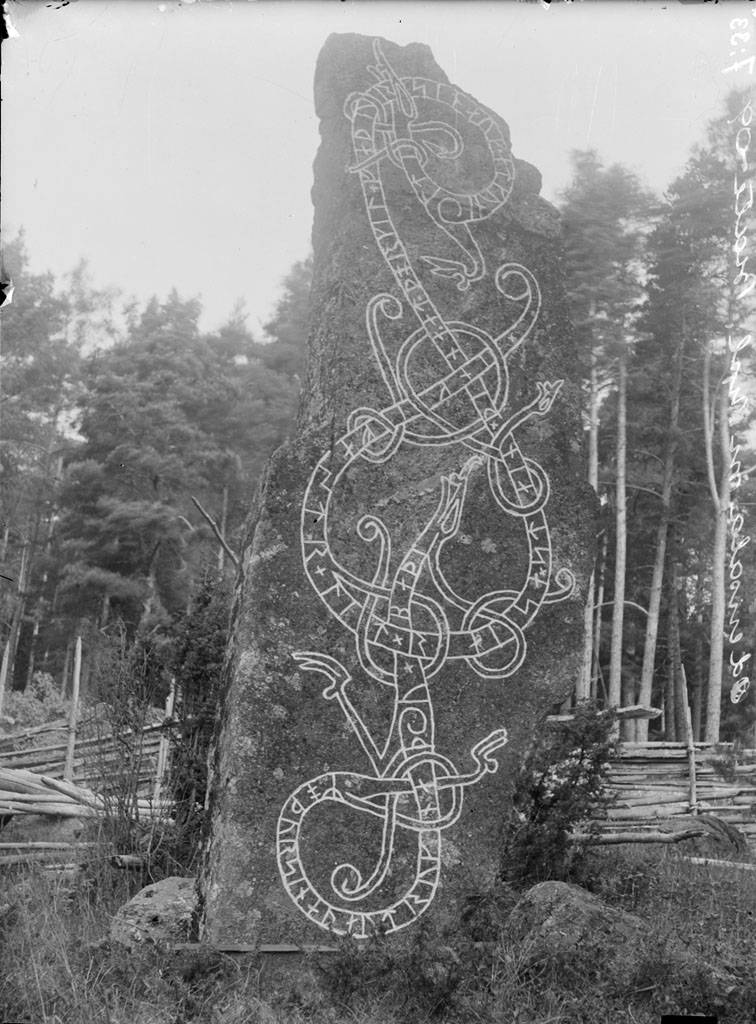
The runestone in 1909.

The Näsby Runestone, designated as U 455 under the Rundata catalog, is a Viking Age memorial runestone that is located in Näsby, Uppland, Sweden.

== Description ==
The Näsby Runestone memorializes a family tragedy. It was raised by a man in remembrance of his parents who had both drowned. The design on the granite stone, which is three meters in height, consists of runic text that is inscribed on the bodies of thin beasts. The inscription was found during a survey in 1995-96 to be well preserved, with none of the runes damaged. The inscription is classified as being carved in runestone style Pr4, which is also known as Urnes style. This runestone style is characterized by slim and stylized animals that are interwoven into tight patterns. The animal heads are typically seen in profile with slender almond-shaped eyes and upwardly curled appendages on the noses and the necks. The inscription, although unsigned, for stylistic reasons is attributed to the runemaster Fot, who was active in the mid-eleventh century.

== Inscription ==
× inkifastr + lit × raisa × stain × þina at þorkil + faþur sin (a)uk at kunilti moþur sina þa(u) truknaþu × baþi
{} Ingifastr {} let {} ræisa {} stæin {} þenna at Þorkel, {} faður sinn, ok at Gunnhildi, moður sina. Þau drunknaðu {} baði.
Ingifastr had this stone raised in memory of Þorkell, his father, and in memory of Gunnhildr, his mother. They both drowned.

== See also ==
- List of runestones
