= Hyby Runestones =

Two Viking Age memorial runestones

The Hyby Runestones, designated as DR 264 and DR 265 in the Rundata catalog, are two Viking Age memorial runestones located at Hyby near Vissmarlöv, which is about two kilometers southeast of Klågerup, Scania, Sweden. The former stone, DR 265, is considered lost.

== DR 264 ==
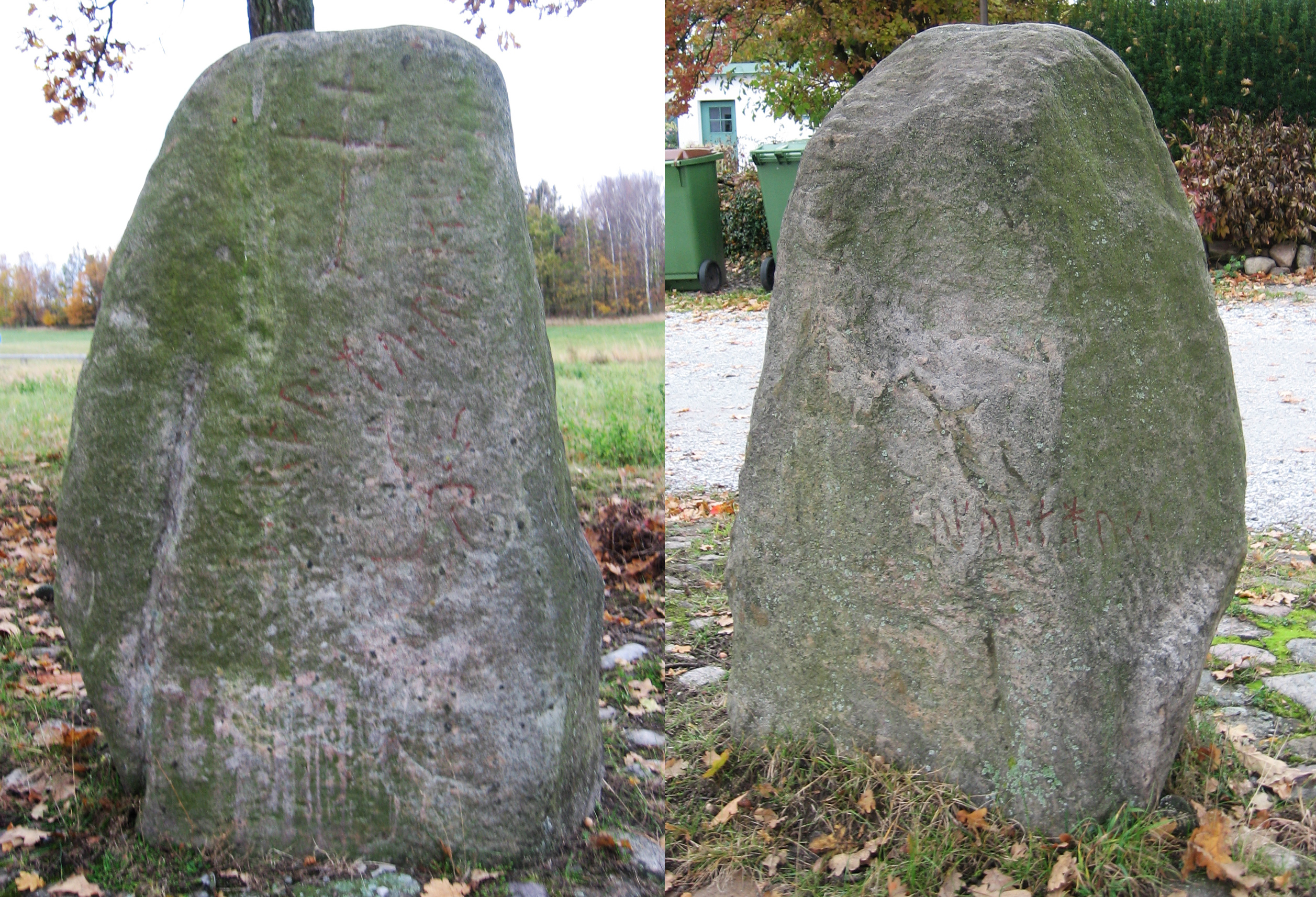
Two sides of the Hyby 1 runestone.

Runic inscription DR 264, also known as the Hyby 1 Runestone, is carved on a granite stone that is 0.9 meters in height. It was discovered in 1624 in a field near Vissmarlöv, and was moved to its current location in the 1940s. The inscription consists of runic text in the younger futhark on both sides of the stone, and a Christian cross and a deer on side A. The inscription is classified as being carved in runestone style RAK, which is the classification for the oldest style. This is the classification for runic bands that have straight ends which do not have any attached serpent or beast heads. The inscription is dated as being carved after that of the Jelling stones.

The runic text states that Þórðr carved the inscription and asserts that a man named either Folkvé or Fullugi owned Haugbýr, the present location Hyby.

The stone is locally known as the Hybystenen and sometimes as the Vissmarlövstenen.

=== Inscription ===
==== Transliteration of the runes into Latin characters ====
A: þurþr * hu * runaʀ * þasi * ...r... * ---
B: fulukui : a : huk*-... ...

==== Transcription into Old Norse ====
A: Þorþr hio runaʀ þæssi ... ...
B: Folkwi/Fullugi a Høg[by] ...

==== Translation in English ====
A: Þórðr cut these runes ... ...
B: Folkvé/Fullugi owns Haugbýr ...

== DR 265 ==
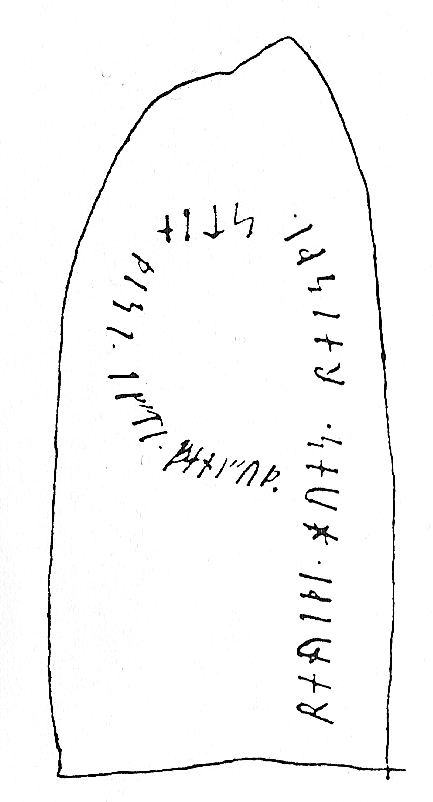
1757 drawing of the Hyby 2 runestone.

Runic inscription DR 265 or the Hyby 2 Runestone is known from a drawing made by Nils Wessman (1710 - 1763) during a survey of runestones in Scania conducted around 1757. The stone has been missing since about 1850.

Based upon the drawing, the runic text in the younger futhark starts at the bottom of the stone. The first word ranuiþi was spelled using a bind rune that combines an n-rune and u-rune.

=== Inscription ===
==== Transliteration of the runes into Latin characters ====
[ran=uiþi * huas * raisþi * stin þisi * ifti * þanfuþ *]

==== Transcription into Old Norse ====
<ranuiþi> <huas> resþi sten þæssi æftiʀ <þanfuþ>.

==== Translation in English ====
<ranuiþi> <huas> raised this stone in memory of <þanfuþ>.

== See also ==
- List of runestones
