= Rimsø Runestone =

10th century Danish runestone

Coordinates: 56.4787°N 10.7952°E

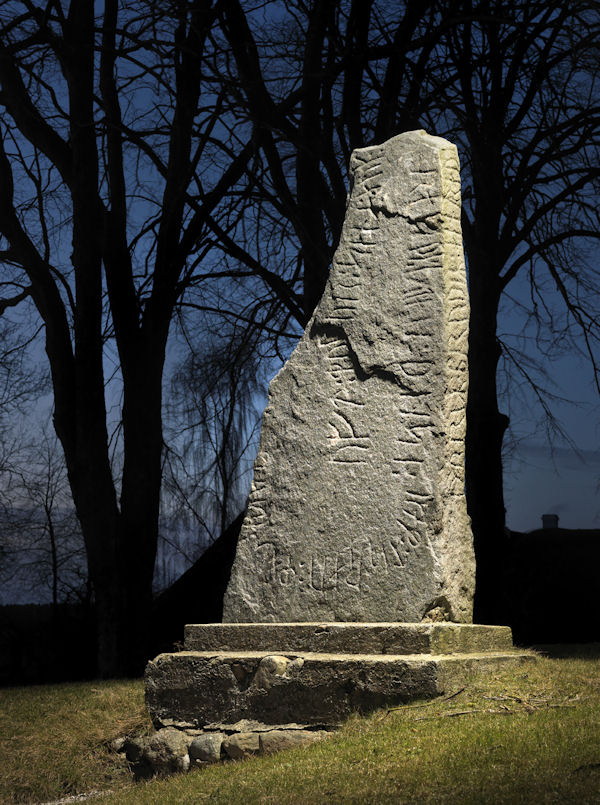

The Rimsø stone or DR 114 is a runestone from the 10th century near Århus in Denmark. It is one of few runestones raised after a woman, and it is raised by her son who exclaims that losing one's mother is the worst thing that can happen to a boy.

== Inscription ==
þuriʀ : bruþiʀ : ainraþa
Þoriʀ, {} broþiʀ {} Enraþa,
Þórir, Einráði's brother,

rai=sþi : stain : þonsi {: ¶} uft : muþur : sina : auk {: ¶} ... ku... ¶ ... -auþi : sam : uarst : maki
resþi {} sten {} þænsi {} æft {} moþur {} sina {} ok {} ... ... {} ... [d]øþi {} sum {} wærst {} mægi.
raised this stone in memory of his mother and ... ... ... death is the worst (misfortune) for a boy.

== See also ==
- List of runestones

== Sources ==
- MJy 41: Rimsø-sten at Danske Runeindskrifter (in Danish)
- DR 114 at the Scandinavian Runic-text Database
- A site on Danish runestones with pictures.
