= Víkar, Faroe Islands =

Víkar
- Abandoned village
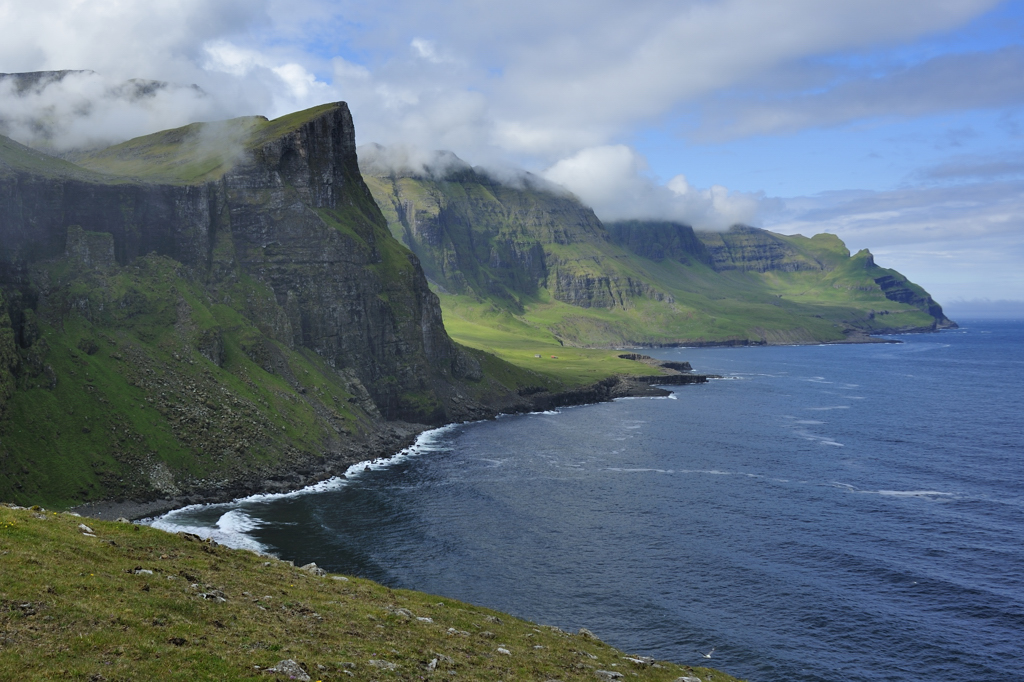

- Location in the Faroe Islands
- Coordinates: 62°8′N 7°22′W
- State: Kingdom of Denmark
- Constituent country: Faroe Islands
- Island: Vágar
- Municipality: Vága kommuna
- Founded: 1833

Population
  - Total: none
- Time zone: GMT
  - Summer (DST): UTC+1 (EST)

Víkar (pronounced [ˈvʊikaɹ]) is an abandoned village in the Faroe Islands on the north coast of the island of Vágar.

The name Víkar means coves in Faroese, a name with a similar meaning to that of the island of Vágar itself.

== History ==
Víkar was founded in 1833 and belonged to the village of Gásadalur farther south. Even today a path still connects the two communities with each other. Even though the landscape was very favourable, Víkar had already been abandoned by 1910, because it was too difficult to reach. It shared this fate with its former neighbouring community of Slættanes, which had also been founded during the same period.

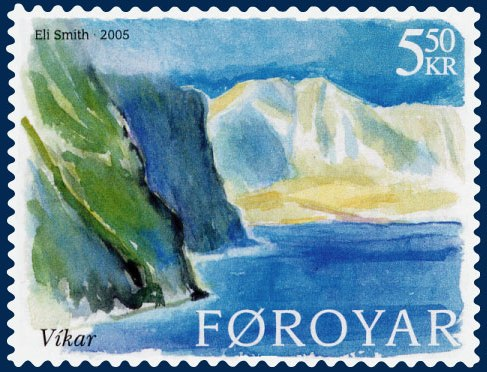
Stamp by the Faroese painter Eli Smith, 2005.
