= Grindheim Church (Vestland) =

Church in Vestland, Norway

- Grindheim kyrkje
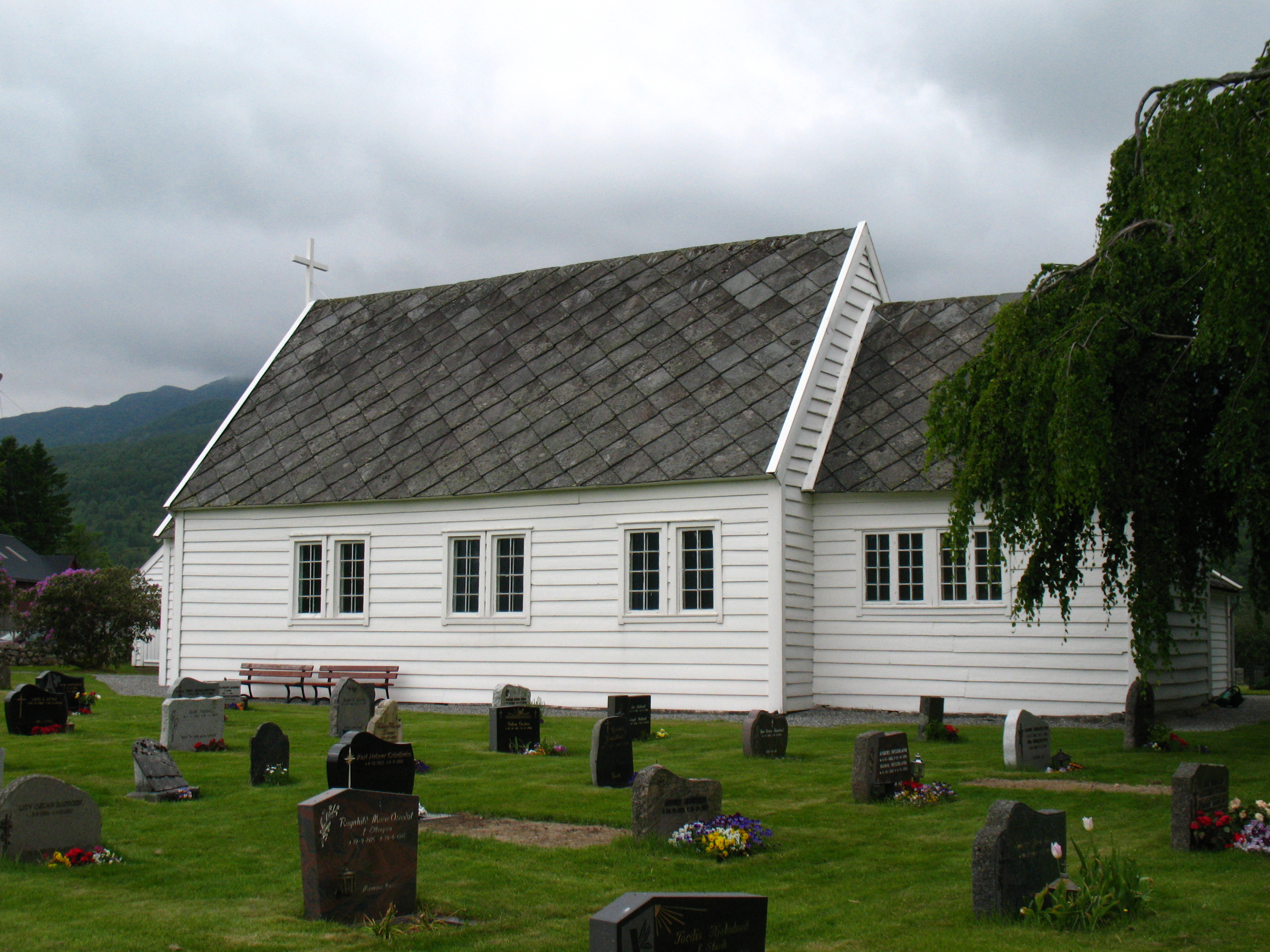
- View of the church
- Grindheim Church
- 59°40′12″N 6°00′13″E
- Location: Etne Municipality, Vestland
- Country: Norway
- Denomination: Church of Norway
- Previous denomination: Catholic Church
- Churchmanship: Evangelical Lutheran

History
- Status: Parish church
- Founded: 13th century
- Consecrated: 1724

Architecture
- Functional status: Active
- Architectural type: Long church
- Completed: 1724 (302 years ago)

Specifications
- Capacity: 250
- Materials: Wood

Administration
- Diocese: Bjørgvin bispedømme
- Deanery: Sunnhordland prosti
- Parish: Etne
- Norwegian Cultural Heritage Site
- Type: Church
- Status: Automatically protected
- ID: 84426

Grindheim Church (Norwegian: Grindheim kyrkje) is a parish church of the Church of Norway in Etne Municipality in Vestland county, Norway. It is located in the village of Etnesjøen. It is one of the churches for the Etne parish which is part of the Sunnhordland prosti (deanery) in the Diocese of Bjørgvin. The white, wooden church was built in a long church design in 1724 using plans drawn up by an unknown architect. The church seats about 250 people.

== History ==
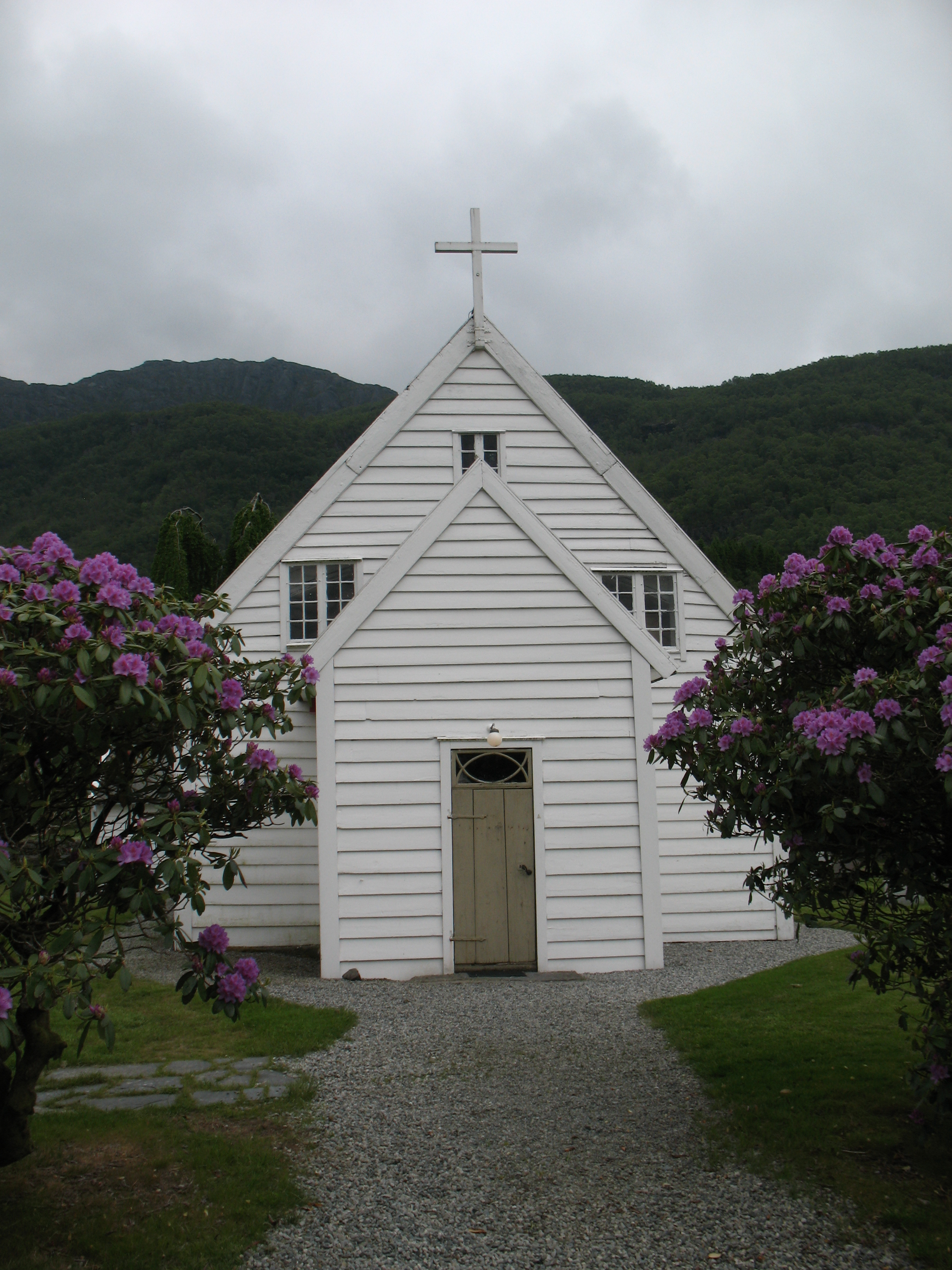
View of the church

The earliest existing historical records of the church date back to the year 1326, but it was not new that year. The church was a wooden stave church that was likely built during the 13th century. The location must have been an important site on which to build a church since this location includes the largest pre-Christian burial site in Etne with more than 200 burial mounds. Today most of it is cultivated farmland and only some large mounds remain. To the far south is a large site with small mounds dating from the Bronze Age.

In 1673, the church was badly damaged in a storm (like the nearby Gjerde Church), but this church was repaired and its structure was reinforced. By 1722, the old stave church was described as having a 13.8-by-8.8-metre (45 ft × 29 ft) nave with a 6.9-by-7.5-metre (23 ft × 25 ft) choir and a square tower at the west end of the building. Shortly after this, in 1723-1724, the old stave church was torn down and a new church building was constructed on the same site. The church bells in the tower date from 1628 and 1751, respectively. The building was extended to the west in 1854. In 1954–55 the church was renovated and restored. During this renovation, a new sacristy was built on the north side of the chancel.

The Grindheim stone stands near the north exterior wall. It is a 3.75-metre (12.3 ft) tall stone and it was found in the cemetery wall. It is a memorial stone from around the year 1050 with a carved cross and the runic inscription: "Tormod erected this stone in honour of Tormod Svidade's father". The stone cross in front of the church dates from the period immediately after the Christianization of Norway.

== See also ==
- List of churches in Bjørgvin
