= Myresjö =

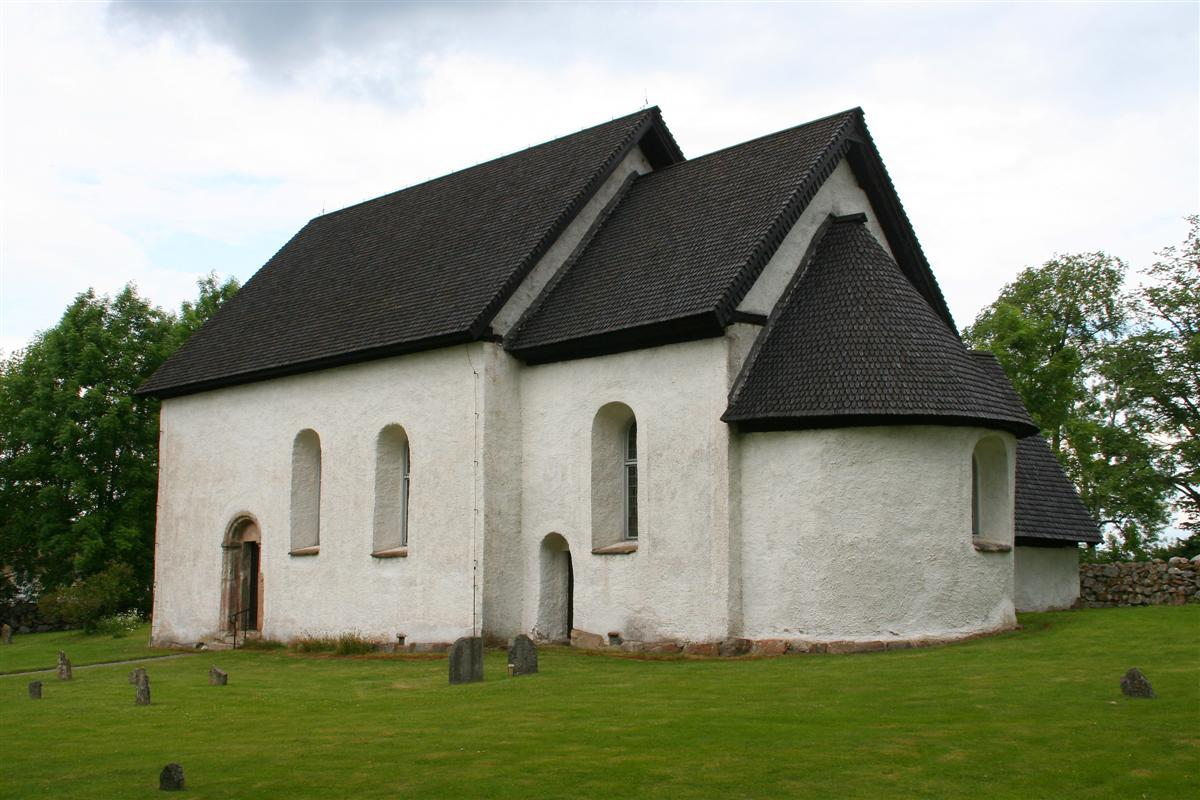
- Old church in Myresjö

- Location within Jönköping Location within Sweden
- Coordinates: 57°23′N 14°57′E
- Country: Sweden
- Province: Småland
- County: Jönköping County
- Municipality: Vetlanda Municipality

Area
  - Total: 0.91 km^{2} (0.35 sq mi)

Population (31 December 2010)
  - Total: 646
  - Density: 713/km^{2} (1,850/sq mi)
- Time zone: UTC+1 (CET)
  - Summer (DST): UTC+2 (CEST)
- Climate: Cfb

Myresjö is a locality situated in Vetlanda Municipality, Jönköping County, Sweden with 646 inhabitants in 2010.

== Sports ==
The following sports clubs are located in Myresjö:

- Myresjö IF

== See also ==
- Småland Runic Inscription 99
