= Uppland Runic Inscription 227 =

Viking Age memorial runestone in Sweden

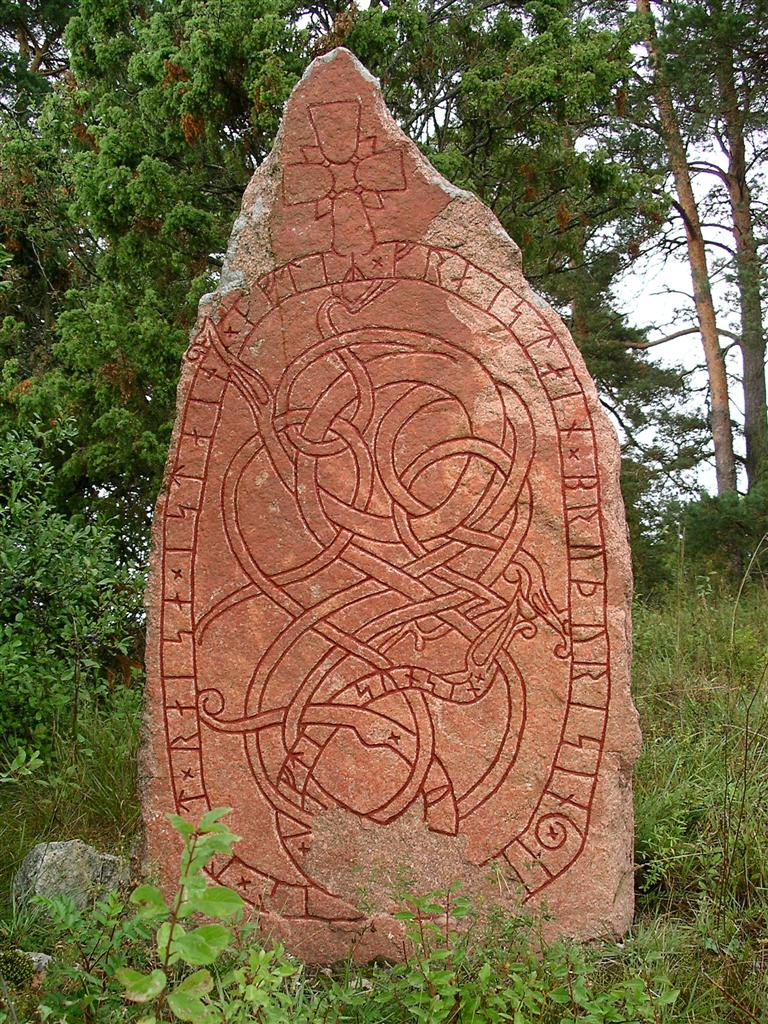
Runic inscription U 227 is located Grana, Uppland, Sweden.

Uppland Runic Inscription 227 or U 227 is the Rundata catalog designation for a Viking Age memorial runestone that is located in Grana, which is about 4 kilometers (2.5 mi) west of Vallentuna, Stockholm County, Sweden, and in the historic province of Uppland.

== Description ==
This inscription consists of runic text in the Younger Futhark carved on a serpent that circles and then becomes intertwined with other serpents in the center. A Christian cross is at the top of the granite stone, which is 1.45 meters (4 ft 9 in) in height. The inscription is classified as being carved in runestone style Pr4, which is also known as Urnes style. This runestone style is characterized by slim and stylized animals that are interwoven into tight patterns. The animal heads are typically seen in profile with slender almond-shaped eyes and upwardly curled appendages on the noses and the necks.

The runic inscription states that the stone is a memorial raised by Ulfkell in memory of his brother Freysteinn, and possibly in a damaged section mentions the name of the father of Freysteinn. The name Ulfkell is a shortened form of the name Ulfketill, which combines two common Viking Age name elements that mean "Wolf Cauldron". The brother's name, Freysteinn, contains the name of the Norse pagan god Freyr as a theophoric name element and means "Freyr's Stone".

== Inscription ==
=== Transliteration of the runes into Latin characters ===
× u(l)[k]il × lit × raisa × istain × iftiʀ × fraistain × bruþur isin × a[uk × k]u[ntru] × ifti sun sin ×

=== Transcription into Old Norse ===
Ulfkell let ræisa stæin æftiʀ Frøystæin, broður sinn, ok <kuntru> æftiʀ sun sinn.

=== Translation in English ===
Ulfkell had the stone raised in memory of Freysteinn, his brother; and <kuntru> in memory of his son.

== See also ==
- List of runestones
