= Småland Runic Inscription 99 =

Viking age runestone inscription

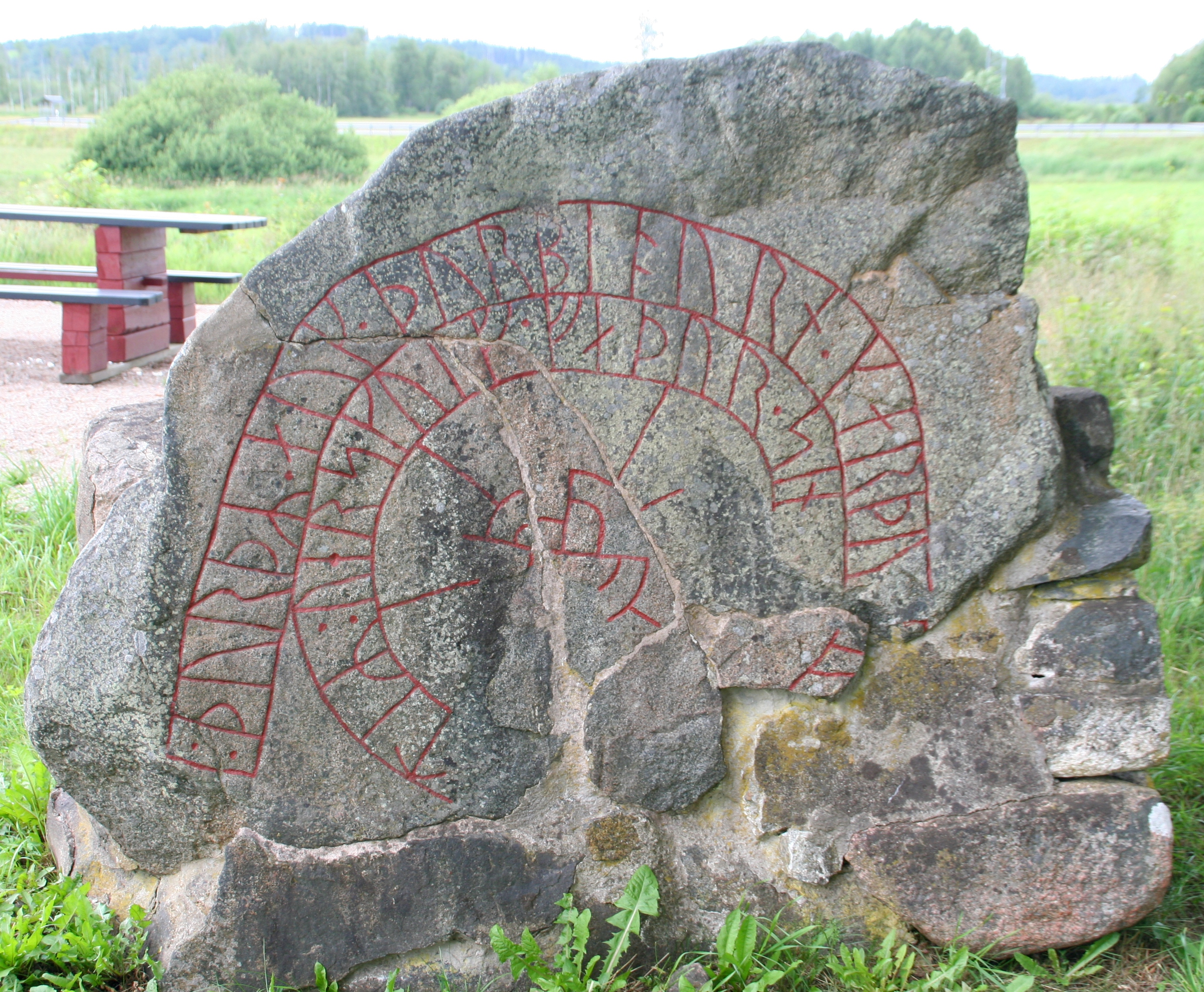
Runestone Sm 99 is located in Nederby.

This runic inscription, designated as Sm 99 in the Rundata catalog, is on a Viking Age memorial runestone located in Nederby, which is about two kilometers northwest of Myresjö, Jönköping County, Sweden, and in the historic province of Småland.

== Description ==
The inscription on this granite runestone, which is 1.55 meters in height, consists of runic text in the younger futhark inscribed within a spiral text band. The stone is near a road and a small stream, and the runic text states that a bridge was made as a memorial. The reference to bridge-building in the runic text is fairly common in runestones during this time period. Some are Christian references related to passing the bridge into the afterlife. At this time, the Catholic Church sponsored the building of roads and bridges through a practice similar to an indulgence in return for the church's intercession for the soul of the departed. There are many examples of these bridge stones dated from the eleventh century, including runic inscriptions Sö 101 in Ramsund, U 69 in Eggeby, and U 489 in Morby. Nearby to Sm 99 on the other side of the stream is a second runestone, Sm 100 in Glömsjö, which also discusses the building of a bridge as a memorial. It is unclear if the two stones refer to the same bridge or if two families cooperated in its construction.

The runic text states that two sons named Þórðr and Þorbjôrn built the bridge and raised the stone as a memorial to their father Verskulfr. Of the personal names mentioned in the text, two contain the Norse pagan god Thor as a theophoric name element. The name Þorbjôrn translates as "Thor Bear," and Þórðr is a shortened form of Þór-röðr, a common male name form based upon the god's name.

== Inscription ==
=== Transliteration of the runes into Latin characters ===
: þurþʀ * auk * þurbiourn * karþu [b](r)(u) [þas]i [ef]tiʀ : uersku(l)f * faþur * sin

=== Transcription into Old Norse ===
Þórðr ok Þorbjôrn gerðu brú þessa eptir Verskulf, fôður sinn.

=== Translation in English ===
Þórðr and Þorbjôrn made this bridge in memory of Verskulfr, their father.

== See also ==
- List of runestones
