= Krogsta Runestone =

Runestone in Uppsala Municipality, Sweden

Coordinates: 60.0304°N 18.0705°E

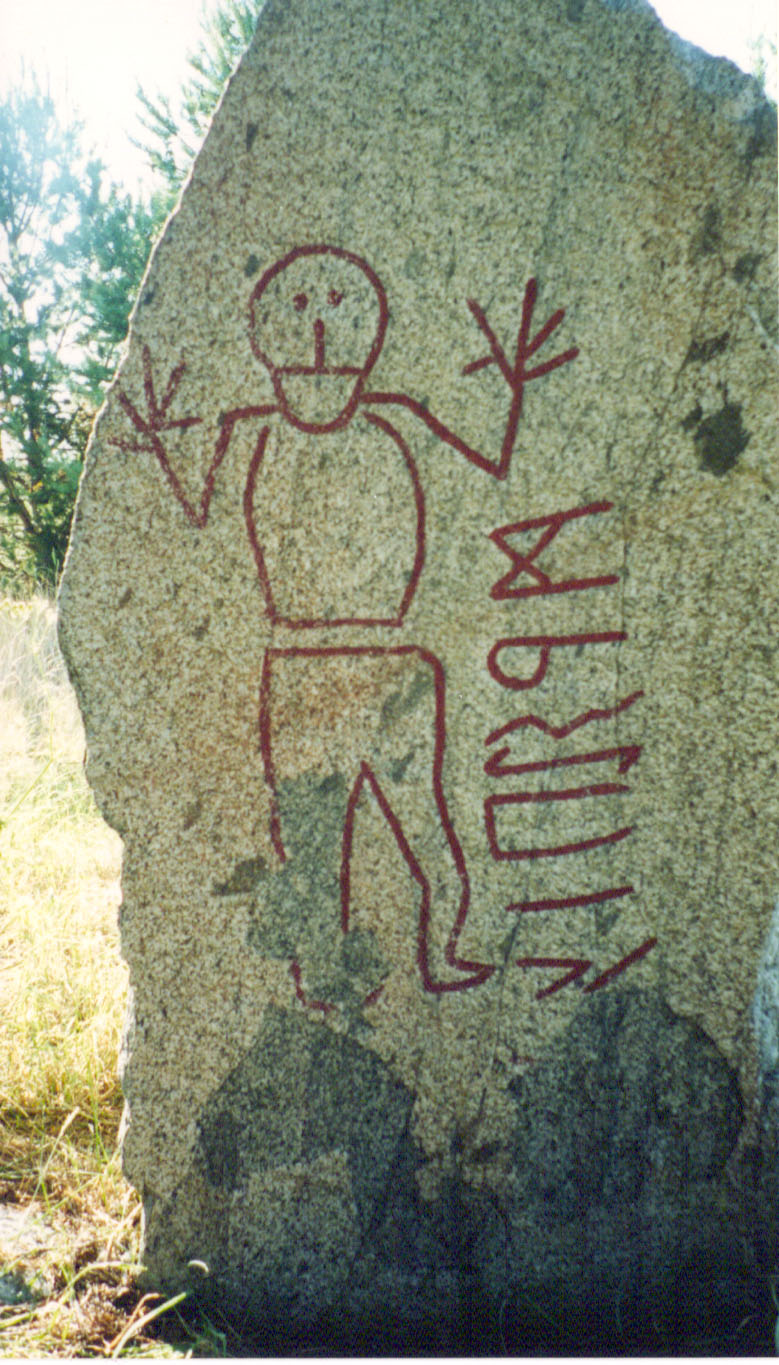
- Writing: Elder Futhark
- Created: 6th–8th century
- Discovered: 1594 AD; Krogsta, Uppland, Sweden
- Discovered by: Johannes Bureus
- Present location: Krogsta near Tuna, Uppsala County, Sweden
- Rundata ID: U 1125
- Runemaster: Unknown

Text – Native
- mwsïeij / sïainaz

Translation
- [...] / stone

The Krogsta Runestone is a runestone designated as U 1125 in the Rundata catalog. The stone is located in Krogsta near Tuna, in Uppsala Municipality, Sweden, in the historic province of Uppland. It was first described by Johannes Bureus in 1594.

== Stone ==
The runestone is granite, 170 centimetres (5 ft 7 in) tall, and dated to 549–725. Four fragments presumed to be associated with the stone surround it. It is located in a former cemetery and was described by Johannes Bureus in 1594 and by Johannes Haquini Rhezelius in his Monumenta Uplandica in the mid-17th century.

== Inscription and decoration ==
Alongside a drawing of a man with outstretched hands, it bears an Elder Futhark inscription, reading ᛗᚹᛊᛇᛖᛁᛃ mwsïeij (uninterpretable). On the right face is an additional ᛊᛇᚨᛁᚾᚨᛉ sïainaz, probably for Proto-Norse stainaz "stone". The inscription has been interpreted as a "spelling lesson", distinguishing vocalic and consonantal forms for the semi-vowels j and w, and as magical.

The drawing has been described as "naively formed"; the man's gesture of upraised arms with fingers outspread has been interpreted as indicating prayer and as warding off danger, and related to figures on bronze horse mounts from the cemetery at Marchélepot and runestone U Fv1946;258 at Fällbro in Täby Municipality, which is dated to c. 1000.

== See also ==
- List of runestones
