= Sandavágur =

Sandavágur Sandevåg
- village
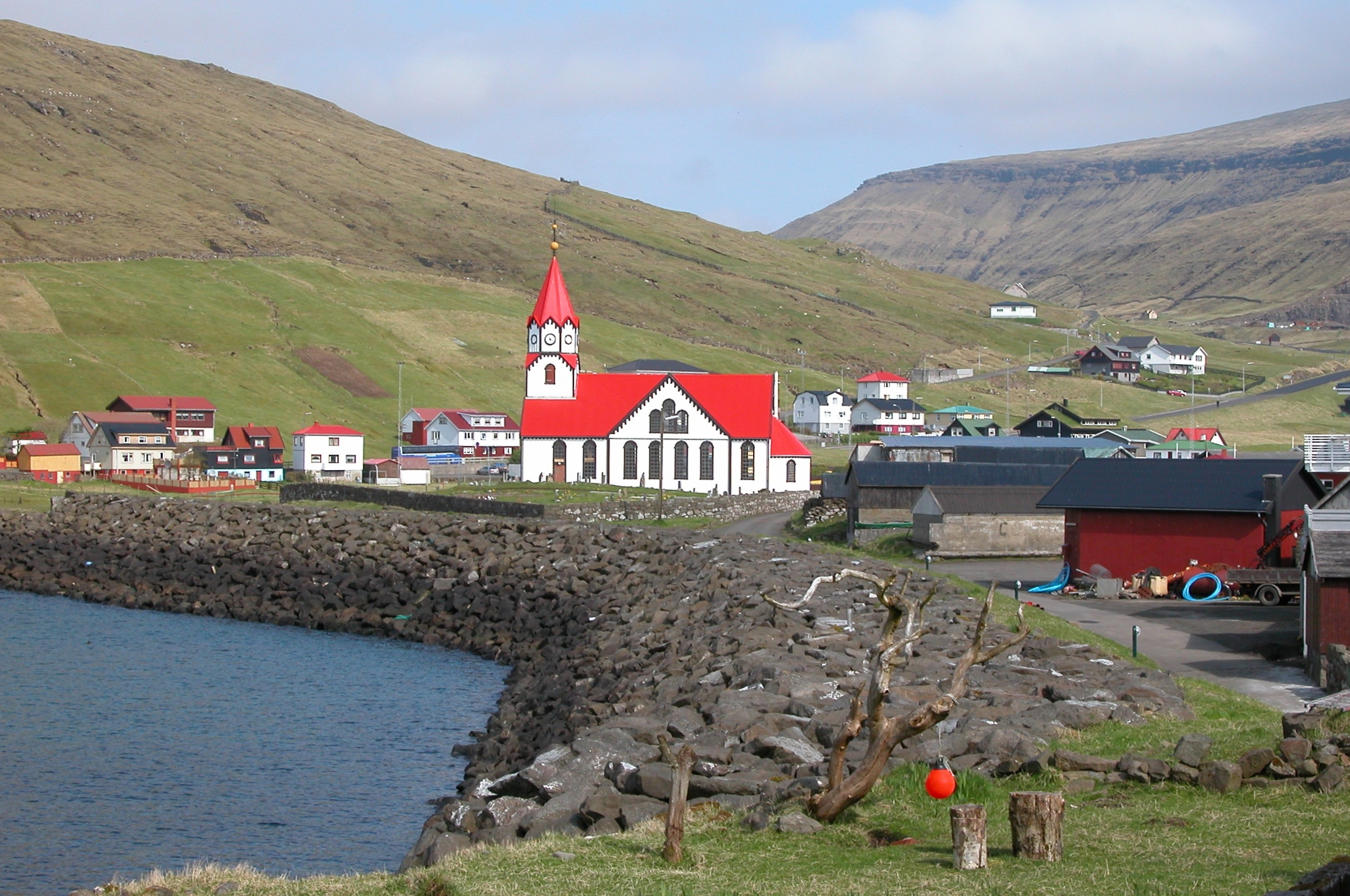
- Sandavágur
- Motto: kom!
- Location in the Faroe Islands
- Coordinates: 62°03′24″N 7°9′15″W
- State: Kingdom of Denmark
- Constituent country: Faroe Islands
- Island: Vágar
- Municipality: Vágar Municipality

Population (September 2025)
  - Total: 1,015
- Time zone: GMT
  - Summer (DST): UTC+1 (EST)
- Postal code: FO 360
- Climate: Cfc

Sandavágur (Danish: Sandevåg) is a town on the south coast of the Faroese island of Vágar. The name Sandavágur means sandy bay and refers to the sandy beach which used to be much larger than present. From one point in Sandavágur you can get a view of all the southern islands in the Faroes. Sandavágur used to be a municipality until 1 January 2009, when it fused together with the neighbour village Miðvágur into the new Vágar municipality.

Data:

It is the site of the 13th center runic Sandavágur stone.

== Sports ==
The local football team was SÍF Sandavágur until they merged with MB Miðvágur to form FS Vágar in 1993. The merger collapsed in 2004 and the clubs separated again only for SÍF to become part of a newly formed club, 07 Vestur.match, a shock win over Austria in 1990, Torkil Nielsen, was born in Sandavágur.

== Notable people ==
- V. U. Hammershaimb (1819–1909) - founder of the Faroese written language.
- Torkil Nielsen, scorer of the first goal ever of the Faroe Islands national football team
- Samuel Jacob Sesanus Olsen (1904–1994) - teacher, writer and translator.

== Gallery ==
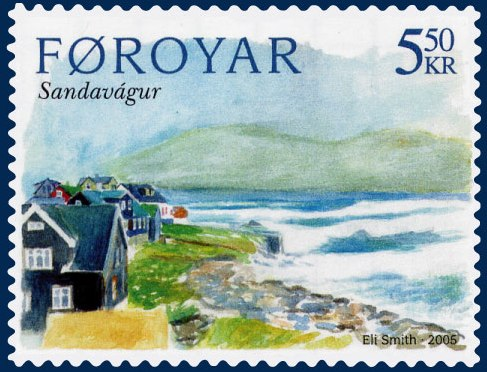
Sandavágur on a Faroese stamp

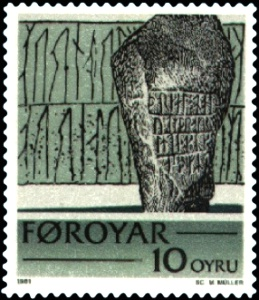
Sandavágur stone on a Faroese stamp

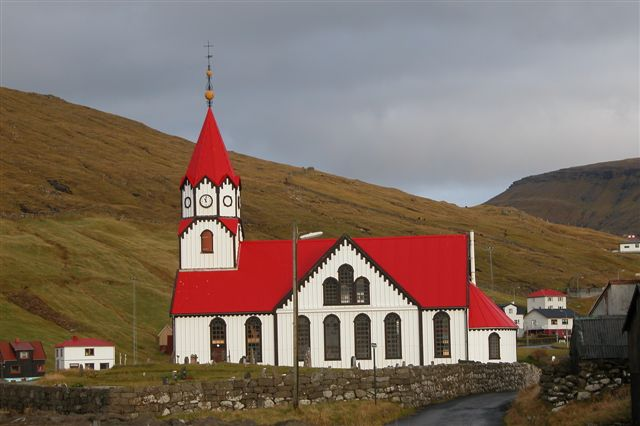
Sandavágur Church

== See also ==
- List of towns in the Faroe Islands
- Vágar
