= Eltang stone =

Runestone

Coordinates: 55.54°N 9.55°E

Eltang Stone
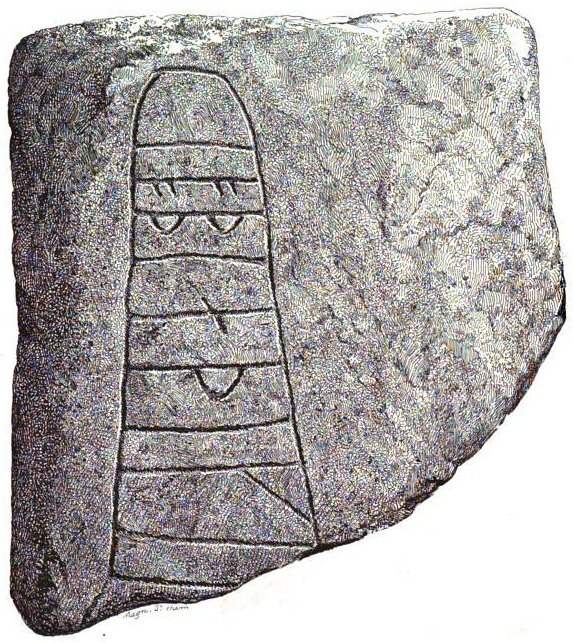
- Writing: Younger Futhark
- Created: Viking Age
- Discovered: c. 1866; Kolding, Southern Denmark, Denmark
- Discovered by: Mr. Flensbourg
- Present location: National Museum of Denmark
- Culture: Norse
- Rundata ID: DR 35

Text – Native
- ᛁ[ᛓ ͡ᛓᚦ ͡ᚦ]ᛁᛅᚦᛁᚴᛁ

Translation
- O Woden receive [thy servant] Woden!

The Eltang stone (also Stenderup stone, listed as DR 35 in the Rundata catalog (DK SJy 1), is a Viking Age runestone (now at the National Museum of Denmark, catalogue nr. D 52/1950). The stone was discovered in 1866 at North-Stenderup, Eltang parish, Kolding Municipality, Region of Southern Denmark, Denmark, about 2 km northeast of Kolding, on the estate of one Mr. Flensbourg, who gave it to the Oldnordisk Museum (which merged into the National Museum of Denmark in 1892).

The Danske Runeindskrifter database of the Copenhagen University's Nordisk Forskningsinstitut dates it to the later Viking Age (the range of AD 900-1200 cited as a "fairly safe" estimate).

It is a granite slab, measuring 66 cm high and 60 cm wide at a thickness between 4 and 10 cm. The lower right part of the slab is broken off, but the runic inscription is preserved in its entirety.

The inscription consists of nine runic horizontal staves, running top to bottom, enclosed in a frame. The Danske Runeindskrifter database reads i??iæþik?? (after Moltke (1985); transcribing the Younger Futhark ár rune ᛅ as æ).

The inscription is discussed in greater detail by George Stephens (1868). Stephens places it in the 9th century, i.e. the early phase of development of the Younger Futhark.

He interprets the five first staves as sam-staves, to be read as the same rune attached to the stave twice, and to be read twice, as it were

ᛁ	ᛓ	ᚦ	ᛁ	ᚿ	ᚦᛁᚴᛁ
ᛁ	ᛓ	ᚦ	ᛁ	ᚿ	ᚦᛁᚴᛁ

This results in a transcription of ᛁᛓᚦᛁᛅ ᚦᛁᚴᛁ ᛁᛓᚦᛁᛅ, read as ioþin þiki ioþin.

Stephens takes this as a reference to Woþin ("which in many dialects was softened to Oþin [...] I look upon the i as a Jutlandish prefix") and he translates "O Woden receive [thy servant] Woden!". He notes that (assuming his interpretation is correct) this is the first instance of the theonym Odin found recorded on a Scandinavian runestone.
