= Sørup runestone =

Complex runic inscription, debated as a cipher or Basque text

Coordinates: 55.6749°N 12.5756°E

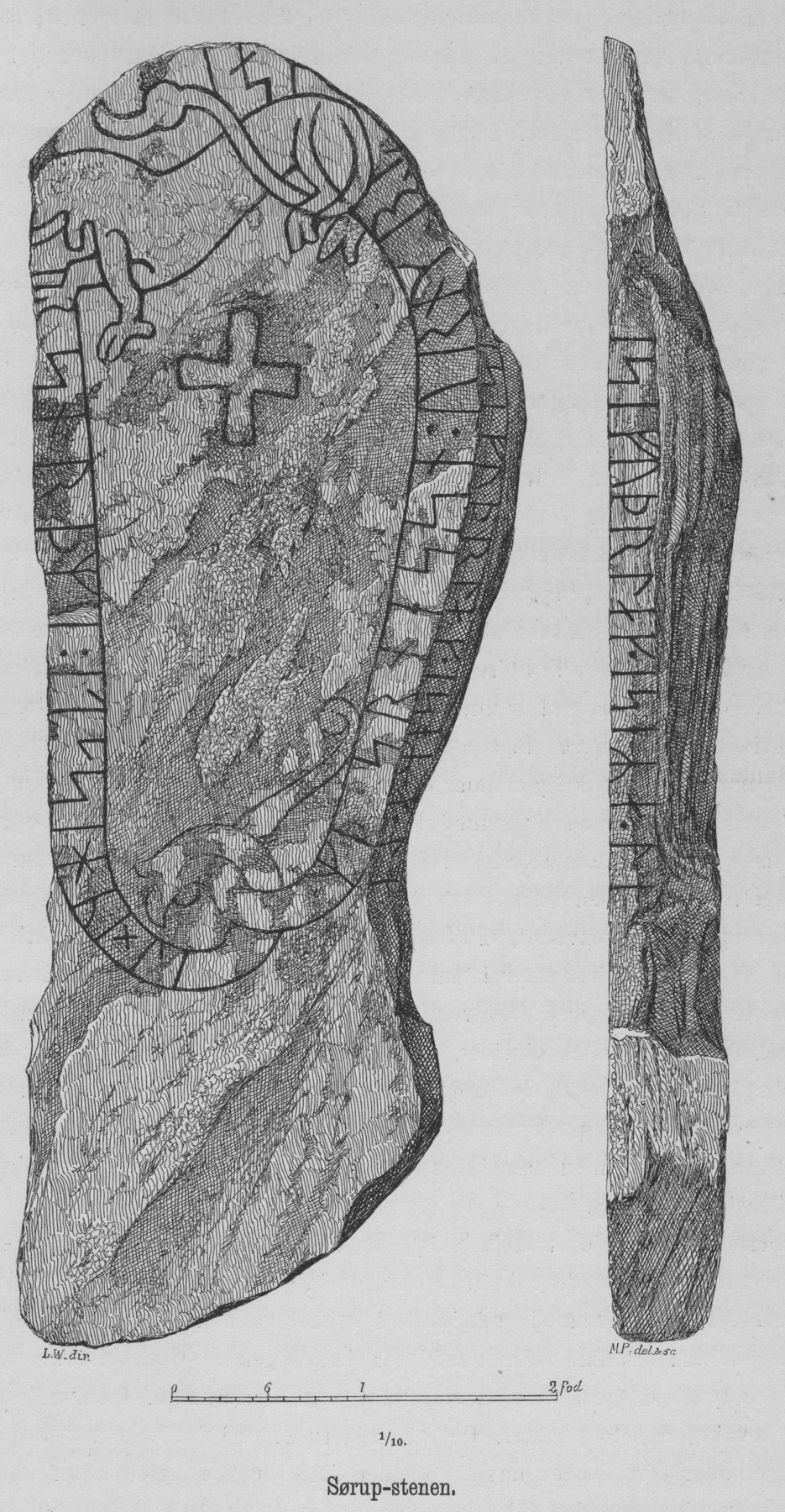
- Created: 1050-1250
- Discovered: Currently Copenhagen, originally Sørup, Currently Zealand, originally Funen, Denmark
- Rundata ID: DR 187

Text – Native
- See article.

Translation
- See article.

The Sørup runestone (Danish: Sørup-stenen) is a runestone from Sørup close by Svendborg on southern Funen in Denmark. The stone has a relatively long and very debated runic inscription, which has been seen as an unsolved cipher or pure nonsensical, but also has been suggested to be written in Basque.

== History and inscription ==
The age of the Sørup stone is uncertain, but it is thought to be from the period 1050–1250. The stone is made of granite and is approximately 2,14 meters tall, 75 cm broad and 22 cm thick. In written sources it is mentioned for the first time in 1589. In 1816 it was moved to Copenhagen, where it was placed by Rundetårn and later, in 1876, brought to the National Museum. Today it is not part of any exhibition, but is kept in the archive of the museum.

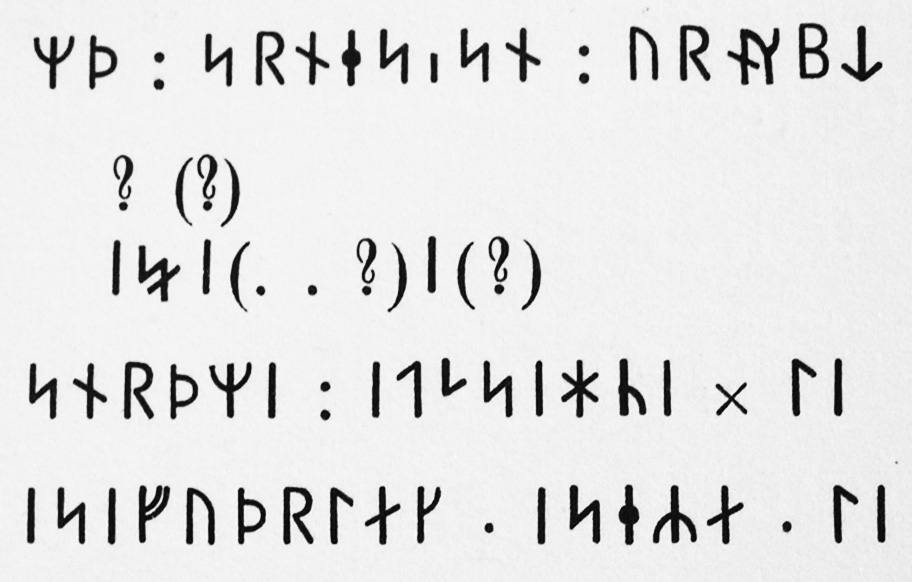
The runic signs of the Sørup stone presented in De danske runemindesmærker. Question marks represent damaged parts. Notice the two bind runes; the third from right at the upper line and the second from left at the middle line. Also notice the two final lines both ending with li. The author of De danske runemindesmærker, Ludvig Wimmer, thought that this pattern hardly could be incidental.

The Sørup runestone is decorated with a cross and an animal figure (possibly a lion) on the front, and has a runic inscription with some 50 runes, divided between two lines on the front and one line on one of the sides. Some of the runes are not found in the usual futhark and are thereby hard to interpret. Furthermore, there are two bind runes with uncertain reading order. Since parts of the stone are damaged, the reading is made even more difficult. A transliteration of the text can be:

Side A: m- : srnes-sn : urn=u=kb(h) | -a=si | s(n)rþmi : itcsih(k)i : li

Side B: isifuþrlak : iseya : li

== Non-lexical interpretation ==
The inscription of the Sørup stone is usually described as non-lexical, that is a text without semantic content. The runologist Ludvig Wimmer chose to make no transliteration of the signs of the Sørup stone in his book De danske runemindesmærker. Instead he only reproduced the appearance of the carvings, which has been interpreted to mean that he thought that the "text" itself did not have any meaning. Bæksted imagined that the carvings could be made by a "skilful but illiterate travelling (judging by the ornament: Swedish) sculptor, who did not want to miss the commission for a monument with an inscription made by an as illiterate art-lover in Funen." The web database Danske Runeindskrifter states that the Sørup stone "with its mixture of readable and dubious signs" gives "the impression of being a nonsensical inscription or an imitation of an inscription".

The equal distribution between vowels and consonants has been used as an argument against the non-lexical interpretation. The longest consonant cluster of the inscription is s(n)rþm. If an illiterate person randomly would have carved 50 runes, it is likely that there would have been more and longer accumulations of either vowels or consonants.

== Cipher hypothesis ==
It has been suggested that the Sørup inscription is encrypted, but the deciphering attempts that have been under taken (for example replacing each sign with the next rune in the futhark) have not given any meaningful results. Another hypothesis is that the text is so heavily abbreviated that it is impossible to recreate.

== Nordic and Latin interpretations ==
The philologist Fr. Orluf read the inscription as a heavily abbreviated Latin text starting with a few words in Old Danish. He began on side B, where he translated isifuþrlak : iseʀa with "*Isifa's Þorlak in *Sera". The segment isifu would then be the genitive case of the unattested name *Isifa, while *Sera would be an old form of the toponym Sørup. Orluf interpreted the segments li, which are found in the end of two of the lines, as an abbreviation for libera nos 'redeem us'. Both the Danish and Latin parts of this interpretation have been rejected by other runologists.

The linguist Rasmus Rask thought that it was possible to discern the Danish female name Signe at the end of side A, sih(k)i, but that the text otherwise was written in a grammatically corrupt language form. Wimmer questioned whether it was possible to read any word at all in that segment, but thought that in that case it was more likely to be the verb signe "bless" than a name.

== Basque interpretation ==
Professor emeritus Stig Eliasson has suggested that the text could be written in Basque. Unlike a dozen other European languages that he has compared it to, the Basque structure showed many similarities with the text of the Sørup stone. Eliasson's reading is presented in the table below.

Text fragment	mþ	•	s		r	nes	.s		n	:	urn	u	k	b(h)…	is	a	…	|	snrþmi	:	itcsihķi	×	li	isifuþrl	a	k	•	iseya	•	li
Function or meaning	aff.		pret. 3rd pers.	non-pres. ind.	causative prefix	verb root	dative flag	3rd pers. sing. dative	pret. ending		rune	proximal suffix	pl.	name?	patronymic suffix?	det.?	Ergative case ending?		husband + name?		surname		dative ending	name?	det.	ergative ending		aunt or *Izeba (name)		dative ending
Modern Basque equivalent	ba		z	e	ra	-	ts	o	n		errun	o	k	-	iz?	a?	k?		senar -		Etxehegi		ri	-	a	k		izeba		ri

With this analysis, the text would mean that someone (whose name is damaged; b(h)…isa…) let do/carve/cut (mþ•srnes.sn) these runes (urnuk) to her husband whose surname was Etxehegi (snrþmi : itcsihķi×li). On the side of the stone, an elliptical construction states that someone (isifuþrlak) did the same thing for his or her aunt or for someone with the unattested name Izeba (iseya•li). The interpretation agrees with both Basque grammar and vocabulary, and with the semantic content of many other memorial commemorative formulas of the Viking Age. A commemorative formula is a genre typical for runic inscriptions, where someone (in this case b(h)…isa… and isifuþrlak) did something (runes) to someone's honour or memory (the husband Etxehegi and an aunt or Izeba respectively). If the theory is correct it would mean that the oldest preserved relatively long text in Basque is kept in Denmark and is centuries older than the first book printed in Basque in year 1545.

Within popular science, the interpretation has generated translations such as "Basa let cut these runes to her husband Etxehegi, and Isifus to his aunt Izeba". However, parts of these translations, for example the names *Basa and *Isifus, do not find any support in Eliasson's articles. Neither does the part "aunt Izeba" has any foundation in the runic inscription, since iseya is either being interpreted as aunt or as a name, not as both.

=== Historic contacts between the Nordic countries and the Basque Country ===
A Basque reading of the Sørup stone presupposes Basque presence in Funen during the Middle Ages. However, there are no historical or archeological evidence for this, but in an appendix to his second article on the Sørup stone, Eliasson mentions some examples of Medieval connections between Northern and Southern Europe. Among other things, the discovery of 24 Spanish-Umayyad dirhams from around year 1000 at the island of Heligholmen outside of Gotland is mentioned. He also brings up the Vikings' capture of García Íñiguez of Pamplona in 861. According to the American journalist Mark Kurlansky, Basque sailors reached the Faroe Islands already in 875.

=== Critique ===
The reading has received mixed response. Apart from the difficulties that Eliasson brings up (for example the lack of a verb with the root *nes), there are few objections to the morphological analysis. Hellberg states that "methodically, one cannot show that a text is nonsense without trying to exhaust the possibilities of other readings". However, many reject the Basque reading on language-external grounds. For example, Quak writes that "even though Eliasson gives a precise and extensive foundation for his thesis, one still has difficulties with the assumption of such a distant foreign language in a Danish runic inscription." At the web database Danske Runeindskrifter the interpretation is described as "rather speculative" "because of objective reasonableness criteria and the lack of comparative material". Also Marco Bianchi, Ph.D. in Nordic languages, questions the "reasonableness of the assumption that a Basque inscription would show up in Funen". Instead, Bianchi maintains that the inscription of the Sørup stone most likely is non-lexical and thereby an example of the fascination that people felt for writing in a society where the majority were illiterates.
