= Fámjin stone =

Runestone in Fámjin Church, Faroe Islands

Coordinates: 61°31′33″N 6°52′49″W

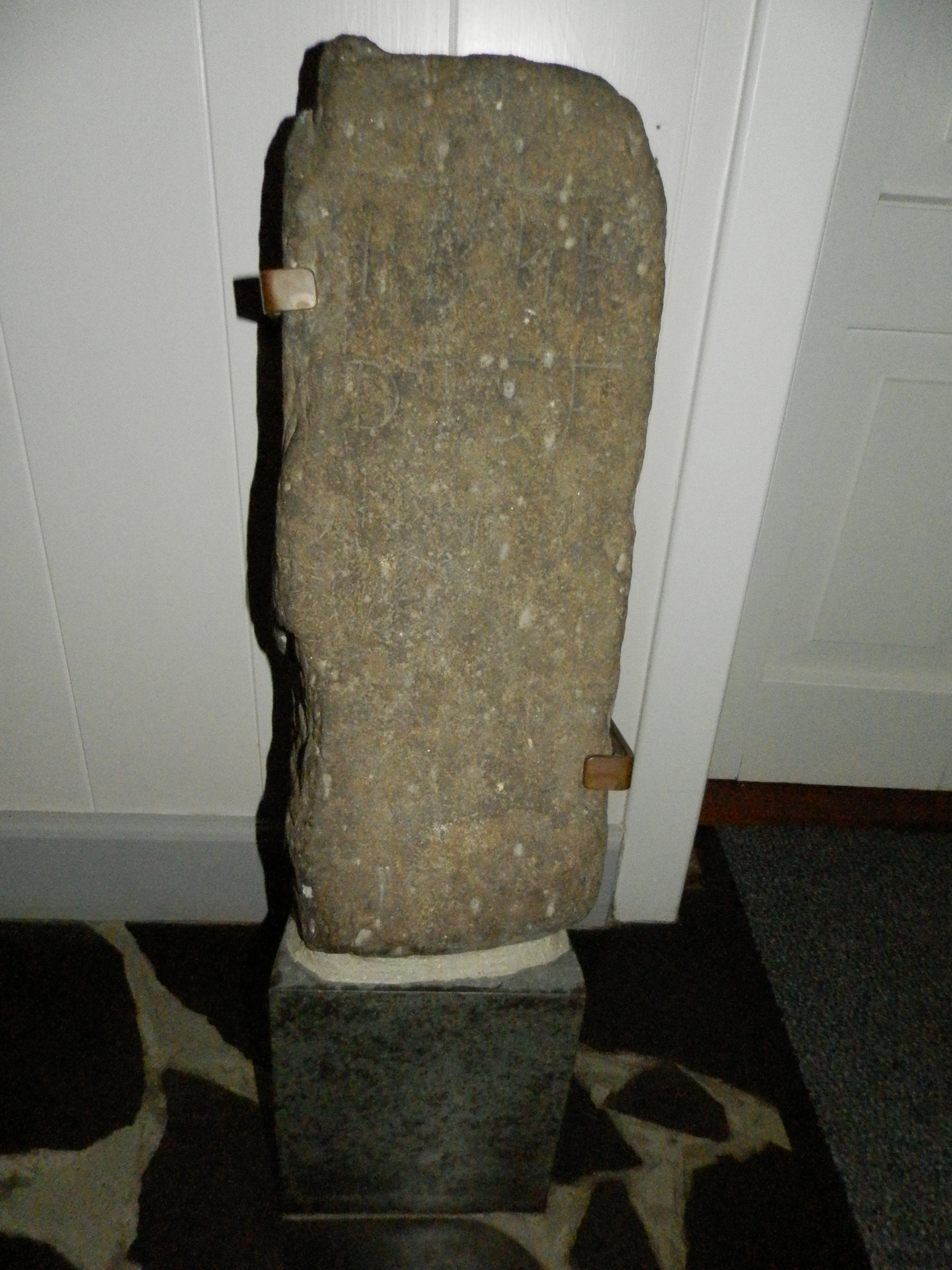
The Fámjin stone is located in the Church of Fámjin.

The Fámjin stone (Faroese: Fámjinssteinurin) is a runestone located in the church of Fámjin on the Faroe Islands. The stone bears both Latin and Runic letters. The stone is dated to the time after the Faroese reformation in 1538, and proves that runes were used up to as late as the 16th century. It is the youngest of the Faroese runestones.

== See also ==
- Sandavágur stone
- Kirkjubøur stone
