= Oddernes stone =

Coordinates: 58°09′34″N 08°00′48″E

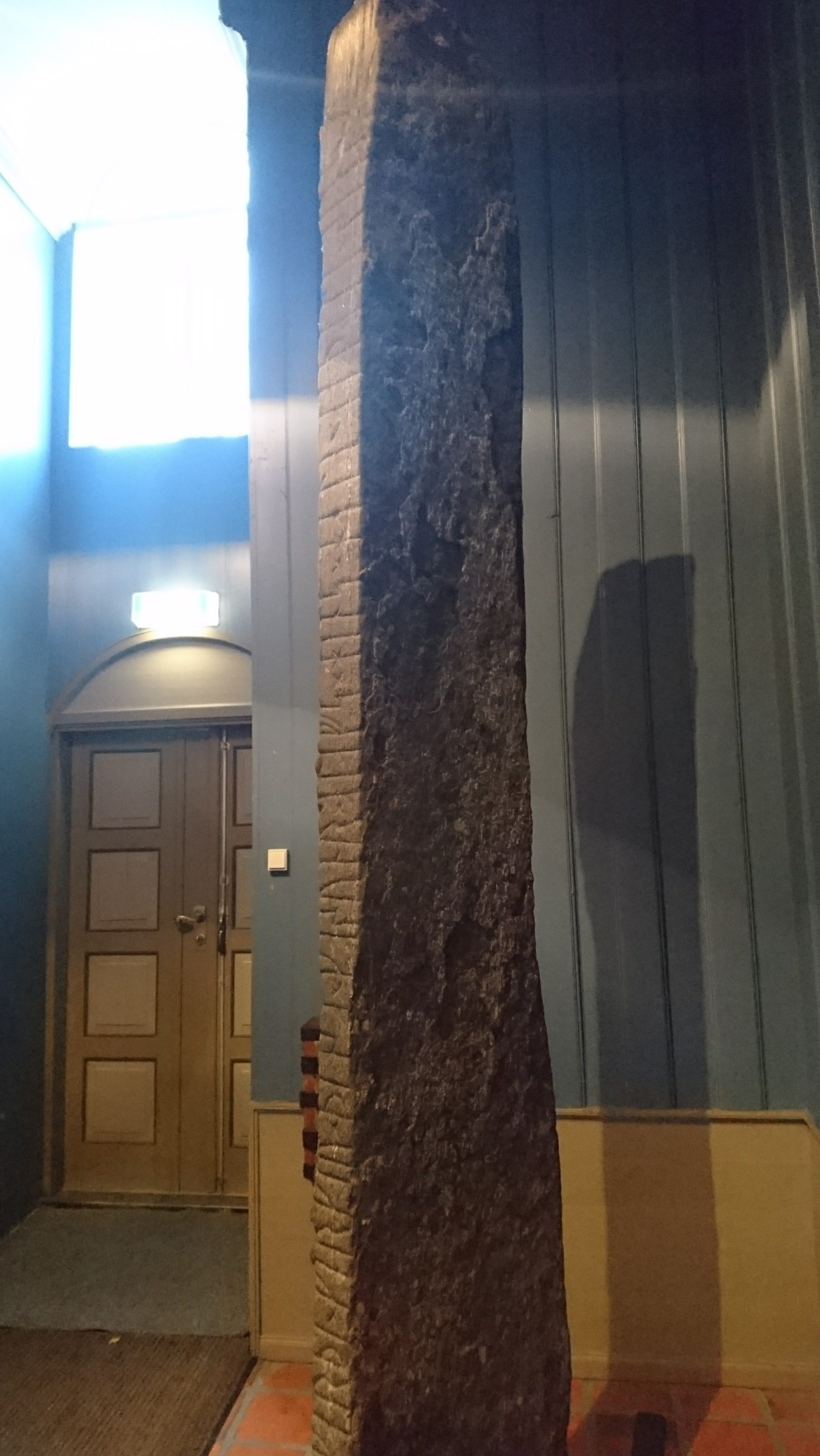
The Oddernes stone located in the church porch of Oddernes Church

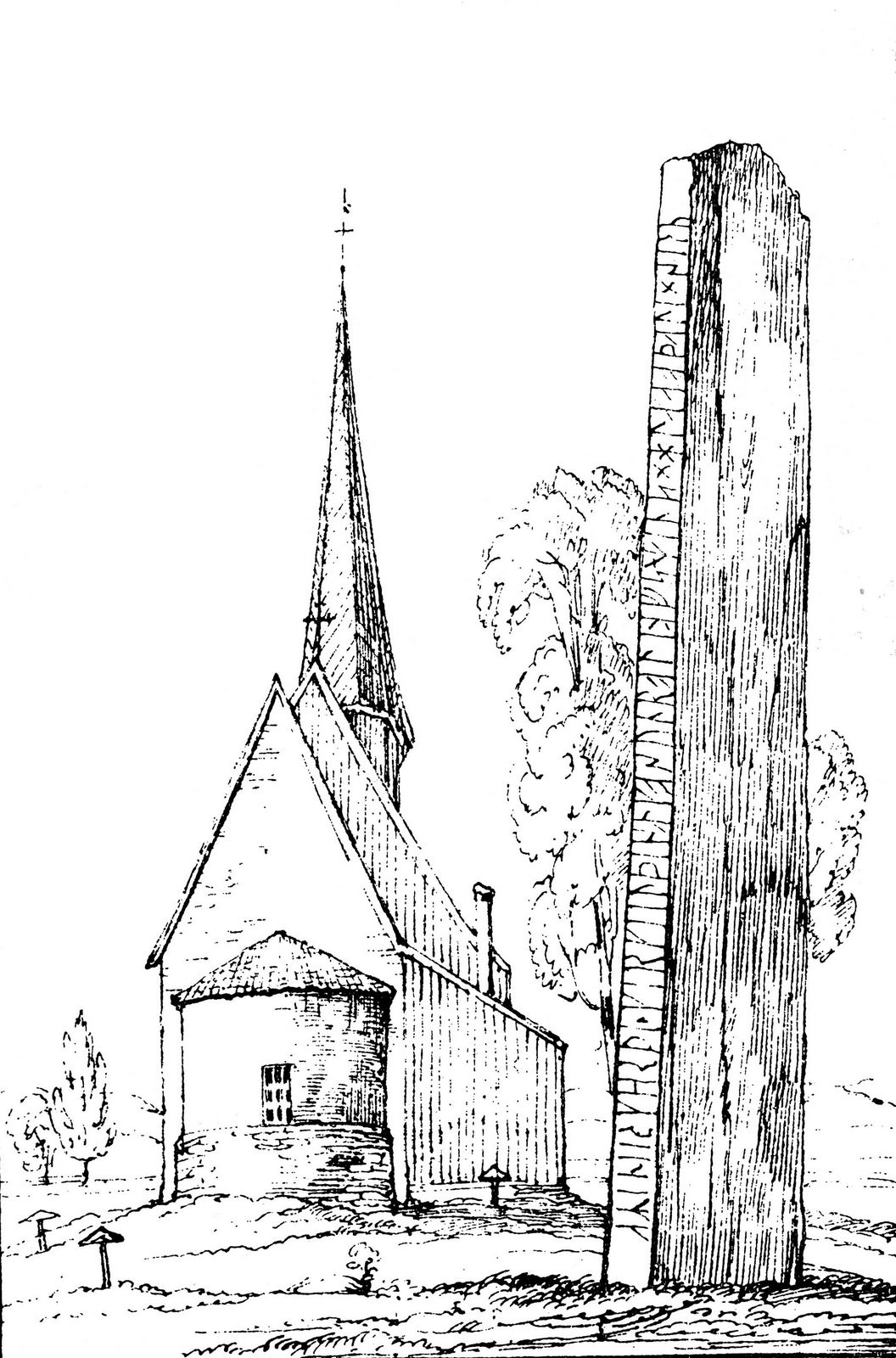
Drawing of the Oddernes stone at it prior location in the church cemetery

The Oddernes stone (Oddernessteinen) is a rune stone from Oddernes Church at Oddernes in Kristiansand, Vest-Agder, Norway. The stone was originally just in the church yard east of the church. In 1990 it was moved into the church porch.

== History ==
Oddernes stone was described in 1639 when the site was visited by Tomas Cortsen Wegner (1588-1654), Bishop of the Diocese of Stavanger. He had been commissioned by Ole Worm to provide inscriptions from rune stones located from within his diocese. Bishop Wegner gave a description of the stone with a drawing of the two inscriptions. Ole Worm was a Danish antiquarian who wrote a number of treatises on rune stones. He was at this time preparing his great work, Monumenta Danica. which was first published during 1643.

Both inscriptions are written with the younger runes and they are approx. dated to year 1030 and to 1040.

== Inscriptions ==
=== Inscription from 1030 ===
The first inscription (N209) is carved on one flat side of the stone, and is almost indistinguishable. It can be read (Old Norse into Latin letters):

....ur- (n)iriþs| |sun is| |st(a)in sa

This is interpreted as "... Neriðs son er steinn sá". In modern English: "After (NN) Neriðs' son is this stone," or "In memory of Tore Neridsson is this stone."

=== Inscription from 1040 ===
The second inscription on the narrow side of the stone (N210) is much longer and is much more startling:

aʀintr × karþi × kirkiu × þesa × kosunr × olafs × hins × hala × a oþali × sinu

Worm interpreted parts of this text, namely Olaf hins hala as "Olaf the saint" (St Olaf), and this is reproduced in Monumenta Danica..

== Subsequent interpretations ==
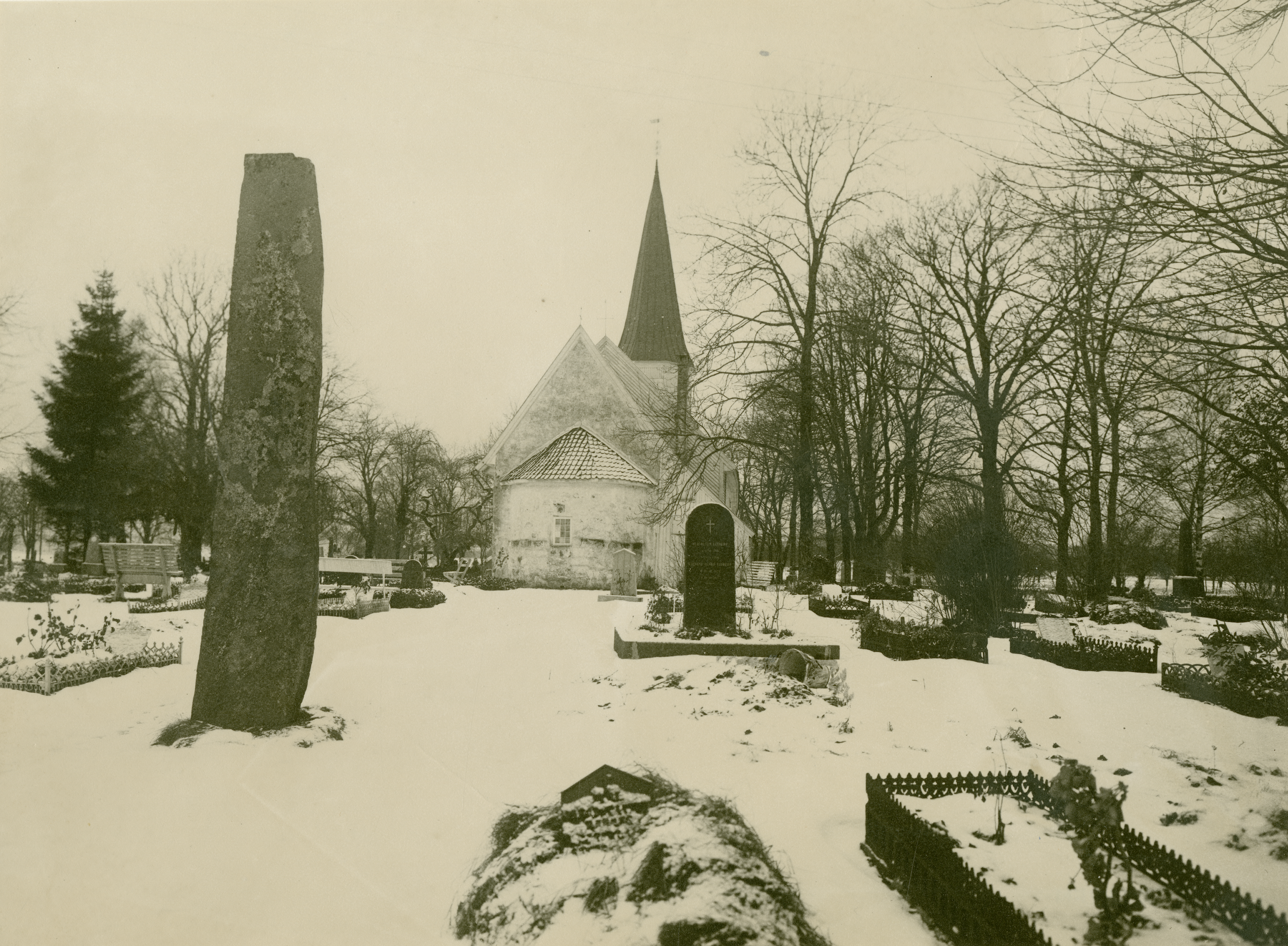
Former location of Oddernes stone

In 1805, Danish antiquarian and runologist Martin Friedrich Arendt (1769-1823) documented a number of rune inscriptions and other memorials in southern Norway. At Oddernes he gave a complete reading of the text: Eyvind gerði kirkiu þessa, guðsonr Olafs hin helga, à oðali sinu; modern English: "Eivind made this church, godson of St. Olaf, on his heir".

This interpretation has been accepted by a number of authorities including Sophus Bugge and Magnus Olsen. however others have interpreted the word hala differently, and believe it may have a different meaning than holy or saint. This would override the impression that St. Olaf had actually been present here. As a consequence, the interpretation of this inscription remains debatable.

== Other sources ==
- Spurkland, Terje (2005) Norwegian Runes and Runic Inscriptions (Boydell & Brewer) ISBN 9781843831860

== Related reading ==
- Sawyer, Birgit (2003) The Viking-Age Rune-Stones: Custom and Commemoration in Early Medieval Scandinavia (Oxford University Press) ISBN 978-0199262212
- Stocklund, Marie; et al., eds. (2006) Runes and Their Secrets: Studies in Runology (Copenhagen: Museum Tusculanum Press) ISBN 978-87-635-0627-4
