= Kirkjubøur stone =

Runestone in the Faroe Islands

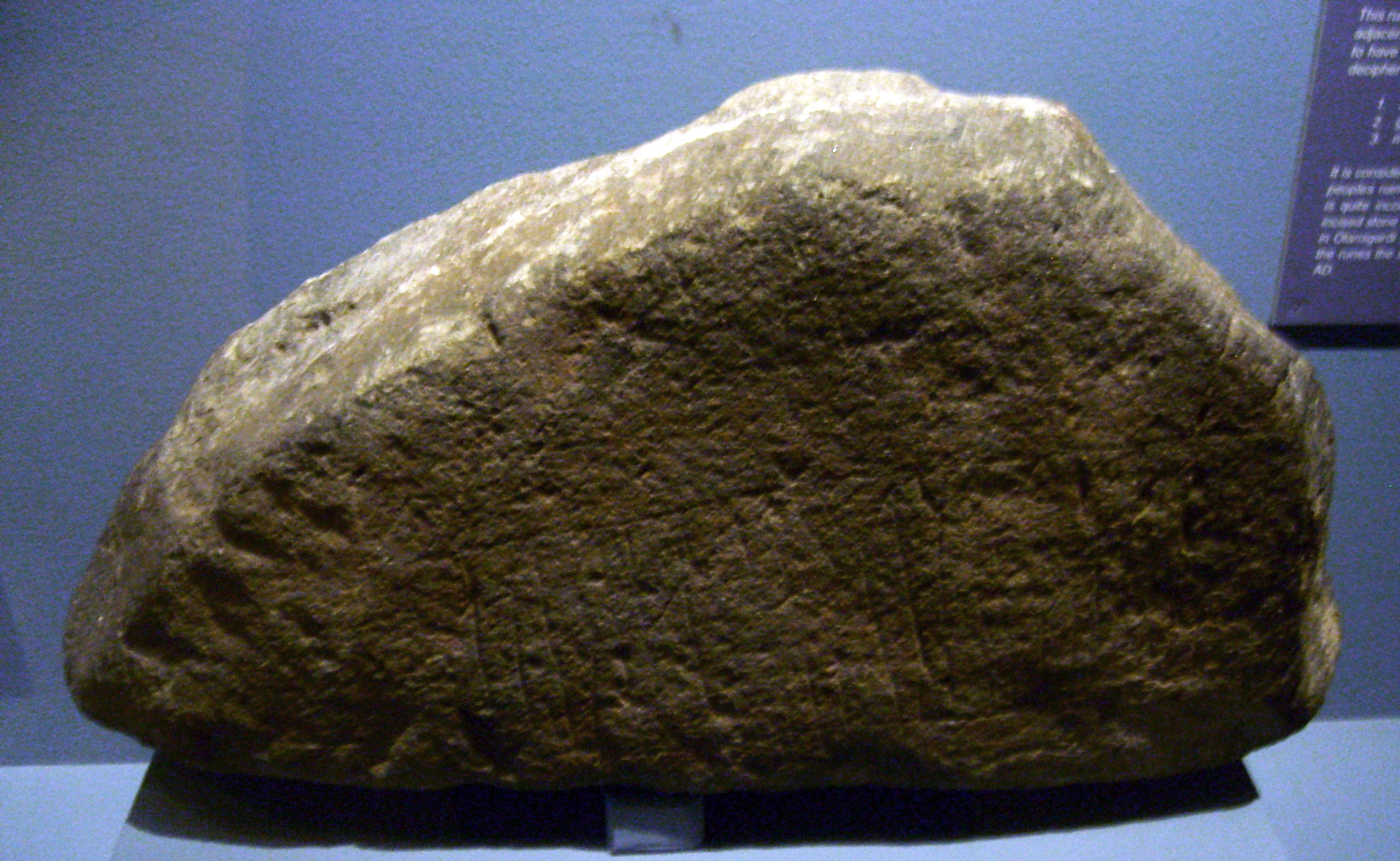
- The stone as displayed in the National Museum of the Faroe Islands
- Writing: Medieval runes
- Created: Viking Age
- Discovered: 1832 AD; Kirkjubøur, Faroe Islands
- Present location: Faroese National Museum
- Culture: Norse
- Rundata ID: FR 1

Text – Native
- Old Norse: ... ... Vígulfi(?) unni róa.

Translation
- ... ... may grant peace to Vígulf.

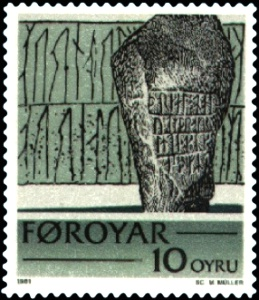
The Kirkjubøur inscription can be seen in the background. The stone in the foreground is the Sandavágur stone.

The Kirkjubøur stone (FR 1) is a runestone found in the Saint Olav's church in Kirkjubøur, Faroe Islands. It was discovered in 1832 and is dated to the Viking Age. Some state that it more specifically dates to the 9th century (probably about 865AD) and others that it dates from year 1000 CE.

Today it is housed at the National Museum of the Faroe Islands (Føroya Fornminnissavn) in Tórshavn together with other Faroese runestones.

== See also ==
- Sandavágur stone
- Fámjin stone
