= Grindheim stone =

Runestone in Vestland, Norway

Coordinates: 59.6698°N 6.0040°E

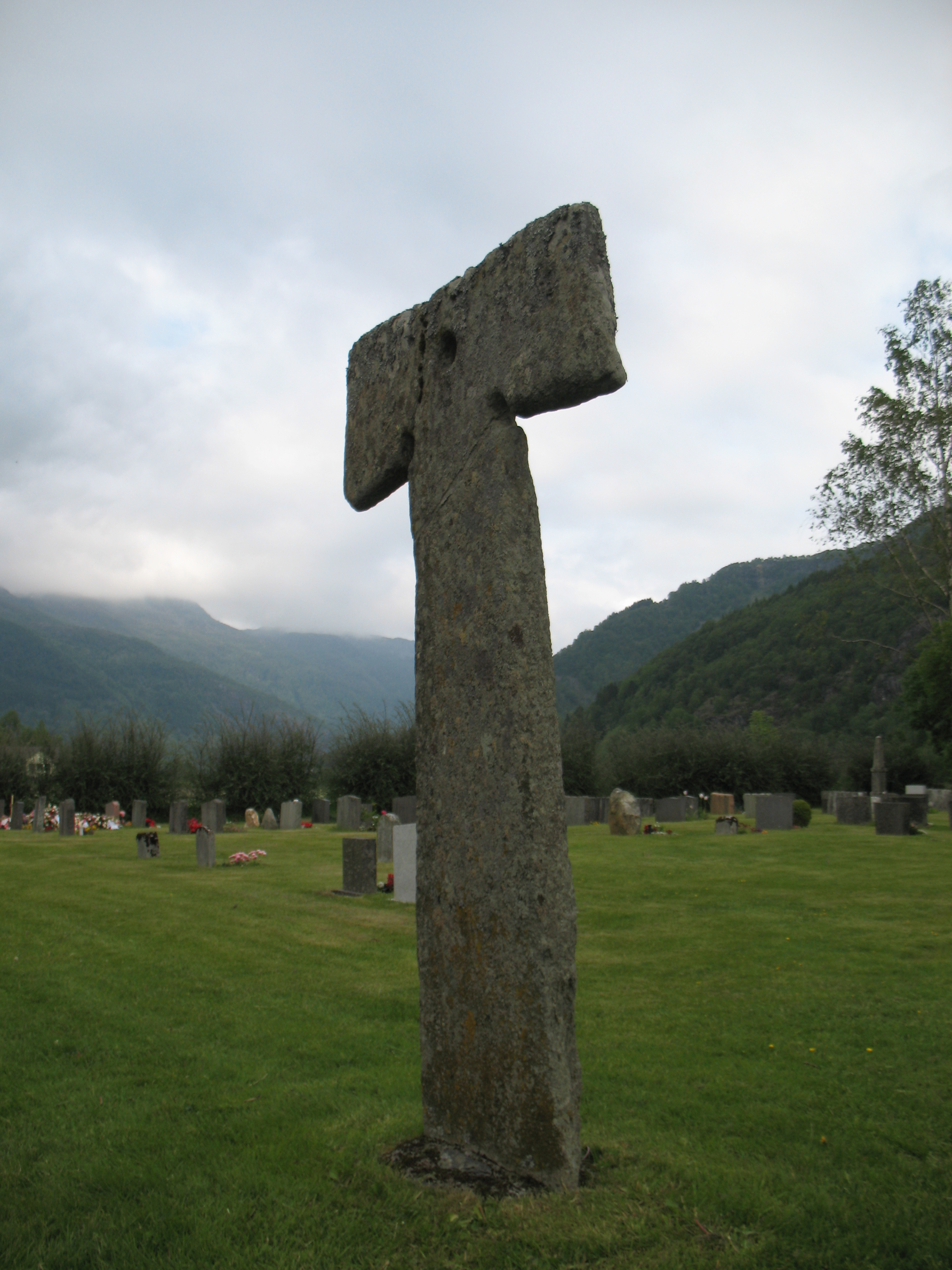
The Grindheim stone

The Grindheim stone (Norwegian: Grindheimsteinen) is a runestone from Grindheim Church in Etne Municipality in Vestland, Norway.

== History ==
The Vang stone was erected during the transitional period from Paganism to Christianity in Norway ca. 1000–1050, A.D. It is a memorial stone with a carved cross and runic inscription. The stone was first described in a letter from Nils Paaske, Bishop of the Diocese of Bjørgvin to Ole Worm in 1626. Bishop Paaske also provided a drawing of the inscription.

Ole Worm was a Danish antiquarian who wrote a number of treatises on rune stones. He was at this time preparing his great work, Monumenta Danica. which was first published during 1643.

Wilhelm Frimann Koren Christie reported in 1837 that the stone was then within the cemetery walls surrounding the church. The stone was examined by Oluf Rygh in 1866. In 1905 it was picked up from the wall and raised again to the north wall of the church.

== Runic Inscription ==
The runes date back to the middle or the end of the 11th century. The inscription is:

þormoþr:r(a)isti: st(a)in:þana
aftir:þormoþ:suiþanta:foþur:sin

In Old Norse:

Þormóðr reisti stein þenna eptir Þormóð svíðanda, fǫður sinn.

Translated to modern English: "Tormod rose up this stone after Tormod Svidende, his father".

== Other sources ==
- Sawyer, Birgit (2003) The Viking-Age Rune-Stones: Custom and Commemoration in Early Medieval Scandinavia (Oxford University Press) ISBN 978-0199262212
- Stocklund, Marie; et al., eds. (2006) Runes and Their Secrets: Studies in Runology (Copenhagen: Museum Tusculanum Press) ISBN 978-87-635-0627-4
