= Sandavágur Church =

Church in the Faroe Islands

Coordinates: 62.0538°N 7.1515°W

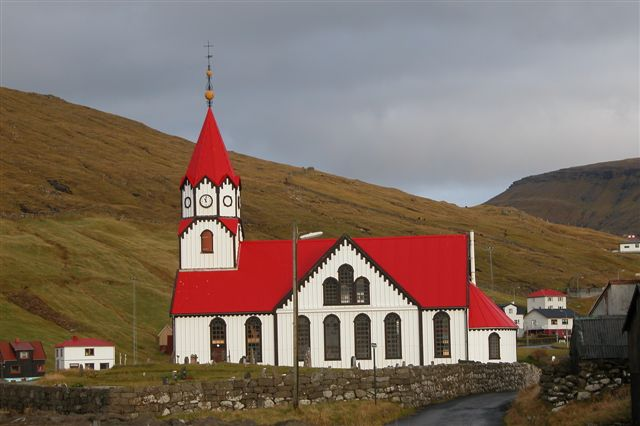
Church of Sandavágur, Oct 2005

Sandavágur Church (Faroese: Sandavágs kirkja; Danish: Sandevåg Kirke) is a distinctive red-roofed church in the town of Sandavágur in the Faroe Islands.

== History ==
The church of Sandavá was consecrated on 29 April 1917. It was the fifth in a series of churches built in the last 300 years.

A memorial was erected outside the church to one of the many ships that were sunk during the Second World War.
