= Stangeland stone =

Viking Age runestone in Norway

Coordinates: 58.85°N 5.71027777777778°E

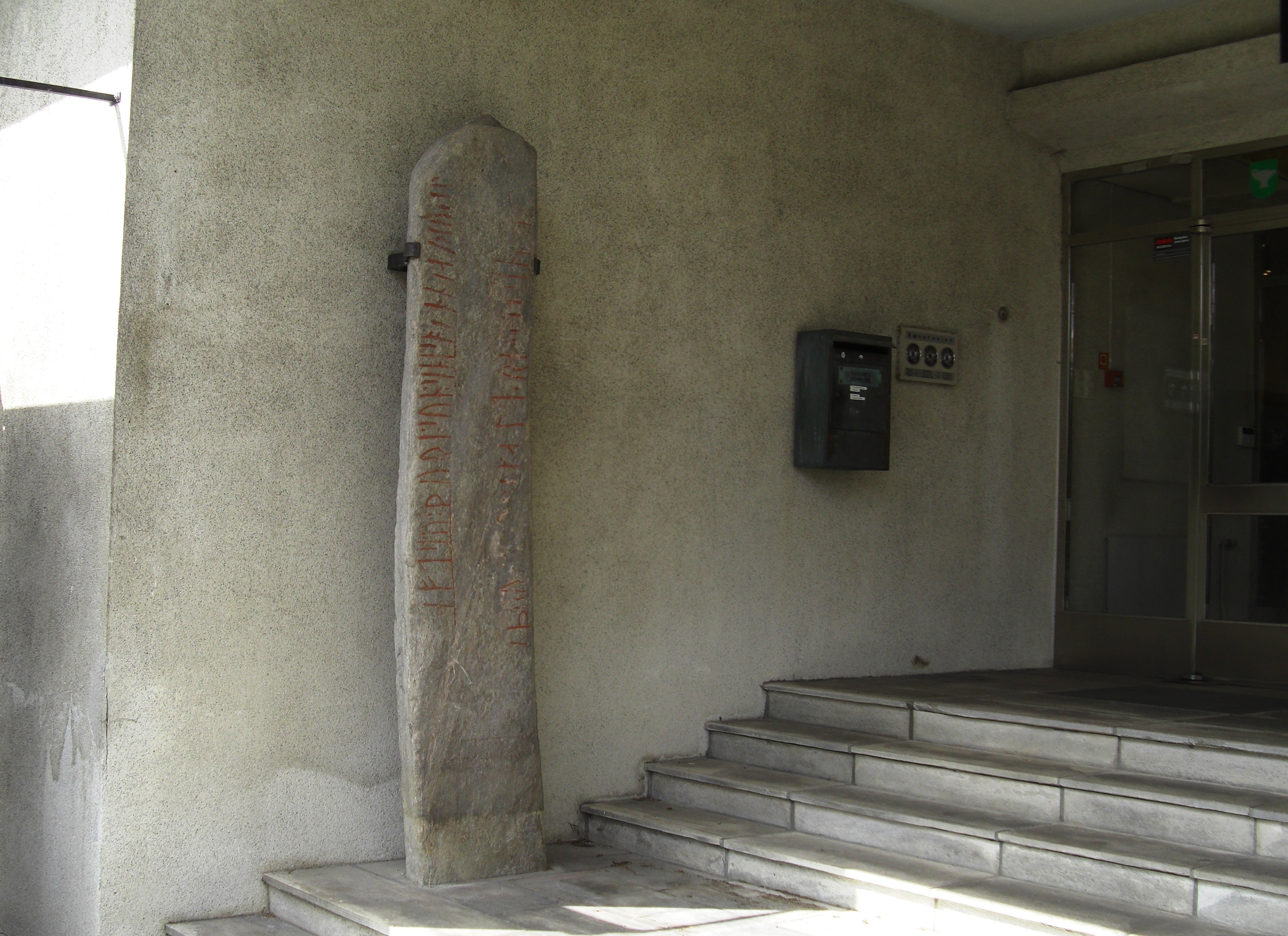
N 239

The Stangeland stone or N 239 is a Viking Age runestone engraved in Old Norse with the Younger Futhark runic alphabet in Stangeland, Norway, and the style of the runestone is the runestone style RAK. It was found on Stangeland Farm, where it has been moved several times and for many years was used as a bridge over a river.

== Inscription ==
þur(b)(i)(u)(r)(n) : skalt : ra(i)sti s(t)n (þ)(o)n(a) aft : s(o)i-÷þuri : sun : sin : is o : (t)on(m)arku (:) (f)il
Þorbjǫrn {} Skald {} reisti stein þenna ept {} <soi->þóri, {} son {} sinn, {} er á {} Danmǫrku {} fell.
"Þorbjôrn Skald raised this stone in memory of <soi->þórir, his son, who fell in Denmark."
