= Geography of the Faroe Islands =

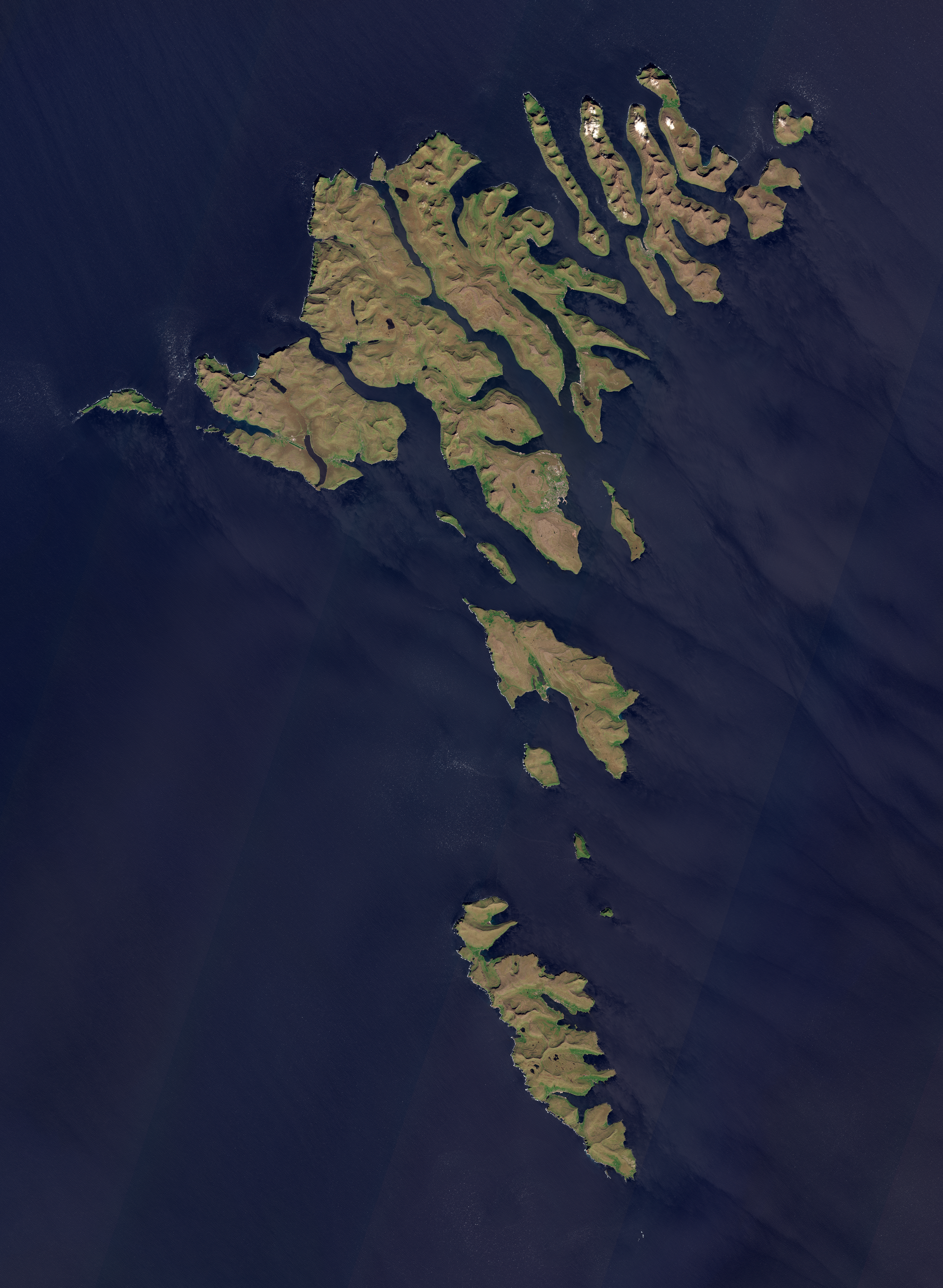
Satellite image of the Faroe Islands

The Faroe Islands are an island group consisting of eighteen islands between the Norwegian Sea and the North Atlantic, about half-way between Iceland and Norway. Its coordinates are 62°N 7°W. It is 1,393 square kilometres in area, and includes small lakes and rivers, but no major ones. There are 1,117 kilometres of coastline, and no land boundaries with any other country.

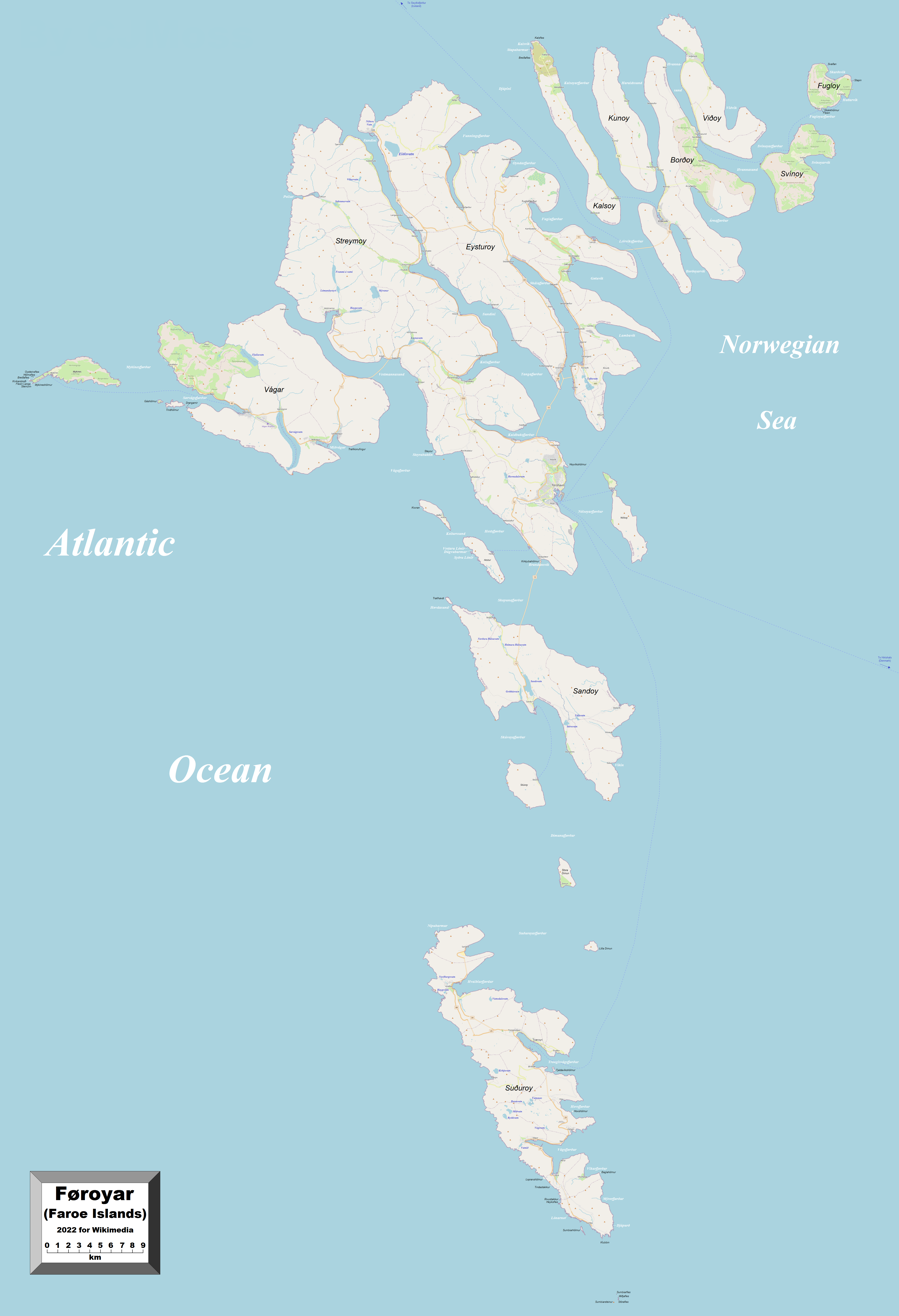
Detailed map of the Faroe Islands

The Faroe Islands generally have cool summers and cool to cold winters, with a usually overcast sky and frequent fog and strong winds. Although at a high latitude, due to the Gulf Stream their climate is ameliorated. The islands are rugged and rocky with some low peaks; the coasts are mostly bordered by cliffs. The Faroe Islands are notable for having the highest sea cliffs in Europe, and some of the highest in the world otherwise. The lowest point is at sea level, and the highest is at Slættaratindur, which is 882 metres above sea level. The landscape made roadbuilding difficult, and only recently has this been remedied by building tunnels.

Many of the Faroese islands tend to be elongated in shape. Natural resources include fish and hydropower.

== Statistics ==
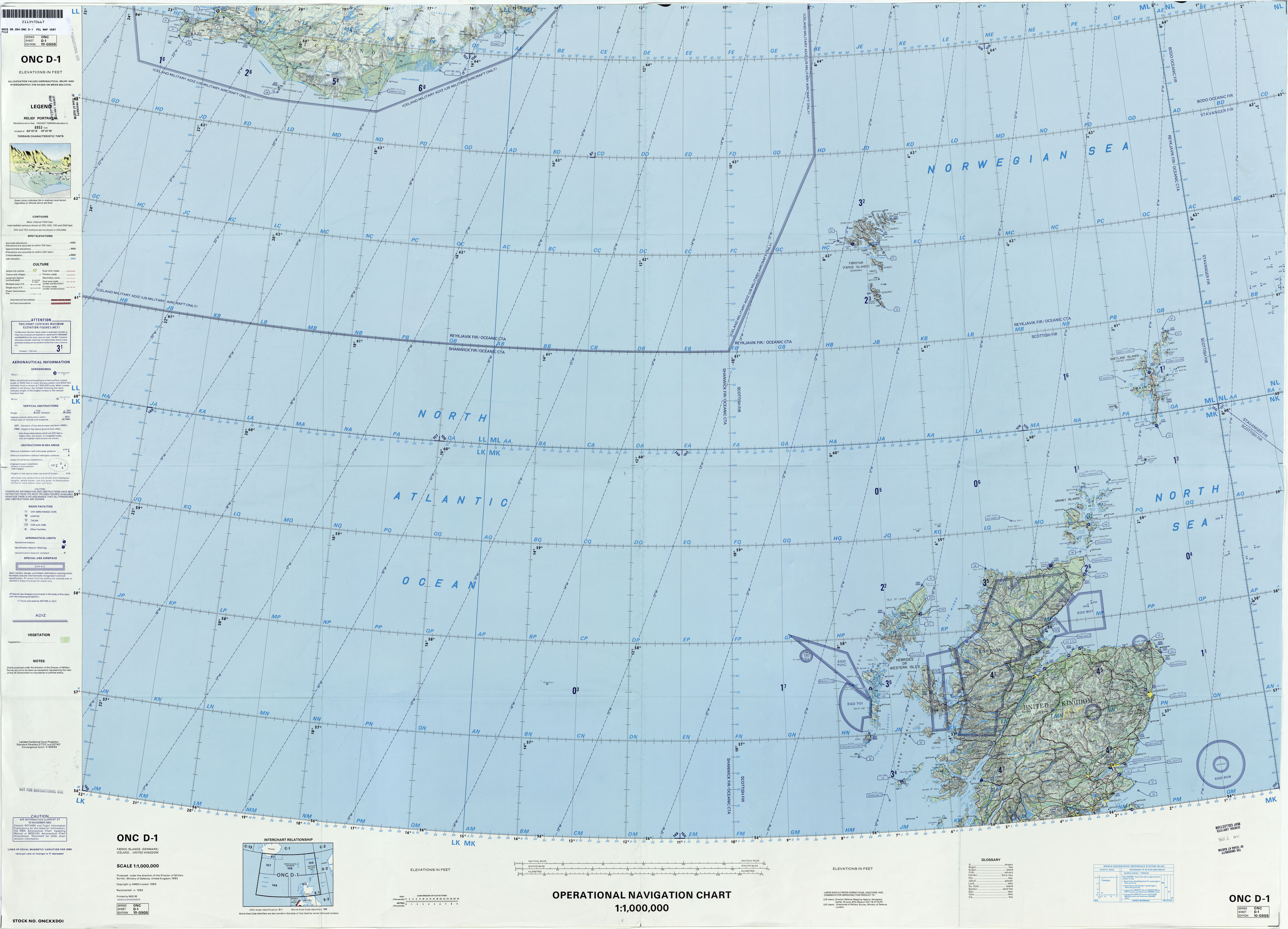
Map including the Faroe Islands

Geographic coordinates
- 62°00′N 06°47′W
- North: Enniberg, 62°29′,2 N
- South: Sumbiarsteinur, 61°21′,6 N
- West: Gáadrangur, 7°40′,1 W
- East: Stapin, 6°21′,5 W
Area
- Land: 1,393 km²
- Water: 7.19 km² (the area includes 10 of the largest lakes. There are a number of smaller lakes and streams.)
Land boundaries
0 km
Coastline
1,117 km
Maritime claims
- Territorial sea: 3 nmi (5.6 km; 3.5 mi)
- Continental shelf: 200 nmi (370.4 km; 230.2 mi) or agreed boundaries or median line
- Exclusive economic zone: 200 nmi (370.4 km; 230.2 mi) or agreed boundaries or median line
Climate
Subarctic oceanic climate (Köppen climate classification Cfc) moderated by North Atlantic Current; long, mild, windy winters; short, cool summers, damp in the South and West. Arctic climate (Köppen ET) in some mountains.
Terrain
Rugged, rocky, some low peaks; cliffs along most of coast. The coasts are deeply indented with fjords, and the narrow passages between islands are agitated by strong tidal currents. Multiple sea stacks exist along the coast.
Elevation extremes
- Lowest point: Atlantic Ocean 0 m
- Highest point: Slættaratindur 880 m
Natural resources
Fish, whales, hydropower, wind, possible petroleum and natural gas
Land use
- Arable land: 2.14%
- Permanent crops: 0%
- Other: 97.86% (2012)
Environment—international agreements
Marine dumping

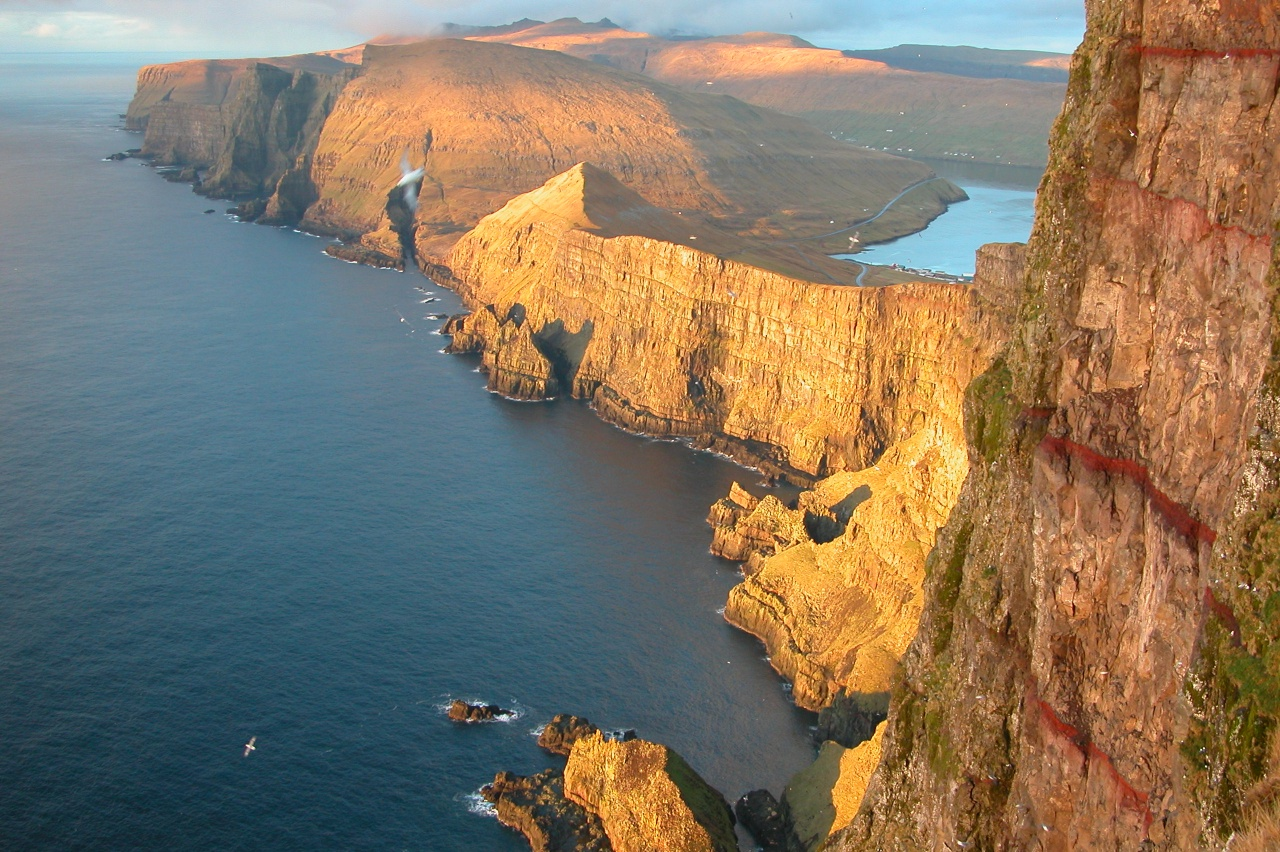
View of the west coast of Suðuroy

== Climate ==
The climate is classed as subpolar oceanic climate (Köppen climate classification Cfc), with areas having a tundra climate, especially in the mountains, although some coastal or low-lying areas may have very mild-winter versions of a tundra climate. The overall character of the climate of the islands is influenced by the strong warming influence of the Atlantic Ocean, which produces the North Atlantic Current. This, together with the remoteness of any source of landmass-induced warm or cold airflows, ensures that winters are mild (mean temperature 3.0 to 4.0 °C or 37 to 39 °F) while summers are cool (mean temperature 9.5 to 11.2 °C or 49 to 52 °F).

The islands are windy, cloudy and cool throughout the year with an average of 210 rainy or snowy days per year. The islands lie in the path of depressions moving northeast, making strong winds and heavy rain possible at all times of the year. Sunny days are rare and overcast days are common. Hurricane Faith struck the Faroe Islands on 5 September 1966 with sustained winds over 100 mph (160 km/h) and only then did the storm cease to be a tropical system.

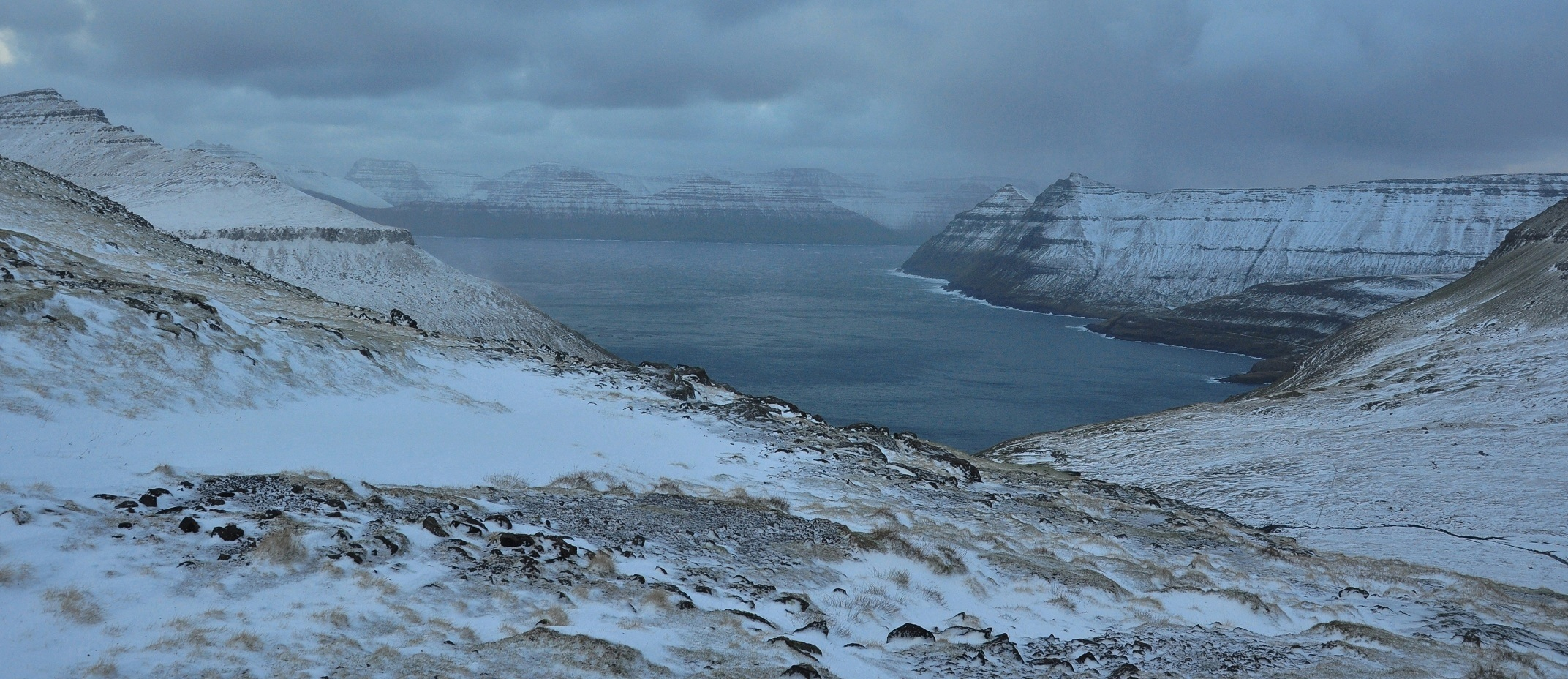
An October evening on Eysturoy

Due to the altitude, ocean currents, topography, and winds, the islands exhibit a variety of microclimates. Precipitation varies considerably throughout the archipelago. In some highland areas, snow cover may last for months with snowfalls possible for the greater part of the year (on the highest peaks, summer snowfall is by no means rare), while in some sheltered coastal locations, several years pass without any snowfall whatsoever.

Climate data for Tórshavn (1991–2020, extremes 1961–2021)
Month	Jan	Feb	Mar	Apr	May	Jun	Jul	Aug	Sep	Oct	Nov	Dec	Year
Record high °C (°F)	11.6 (52.9)	13.0 (55.4)	12.3 (54.1)	18.3 (64.9)	19.7 (67.5)	20.0 (68.0)	20.2 (68.4)	22.0 (71.6)	19.5 (67.1)	16.3 (61.3)	14.7 (58.5)	13.2 (55.8)	22.0 (71.6)
Mean daily maximum °C (°F)	6.2 (43.2)	6.0 (42.8)	6.4 (43.5)	7.6 (45.7)	9.3 (48.7)	11.3 (52.3)	12.9 (55.2)	13.3 (55.9)	11.9 (53.4)	9.6 (49.3)	7.6 (45.7)	6.5 (43.7)	9.0 (48.2)
Daily mean °C (°F)	4.3 (39.7)	4.0 (39.2)	4.3 (39.7)	5.4 (41.7)	7.1 (44.8)	9.1 (48.4)	10.7 (51.3)	11.1 (52.0)	10.0 (50.0)	7.8 (46.0)	5.8 (42.4)	4.5 (40.1)	7.0 (44.6)
Mean daily minimum °C (°F)	2.1 (35.8)	1.6 (34.9)	2.1 (35.8)	3.2 (37.8)	5.0 (41.0)	7.3 (45.1)	9.1 (48.4)	9.3 (48.7)	8.1 (46.6)	5.7 (42.3)	3.6 (38.5)	2.2 (36.0)	4.9 (40.8)
Record low °C (°F)	−8.8 (16.2)	−11.0 (12.2)	−9.2 (15.4)	−9.9 (14.2)	−3.0 (26.6)	0.0 (32.0)	1.5 (34.7)	1.5 (34.7)	−0.6 (30.9)	−4.5 (23.9)	−7.2 (19.0)	−10.5 (13.1)	−11.0 (12.2)
Average precipitation mm (inches)	164.5 (6.48)	128.1 (5.04)	127.8 (5.03)	91.2 (3.59)	68.4 (2.69)	62.3 (2.45)	70.1 (2.76)	91.8 (3.61)	116.3 (4.58)	145.0 (5.71)	151.8 (5.98)	154.4 (6.08)	1,359.5 (53.52)
Average precipitation days (≥ 0.1 mm)	26	23	26	22	19	18	19	20	23	26	26	27	273
Average snowy days	8.3	6.6	8.0	4.4	1.5	0.0	0.0	0.0	0.1	1.4	5.5	8.2	44.0
Average relative humidity (%)	89	88	88	87	87	88	89	90	89	89	88	89	88
Mean monthly sunshine hours	14.5	36.7	72.8	108.6	137.8	128.6	103.6	100.9	82.7	53.4	21.1	7.8	868.2
Source: Danish Meteorological Institute (humidity 1961–1990, precipitation days 1961–1990, snowy days 1961–1990), infoclimat.fr (record high)

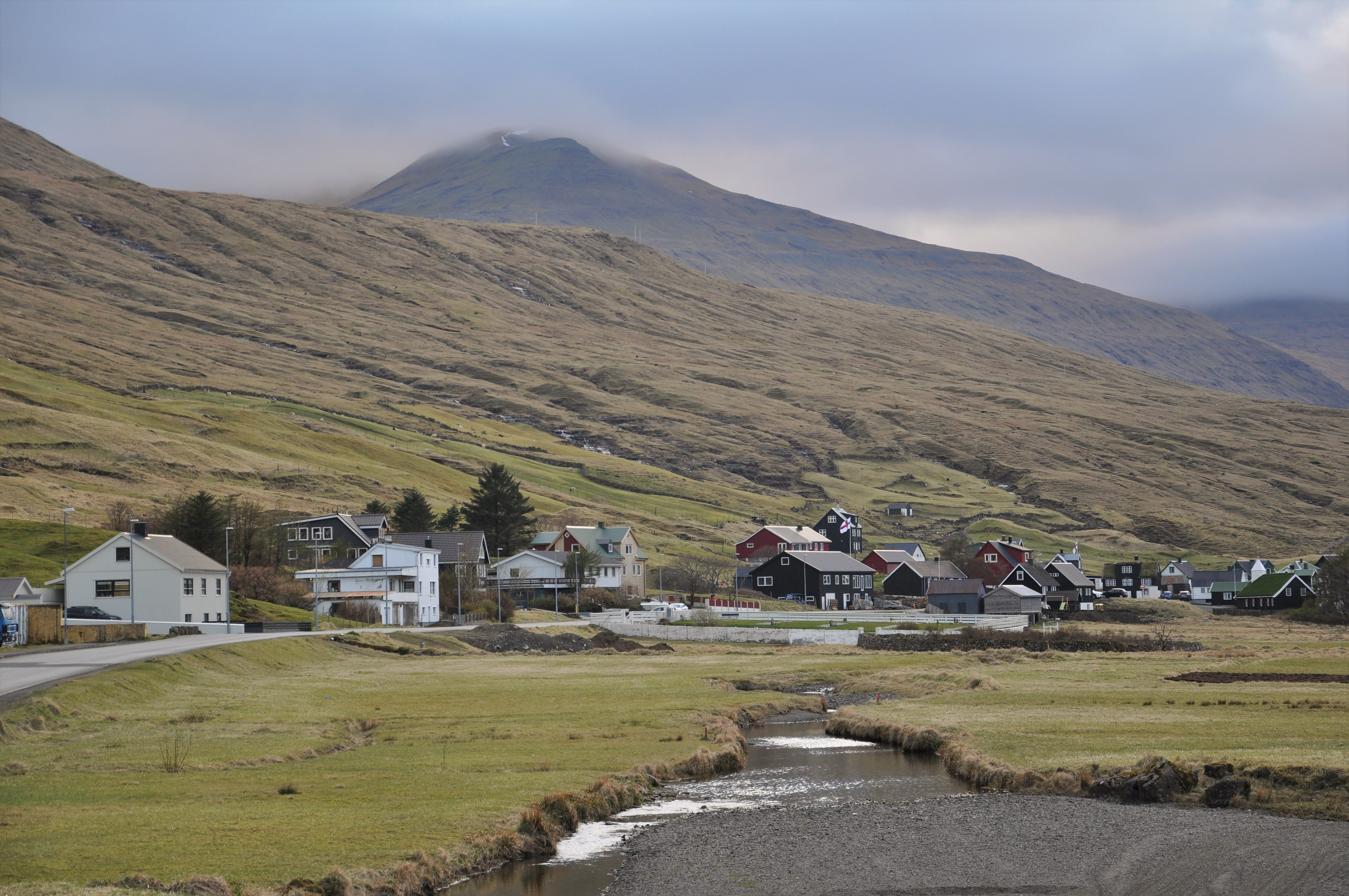
Hvalvik, Streymoy island, April 2022

Tórshavn receives frosts more often than other areas just a short distance to the south. Snow is also seen at a much higher frequency than outlying islands nearby. The area receives on average 49 frosts a year.

Climate data for Mykines, 105 m.a.s.l.
Month	Jan	Feb	Mar	Apr	May	Jun	Jul	Aug	Sep	Oct	Nov	Dec	Year
Record high °C (°F)	9.0 (48.2)	9.5 (49.1)	10.0 (50.0)	12.5 (54.5)	13.0 (55.4)	15.0 (59.0)	16.0 (60.8)	16.0 (60.8)	14.0 (57.2)	11.5 (52.7)	10.6 (51.1)	9.5 (49.1)	16.0 (60.8)
Mean daily maximum °C (°F)	5.1 (41.2)	5.1 (41.2)	5.2 (41.4)	6.6 (43.9)	8.0 (46.4)	10.2 (50.4)	10.9 (51.6)	11.3 (52.3)	10.2 (50.4)	8.8 (47.8)	6.0 (42.8)	4.9 (40.8)	7.7 (45.9)
Daily mean °C (°F)	3.5 (38.3)	3.5 (38.3)	3.5 (38.3)	4.8 (40.6)	6.2 (43.2)	8.5 (47.3)	9.2 (48.6)	9.6 (49.3)	8.7 (47.7)	7.4 (45.3)	4.6 (40.3)	3.3 (37.9)	6.1 (43.0)
Mean daily minimum °C (°F)	1.7 (35.1)	1.5 (34.7)	1.5 (34.7)	3.0 (37.4)	4.7 (40.5)	7.1 (44.8)	7.8 (46.0)	8.2 (46.8)	7.3 (45.1)	5.7 (42.3)	2.7 (36.9)	1.5 (34.7)	4.4 (39.9)
Record low °C (°F)	−7.0 (19.4)	−11.0 (12.2)	−8.0 (17.6)	−10.0 (14.0)	−2.6 (27.3)	1.0 (33.8)	4.1 (39.4)	4.2 (39.6)	0.4 (32.7)	−5.0 (23.0)	−7.0 (19.4)	−7.0 (19.4)	−11.0 (12.2)
Average precipitation mm (inches)	77 (3.0)	56 (2.2)	88 (3.5)	53 (2.1)	31 (1.2)	49 (1.9)	47 (1.9)	61 (2.4)	96 (3.8)	95 (3.7)	80 (3.1)	90 (3.5)	823 (32.4)
Average precipitation days (≥ 1.0 mm)	17	12	18	13	9.2	12	12	11	15	18	16	19	171
Average relative humidity (%)	82	81	83	83	84	87	86	87	85	84	81	80	84
Source: Danish Meteorological Institute

While receiving more frost than most of the Faroe Islands, Mykines is more temperate in the winter than nearby Vágar. Snow is also less common despite the relatively lower winter temperatures due to the relatively low precipitation in the area. It also has a very mild tundra climate bordering on subpolar oceanic. Frost occurs on 46 days in an average year It is also likely that the lower areas of the island experience less than this, as the weather station is located at 105 meters above sea level.

Climate data for Akraberg, Suðuroy, 101 m.a.s.l.
Month	Jan	Feb	Mar	Apr	May	Jun	Jul	Aug	Sep	Oct	Nov	Dec	Year
Record high °C (°F)	9.6 (49.3)	8.8 (47.8)	9.2 (48.6)	13.0 (55.4)	15.2 (59.4)	17.2 (63.0)	17.6 (63.7)	18.4 (65.1)	17.2 (63.0)	11.8 (53.2)	10.8 (51.4)	9.8 (49.6)	18.4 (65.1)
Mean daily maximum °C (°F)	5.4 (41.7)	5.4 (41.7)	5.5 (41.9)	6.5 (43.7)	8.1 (46.6)	9.9 (49.8)	11.1 (52.0)	11.4 (52.5)	10.2 (50.4)	8.8 (47.8)	6.6 (43.9)	5.8 (42.4)	7.9 (46.2)
Daily mean °C (°F)	3.8 (38.8)	3.9 (39.0)	4.0 (39.2)	4.8 (40.6)	6.6 (43.9)	8.4 (47.1)	9.6 (49.3)	10.0 (50.0)	8.9 (48.0)	7.5 (45.5)	5.1 (41.2)	4.2 (39.6)	6.4 (43.5)
Mean daily minimum °C (°F)	1.9 (35.4)	2.0 (35.6)	2.0 (35.6)	2.9 (37.2)	5.0 (41.0)	6.9 (44.4)	8.1 (46.6)	8.5 (47.3)	7.2 (45.0)	5.8 (42.4)	3.2 (37.8)	2.2 (36.0)	4.6 (40.3)
Record low °C (°F)	−7.2 (19.0)	−10.6 (12.9)	−7.0 (19.4)	−9.3 (15.3)	−4.0 (24.8)	0.0 (32.0)	2.0 (35.6)	3.0 (37.4)	0.0 (32.0)	−2.6 (27.3)	−5.6 (21.9)	−8.4 (16.9)	−10.6 (12.9)
Average precipitation mm (inches)	90 (3.5)	60 (2.4)	77 (3.0)	48 (1.9)	43 (1.7)	51 (2.0)	65 (2.6)	65 (2.6)	94 (3.7)	108 (4.3)	90 (3.5)	95 (3.7)	884 (34.8)
Average precipitation days (≥ 1.0 mm)	18	13	17	12	10	11	12	12	16	18	17	19	173
Average relative humidity (%)	85	85	85	85	88	89	91	91	89	87	84	84	87
Source: Danish Meteorological Institute

Akraberg is milder than much of the Faroe Islands and experiences frost on 38 days in an average year, possibly less in lower areas, as the weather station is located at an elevation of 101 meters above sea level.

Climate data for Vágar Airport, Vágar, 84 m.a.s.l.
Month	Jan	Feb	Mar	Apr	May	Jun	Jul	Aug	Sep	Oct	Nov	Dec	Year
Record high °C (°F)	10.3 (50.5)	9.5 (49.1)	12.5 (54.5)	14.8 (58.6)	20.8 (69.4)	21.6 (70.9)	24.0 (75.2)	23.5 (74.3)	20.5 (68.9)	14.0 (57.2)	12.0 (53.6)	12.2 (54.0)	24.0 (75.2)
Mean daily maximum °C (°F)	4.8 (40.6)	4.8 (40.6)	5.2 (41.4)	6.4 (43.5)	8.8 (47.8)	10.8 (51.4)	12.1 (53.8)	12.3 (54.1)	10.4 (50.7)	8.6 (47.5)	6.1 (43.0)	5.3 (41.5)	8.0 (46.4)
Daily mean °C (°F)	2.7 (36.9)	2.7 (36.9)	3.1 (37.6)	4.3 (39.7)	6.6 (43.9)	8.7 (47.7)	10.2 (50.4)	10.4 (50.7)	8.6 (47.5)	6.8 (44.2)	4.2 (39.6)	3.3 (37.9)	6.0 (42.8)
Mean daily minimum °C (°F)	0.5 (32.9)	0.6 (33.1)	0.9 (33.6)	2.1 (35.8)	4.4 (39.9)	6.6 (43.9)	8.3 (46.9)	8.5 (47.3)	6.7 (44.1)	4.8 (40.6)	2.1 (35.8)	1.1 (34.0)	3.9 (39.0)
Record low °C (°F)	−10.0 (14.0)	−11.7 (10.9)	−10.6 (12.9)	−9.9 (14.2)	−5.0 (23.0)	−0.3 (31.5)	1.4 (34.5)	1.0 (33.8)	−2.5 (27.5)	−6.4 (20.5)	−10.0 (14.0)	−10.9 (12.4)	−11.7 (10.9)
Average precipitation mm (inches)	163 (6.4)	122 (4.8)	141 (5.6)	120 (4.7)	83 (3.3)	81 (3.2)	115 (4.5)	133 (5.2)	151 (5.9)	164 (6.5)	140 (5.5)	142 (5.6)	1,555 (61.2)
Average precipitation days (≥ 1.0 mm)	23	19	21	18	13	11	15	18	19	20	18	20	215
Source: Danish Meteorological Institute

Vágar has colder and snowier winters than most other places in the archipelago. Lower temperatures combined with higher precipitation are responsible for this, and measurable snow cover can be seen- a rarity in the Faroe Islands, in which snow cover (in areas which regularly experience it) is usually limited to a thin coating. The airport, at which data is recorded, is also located at a higher altitude on the island (84 meters above sea level), which might result in lower temperatures and higher precipitation than lower-lying areas on the island. Frost occurs on average on 62 days of the year, the most out of all stations included in the records of the Danish Meteorological Institute.

Climate data for Kirkja, Fugloy, 53 m.a.s.l.
Month	Jan	Feb	Mar	Apr	May	Jun	Jul	Aug	Sep	Oct	Nov	Dec	Year
Record high °C (°F)	13.4 (56.1)	12.0 (53.6)	13.0 (55.4)	14.9 (58.8)	19.8 (67.6)	20.0 (68.0)	21.3 (70.3)	20.8 (69.4)	20.6 (69.1)	18.8 (65.8)	13.0 (55.4)	14.5 (58.1)	21.3 (70.3)
Mean daily maximum °C (°F)	6.7 (44.1)	5.8 (42.4)	6.5 (43.7)	7.2 (45.0)	9.2 (48.6)	11.2 (52.2)	12.8 (55.0)	13.4 (56.1)	11.8 (53.2)	9.5 (49.1)	7.5 (45.5)	6.6 (43.9)	9.0 (48.2)
Daily mean °C (°F)	4.6 (40.3)	3.7 (38.7)	4.3 (39.7)	5.2 (41.4)	7.0 (44.6)	9.0 (48.2)	10.6 (51.1)	11.2 (52.2)	9.7 (49.5)	7.5 (45.5)	5.8 (42.4)	4.4 (39.9)	6.9 (44.4)
Mean daily minimum °C (°F)	2.4 (36.3)	1.5 (34.7)	1.8 (35.2)	2.9 (37.2)	4.9 (40.8)	7.0 (44.6)	8.8 (47.8)	9.3 (48.7)	7.7 (45.9)	5.5 (41.9)	3.8 (38.8)	2.2 (36.0)	4.8 (40.6)
Record low °C (°F)	−6.2 (20.8)	−5.5 (22.1)	−9.1 (15.6)	−4.2 (24.4)	−2.4 (27.7)	1.5 (34.7)	4.1 (39.4)	4.9 (40.8)	0.9 (33.6)	−2.0 (28.4)	−3.2 (26.2)	−6.2 (20.8)	−9.1 (15.6)
Average precipitation mm (inches)	94 (3.7)	87 (3.4)	94 (3.7)	84 (3.3)	67 (2.6)	66 (2.6)	80 (3.1)	83 (3.3)	85 (3.3)	111 (4.4)	97 (3.8)	93 (3.7)	1,040 (40.9)
Average precipitation days (≥ 1.0 mm)	18	17	18	12	13	9.8	9.7	13	15	17	18	15	175
Source: Danish Meteorological Institute

Kirkja has a very mild climate, similar to Akraberg. It has the lowest frequency of frosts out of all weather stations included in the records by the Danish Meteorological Institute, with 36 days of frost in an average year. Snowfall is uncommon, due to mild temperatures and relatively low precipitation. The weather station is somewhat high at 53 meters above sea level, which could possibly affect the data, but not as much as the previous stations.

Climate data for Nólsoy, 80 m.a.s.l.
Month	Jan	Feb	Mar	Apr	May	Jun	Jul	Aug	Sep	Oct	Nov	Dec	Year
Record high °C (°F)	12.1 (53.8)	10.6 (51.1)	10.8 (51.4)	13.3 (55.9)	18.2 (64.8)	18.6 (65.5)	18.0 (64.4)	17.8 (64.0)	17.2 (63.0)	14.0 (57.2)	12.2 (54.0)	11.5 (52.7)	18.6 (65.5)
Mean daily maximum °C (°F)	5.2 (41.4)	5.5 (41.9)	5.8 (42.4)	6.8 (44.2)	8.8 (47.8)	10.6 (51.1)	11.9 (53.4)	12.2 (54.0)	10.6 (51.1)	8.9 (48.0)	6.8 (44.2)	5.9 (42.6)	8.2 (46.8)
Daily mean °C (°F)	3.5 (38.3)	3.8 (38.8)	3.9 (39.0)	4.7 (40.5)	6.7 (44.1)	8.5 (47.3)	9.9 (49.8)	10.2 (50.4)	8.8 (47.8)	7.3 (45.1)	5.0 (41.0)	4.0 (39.2)	6.3 (43.3)
Mean daily minimum °C (°F)	1.2 (34.2)	1.6 (34.9)	1.6 (34.9)	2.5 (36.5)	4.8 (40.6)	6.6 (43.9)	8.2 (46.8)	8.4 (47.1)	6.8 (44.2)	5.2 (41.4)	2.8 (37.0)	1.6 (34.9)	4.3 (39.7)
Record low °C (°F)	−7.6 (18.3)	−6.8 (19.8)	−8.4 (16.9)	−6.6 (20.1)	−2.6 (27.3)	0.4 (32.7)	2.7 (36.9)	2.4 (36.3)	1.0 (33.8)	−4.0 (24.8)	−7.2 (19.0)	−9.2 (15.4)	−9.2 (15.4)
Average precipitation mm (inches)	99 (3.9)	72 (2.8)	92 (3.6)	59 (2.3)	56 (2.2)	54 (2.1)	60 (2.4)	66 (2.6)	107 (4.2)	126 (5.0)	107 (4.2)	109 (4.3)	1,006 (39.6)
Average precipitation days (≥ 1.0 mm)	19	15	18	13	12	11	12	13	18	20	19	20	189
Source: Danish Meteorological Institute

Nólsoy experiences a climate that is quite typical of the surrounding area and the Faroe Islands in general, and is similar to nearby Tórshavn. There are on average 44 days of frost a year. Also, as in the case of previous weather stations, the location is higher on its respective island, and the climate of the lower areas of the island differs slightly.

Climate data for Sandur, Sandoy, 5 m.a.s.l.
Month	Jan	Feb	Mar	Apr	May	Jun	Jul	Aug	Sep	Oct	Nov	Dec	Year
Record high °C (°F)	11.1 (52.0)	13.2 (55.8)	12.2 (54.0)	13.2 (55.8)	18.9 (66.0)	19.0 (66.2)	21.4 (70.5)	19.8 (67.6)	15.4 (59.7)	14.8 (58.6)	12.4 (54.3)	12.4 (54.3)	21.4 (70.5)
Mean daily maximum °C (°F)	5.7 (42.3)	5.9 (42.6)	6.3 (43.3)	7.5 (45.5)	9.8 (49.6)	11.8 (53.2)	13.0 (55.4)	13.2 (55.8)	11.3 (52.3)	9.5 (49.1)	7.1 (44.8)	6.1 (43.0)	8.9 (48.0)
Daily mean °C (°F)	3.9 (39.0)	4.1 (39.4)	4.3 (39.7)	5.5 (41.9)	7.7 (45.9)	9.6 (49.3)	11.0 (51.8)	11.2 (52.2)	9.5 (49.1)	7.8 (46.0)	5.4 (41.7)	4.2 (39.6)	7.0 (44.6)
Mean daily minimum °C (°F)	1.6 (34.9)	1.9 (35.4)	2.1 (35.8)	3.2 (37.8)	5.4 (41.7)	7.5 (45.5)	9.1 (48.4)	9.4 (48.9)	7.5 (45.5)	5.8 (42.4)	3.2 (37.8)	1.9 (35.4)	4.9 (40.8)
Record low °C (°F)	−7.8 (18.0)	−6.0 (21.2)	−7.9 (17.8)	−5.1 (22.8)	−2.4 (27.7)	0.7 (33.3)	4.4 (39.9)	3.1 (37.6)	0.8 (33.4)	−2.3 (27.9)	−6.1 (21.0)	−9.3 (15.3)	−9.3 (15.3)
Average precipitation mm (inches)	133 (5.2)	89 (3.5)	110 (4.3)	69 (2.7)	64 (2.5)	58 (2.3)	71 (2.8)	78 (3.1)	118 (4.6)	146 (5.7)	125 (4.9)	131 (5.2)	1,193 (47.0)
Average precipitation days (≥ 1.0 mm)	19	15	18	13	11	11	12	11	16	19	17	19	179
Source: Danish Meteorological Institute

The climate of Sandur is typical for a low-lying coastal location in the south of the Faroe Islands, as the weather station for Sandur is located at 5 meters above sea level. On average, Sandur experiences 41 days of frost a year.

== See also ==
- List of islands of the Faroe Islands
- List of mountains of the Faroe Islands
- Geology of the Faroe Islands
- Extreme points of the Faroe Islands
- Fjords in the Faroe Islands
- Útoyggjar
