= List of extreme points of Denmark =

This is a list of extreme points of Denmark: the points that are farther north, south, east or west than any other location.

== Latitude and longitude ==
=== Jutland Peninsula ===
This includes only land on the Jutland peninsula – land that is part of mainland Europe:

- North : Skagen, North Jutland County (57°45′9″N 10°37′1″E)
- South : Padborg, South Jutland County (54°48′N 9°21′E)
- West : Blåvandshuk, Ribe County (55°33′45″N 8°4′21″E)
- East : Grenå, Aarhus County (56°26′33″N 10°57′32″E)

Following a flood in 1825, the northernmost part of Jutland is actually an island.

=== Denmark proper ===
This includes only land in the European Union, also called Denmark proper, excluding Greenland and the Faroe Islands which are considered separate countries:

- North : Skagen, North Jutland County (57°45′9″N 10°37′1″E)
- South : Gedser, Falster (54°33′33″N 11°58′12″E)
- West : Blåvandshuk, Ribe County (55°33′45″N 8°4′21″E)
- East : Østerskær, Christiansø (55°19′06″N 15°11′50″E)

=== All territories ===
Danish territory includes the island of Kaffeklubben, the northernmost permanent piece of land on earth. There are several temporary gravel banks marginally further north, such as Oodaaq, but these are not included here.

- North : Kaffeklubben Island, Greenland (83°39′45″N 30°36′50″W)
- South : Gedser, Falster
- West : Cape Alexander, Greenland
- East : Østerskær, Christiansø (55°19′06″N 15°11′50″E)

Gedser is also the southernmost point of Scandinavia and the Nordic countries.

== Altitude ==
- Maximum :
  - Denmark proper : Møllehøj, 170.86 m (560.56 ft)
- Minimum : Lammefjord, −7 m (−23 ft)

== See also ==
- Extreme points of Europe
- Extreme points of Earth
- Geography of Denmark
- Extreme points of the Faroe Islands
- Geography of Greenland#Extreme points
