= Gedser =

- Town
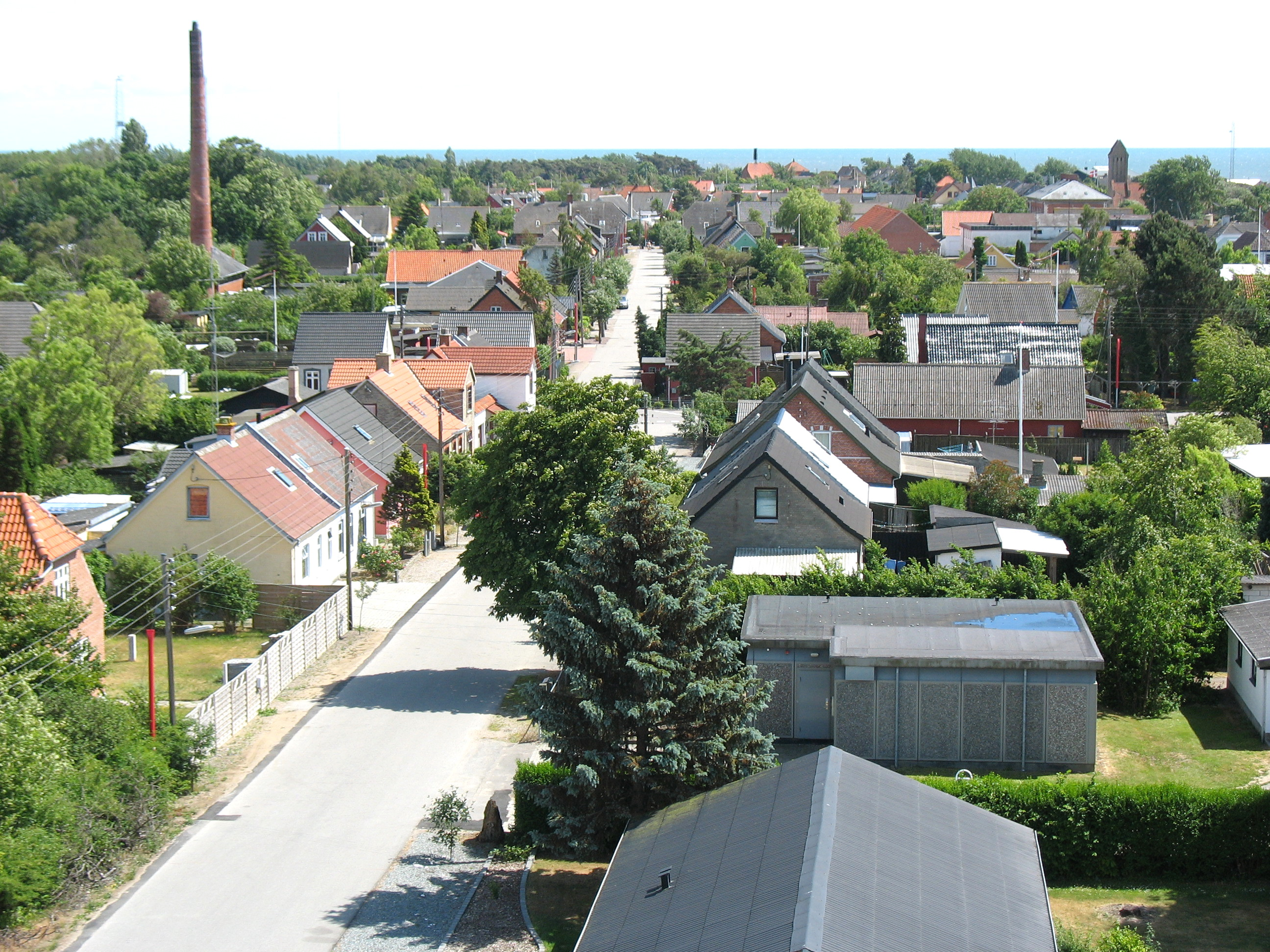
- Gedser in June 2008.

- Locator map of Gedser in Denmark
- Coordinates: 54°35′N 11°56′E
- Country: Denmark
- Region: Zealand (Sjælland)
- Former county: Storstrøm (1970–2006)
- Municipality: Guldborgsund (seat : Nykøbing Falster)
- Elevation: 5 m (16 ft)

Population (2026)
  - Total: 610
- Time zone: UTC+1 (CET)
  - Summer (DST): UTC+2 (CEST)
- Postal code: 4874
- Area code: (+45) ..

Gedser is a town at the southern tip of the Danish island of Falster in the Guldborgsund Municipality in Sjælland region. It is the southernmost town in Denmark, and also the southernmost point of Scandinavia and the Nordic countries. The town has a population of 610 (1 January 2026). It is an important port town on the Baltic Sea.

== History ==
=== Overview ===
Gedser Church was designed by Peder Vilhelm Jensen-Klint and dates from 1915.

Gedser was the first place German troops landed during the occupation of Denmark on 9 April 1940, at 3:55 in the morning. A number of armored cars and infantry troops hid in the ferry from Warnemünde, Rostock and advanced into the harbor as soon as the ship docked, soon after followed by another ferry.

=== Government ===
Until 1 January 2007, Gedser was a parish of the former municipality of Sydfalster (seat : Væggerløse) in Storstrøm County. In the Kommunalreformen ("The Municipality Reform" of 2007) that municipality merged with Nykøbing Falster, Nysted, Nørre Alslev, Sakskøbing and Stubbekøbing to form Guldborgsund Municipality.

=== Museum ===
The local museum is Det Sorte Museum [The Black Museum], with elements of local geology, including Baltic amber, and occasional temporary exhibitions, such as dinosaurs.

== Geography ==
Situated in the southernmost part of Denmark on the island of Falster, Gedser is a port town on the Baltic Sea. European route E55 (Helsingborg-Kalamata) passes through the town.

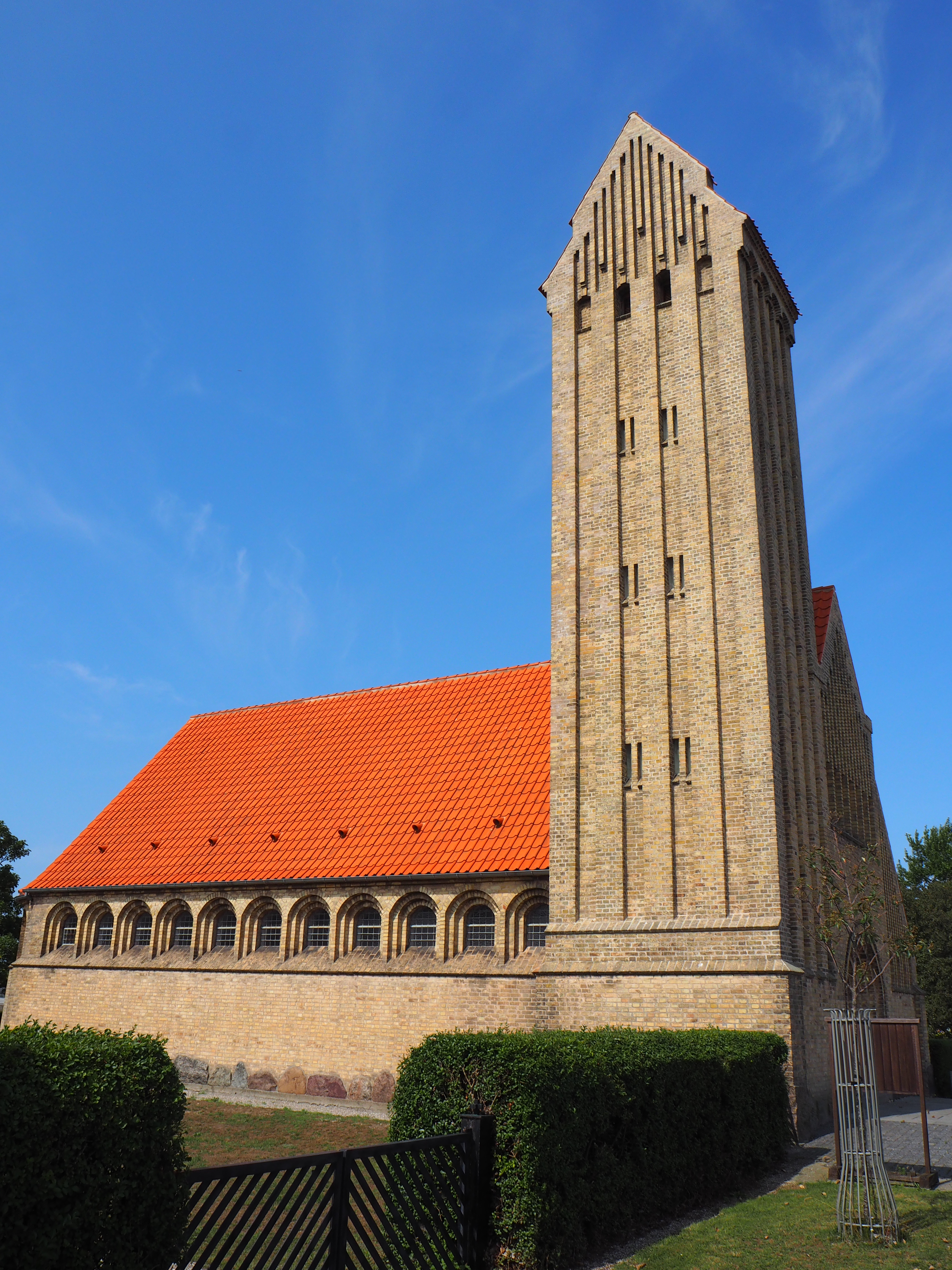
Gedser Church

Gedser Odde is the southernmost point in Denmark.

== Transportation ==
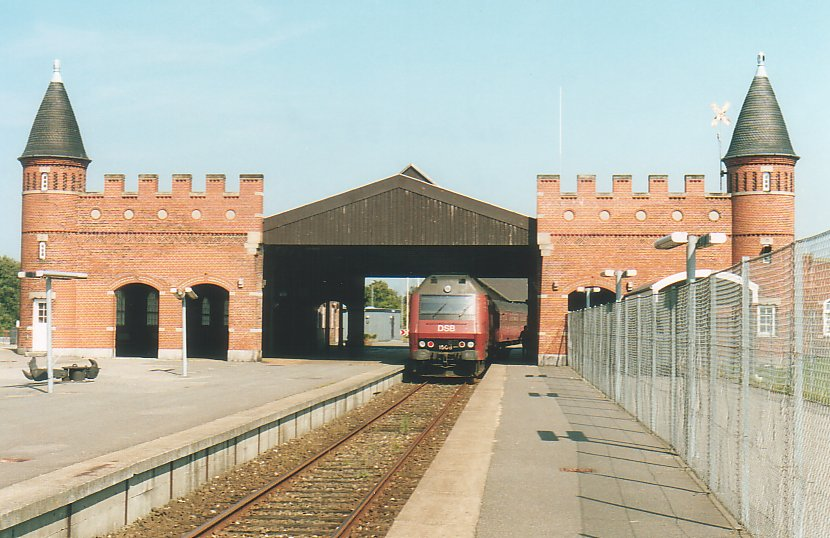
Gedser railway station

A car ferry route has operated from Gedser to Rostock in Germany since 1995, served by Scandlines. Formerly, there were also train and car ferry routes to Großenbrode (1951–1963) and Warnemünde (1903–1995) and a car ferry route to Travemünde (1963–1990), all in Germany. A bridge linking Gedser to Rostock was proposed, although a decision was made in 2007 to support a planned fixed link across the Fehmarn Belt to the west of Gedser instead.

Gedser railway station that was served by DSB services closed in December 2009.

== Photogallery ==
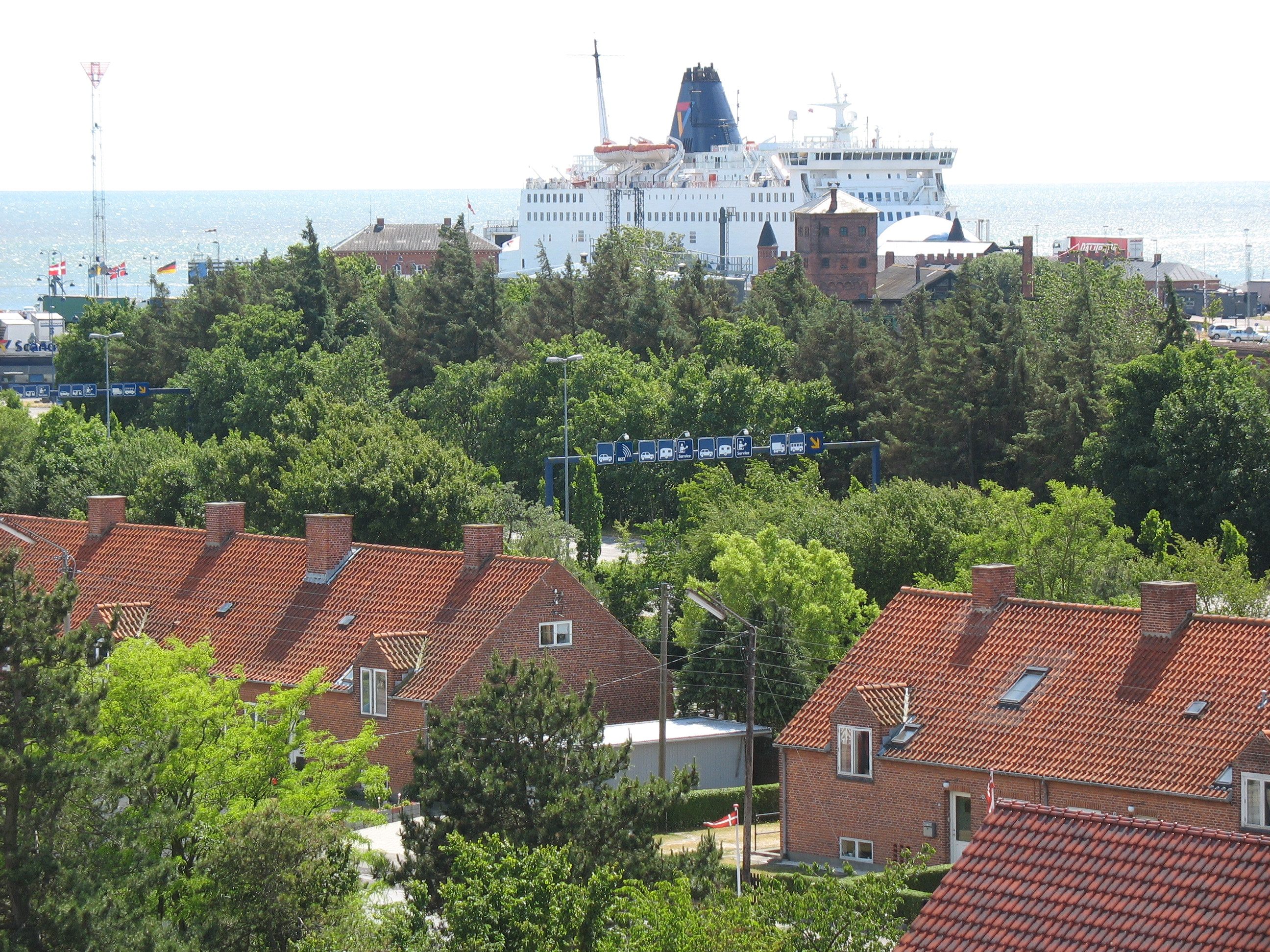
Panorama

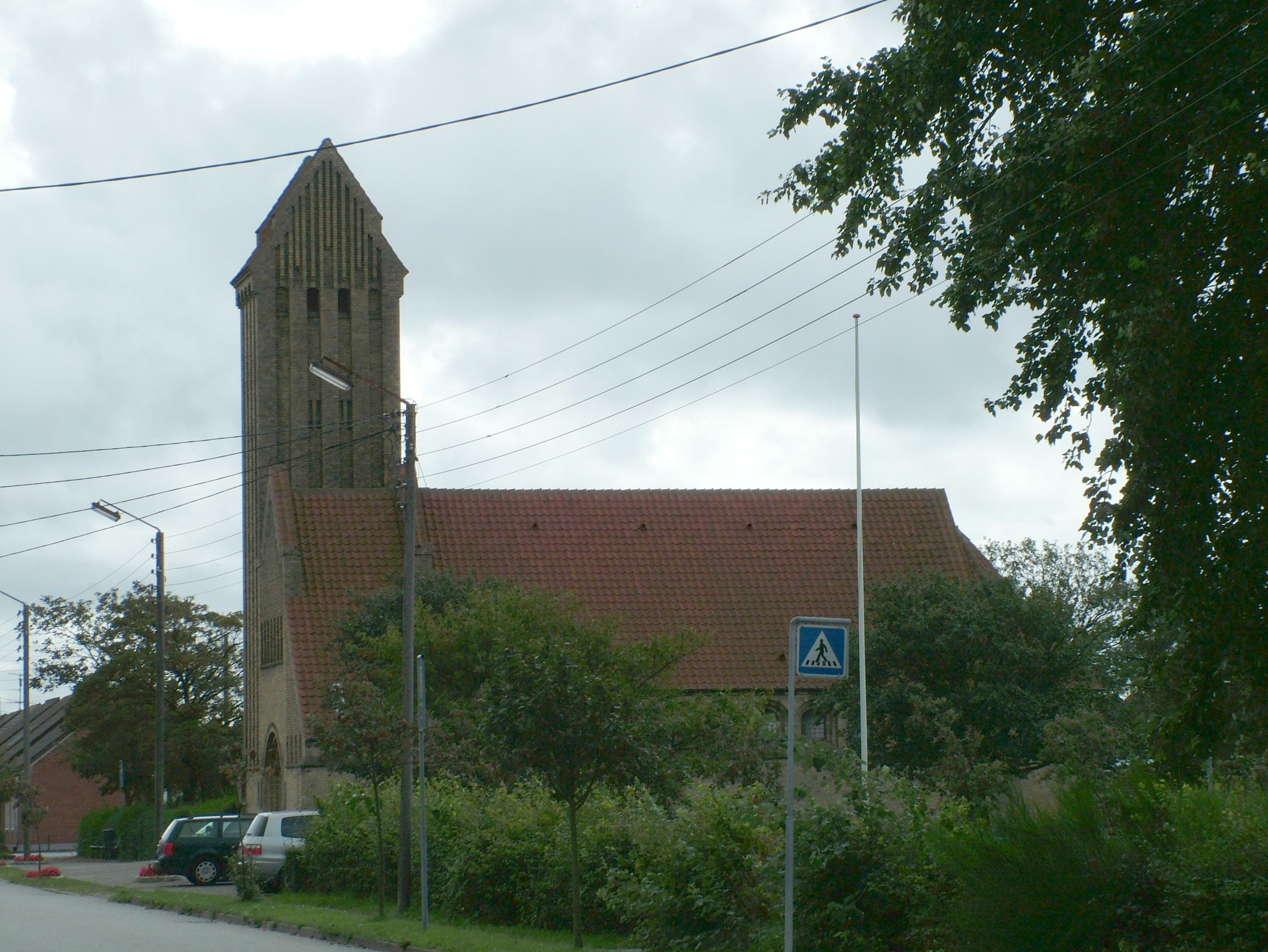
The church

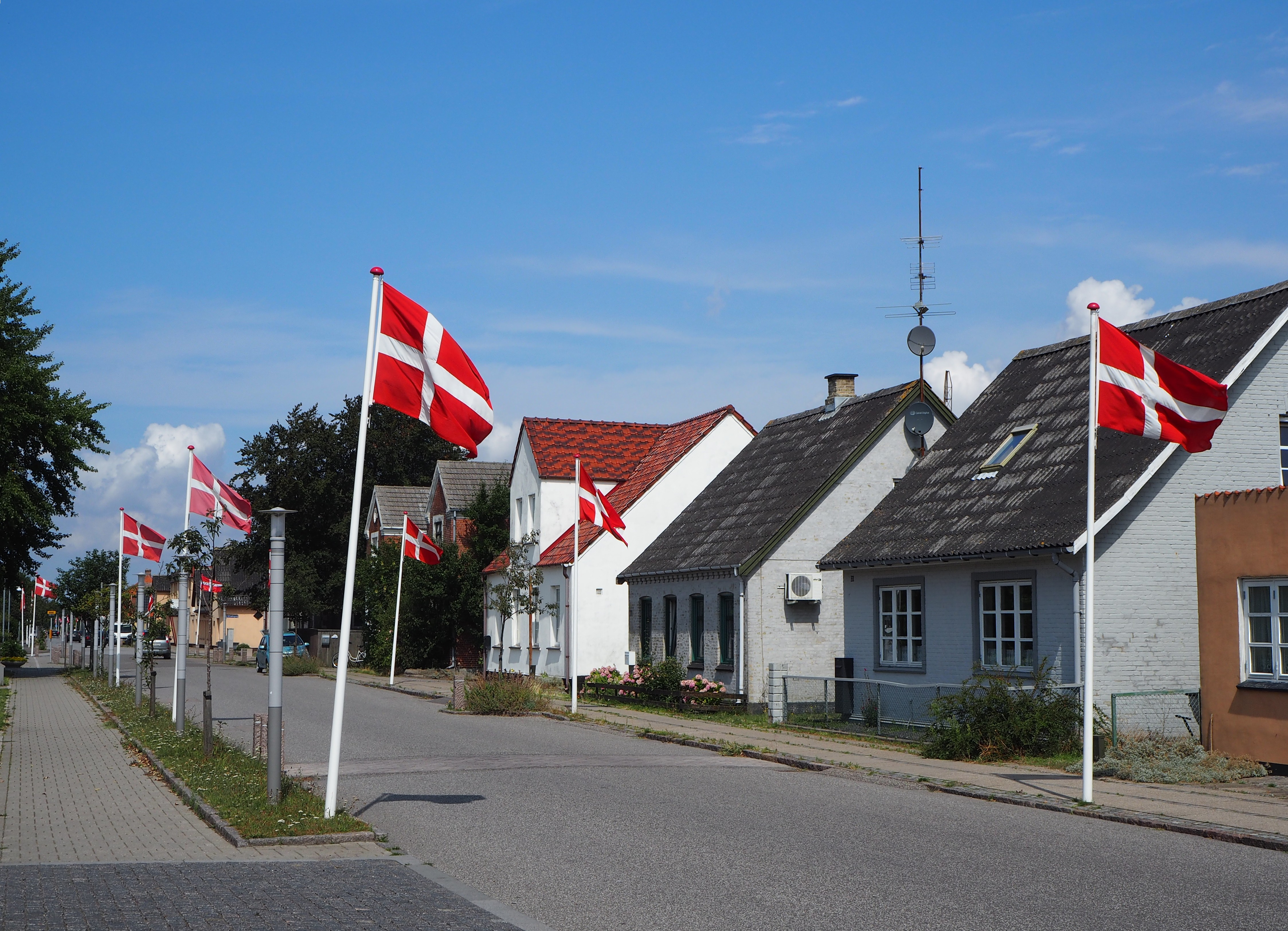
Main street
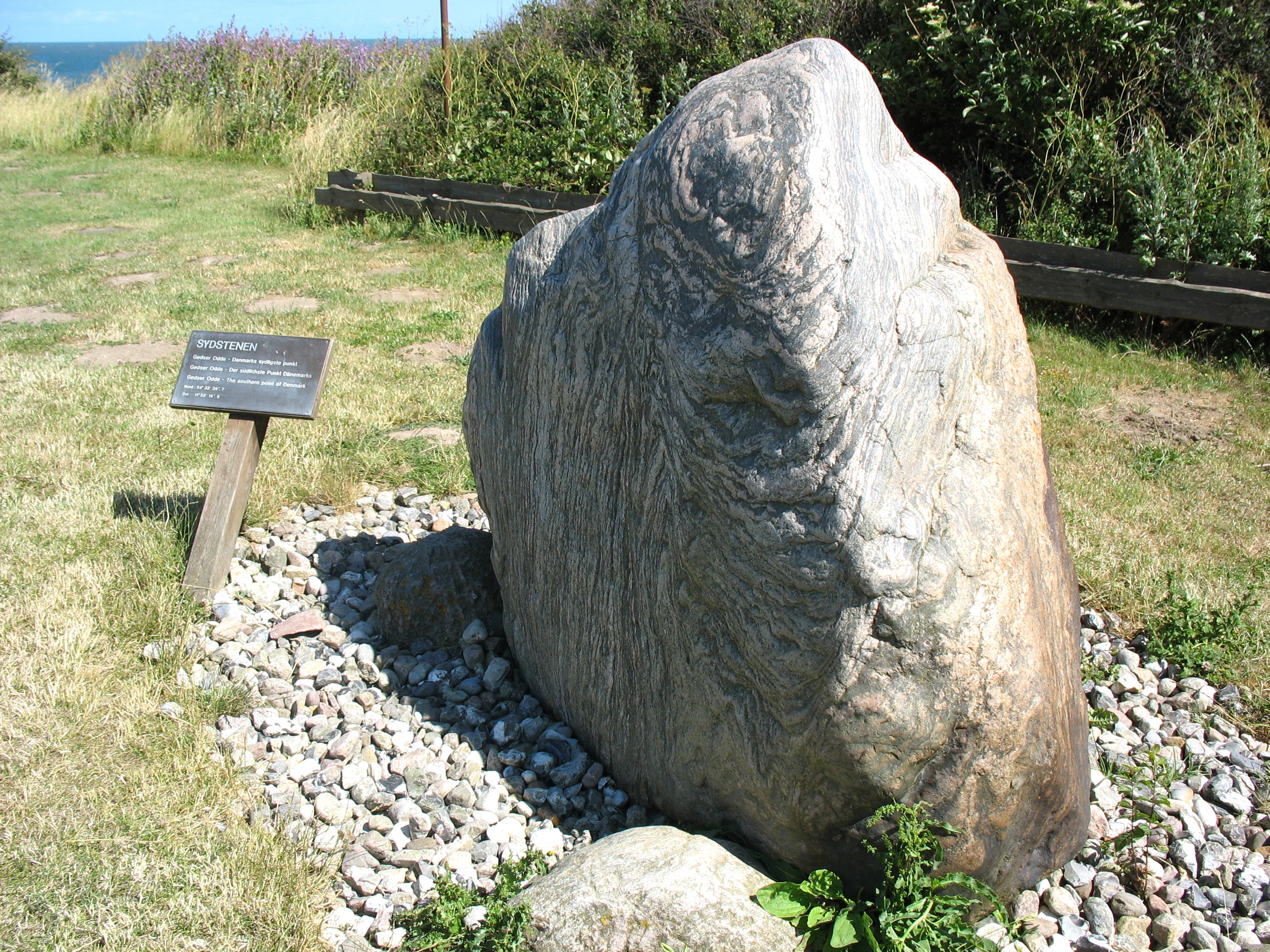
Gedser Odde, southernmost point of Denmark

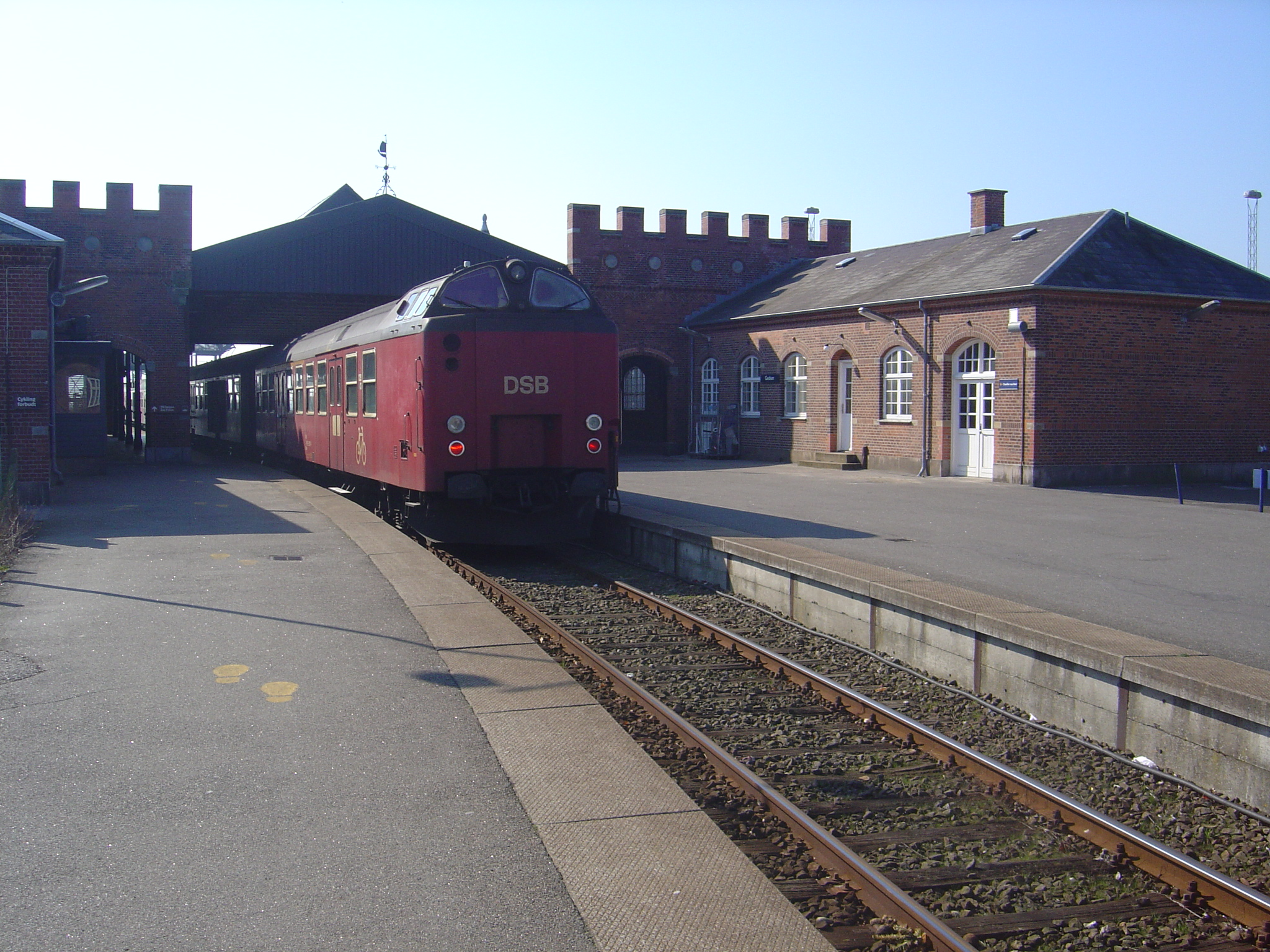
Railway station

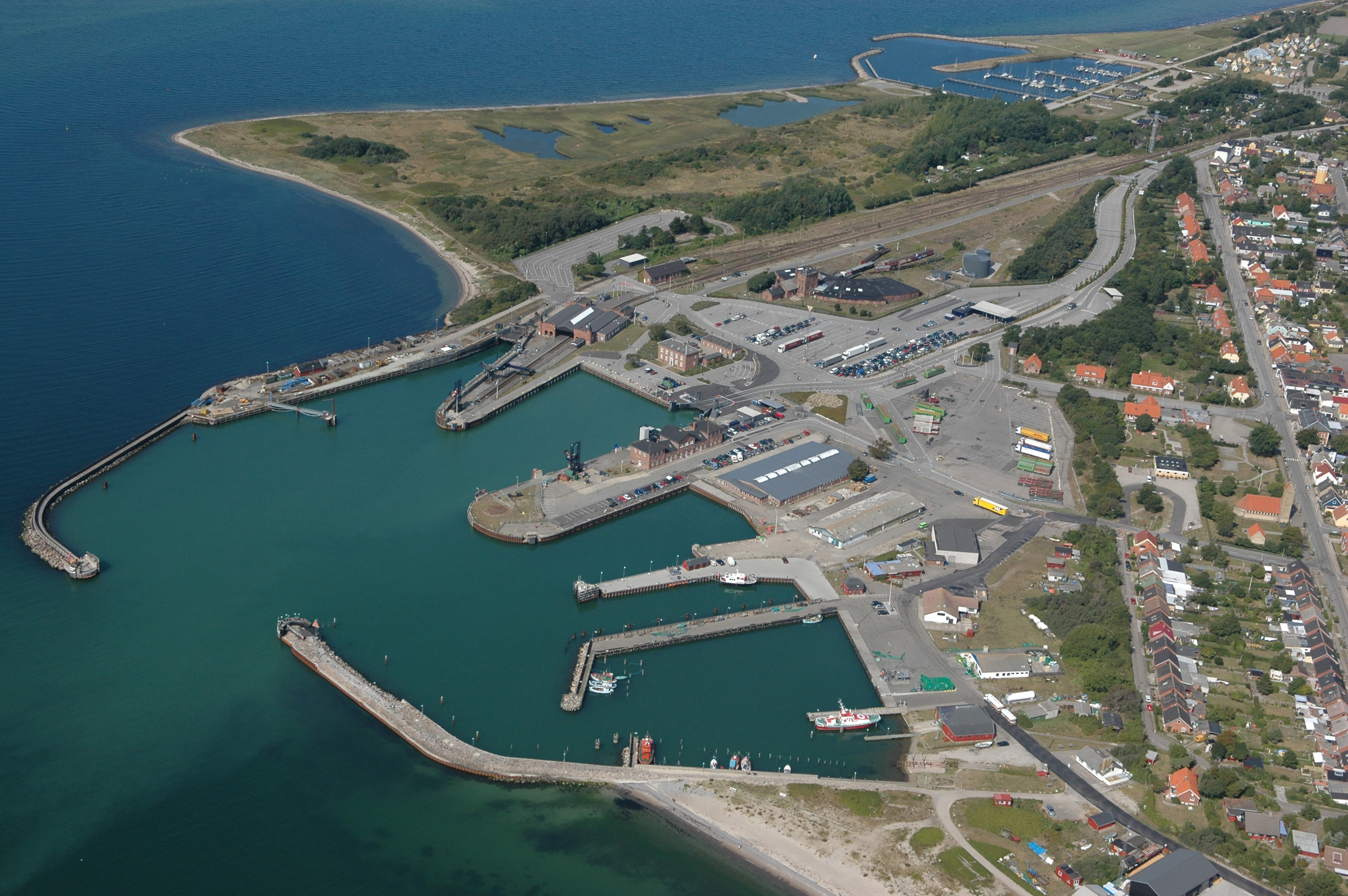
Ferry terminal
