= List of lighthouses in the Faroe Islands =

This is a list of lighthouses in Faroe Islands.

== Lighthouses ==
Name	Image	Island	Location	Year built	Notes
Akraberg Lighthouse		Suðuroy	Akraberg 61.394428°N 6.679112°W	1909	Because of the constant winds in the area the structure is supported by guy-wires.
Borðan Lighthouse		Nólsoy	C. 800 metres (870 yd) west of Nólsoy lighthouse	1900	
Kallur Lighthouse		Kalsoy	On a promontory at the northwestern edge of Kalsoy island	1927	
Kalsoy Lighthouse		Kalsoy	At the southern end of Kalsoy island	1893	
Nólsoy Lighthouse		Nólsoy	7 kilometres (4.3 miles) southeast of Tórshavn	1893	This lighthouse serves as a landfall light for Tórshavn which is the capital of the Faroes. Not to be confused with the nearby Borðan Lighthouse.
Mykineshólmur Lighthouse		Mykineshólmur west off Mykines island		1909	The westernmost lighthouse in the Faroes
Skansin Fort Lighthouse		Streymoy	Tórshavn	1888	

== See also ==
- Lists of lighthouses and lightvessels
