= Extreme points of the Faroe Islands =

List of geographic points

Extreme points of Faroe Islands

The extreme points of the Faroe Islands include the coordinates that are further north, south, east or west than any other location in the Faroe Islands; and the highest and the lowest elevations in the territory.

The latitude and longitude are expressed in decimal degree notation, in which a positive latitude value refers to the northern hemisphere, and a negative value refers to the southern hemisphere. Similarly, a positive longitude value refers to the eastern hemisphere, and a negative value refers to the western hemisphere. The coordinates used in this article are sourced from Google Earth, which makes use of the World Geodetic System (WGS) 84, a geodetic reference system.

== Latitude and longitude ==
| Heading | Location | Coordinates (Note: Coordinates obtained from Google Earth. Google Earth makes use of the WGS84 geodetic reference system.) | Ref |
|---|---|---|---|
| North | Enniberg, Viðoy | 62.400000°N 6.566667°W | |
| South | Munkurin, south of Suðuroy | 61.350000°N 6.666667°W | |
| West | Gáadrangur, a rock to the west of Mykines | 62.100000°N 7.783333°W | |
| East | Stapin, a sea stack east of Fugloy | 62.333333°N 6.266667°W | |

== Altitude ==
| Extremity | Name | Elevation | Location | Coordinates | Ref |
|---|---|---|---|---|---|
| Highest | Slættaratindur | 880 m (2,887 ft) | Eysturoy | 62.1800°N 7.0000°W | |
| Lowest | Atlantic Ocean and Norwegian Sea | 0 m (0.0 ft) | Sea Coast | | |

== See also ==
- Extreme points of Earth
- Extreme points of Europe
- Extreme points of Denmark
- Geography of the Faroe Islands
