= Akraberg =

Southern tip of Suðuroy, in the Faroe Islands

Akraberg Lighthouse
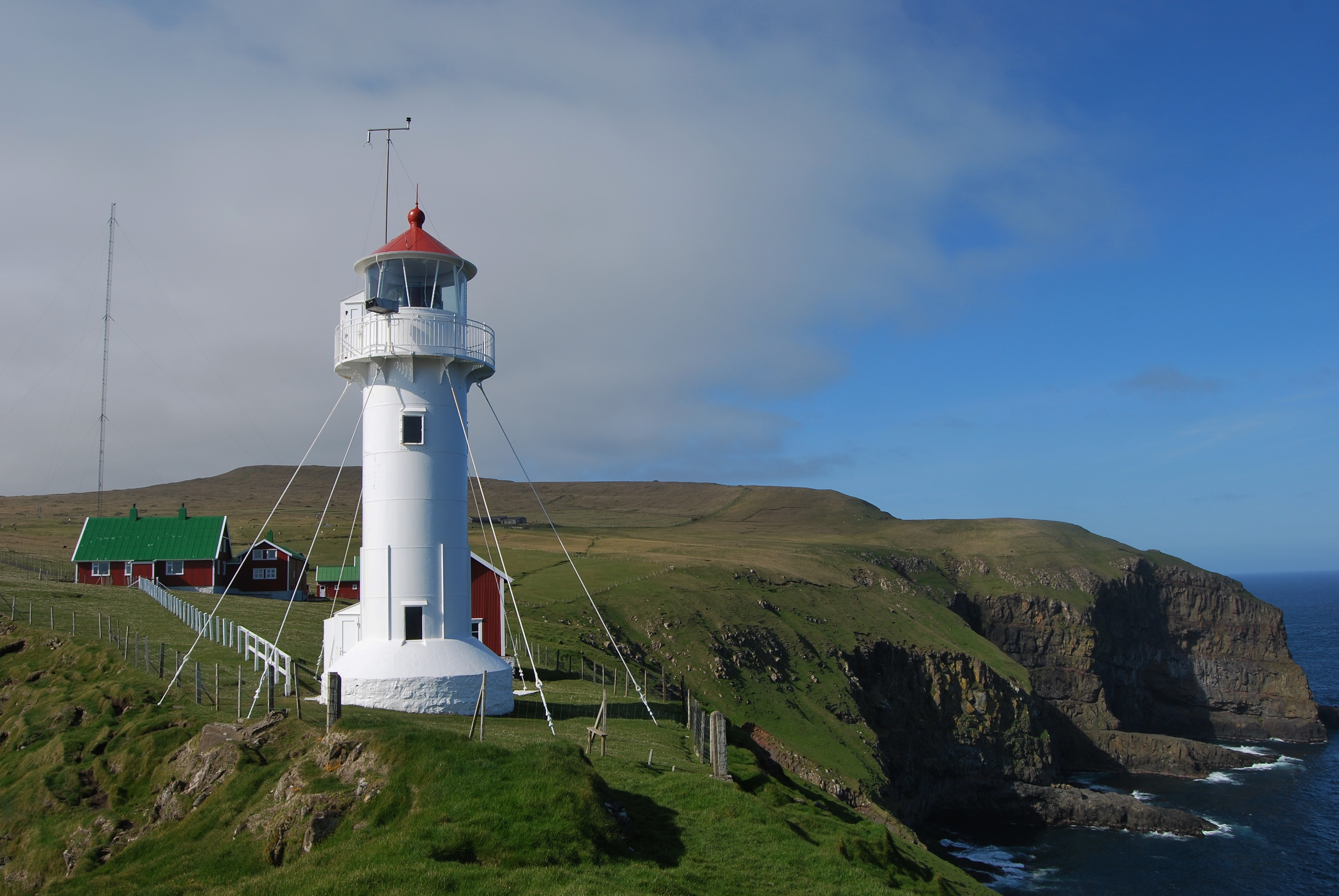
- Akraberg Lighthouse
- Location: Suðuroy, Faroe Islands; Denmark
- Coordinates: 61.394428°N 6.679112°W

Tower
- Constructed: 1909
- Foundation: concrete base
- Construction: cast iron
- Height: 14 metres (46 ft)
- Shape: cylindrical tower with balcony and lantern
- Markings: white tower and lantern, red lantern roof
- Fog signal: one blast every 60s.

Light
- Focal height: 94 metres (308 ft)
- Range: 20 nmi (37 km; 23 mi) (white), 14 nmi (26 km; 16 mi) (red, green)
- Characteristic: two long (2 s) flashes every 20 s, white, red or green depending on direction
- Denmark no.: DFL-6500

Akraberg is the southern tip of Suðuroy, 5 km (3.1 mi) south from the village of Sumba, in the Faroe Islands. The name Akraberg derives from akur (cereal field). Five kilometres (3.1 miles) south of Akraberg is the southernmost point of The Faroe Islands, a rock called the Munkurin (The Monk), also called Sumbiarsteinur, which is one of a group of six rocks. This group of rocks are called Flesjarnar. The sound between Suðuroy and Munkurin is notorious for its strong current, it is called Røstin; the poet Poul F. Joensen (born 1898, died 1970) mentioned it in one of his poems "...Røstin rísin rann...".

The waters south of Sumba are notorious for their unpredictability. Here lies a series of rocky skerries below and above sea level, and the meeting of currents, together with wind and weather, create dangerous conditions for boats and ships. The situation became more hazardous in 1884 when much of the high rock Munkurin on the southernmost rock, Sumbiarsteinur, crashed into the sea, and the seafarers lost the best fixed landmark of the rocks.

== The lighthouse ==
In 1909, a lighthouse and some family houses were built in Akraberg. The lighthouse itself is 14 metres (46 ft) tall, it consists of a white cylindrical tower with red lantern roof. It was fitted with guy wires to withstand the wind drag on this southern headland. The focal plane is located at 94 metres (308 ft) above sea level, a flash signal is given every 20 seconds with red, green and white sectors. If needed, a fog horn may be sounded every 60 seconds. Today, there are only two houses and a lighthouse, but there are no inhabitants. The last family who lived there was the lighthouse keeper Hans Petur Kjærbo and his family. They lived there during a terrible hurricane in December 1988, which was later called the Christmas Hurricane. Luckily the house was very strongly built and didn't get blasted away by the strong wind. But much damage had been done to their car, the soil and parts of the house; a window was blown out. Much damage happened in the Faroe Islands that night, many houses were blasted away by the hurricane. After that the lighthouse keeper and his family moved away from Akraberg, and nobody has lived there since then, except for tourists who rent one of the two houses there. The lighthouse is now automatic, but it needs attention regularly. Hans Petur Kjærbo is still a lighthouse keeper, but now he works not only in Akraberg but also attends most of the other lighthouses in the Faroe Islands.

== Medium wave station ==
Near Akraberg stands the medium wave station of Kringvarp Føroya, the Faroese broadcasting network. This transmits on 531 kHz. The antenna consists of a 141 metres (463 ft) tall guyed mast and can be received also in parts of Northern and Western Europe.

== A peatland landscape ==
The peatland landscape above the headland of Akraberg at the southern tip of Suðuroy features relict peat cuttings of various age – from the 1950s and perhaps centuries before – as well as mounds of peat. The removal of dried peat from the torvløð and the continued use of the platforms led to a gradual increase in torvlað height. General comparisons are made with peat mounds from the British Isles. These features are of unknown antiquity, but they have been associated with the possible pre-Viking presence of Irish monks or priests (papar).

== Blæing ==
The Blæing area north of Akraberg has big and small rocks and stones, which have come down into the valley during the Ice Age. One characteristic of the stones is the colour. You go down in Blæingsskarð, which is a passage down from the ridge. There is a story about two brothers, Kaspar and Sjúrður, who hid here in the stony landscape. They had leased land from the priest in Vágur, but because the price was high, they would often starve and had to steal sheep to survive. In the old days, stealing sheep was a very serious crime in the Faroe Islands. The brothers fled from the authorities and hid in a cave in Blæing, which is called Cave Kaspar today. Among other things, there is a long stone wall, called Eiriksgarður, and a sheep fold, which is probably built centuries ago. No one knows exactly when or who built them.

== History ==
=== The Frisian people ===
According to Faroese legends and folk songs a Frisian colony was in Akraberg from the year 1040 until The Black Death killed most of them around 1350. A few of them, a man called Bóndin í Akrabergi (The Farmer of Akraberg) was said to have survived the Black Death and after that he and his household moved to Sumba. The Frisians remained heathen a long time after the rest of the Faroe Islands were Christianized. It is said that they partly lived by piracy and they are mentioned in several Faeroese legends.

=== World War II in Akraberg ===
During World War II, Akraberg lighthouse and radio were serviced by technical Royal Air Force soldiers, working on one of the first radar stations, which scanned the water and air south of the Faroe Islands. There are still some buildings in Akraberg from the World War II period, which were built by the British soldiers using reinforced concrete.

== Climate ==
Akraberg has a very mild winter version of a tundra climate which borders very closely on a subpolar oceanic climate.

Climate data for Akraberg, Suðuroy, 101 m.a.s.l.
Month	Jan	Feb	Mar	Apr	May	Jun	Jul	Aug	Sep	Oct	Nov	Dec	Year
Record high °C (°F)	9.6 (49.3)	8.8 (47.8)	9.2 (48.6)	13.0 (55.4)	15.2 (59.4)	17.2 (63.0)	17.6 (63.7)	18.4 (65.1)	17.2 (63.0)	11.8 (53.2)	10.8 (51.4)	9.8 (49.6)	18.4 (65.1)
Mean daily maximum °C (°F)	5.4 (41.7)	5.4 (41.7)	5.5 (41.9)	6.5 (43.7)	8.1 (46.6)	9.9 (49.8)	11.1 (52.0)	11.4 (52.5)	10.2 (50.4)	8.8 (47.8)	6.6 (43.9)	5.8 (42.4)	7.9 (46.2)
Daily mean °C (°F)	3.8 (38.8)	3.9 (39.0)	4.0 (39.2)	4.8 (40.6)	6.6 (43.9)	8.4 (47.1)	9.6 (49.3)	10.0 (50.0)	8.9 (48.0)	7.5 (45.5)	5.1 (41.2)	4.2 (39.6)	6.4 (43.5)
Mean daily minimum °C (°F)	1.9 (35.4)	2.0 (35.6)	2.0 (35.6)	2.9 (37.2)	5.0 (41.0)	6.9 (44.4)	8.1 (46.6)	8.5 (47.3)	7.2 (45.0)	5.8 (42.4)	3.2 (37.8)	2.2 (36.0)	4.6 (40.3)
Record low °C (°F)	−7.2 (19.0)	−10.6 (12.9)	−7.0 (19.4)	−9.3 (15.3)	−4.0 (24.8)	0.0 (32.0)	2.0 (35.6)	3.0 (37.4)	0.0 (32.0)	−2.6 (27.3)	−5.6 (21.9)	−8.4 (16.9)	−10.6 (12.9)
Average precipitation mm (inches)	90 (3.5)	60 (2.4)	77 (3.0)	48 (1.9)	43 (1.7)	51 (2.0)	65 (2.6)	65 (2.6)	94 (3.7)	108 (4.3)	90 (3.5)	95 (3.7)	884 (34.8)
Average precipitation days (≥ 1.0 mm)	18	13	17	12	10	11	12	12	16	18	17	19	173
Average relative humidity (%)	85	85	85	85	88	89	91	91	89	87	84	84	87
Source: Danish Meteorological Institute

== See also ==
- List of lighthouses in the Faroe Islands

== Gallery ==
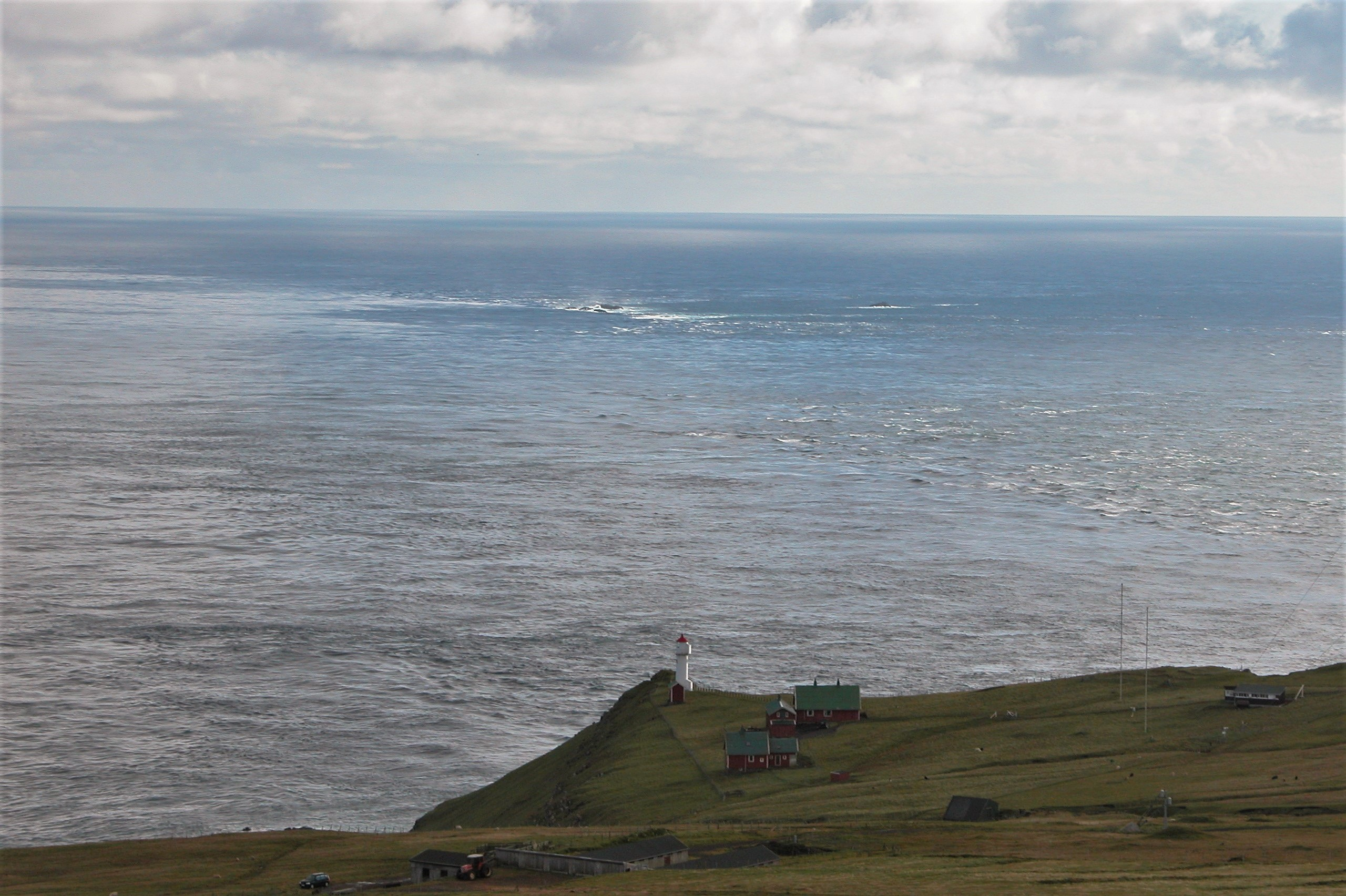
Akraberg and Sumbiarsteinur

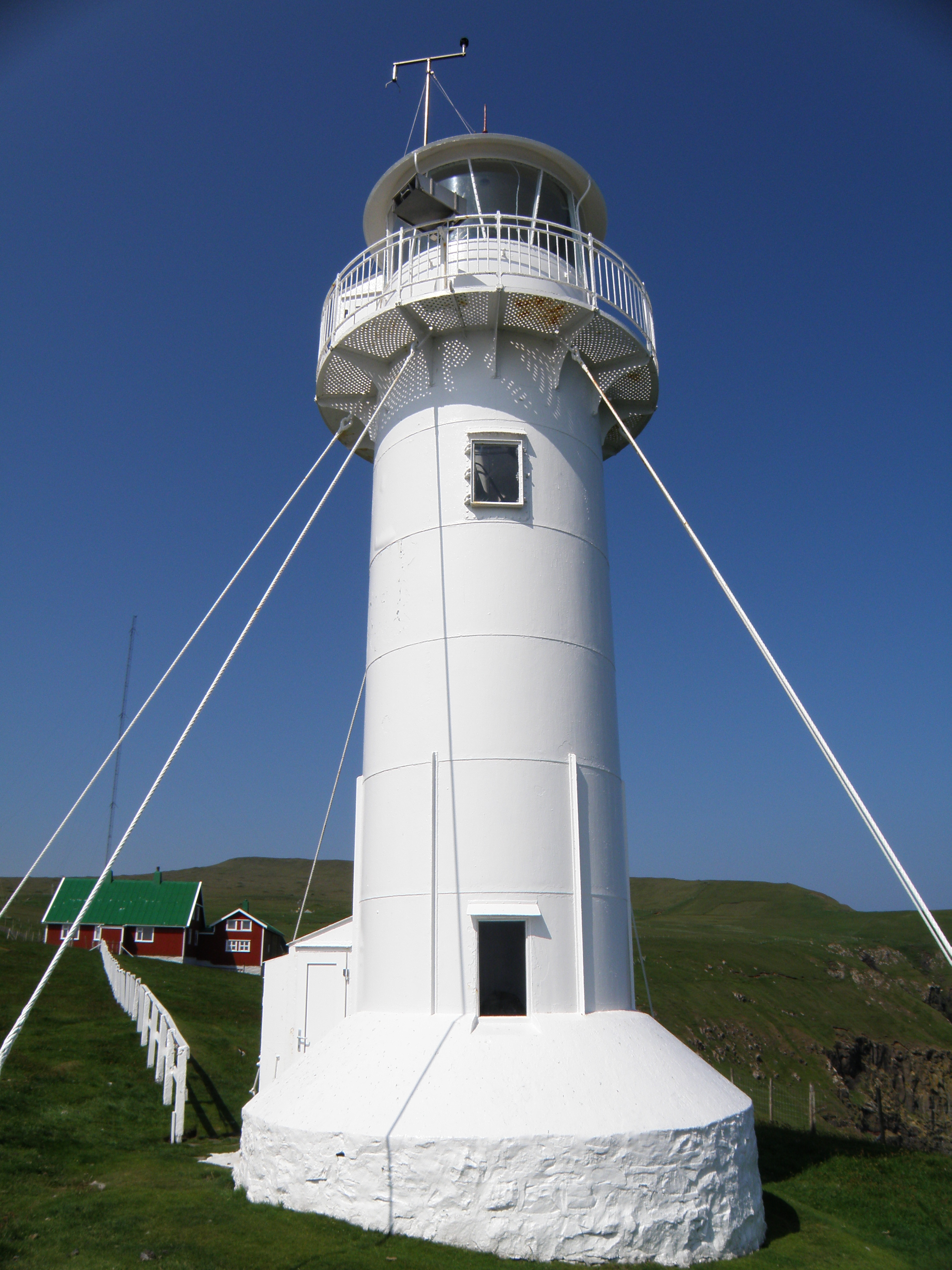
The Lighthouse in Akraberg.

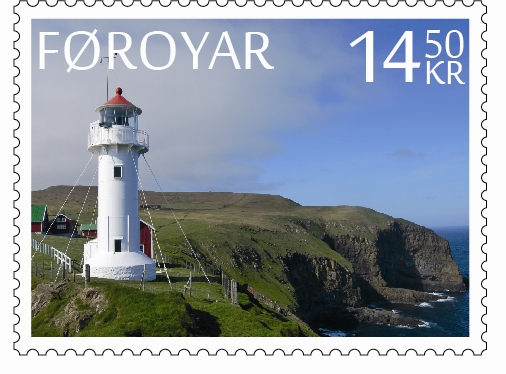
Faroese stamp, 2013, with Erik Christensens photo

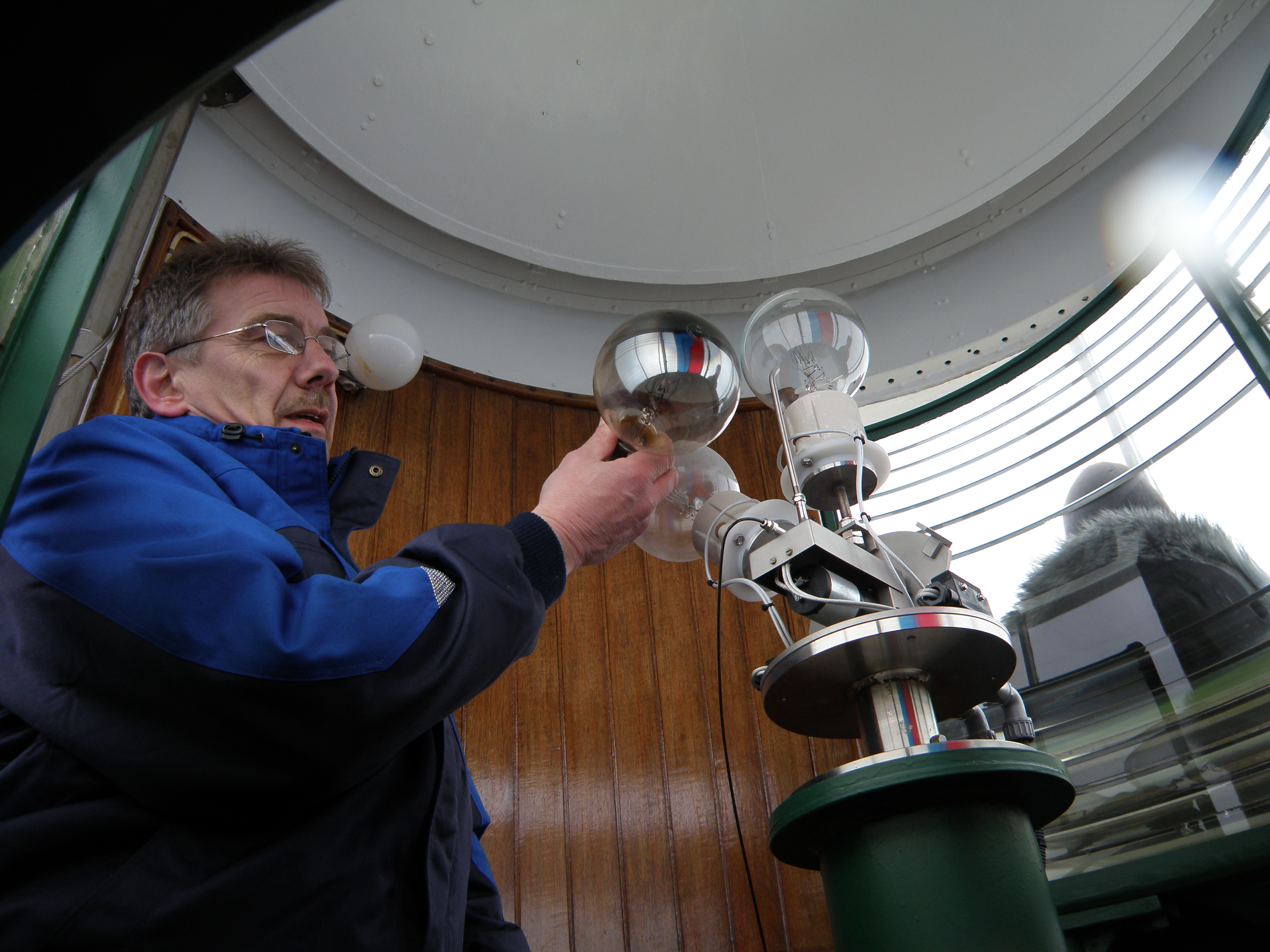
Hans Petur Kjærbo, the lighthouse keeper, is changing the bulbs in the lighthouse in Akraberg.

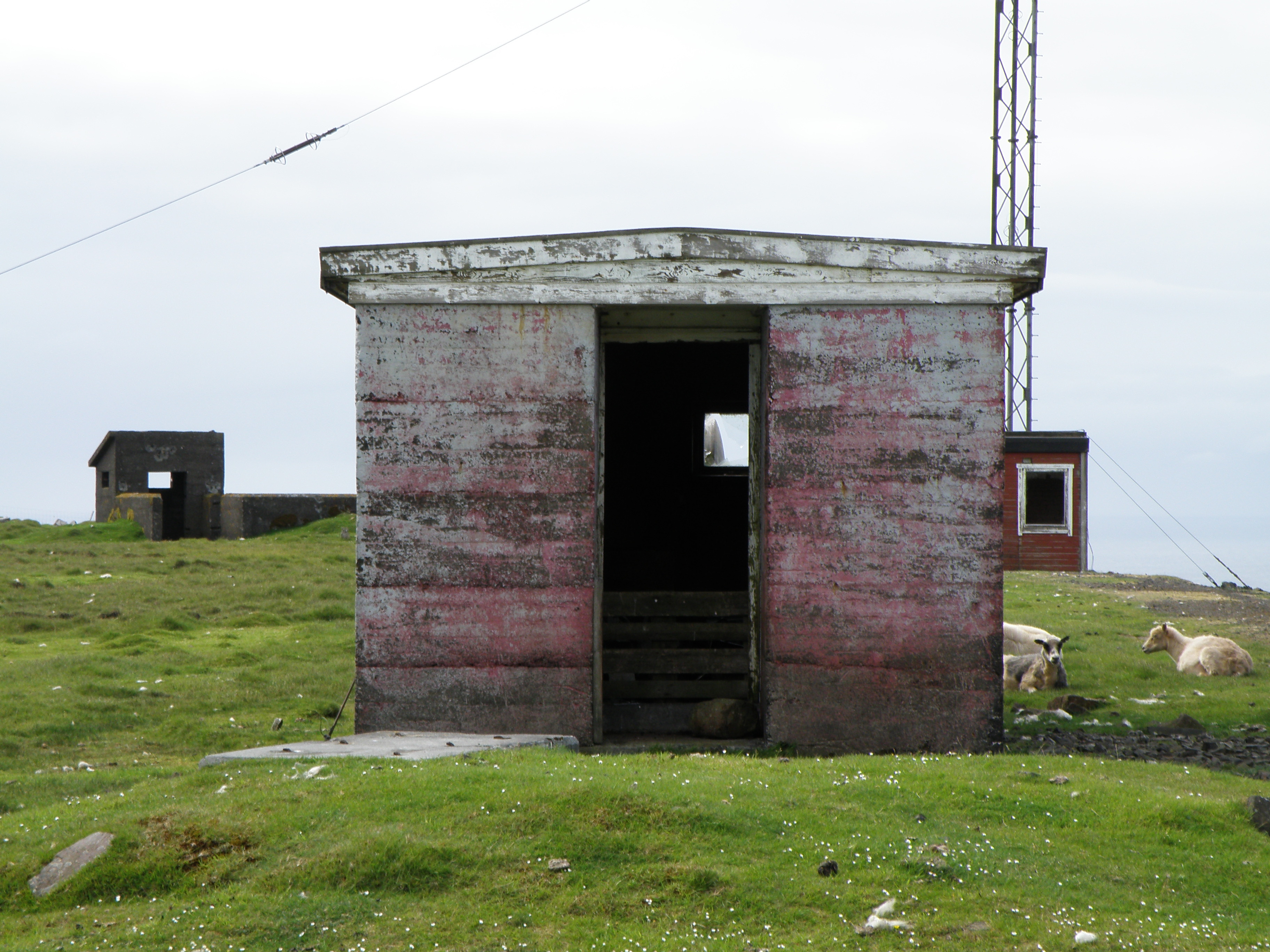
British pillboxes from World War II

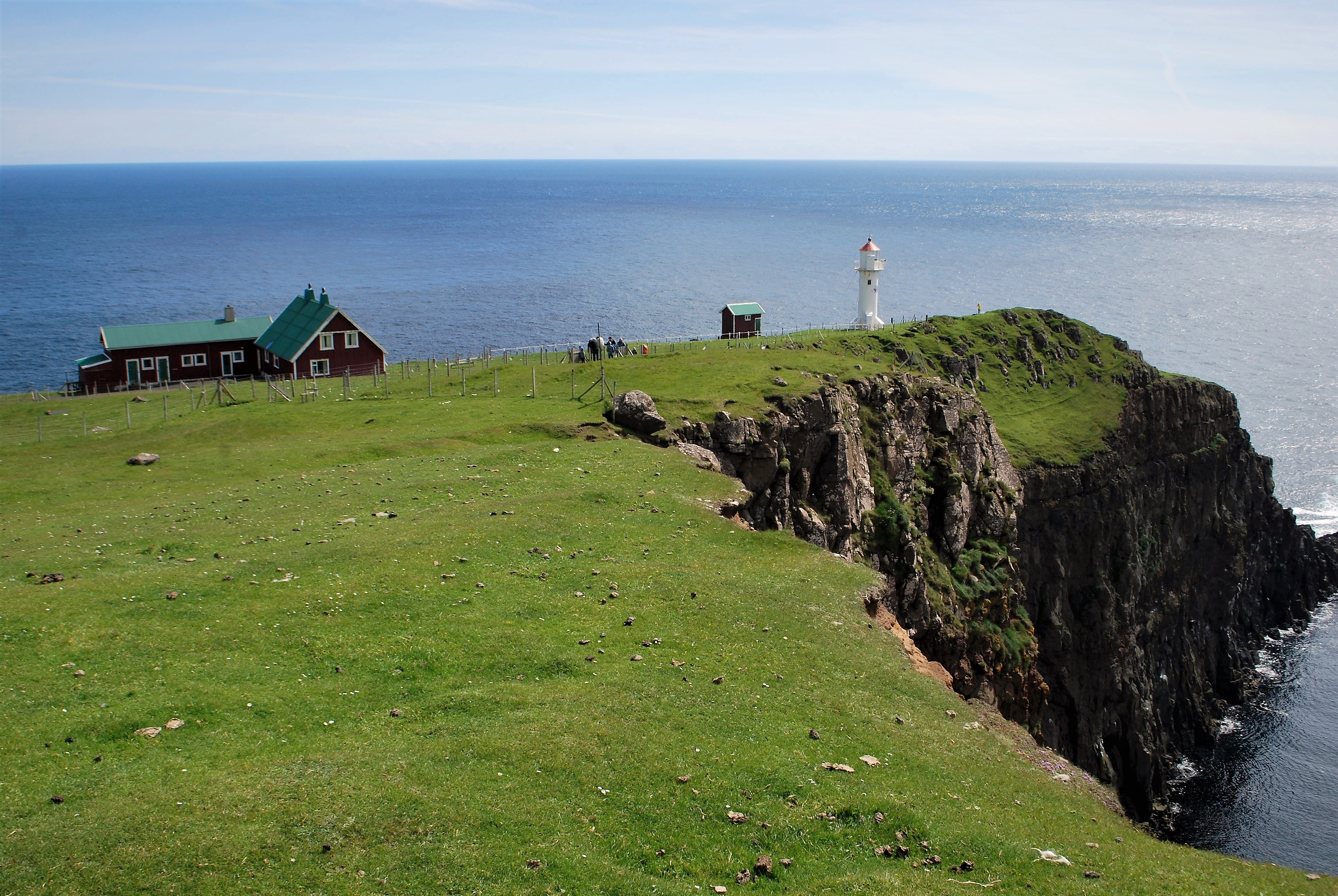
Akraberg

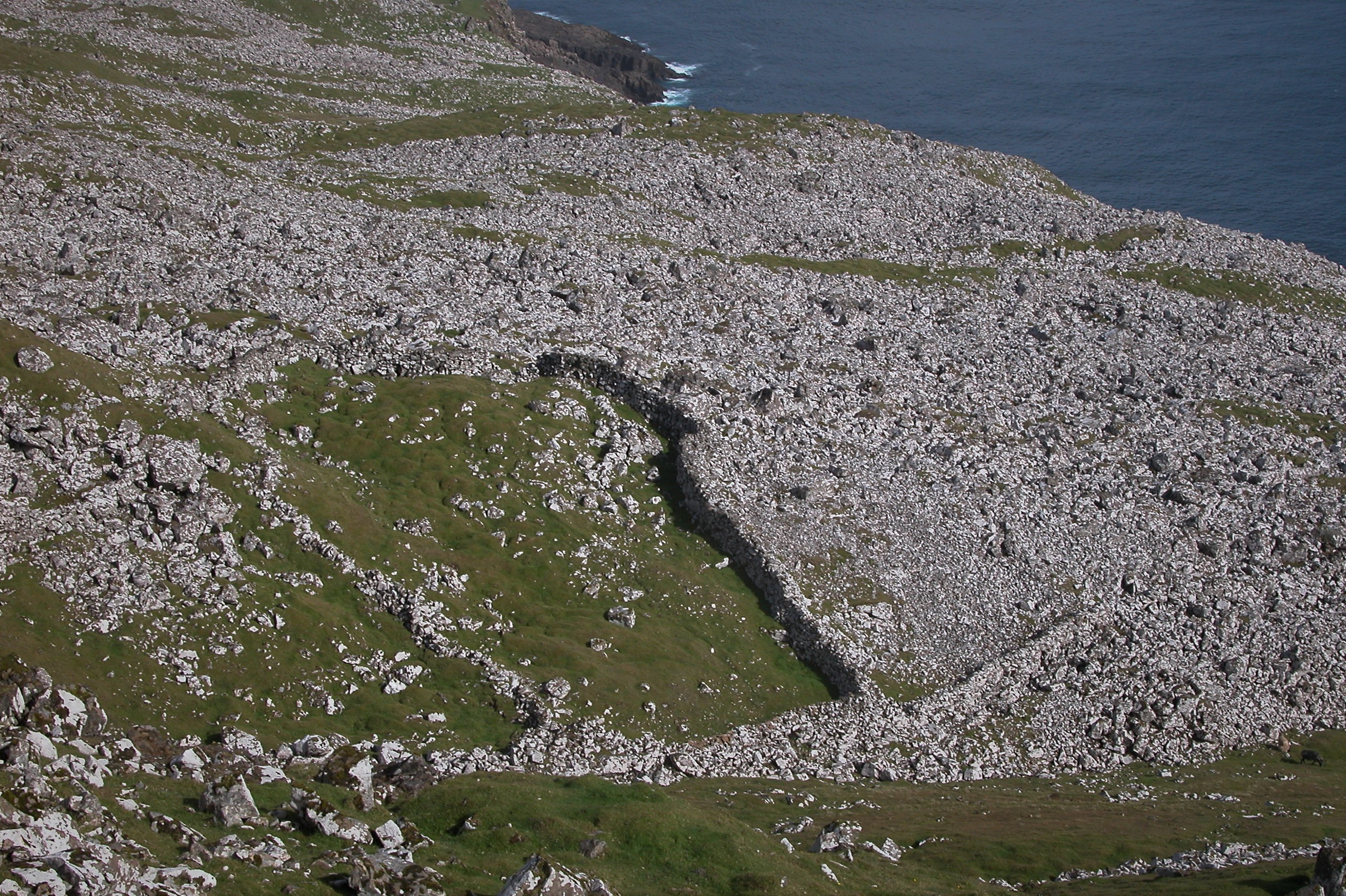
Blæing north of Akraberg
