= Munkurin =

Southernmost point of the Faroe Islands

Coordinates: 61°20′N 6°40′W

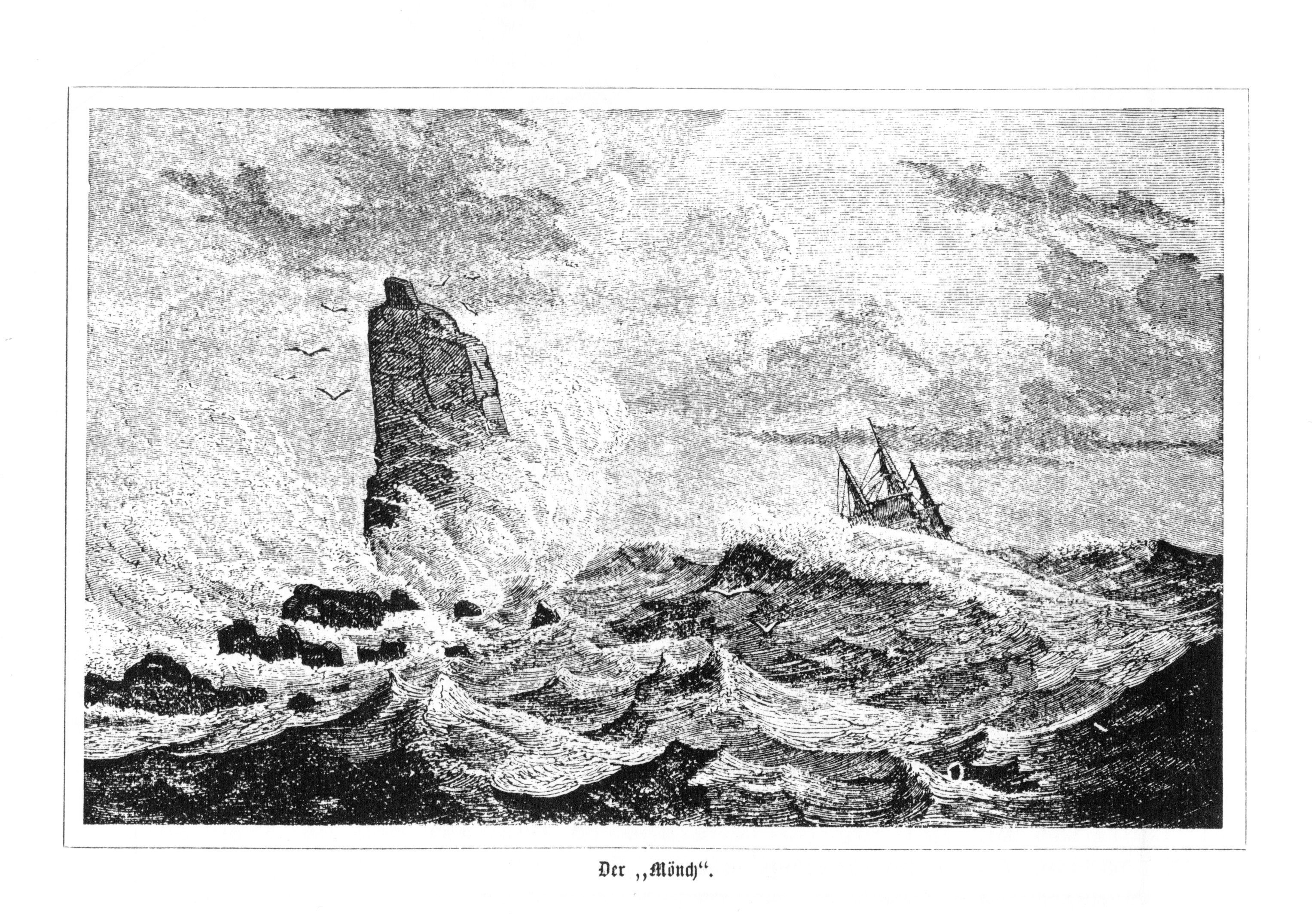
The sea stack Munkurin as a motif on a Faroese stamp, drawn before it collapsed.

Munkurin is the southernmost point of the Faroe Islands. Munkurin is an 11-metre-high rock, also known as Sumbiarsteinur. Munkur means "monk". The rock is one of a group of skerries called Flesjarnar, 5 km south of the island of Suðuroy in the Faroe Islands. The sound between Flesjarnar and Suðuroy is notorious for its strong current.

== Flesjarnar ==
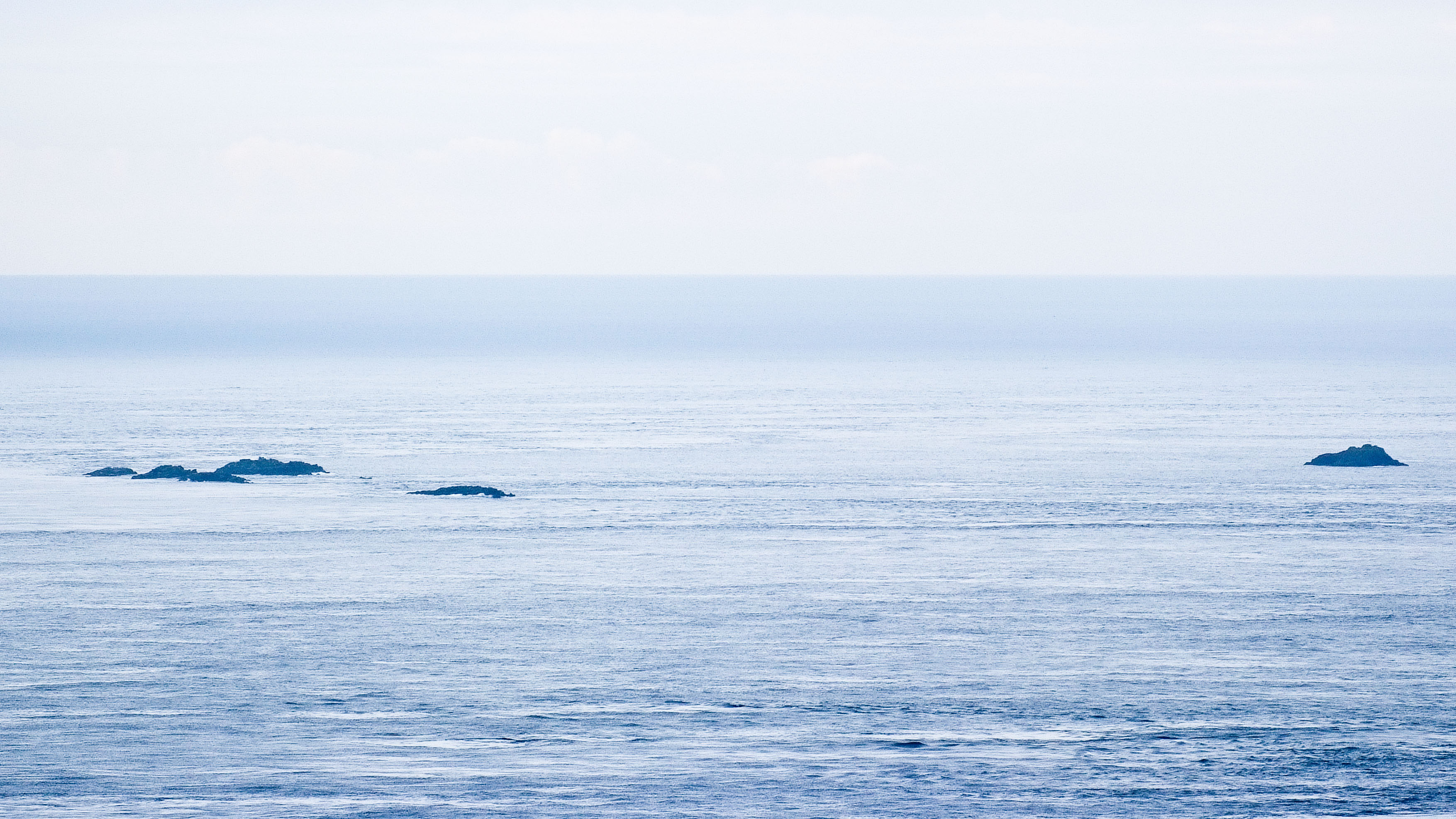
Flesjarnar, Munkurin is to the right on this photo, which was taken from Akraberg

Flesjarnar are a group of rocks, located 5 km south of Akraberg in Suðuroy. The rocks are:

- Sumbiarfles, 4 metres high (nearest to land)
- Miðjufles, 4 metres high (the word miðju means in the middle)
- Bøllufles, 6 metres high (two rocks)
- Stórafles, 7 metres high (Stóra means large)
- Munkurin or Sumbiarsteinur, 11 metres high

== Munkurin ==
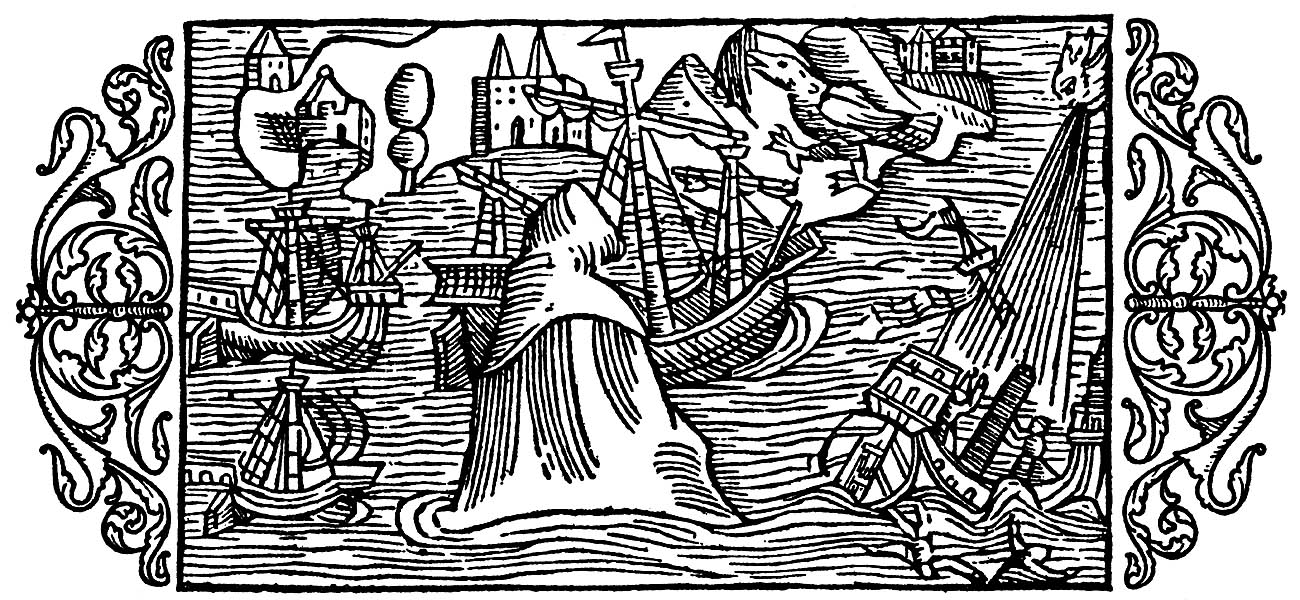
An excerpt from Olaus Magnus' A Description of the Northern Peoples.

The rocks are close together except for Munkurin, which is a little further away, which is possibly why it is called the Monk. Two sources mention another reason for the name Munkurin, referring to before the islet collapsed. The article tells about the observations of Pastor Jørgen Landt, written in 1800, that when seen from the land, the rock island presented the appearance of a monk with a red neck and a dark grey body and head, and from the sea, it looked like a ship under full sails. Another source, that of Olaus Magnus's Histora de Gentibus Septentrionalibus, states that the rock appeared to wear a hood over its "head," similar to that of a monk, as well as the fact that it provides safe refuge for those caught in a storm. The article mentions that the monk was 70 feet (21 metres) high. Munkurin is now 11 metres high, but it used to be higher. It collapsed in 1884-85. Before it collapsed, the northern gannet (Morus bassanus) used to nest there, but since it collapsed, the birds don't nest there anymore; they nest in Mykineshólmur. It happens sometimes that the rock looks white from the land, and that is because there are many northern gannets sitting there.

== Literature in German and Danish ==
- Lucas Jacobson Debes: Natürliche und Politische Historie der Inseln Färöe. The German book is translated from Danish. Writer: C. G. Mengel, Copenhagen / Leipzig, 1757.

== See also ==
- Extreme points of the Faroe Islands
