= Útoyggjar =

Islands in the Outer Periphery of the Faroe Islands

The Útoyggjar or Outer Islands are the islands in the Outer Periphery of the Faroe Islands. This includes the following islands: Fugloy, Svínoy, Kalsoy, Mykines, Hestur, Koltur, Skúvoy and Stóra Dímun, which have very poor connections to the rest of the country and cannot always be reached every day, often due to bad weather.
