= Cape Enniberg =

Cliff located on the Island of Viðoy

Coordinates: 62°23′N 6°34′W

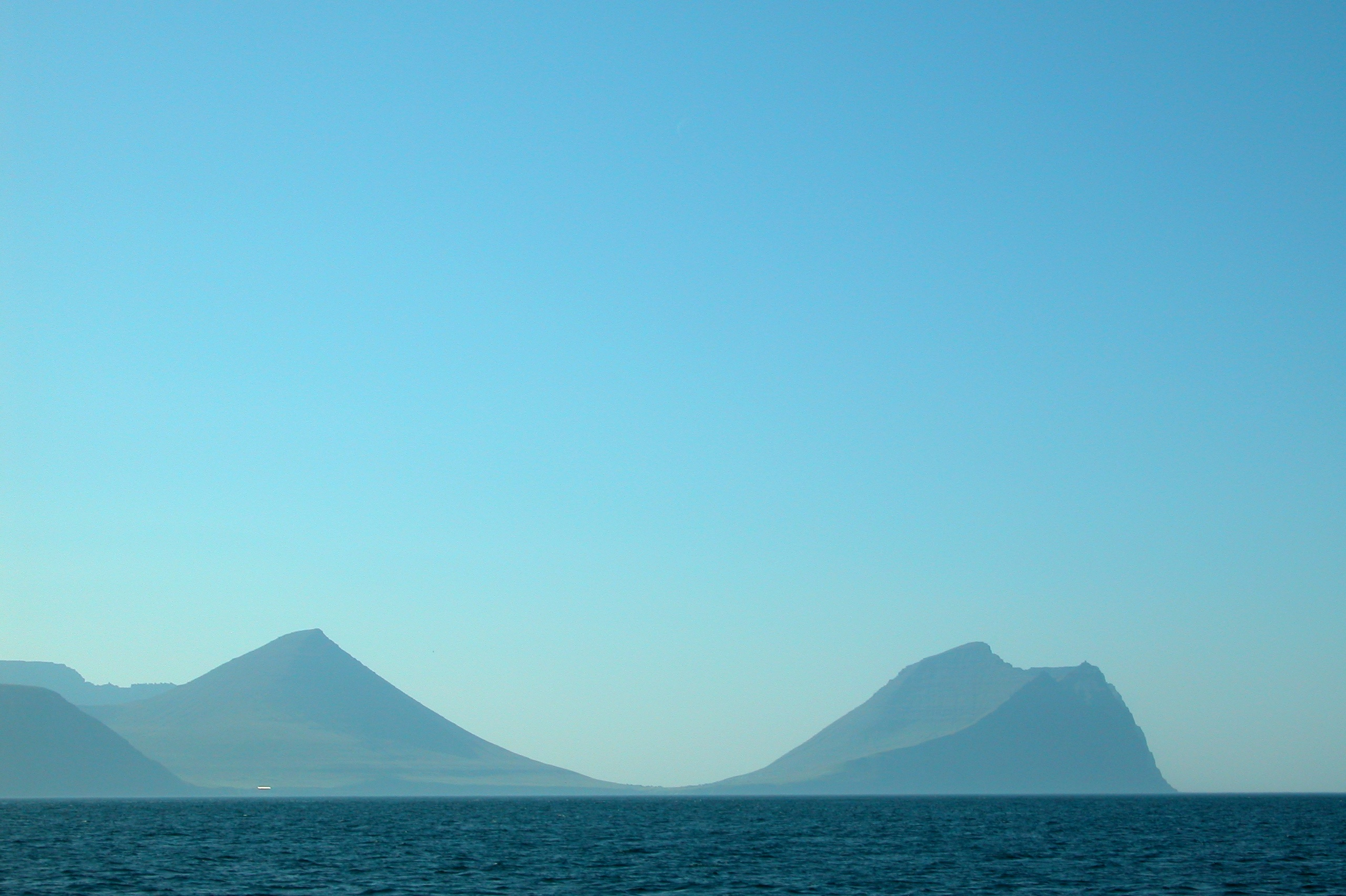
Enniberg (right)

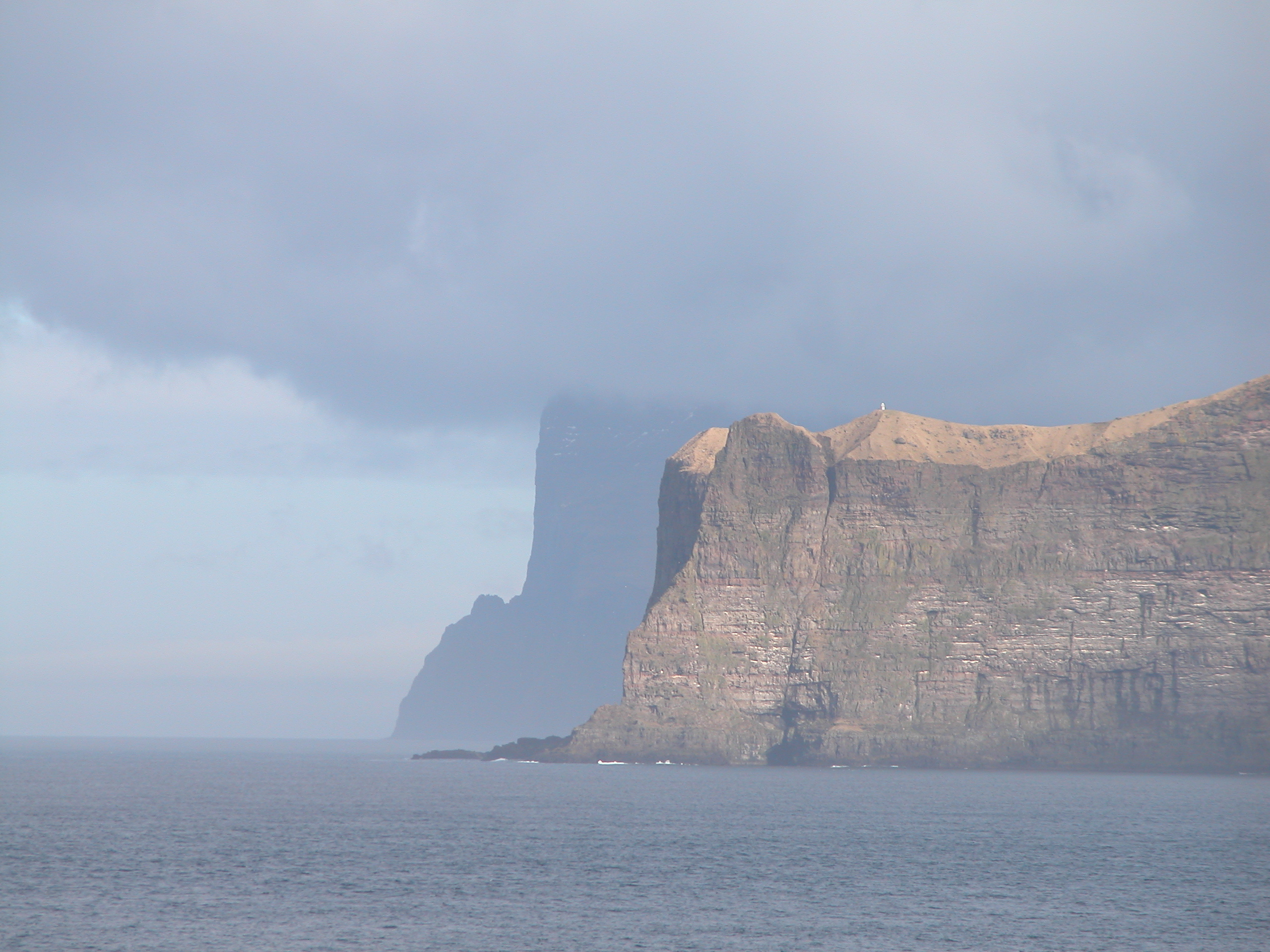
Enniberg (left)

Cape Enniberg is a cliff located on the Island of Viðoy. At 754 metres (2,474 ft) high, it is one of the highest promontories in the world.

Enniberg is the northernmost point of the Faroe Islands. At the southern foot of the nearby 844-metre-high (2,769 ft) mountain, Villingadalsfjall, lies the town of Viðareiði. In summer, boat trips run to Cape Enniberg, which is also the site of an important bird colony.

Comparison of cliffs in Europe

== See also ==
- Extreme points of the Faroe Islands
