= Mykines =

Mykines may refer to:

- Mykines, Faroe Islands, an island in the Faroe Islands
- Mykines, Mykines, a village on that island
- Mykines, Greece, a village in Argolis, Greece near ancient Mycenae
- The modern Greek name for Mycenae, an ancient archaeological site

== See also ==
- Sámal Joensen-Mikines, painter
