= Vørðufelli =

Mountain overlooking the village of Sørvágur on the Faroe Islands

Coordinates: 62°04′N 7°17′W

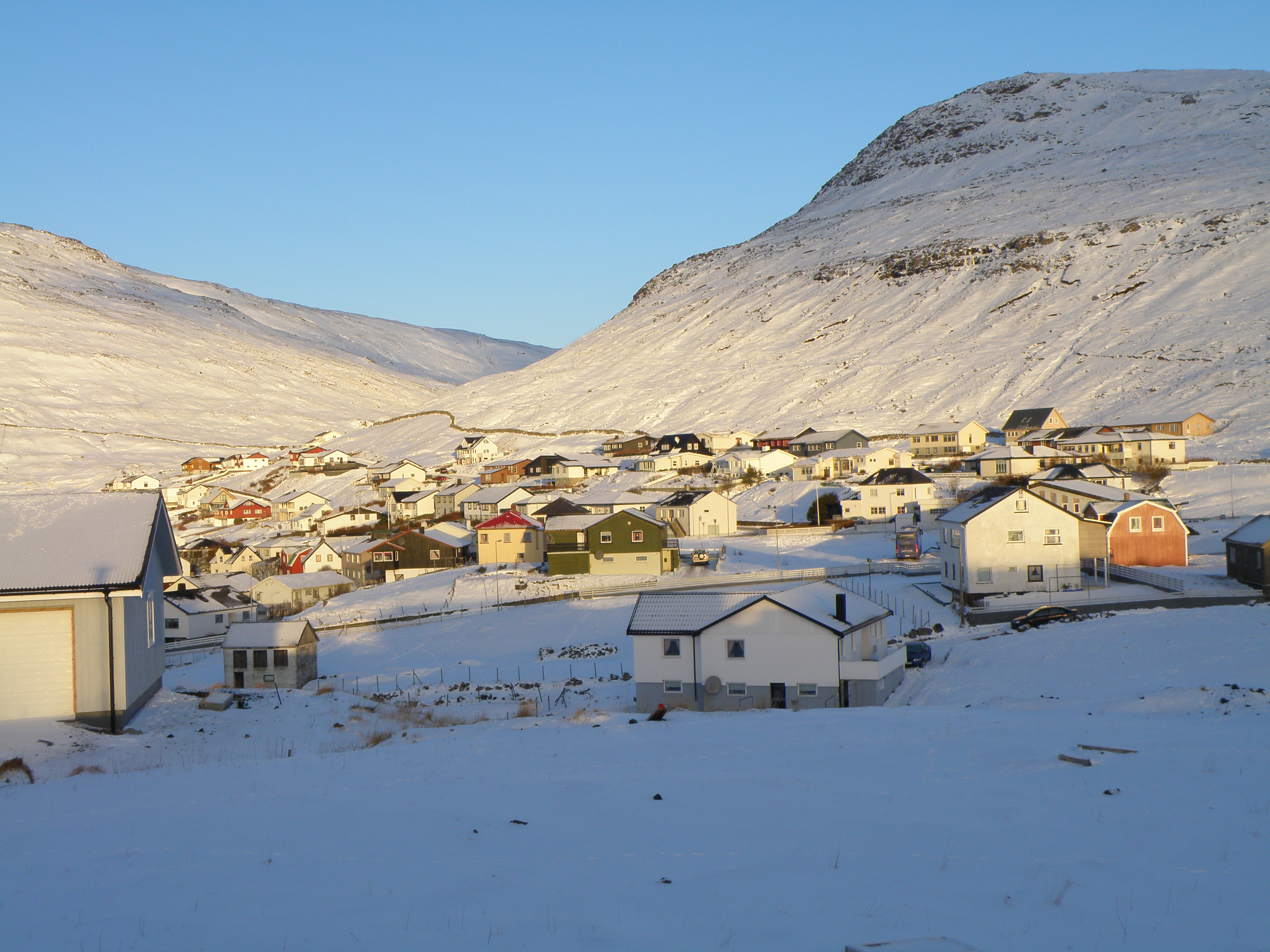
Sørvágur and the mountain Vørðufelli.

Vørðufelli is a mountain overlooking the village of Sørvágur on the Faroe Islands. Its height is 284 metres above sea level. It is situated between Húsadalur, Vága, Vatnsdalur, and close to Klovin.

The latter part of the name – felli – is Faroese for a small mountain, related to the English word 'fell' as in fell walking. 'Vørða' is a phrase used by Faroese regarding birdwatching. A 'Vørða' consists of five puffins, and since Vørðufelli is the fifth mountain on the north side of Sørvágsfirði, that explains how the mountain got its name.
