= List of airports in the Faroe Islands =

Location of airports and heliports in the Faroe Islands

This is a list of airports and heliports in the Faroe Islands, sorted by location.

The Faroe Islands are a group of islands in Northern Europe, between the Norwegian Sea and the north Atlantic Ocean, about halfway from Iceland to Norway. They have been an autonomous region of Denmark since 1948. There is one airport and a number of public heliports. The domestic helicopter services are operated by Atlantic Airways.

Location	ICAO	IATA	Airport name	Coordinates	Ref
Froðba	EKFA		Froðba Heliport	61°32′37″N 006°46′28″W	
Hattarvík	EKHI		Hattarvík Heliport	62°19′49″N 006°16′36″W	
Kirkja	EKKU		Kirkja Heliport	62°19′02″N 006°18′48″W	
Klaksvík	EKKV		Klaksvík Heliport	62°13′04″N 006°34′35″W	
Koltur	N/A		Koltur Heliport	61.984601°N 6.963484°W	
Mykines	EKMS		Mykines Heliport	62°06′08″N 007°38′45″W	
Skopun	N/A		Skopun Heliport	61.904545°N 6.884192°W	
Skúvoy	EKSY		Skúvoy Heliport	61°46′10″N 006°48′13″W	
Sørvágur	EKVG	FAE	Vágar Airport	62°03′49″N 007°16′38″W	
Stóra Dímun	EKSR		Stóra Dímun Heliport	61°41′07″N 006°45′31″W	
Svínoy	EKSO		Svínoy Heliport	62°16′36″N 006°20′29″W	
Tórshavn	EKTB		Boðanes Heliport	62°01′18″N 006°45′27″W	
Tórshavn	N/A		Faroe Islands National Hospital Helipad	62.001588°N 6.774736°W	

Koltur also has a helipad that is used for scheduled passenger flights ran by Atlantic Airways. Skopun and Tórshavn (a second one, near the hospital) have helipads used for ambulance flights. Abandoned heliports are found in Trøllanes, Gásadalur and Múli, all of which were dismantled soon after the respective roads to these villages opened. Discussions about a helipad in Nólsoy for the purpose of medical evacuations aired in 2014 and continue to play.

Tórshavn's municipal plan includes a proposal for a new airport at Glyvursnes, due south of the suburb Argir, but the cost and political situation make this unlikely in the foreseeable future. The runway and terminal at Vágar Airport have recently (2011) been extended and upgraded respectively, and the airport forms an important part of the economy of the island of Vágar.

== See also ==
- List of airports in Denmark
- Transport in the Faroe Islands
- List of airports by ICAO code: EH-EY#EK – Denmark and the Faroe Islands
- Wikipedia: Airline destination lists: Europe#Faroe Islands (Denmark)
- List of the busiest airports in the Nordic countries
