= Líðarnøva =

Mountain range above the village of Sørvágur on the Faroe Islands

Líðarnøva is a mountain range above the village of Sørvágur on the Faroe Islands. Norðurvarði is placed on top of the mountain.
