= Stórá (Sørvágur) =

River which runs through the village of Sørvágur in the Faroe Islands

Stórá is a river which runs through the village of Sørvágur in the Faroe Islands.
