= Kirkjuá =

River which runs through the village of Sørvágur in the Faroe Islands

Kirkjuá is a river which runs through the village of Sørvágur in the Faroe Islands. The name Kirkjuá translates to 'Church river', and the name of the river comes from the fact that it runs in proximity to the church in Sørvágur.

Kirkjuá runs through the valley of Húsadalur and out to the sea.
