= List of twin towns and sister cities in the Faroe Islands =

Map of the Faroe Islands

This is a list of places in Faroe Islands having standing links to local communities in other countries. In most cases, the association, especially when formalised by local government, is known as "town twinning" (though other terms, such as "partner towns" or "sister cities" are sometimes used instead), and while most of the places included are towns, the list also comprises villages, cities, districts, counties, etc. with similar links.

== E ==
Eiði

- Arsuk, Greenland
- Countryside, Åland Islands, Finland
- Herning, Denmark
- Holmestrand, Norway
- Husby, Germany
- Kangasala, Finland
- Siglufjörður, Iceland
- Vänersborg, Sweden

== F ==
Fuglafjørður

- Aalborg, Denmark
- Ilulissat (Avannaata), Greenland
- Norðurþing, Iceland

== K ==
Klaksvík

- Kópavogur, Iceland
- Norrköping, Sweden
- Odense, Denmark
- Qeqqata, Greenland
- Saint Petersburg, Russia
- Taiji, Japan
- Tampere, Finland
- Trondheim, Norway
- Wick, Scotland, United Kingdom

== R ==
Runavík

- Fljótsdalshérað, Iceland
- Hjørring, Denmark
- Ísafjarðarbær, Iceland
- Uummannaq, Greenland

== S ==
Sørvágur

- Akranes, Iceland

== T ==
Tórshavn

- Esbjerg, Denmark
- Frederiksberg, Denmark
- Mariehamn, Åland Islands, Finland
- Nuuk, Greenland
- Reykjavík, Iceland

Tvøroyri

- Hafnarfjörður, Iceland

== V ==
Vágar

- Fjarðabyggð, Iceland

Vágur

- Akureyri, Iceland

Vestmanna

- Snæfellsbær, Iceland
