= Mykines, Mykines =

Mykines
- Village
- Location in the Faroe Islands
- Coordinates: 62°06′15″N 7°38′46″W
- State: Kingdom of Denmark
- Constituent country: Faroe Islands
- Island: Mykines
- Municipality: Sørvágur

Population (30 April 2025)
  - Total: 12
- Time zone: GMT
  - Summer (DST): UTC+1 (EST)
- Postal code: FO 388
- Climate: ET

Mykines (Faroese: /ˈmiːtʃɪˌneːs/; Danish: Myggenæs) is the only settlement on Mykines Island, the westernmost of the Faroe Islands. It is a little coastal village with bright houses with turf roofs, with an old turf-roofed stone Church dating from 1878, and a small stream flowing through the village.

== Population ==
The population reached about 179 in 1925 and was still 150 in 1953. Since then it has decreased, and it now fluctuates during the year with a permanent population of around twenty people being supplemented during summer when families who used to live on the island return to their houses for the summer vacation.

Population of Mykines
Year	1769	1801	1834	1840	1845	1855	1870	1890	1925	1940	1953	1977	1996	2001	2006	2009	2012
Population	61	74	92	97	99	112	114	154	179	120	150	30	16	22	20	17	14

== Transport ==
=== Land ===
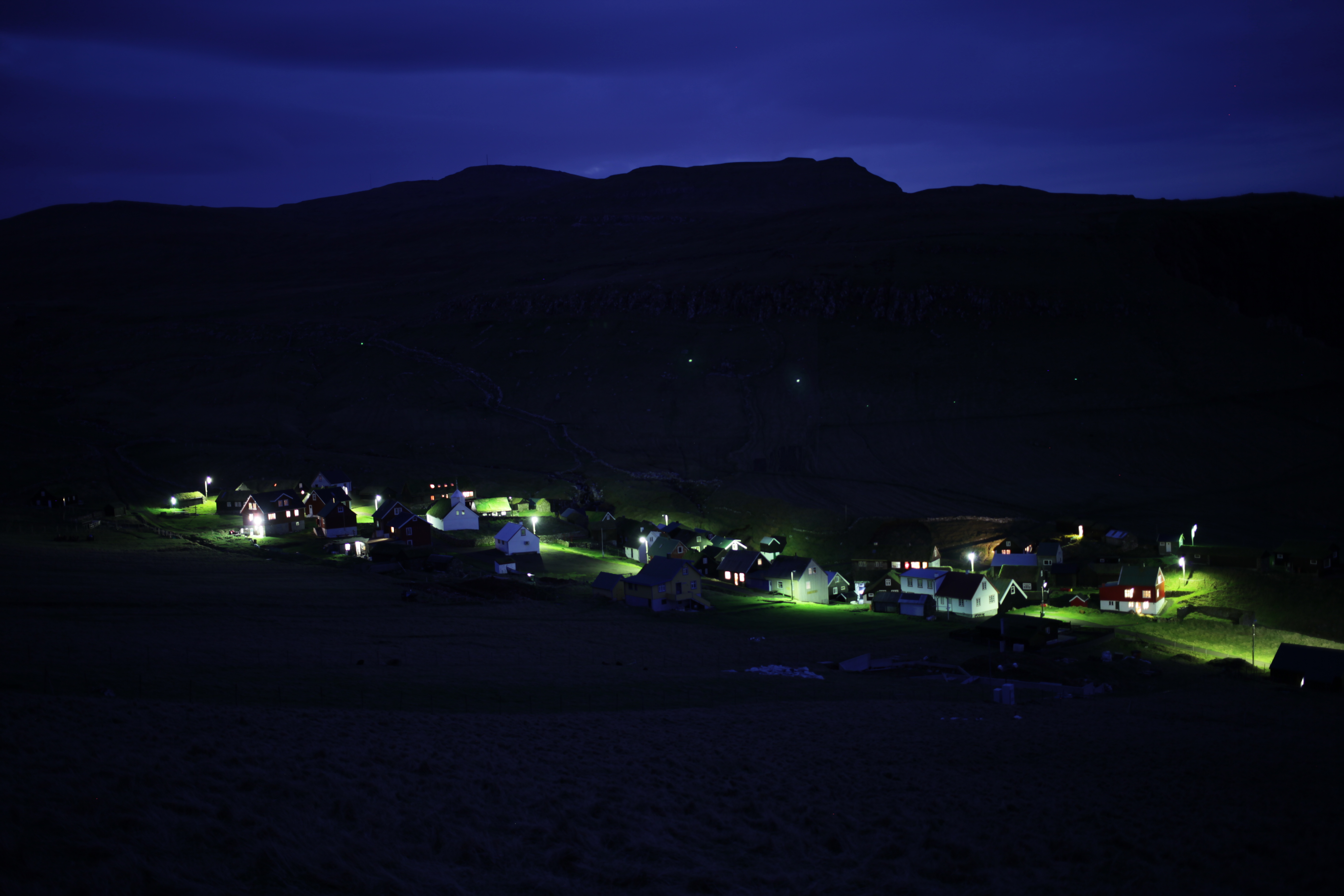
Mykines view from the hill in the night.

Mykines Island has no roads: access to other parts of the island is on foot, using well-used footpaths. Although Mykines village does have asphalted streets, there are not any conventional cars on the islands. Residents usually rely on all-terrain vehicles to transport heavier goods around the village.

=== Sea ===
The village has a small harbour, though the regularity of ferry services can be disrupted by inclement weather. A small ferry visits one to three times a day from 1 May to 31 August and again in one week of October, when the Faroese schools have a holiday (and only if the weather allows it). The ferry is run by a private company and not like the other ferries by the public bus and ferry company Strandfaraskip Landsins (SSL).

Every year boat owners can make an offer to SSL in order to run the ferry to Mykines. In 2015 there was one boat called M/B Jósup, which transported tourists and locals from Sørvágur to Mykines and back again. During winter there is no ferry service, only helicopter service.

From the harbour a steep footpath leads up to the village, but there is also a simple funicular for goods transport. Some cruise ships visit Mykines, but they need to anchor at sea and use small boats to get ashore.

=== Air ===
It is possible to reach Mykines three to four times a week by helicopter operated by Atlantic Airways: Sunday, Wednesday and Fridays. In June, July and August it is also possible to take the helicopter to Mykines on Mondays. They go from Vágar Airport to Mykines and back. When there is no boat, it is not possible for residents to leave Mykines and come back same day. There is a simple helipad at Mykines.

== Climate ==
Mykines has a Tundra climate (Köppen climate classification ET), an oddity in most of the Faroe Islands, which mostly has a Subpolar oceanic climate (Köppen climate classification Cfc).

Climate data for Mykines, 105 m.a.s.l. (1961-1969)
Month	Jan	Feb	Mar	Apr	May	Jun	Jul	Aug	Sep	Oct	Nov	Dec	Year
Record high °C (°F)	9.0 (48.2)	9.5 (49.1)	10.0 (50.0)	12.5 (54.5)	13.0 (55.4)	15.0 (59.0)	16.0 (60.8)	16.0 (60.8)	14.0 (57.2)	11.5 (52.7)	10.6 (51.1)	9.5 (49.1)	16.0 (60.8)
Mean daily maximum °C (°F)	5.1 (41.2)	5.1 (41.2)	5.2 (41.4)	6.6 (43.9)	8.0 (46.4)	10.2 (50.4)	10.9 (51.6)	11.3 (52.3)	10.2 (50.4)	8.8 (47.8)	6.0 (42.8)	4.9 (40.8)	7.7 (45.9)
Daily mean °C (°F)	3.5 (38.3)	3.5 (38.3)	3.5 (38.3)	4.8 (40.6)	6.2 (43.2)	8.5 (47.3)	9.2 (48.6)	9.6 (49.3)	8.7 (47.7)	7.4 (45.3)	4.6 (40.3)	3.3 (37.9)	6.1 (43.0)
Mean daily minimum °C (°F)	1.7 (35.1)	1.5 (34.7)	1.5 (34.7)	3.0 (37.4)	4.7 (40.5)	7.1 (44.8)	7.8 (46.0)	8.2 (46.8)	7.3 (45.1)	5.7 (42.3)	2.7 (36.9)	1.5 (34.7)	4.4 (39.9)
Record low °C (°F)	−7.0 (19.4)	−11.0 (12.2)	−8.0 (17.6)	−10.0 (14.0)	−2.6 (27.3)	1.0 (33.8)	4.1 (39.4)	4.2 (39.6)	0.4 (32.7)	−5.0 (23.0)	−7.0 (19.4)	−7.0 (19.4)	−11.0 (12.2)
Average precipitation mm (inches)	77 (3.0)	56 (2.2)	88 (3.5)	53 (2.1)	31 (1.2)	49 (1.9)	47 (1.9)	61 (2.4)	96 (3.8)	95 (3.7)	80 (3.1)	90 (3.5)	823 (32.4)
Average precipitation days (≥ 0.1 mm)	25	21	26	21	19	20	21	21	23	26	26	28	278
Average relative humidity (%)	82	81	83	83	84	87	86	87	85	84	81	80	84
Source: Danish Meteorological Institute

== People from Mykines ==
The first professional Faroese painter, S. J. Mikines was born in the village and drew inspiration from Mykines.

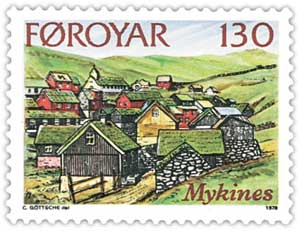
The village of Mykines Stamp FR 26 of the Faroe Islands Issued: 26 January 1978 Graphical art by Charles Göttsche

== Economy ==
The economy is based on sheep farming and on tourism.

== History ==
A brief history of Mykines can be summarised as follows:

- 625 - pollen analysis indicates oats and barley were grown on Mykines, possibly by early settlers such as monks and hermits
- 1538 - the Reformation under King Christian III of Denmark
- 1592 - Peter Claussøn Friis, a Norwegian priest, described the Faroese mouse as a distinct species, and the Mykines mouse as a subgroup having especially long powerful hind legs
- 1595 - (approx) on 25 April, fifty boats were shipwrecked in a sudden storm and all the working men of Mykines lost their lives (estimated 200 to 300 men)
- 1667 - Dutch ship Walcheren was wrecked on Mykines and the islanders gained goods from the ship
- 1757 - a man lost his life birding
- 1769 - records show 61 inhabitants on Mykines
- 1792 - two men from Mykines lost their lives birding, possibly through being roped together; the practice of roping men together was discontinued after this
- 1801 - population 74 in 17 houses
- 1819 - a ship abandoned by its crew drifted ashore and the people got some timber
- 1845 - population 99 in 19 houses
- 1862 - (approx) the first fulmar chicks were caught and eaten
- 1863 - Church was destroyed by a storm
- 1877 - Church again destroyed by a storm
- 1879 - new Church completed and consecrated
- 1890 - population 154
- 1892 - two young men lost their lives birding. About this time, adult fulmars started to be caught for food
- 1895 - 26 January a boat from Mykines was shipwrecked and all six men on board lose their lives
- 1896 - Mykines school opened
- 1906 - famous painter S J Mikines was born on 22 February, baptised Samuel Elias Frederik Joensen, but later changed his name to Mikines
- 1909 - building of the Lighthouse on Mykines Holm and construction of the first bridge over Holmgjogv, the narrow strait between Mykines and Mykines Holm
- 1911 - 1 October Mykines made its own municipality with 3 members on the town council
- 1925 - population 179, with 27 pupils in the school
- 1927 - the first swimming pool on the Faroes was built on Mykines, just downstream of the waterfall in the north-east part of the village. Poul N. Pedersen, the school teacher, was the driving force behind the project, and he organised sport competitions on the island
- 1927 - telephone service proposed but considered too expensive; an alternative facility via a communications link between the lighthouses on Mykines and Nolsoy was agreed
- 1928 - radio beacons were installed at Nólsoy and Mykines lighthouses, making radio navigation possible for the first time, and Mykines got a telephone connection to the outside world
- 1934 - 7 8 March Mykines men were among the 43 casualties when two ships from Tórshavn were shipwrecked off Iceland. A memorial stands above the village.
- 1939 - a memorial listing Mykines people lost at sea was consecrated and can be seen in the Church
- 1940 - first signs of war: unknown aircraft sighted. British military ordered all lighthouses to be switched off. Population 120.
- 1941 - three air attacks damaged the lighthouse on Mykines Holm; assistant lighthouse keeper was wounded and was treated in Tórshavn hospital. The radio station was out of action for a short period
- 1942 - in spring British forces completed a radar station on á Ólakletti in Liðarhaugi. In September a mine drifted ashore on Mykines, exploded and damaged some boathouses
- 1943 - the first wavebreakers at the landing-place was built, entirely from hand-mixed concrete
- 1945 - 17 May: lighthouses were switched on again and the radio transmission on Mykines and Nolsoy was resumed
- 1950 - the second (outer) wavebreaker was built, again from hand-mixed concrete
- 1953 - the second bridge over Holm Gjogv was built. Population about 150.
- 1959 - a man fell to his death while sheep herding
- 1961 - work started to build a ramp to haul the boats ashore in winter; the work extended over the summers of three years
- 1963 - a man fell to his death while sheep herding
- 1968 - Mykines power station was opened - the generators were started by the oldest inhabitant of Mykines at that time, Niclas Hansen, who was 94 years old
- 1968 - visit by Princess Margrethe and Prince Henrik of Denmark
- 1970 - A Fokker F27 Friendship, with registration TF-FIL, from Flugfélag Íslands on flight from Bergen to Vágar Airport, crashed in bad weather on Mykines on 26 September. The captain and 7 passengers, all seated on the left side of the plane, where killed instantly. 26 passengers and crew survived, some with serious injuries. Three passengers hiked for an hour to reach Mykines village to alert the authorities. Most of the villagers went up the mountain to aid the survivors before the arrival of the Danish patrol vessel F348 Hvidbjørnen. A marble memorial was placed in the Church.
- 1970 - Mykines lighthouse was automated and the last man moved from the Holm, which had been occupied continuously from 1909 by a varying population of up to 22 people (including children).
- 1971 - Danish Navy Alouette helicopter brought Christmas mail on 23 December since no boat had been able to land for some time due to bad weather. The helicopter engine failed so the crew stayed for Christmas. Mechanics flew in from Denmark on 28 December in two Sikorsky S-61 helicopters and repaired the Alouette. One Sikorsky could not leave because of technical problems, but the other two helicopters left on 2 January.
- 1979-80 - new radio beacon and telecommunications facility constructed high on the island; materials transported by helicopter
- 1981 - trial of scheduled passenger transportation by helicopter between July and October
- 1981 - Anker Jørgensen, Prime Minister of Denmark, visited the island by helicopter on 20 August
- 1983 - permanent scheduled passenger flights between the smaller islands started and has continued ever since
- 1987 - a new ferry boat came into service - called Sulan like its 1927 predecessor
- 1989 - the third bridge between Mykines and Mykines Holm came into use in June
- 1990 - roads in Mykines village were asphalted
- 1990 - Queen Margrethe of Denmark and Prince Henrik visited on 20 June
- 1991 - three men lost their lives in a shipwreck south of Mykines
- 1992 - hotel Kristianshus was inaugurated on 17 May; forty people were flown to Mykines by helicopter for the reception, including the Faroese minister for tourism
- 1999 - Poul Nyrup Rasmussen, Prime Minister of Denmark, and Jonathan Motzfeldt, the Greenlandic "landsstyreformand" visited Mykines on 9 August
- 2001 - the Icelandic president and the Faroese "lagmand" visited Mykines

== See also ==
- List of towns in the Faroe Islands
- Mykines
