= Faroese Pilot Association =

FAPA
- Faroese Pilot Association
- Flogskiparafelag Føroya
- Key people: Rúni Højgaard, President

The Faroese Pilot Association (Faroese: Flogskiparafelag Føroya) is the national trade union of pilots in the Faroe Islands, covering all kinds of pilots (nationals as well as foreigners, fixed-wing and helicopter aircraft), especially those working for Atlantic Airways, the national airline. In March 2019, the union signed a four-year agreement with the employer's association; the agreement gives a 3.26% pay rise in 2019 and 2.56% in 2020, with subsequent years to be negotiated.
