= Jóhanna á Bergi =

Faroese businesswoman

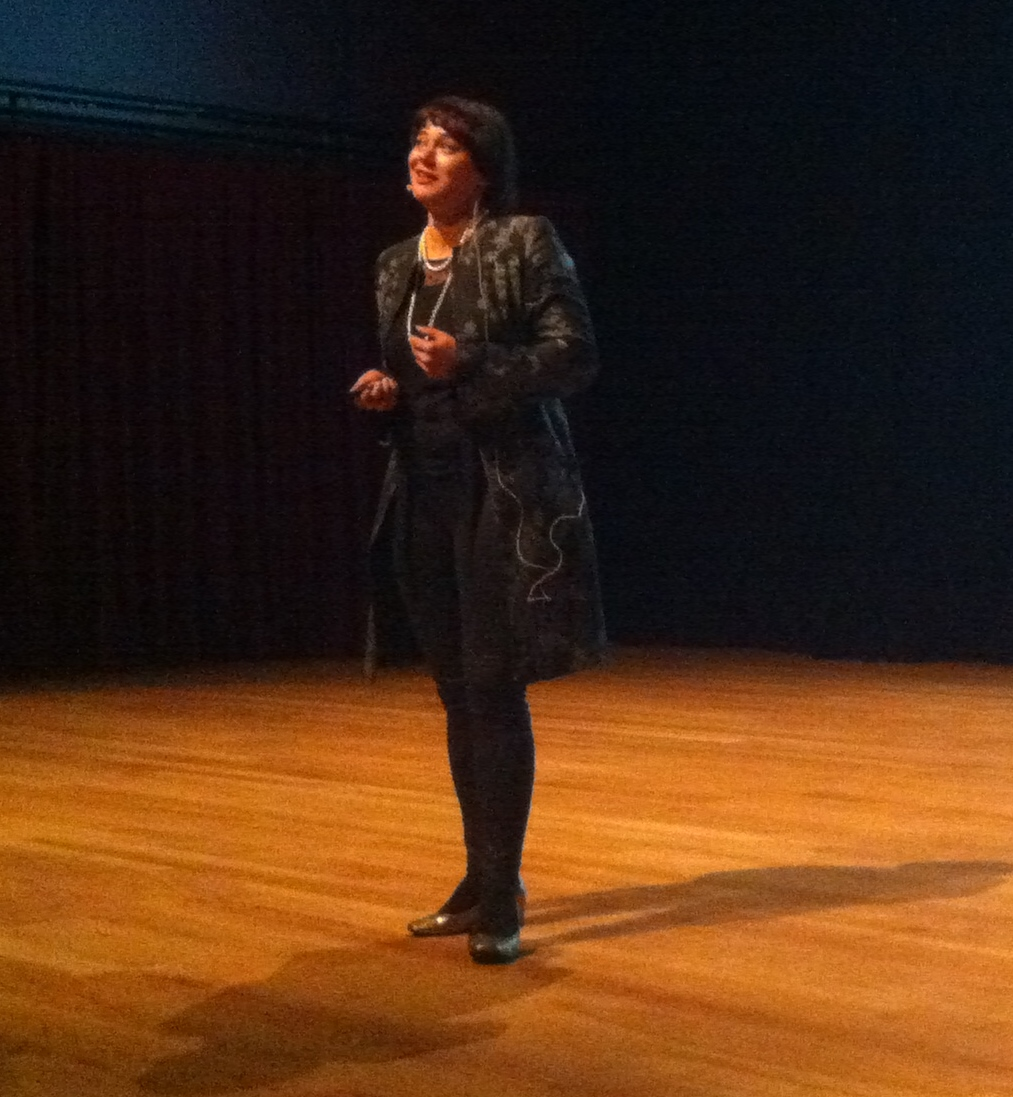
Jóhanna á Bergi speaking in 2015.

Jóhanna á Bergi (born 1970, in London) is a Faroese businesswoman. On 3 June 2015, she became CEO of Atlantic Airways. She is the first woman to become the CEO of a Nordic airline. She officially assumed the position on 1 September 2015. Bergi had previously served as the CEO of P/f Faroe Ship, from 2006 until 2015.

She began her business career as the sales manager of Faroe Seafood France, a position she held from 1994 until 1998. In that year, she became a sales director of JFD and Kósin Seafood, where she remained until 2006; during the same period she served as sales and marketing director for JFK.

Bergi received her degree in Export and Marketing from the Danish School of International Marketing and Export in 1994, following by a master's degree in management from Robert Gordon University in Aberdeen in 2004.
