= Húsadalur =

Valley in the Faroe Islands

This place should not be confused with Húsadalur in Iceland.

Húsadalur is a small valley in the village of Sørvágur on the Faroe Islands. The name Húsadalur translates to 'the valley of the houses'. In modern times there are no houses in the valley, but the name suggests that people have lived there in the past.

There is a dam in Húsadalur which provides drinking water to Sørvág.

The river Kirkjuá runs through Húsadal.
