= Atlantic Airways =

Flag carrier airline of the Faroe Islands

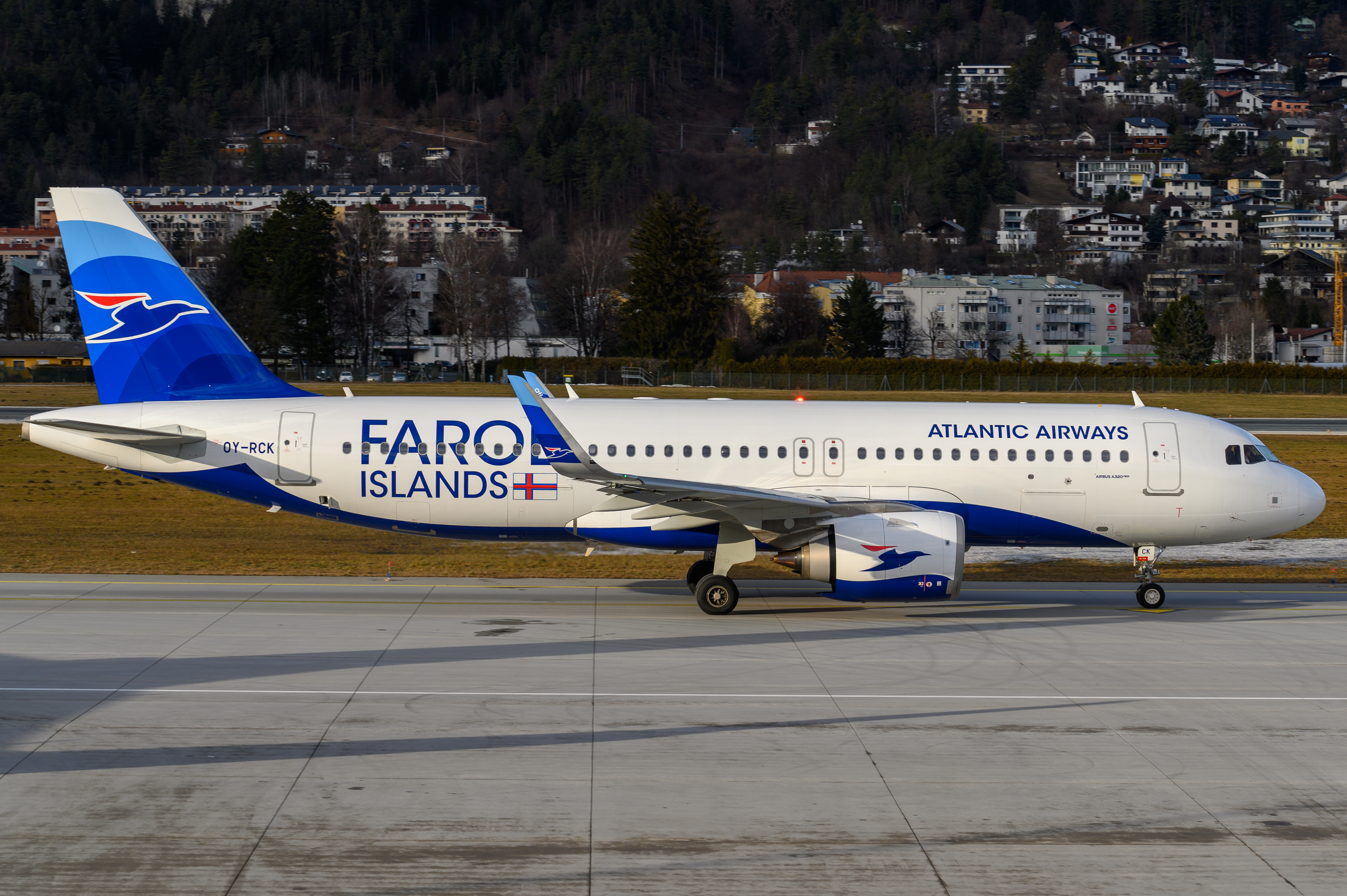
- Atlantic Airways Airbus A320neo
IATA	ICAO	Call sign
RC	FLI	FAROELINE
- Founded: 10 November 1987; 38 years ago
- Hubs: Vágar Airport
- Frequent-flyer program: Súlubonus
- Fleet size: 4
- Destinations: 12
- Headquarters: Sørvágur, Faroe Islands
- Key people: Jóhanna á Bergi (CEO)
- Revenue: DKK 410.2 million (2021)
- Website: www.atlanticairways.com

Atlantic Airways (Faroese: Atlantsflog) is the national airline of the Faroe Islands, operating domestic helicopter services and international passenger services as well as search and rescue operations from its base at Vágar Airport, on the Faroese island of Vágar. Most of its pilots are members of the Faroese Pilot Association. Its 2021 revenue was 410.2mm DKK.

== History ==
Regular scheduled air links to the Faroes had been in operation with Icelandair from 1963, between the islands, Denmark, Scotland and Iceland. Although the airport at Vágar had been constructed by the British Army during World War II, air traffic to the islands was limited in the 1960s. In 1971, more regular services to Copenhagen began with Maersk Air. Calls for the creation of a Faroese airline company began in the early 1980s. Passenger numbers were steadily increasing, and Danish carrier Maersk Air enjoyed the monopoly as the sole airline to serve the Faroe Islands.

As a result, Atlantic Airways was established in 1987, initially between the Faroese government (51%) and Danish airline Cimber Air (49%), though the Faroese government would assume full ownership in 1989. Flights commenced between Vágar and Copenhagen on 28 March 1988 using a British Aerospace 146. A hangar was built at Vágar by the Faroese government in order to secure Atlantic Airways' home base in the Faroes, ensuring maintenance facilities were available on the islands.

The new airline company aimed to build up a Faroese aviation industry on a commercial basis and to ensure the Faroe Islands an air connection with the outside world. Flight crews and management were Faroese.

Though load factors were high and the new service was popular, Atlantic Airways had a turbulent beginning economically. The Faroe Islands suffered a severe economic depression in the early 1990s, and at its nadir in 1992, the Faroese government delivered 75 m DKK in aid to the struggling carrier. Atlantic Airways would not become profitable until 1995.

Flights were launched to Reykjavík in 1995 in co-operation with Icelandair, and also to Narsarsuaq in Greenland in the summer months, in co-operation with Icelandair. The latter half of the 1990s saw Billund in Denmark and Aberdeen in the UK added to Atlantic Airways' flight schedule. In 2004, Icelandair ceased operating its own flights to Vágar, albeit retaining its partnership with Atlantic Airways. Maersk Air also ceased flights to Vágar in 2004, leaving Atlantic Airways as the only regularly scheduled operator to the Faroe Islands.

The growing list of destinations and increasing passenger numbers, together with the stabilisation of the airline's finances, saw a second BAe 146 added to the fleet in 2000. This new aircraft meant services to London Stansted in England and the Norwegian capital Oslo added to the network. Growth in tourism on the islands has also enabled flights to Aalborg, Stavanger, Stord and Edinburgh. However, for the 2006 season, services to Stord have been discontinued, and Edinburgh replaced by the Shetland Islands. Atlantic Airways also entered the UK domestic market in 2006, becoming the only carrier to offer a direct service between Shetland and London, which it did on a twice-weekly basis. The UK domestic operation ceased in 2008.

Atlantic Airways also operates a domestic service by helicopter, in many instances a vital connection to many of the islands, which otherwise can only be reached by sea. The helicopter has proved a vital tool on the islands since the 1960s, when helicopters from Danish coast guard vessels patrolling the Faroes undertook a variety of tasks, including ferrying equipment and supplies between the islands. The government hired a helicopter in 1978 for these tasks, but in the 1980s, a commercial public helicopter service was launched linking each of the islands using two Bell 212 helicopters.

Initially, the helicopter service was a standalone company, SL Helicopters, but the decision to concentrate Faroese aviation into one firm led to the helicopter department becoming part of Atlantic Airways in 1994. The helicopters provide a round-trip 'hopper' service to each of the islands, which is also ideal for tourists looking for aerial views. The company is required to have at least one helicopter operational and ready for search and rescue duties.

From approximately 2002 to 2007, Atlantic Airways produced profits of between 8 and 13 million DKK. The company has increased its turnover from 120 million in 1998 to 520 million DKK in 2006. Atlantic Airways employed 177 people in January 2007. Atlantic Airways was listed on the Iceland Stock Exchange on 10 December 2007.

The Faroese government has decided on a privatisation process and has sold off 33% of the company in the first bidding round. The first day of trading was 10 December 2007.

The government had planned to sell 33% more in 2008, but this was cancelled due to the 2008 financial crisis.

The first Airbus A319 for Atlantic Airways, registered OY-RCG, entered service in March 2012, with a modified livery. The runway at Vágar required an extension to properly accommodate this aircraft. The second and third Airbus 319s (OY-RCH and OY-RCI) entered service in May and October 2013, respectively. As the leases of these ran out by the end of 2016, only one was renewed while a brand new Airbus A320 was delivered.

On 3 June 2015, Jóhanna á Bergi became CEO of the company. She is the first woman to become CEO of a Nordic airline.

In December 2018, the airline submitted an application for commercial services to the United States. As Atlantic Airways transitioned their fleet from Airbus A319s to A320s, they moved their Iceland flights to Keflavík International Airport in 2018, due to aircraft size restrictions at Reykjavík Airport.

On 13 March 2020, Atlantic Airways announced the suspension of all routes until 13 April 2020 except the route to Copenhagen due to the COVID-19 pandemic.

On 22 August 2023, Atlantic Airways started to operate seven-hour flight weekly scheduled nonstop service between the U.S. and the Faroe Islands with service to the Faroe Islands on Wednesdays and flights to Stewart International Airport on Tuesdays. The carrier, which operates the route with Airbus A320neo, is the only one to use the aircraft type on transatlantic flights. As of November 2024, flights to North America have been terminated, with no plans to restart.

== Destinations ==
=== International services ===
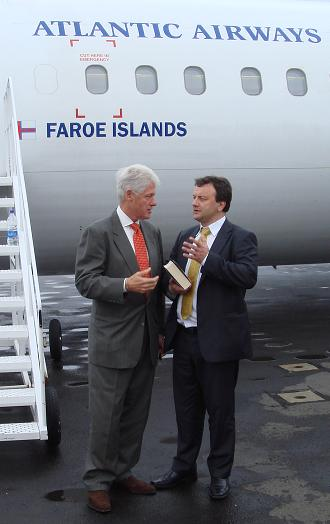
Former US President Bill Clinton and former Atlantic Airways President Magni Arge at Vágar Airport, before flying to Copenhagen

As of November 2024, Atlantic Airways serves the following scheduled destinations:

Country	City	Airport	Notes	Refs
Denmark	Aalborg	Aalborg Airport	Seasonal	
Denmark	Aarhus	Aarhus Airport	Terminated	
Denmark	Billund	Billund Airport	Base	
Denmark	Copenhagen	Copenhagen Airport	Base	
Faroe Islands	Vágar	Vágar Airport	Base	
France	Paris	Charles de Gaulle Airport	Seasonal	
Greenland	Narsarsuaq	Narsarsuaq Airport	Terminated	
Iceland	Reykjavík	Keflavík International Airport		
Iceland	Reykjavík	Reykjavík Airport	Terminated	
Italy	Milan	Milan Malpensa Airport	Terminated	
Italy	Rome	Rome Fiumicino Airport	Terminated	
Norway	Bergen	Bergen Airport, Flesland	Terminated	
Norway	Oslo	Oslo Airport, Gardermoen		
Norway	Stavanger	Stavanger Airport	Terminated	
Norway	Trondheim	Trondheim Airport	Terminated	
Portugal	Lisbon	Lisbon Airport	Terminated	
Spain	Barcelona	Josep Tarradellas Barcelona–El Prat Airport	Seasonal	
Spain	Gran Canaria	Gran Canaria Airport	Seasonal	
Spain	Mallorca	Palma de Mallorca Airport	Seasonal	
Spain	Tenerife	Tenerife South Airport	Terminated	
Sweden	Stockholm	Stockholm Arlanda Airport	Terminated	
United Kingdom	London	Gatwick Airport	Seasonal	
United Kingdom	London	London Stansted Airport	Terminated	
United Kingdom	Aberdeen	Aberdeen Airport	Terminated	
United Kingdom	Edinburgh	Edinburgh Airport	Seasonal	
United Kingdom	Sumburgh	Sumburgh Airport	Terminated	
United States	Newburgh	Stewart International Airport	Terminated	

=== Charter operations ===
Atlantic Airways also operates charters for Danish tour operators to destinations such as Italy, Portugal (Porto Santo), Croatia, Greece, Bulgaria, France, Scotland, Norway and the Czech Republic, out of Copenhagen Kastrup and Billund airports.

=== Domestic services ===
There is domestic helicopter service to the islands. The helicopters depart from Vágar Airport on Sunday, Monday (only in June, July, & August), Wednesday, and Friday.

The flights visit the capital Tórshavn and second largest town Klaksvík, the southern islands Skúvoy, Stóra Dímun, Suðuroy (Froðba), the northern islands Svínoy and Fugloy (Hattarvík and Kirkja) and the western island Mykines.

=== Codeshare agreements ===
Atlantic Airways currently has codeshare agreements with the following airlines:

- Air France
- Icelandair
- KLM

=== Interline agreements ===
- Hahn Air

== Fleet ==
=== Current fixed-wing fleet ===
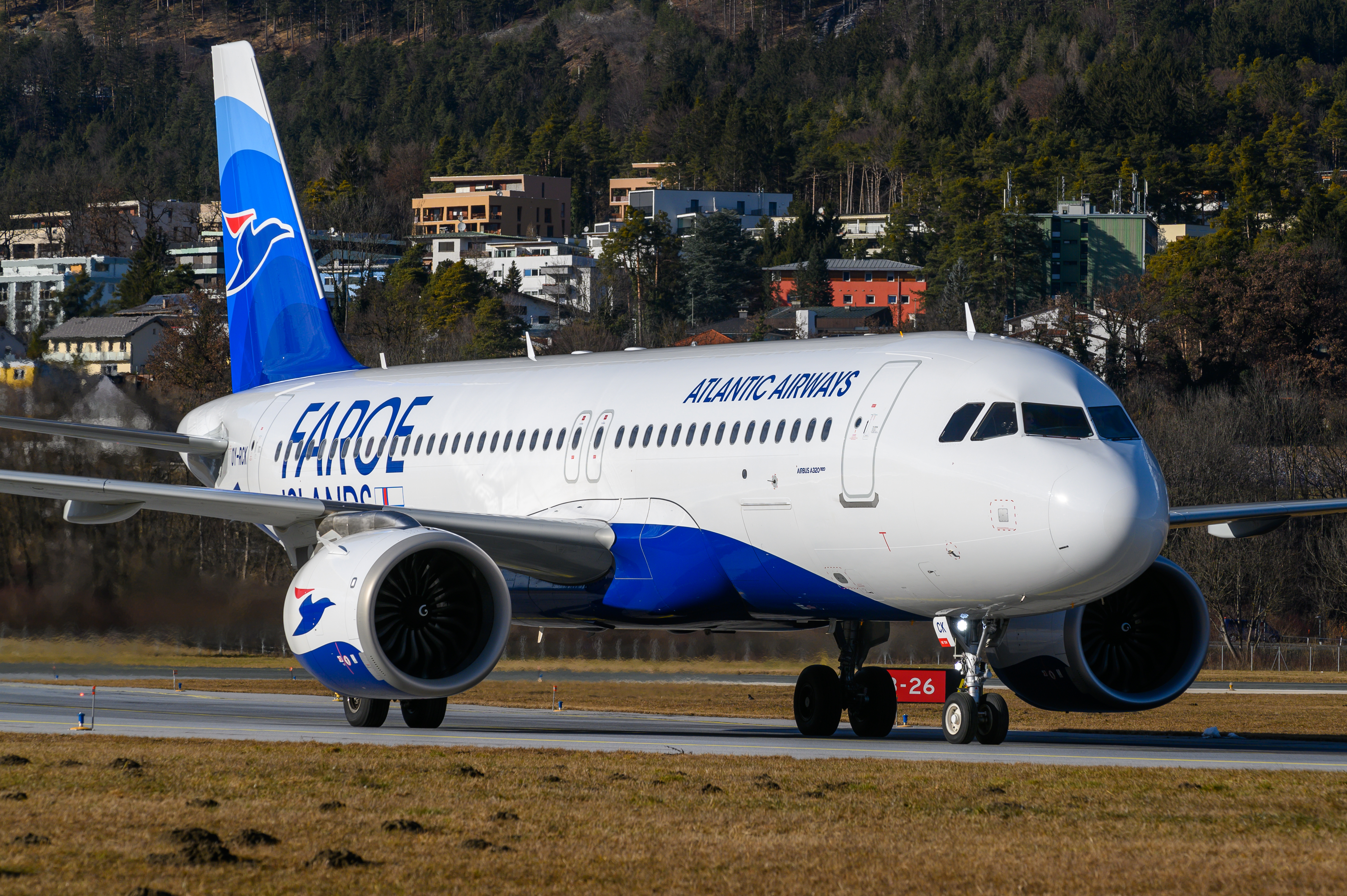
Airbus A320neo

As of July 2026, Atlantic Airways operates the following aircraft:

Atlantic Airways fixed-wing fleet
Aircraft	In service	Orders	Passengers	Notes
Airbus A320-200	2	—	174	
Airbus A320neo	2	2	174	
Total	4	2		

=== Helicopter fleet ===
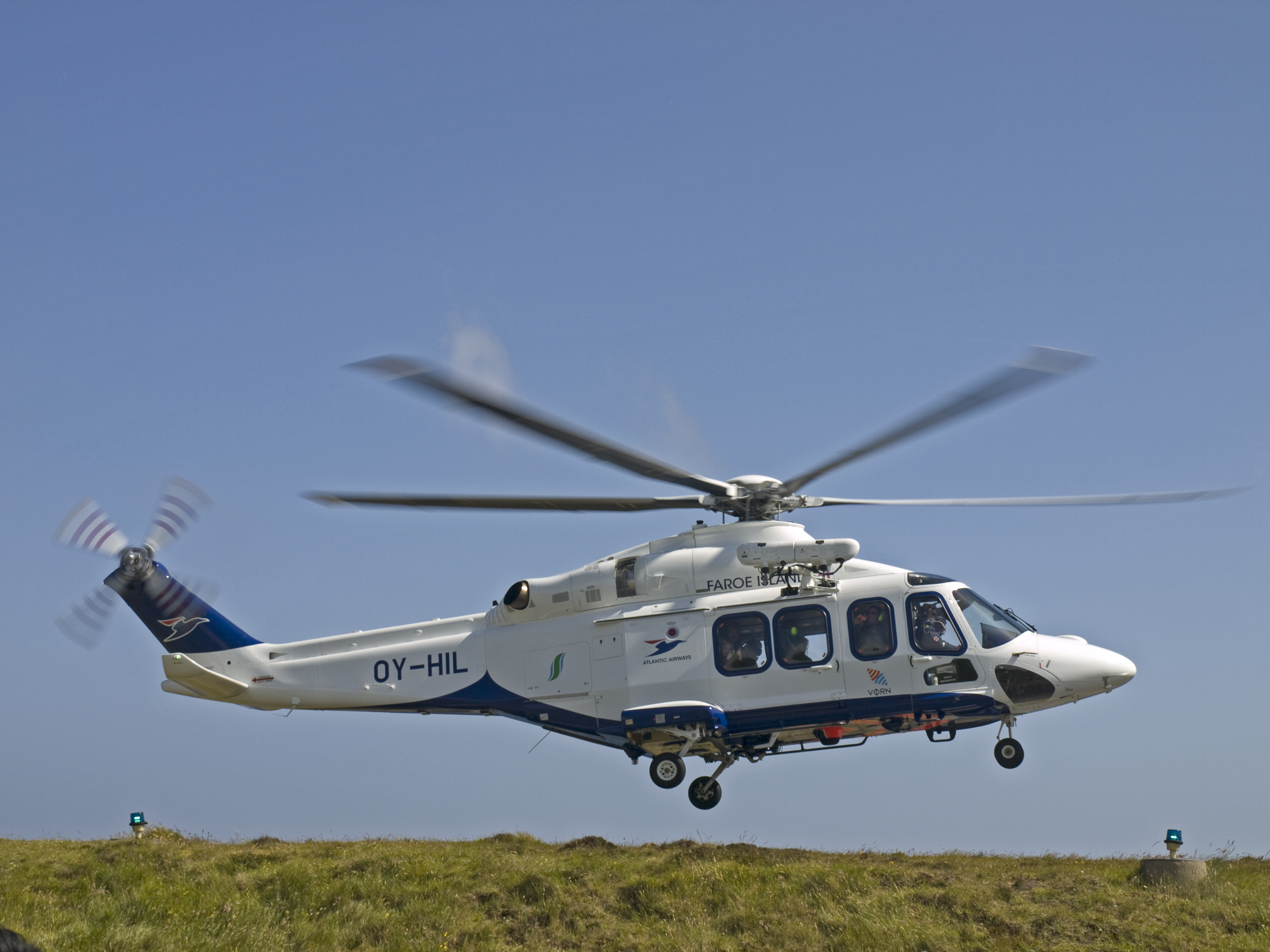
AgustaWestland AW139 helicopter

The AgustaWestland AW139 is the only primary helicopter used for flights to district villages. With a capacity to seat 15 passengers, the helicopter is used to shuttle passengers in the Faroe Islands.

Atlantic Airways helicopter fleet
Aircraft	In fleet	Orders	Passengers	Routes
Aircraft	In fleet	Orders	Economy	Routes
Leonardo AW139	2	—	15	Domestic; Charter; SAR
Total	2	—		

== Former fleet ==
As of August 2025, Atlantic Airways operated 2 Airbus A320 and 2 Airbus A320neo.

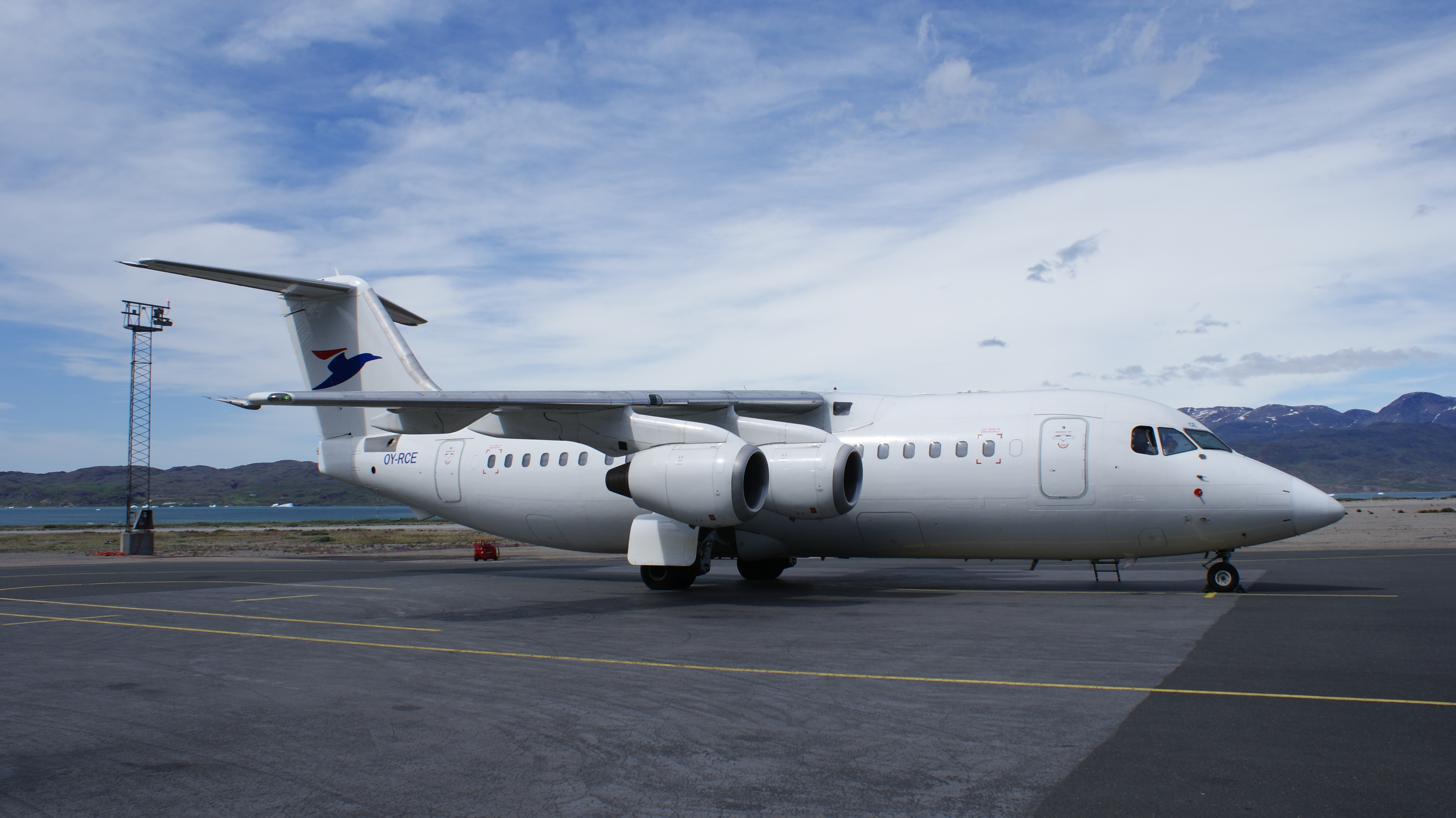
BAe 146-200 at Narsarsuaq Airport, Greenland

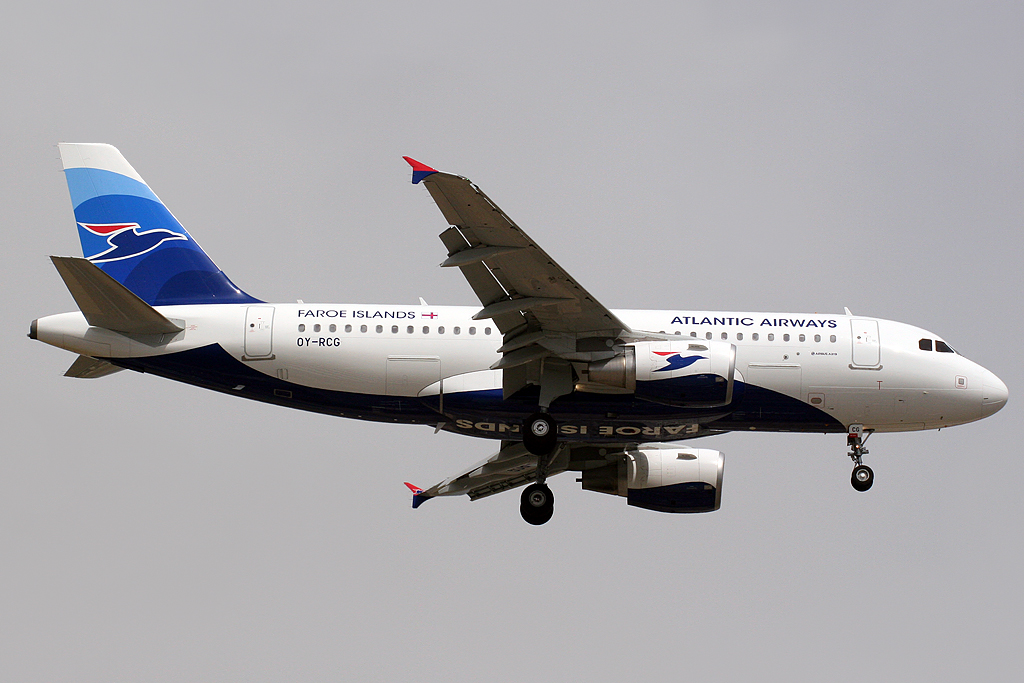
Airbus A319

The airline also previously operated: 3 Airbus A319 and 10 BAe 146-200 - One crashed in Atlantic Airways Flight 670

== Accidents and incidents ==
- 1989: an Atlantic Airways BAe 146–200 (registration OY-CRG) aircraft failed to stop at the end of the runway of Vágar Airport and was subsequently out of service for three weeks. This aircraft would later be destroyed in the crash of Flight 670.
- On the night 16–17 December 1992, a Bell 212 helicopter being used as an air ambulance crashed on Borðoy due to poor visibility. All five people on board were killed.
- On 10 October 2006, Atlantic Airways Flight 670, a BAe 146–200 (registration OY-CRG) skidded off the runway at Stord Airport in Norway. Of the 12 passengers and four crew, four people were killed and 12 of them survived with injuries. The aircraft had been chartered by Aker Kværner to fly personnel from Stavanger (Sola Airport) to Molde via Stord. The aircraft appeared to have been unable to stop on the runway when its spoilers failed to extend during landing. The aircraft crossed the threshold and continued down a slope before coming to rest and catching fire.

== See also ==
- List of airlines of Denmark
- List of airlines of the Faroe Islands
