= List of airlines of the Faroe Islands =

This is a list of airlines of the Faroe Islands, a Danish territory since 1830 and an autonomous territory since 1941. Many foreign carriers have serves here along with domestic carriers as early as 1980 with SL Helicopters.

== Active ==
Airline	Image	Year founded	Type	Notes
Atlantic Airways		1987	Passenger	flag carrier
FarCargo		2024	cargo	

== Defunct ==
Airline	Image	Year founded	Type	Notes
Faroe Airlines		1946	1946	
Faroe Airways		1965	1967	
FaroeJet		2005	2006	
SL helicopters		1980?	1994	

== Others ==
Airline	image	service years	notes
Maersk Air		1969-2005	While not based in the Faroe Islands it had a monopoly on all services to the Faroe Islands during the 1970s
