= Sørvágur Municipality =

Sørvágur Municipality Sørvágs kommuna (Faroese)
- Municipality
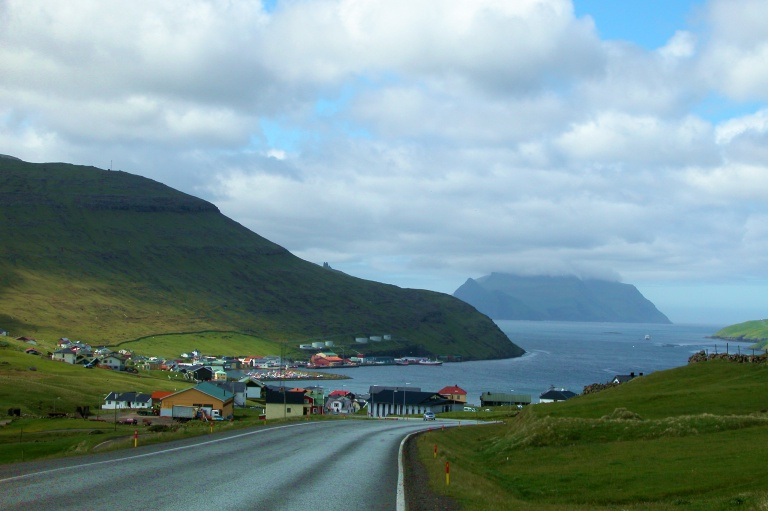
- Sørvágur, view on Mykines

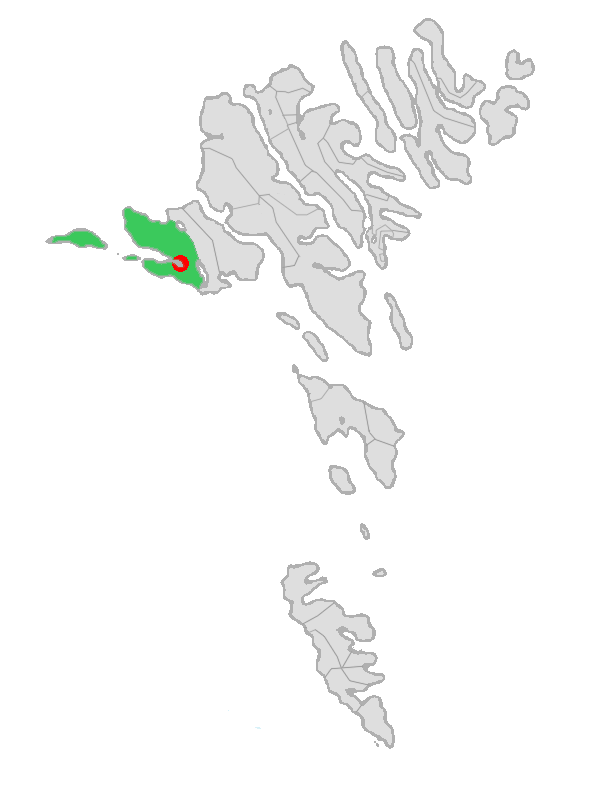
- Location of Sørvágur within Sørvágur municipality in the Faroe Islands
- Coordinates: 62°06′N 7°24′W
- State: Kingdom of Denmark
- Constituent country: Faroe Islands
- Island: Vágar
- Municipality: Sørvágur

Area
  - Total: 32.46 sq mi (84.08 km^{2})

Population (January 2024)
  - Total: 1,232
  - Density: 37.95/sq mi (14.65/km^{2})
- Time zone: GMT
  - Summer (DST): UTC+1 (WEST)
- Postal code: FO 380
- Website: http://www.sorvag.fo/

Sørvágur Municipality (Faroese: Sørvágs kommuna), is the westernmost municipality in the Faroe Islands.

It consists of the villages of Sørvágur, Bøur, Gásadalur and Mykines. Originally the municipality only included the village of Sørvágur. In January 2005 the municipality of Sørvágur agreed to merge with the smaller municipalities of Bøur/Gásadal and Mykines.

The new municipality had a population of 1,232 in 2024.

== Gallery ==
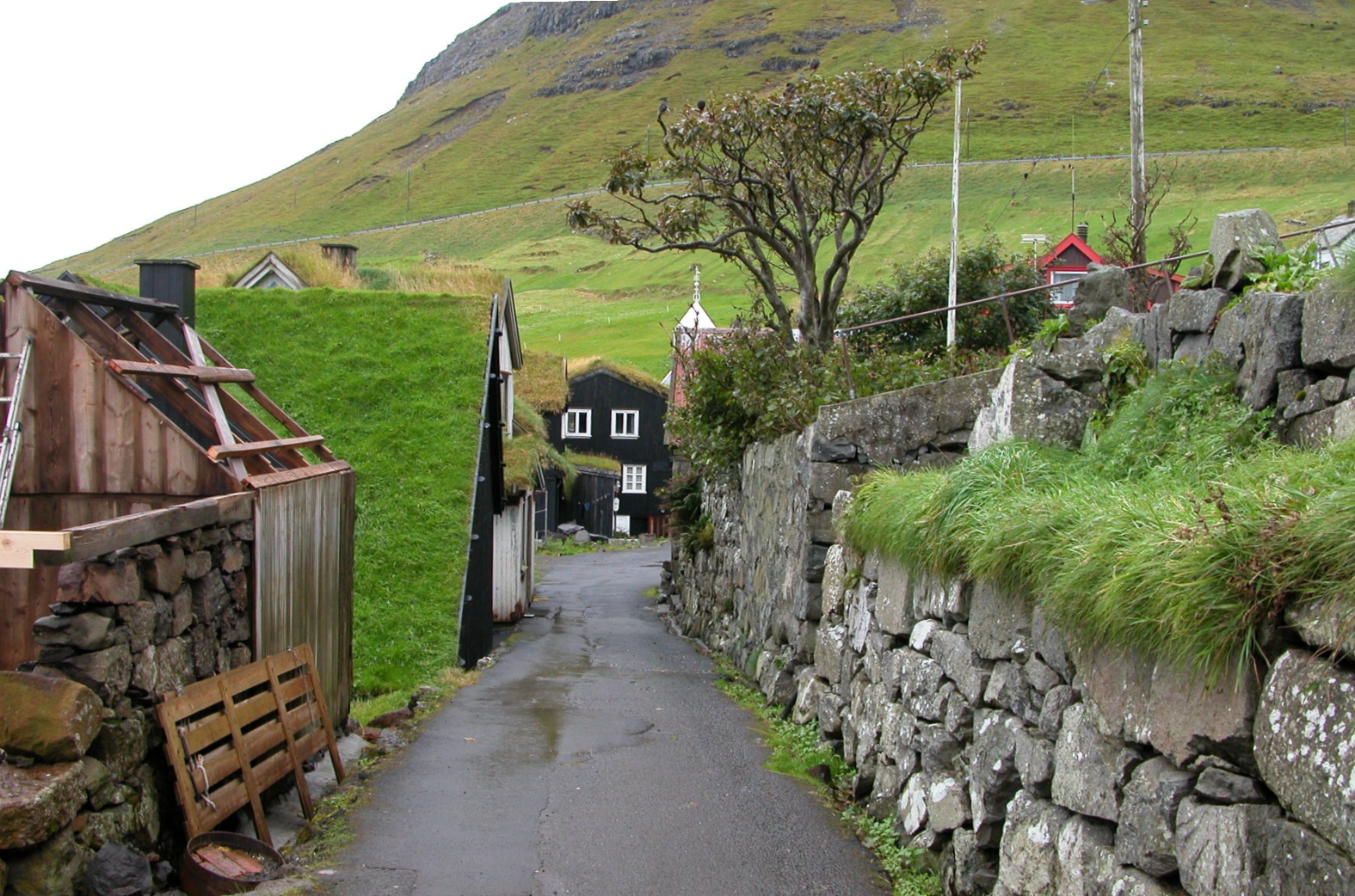
Village lane in Bøur

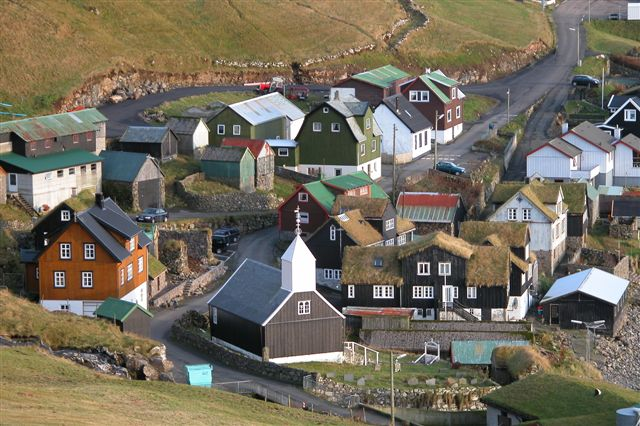
Bøur, October 2005
