= Sámal Joensen-Mikines =

Faroese painter

Sámal Joensen-Mikine
- Born: 23 February 1906; Mykines, Faroe Islands
- Died: 21 September 1979 (aged 73); Copenhagen, Denmark

Sámuel Joensen-Mikines (1906–1979) was a Faroese painter. He was the first recognised painter of the Faroe Islands and one of the Faroe Islands' most important artists. Many of his paintings have been displayed on Faroese stamps.

== Gallery ==
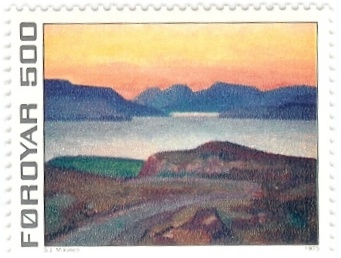
Hvítanes and Skálafjørður

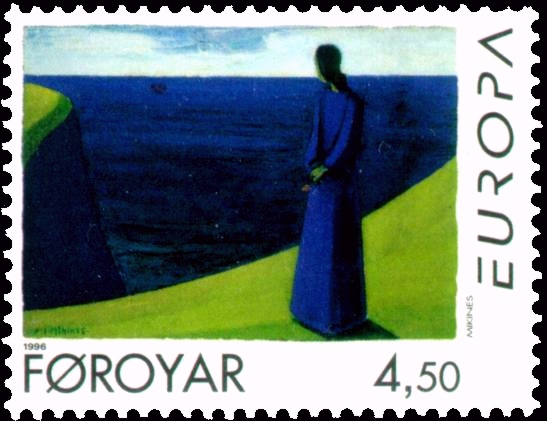
Teir leggja av landi (departure). Stamp of 1996

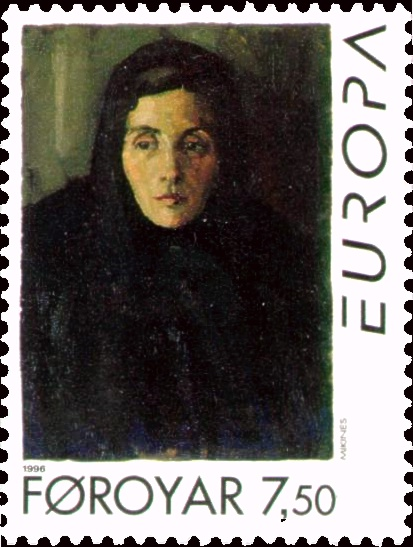
Mykineskona (a woman from Mykines his wife?), 1934, 56*42 cm, National Art Gallery in Tórshavn. Stamp of 1996

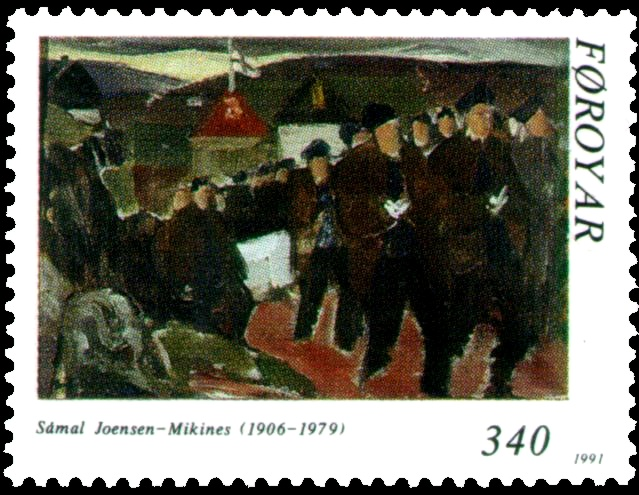
Líkskari (funeral procession), 1951, 60*88 cm, private ownership. stamp of 1991.

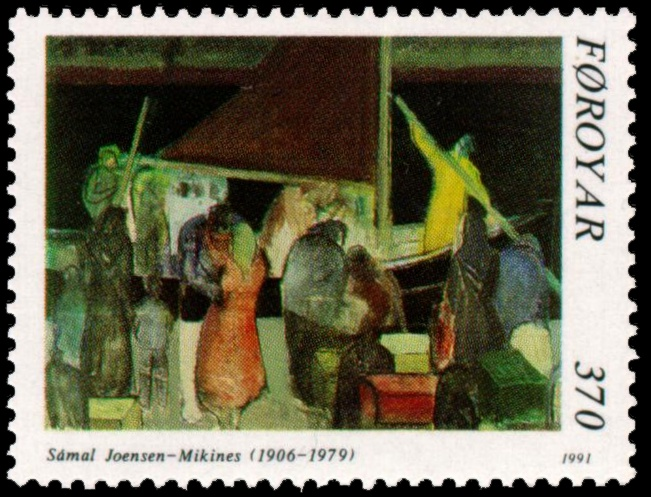
Fráferðin (The Farewell), 1955, 100x150cm, Listasavn Føroya.

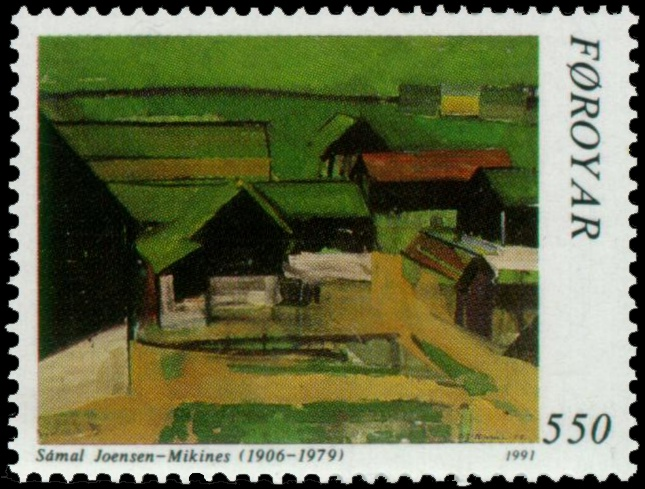
Handanágarður, 1957, 65x80cm, private property

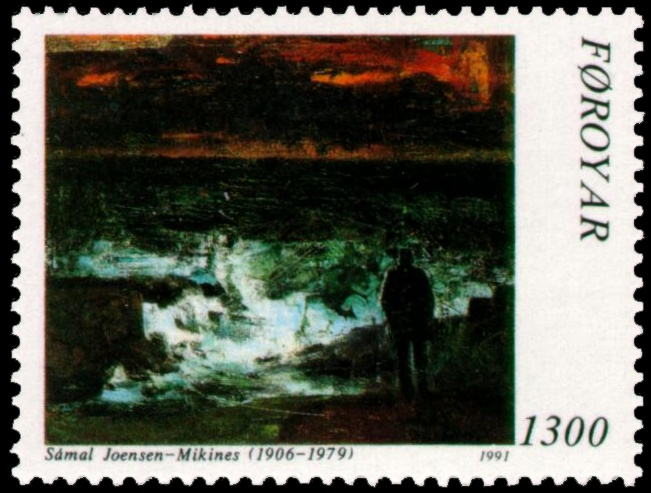
Vetrarmorgun (Winter Morning), 1958, 105x120cm, Listasavn Føroya.

== Sources ==
- The Faroe Islands Art Museum
- http://arthistory.heindorffhus.dk/frame-JoensenMikines.htm
