= Mykines, Faroe Islands =

Mykines Myggenæs
- Island
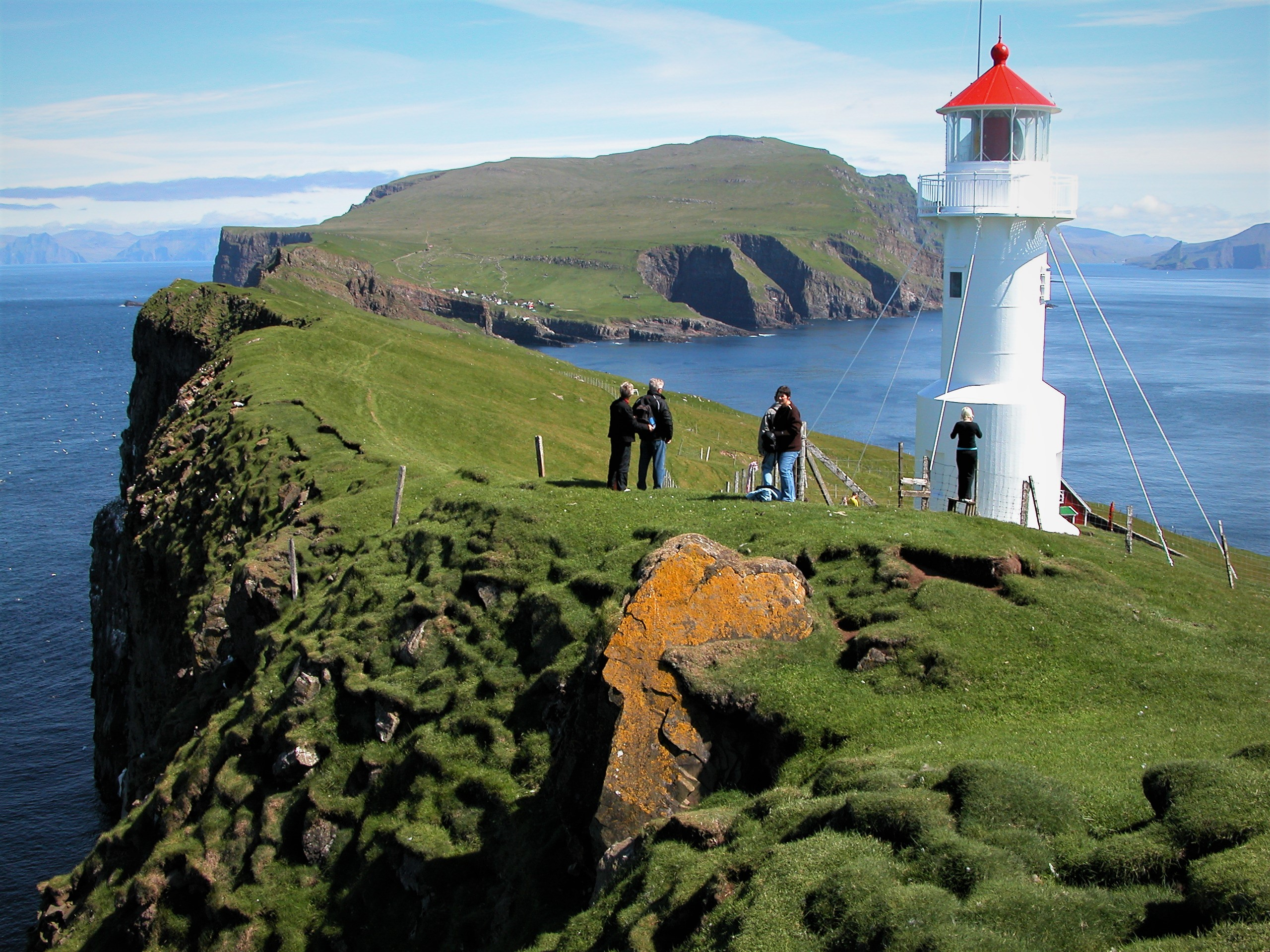
- Mykines seen from Mykineshólmur

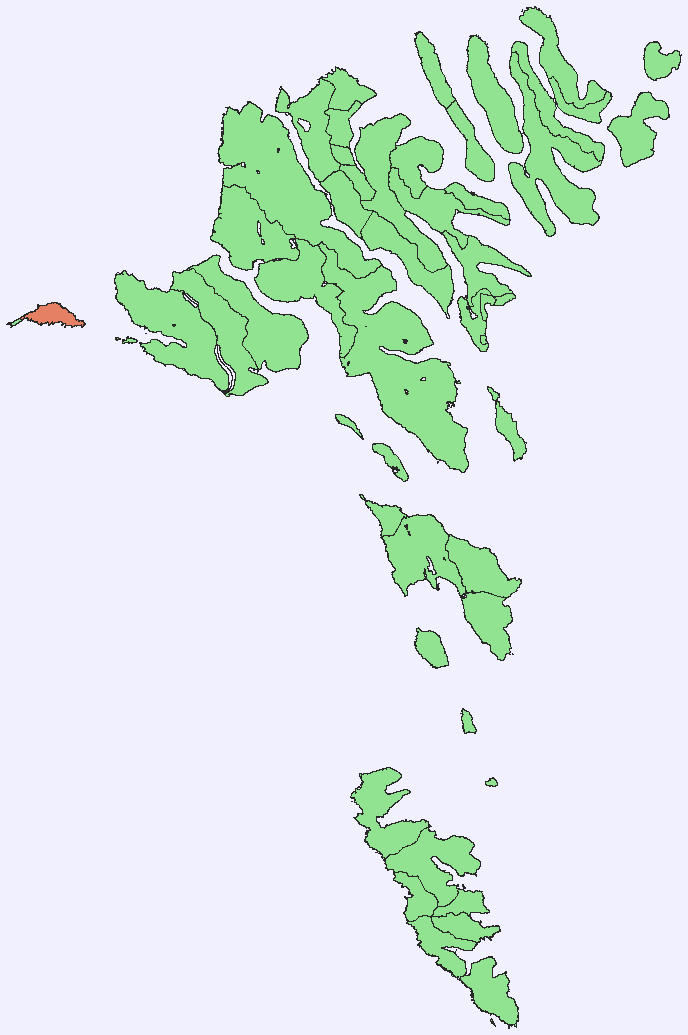
- Location within the Faroe Islands
- Coordinates: 62°06′N 7°36′W
- State: Kingdom of Denmark
- Constituent country: Faroe Islands

Area
  - Total: 10 km^{2} (3.9 sq mi)
- Highest elevation: 560 m (1,840 ft)

Population (08 September 2025)
  - Total: 9
  - Density: 0.90/km^{2} (2.3/sq mi)
- Time zone: UTC+0 (GMT)
  - Summer (DST): UTC+1 (EST)
- Calling code: 298

Designations

Ramsar Wetland
- Official name: Mykines
- Designated: 31 May 2012
- Reference no.: 2051

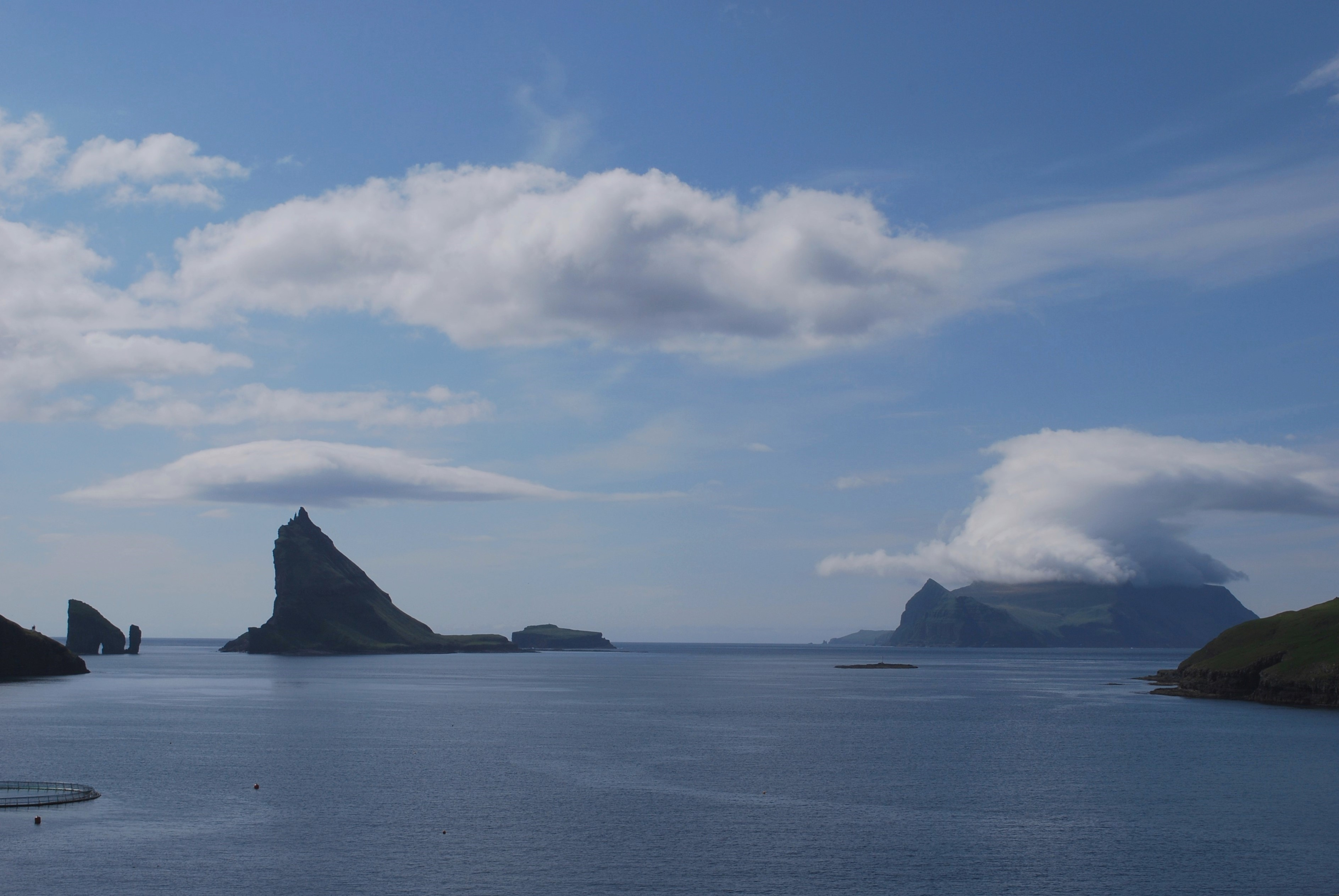
Mykines seen from Vágar

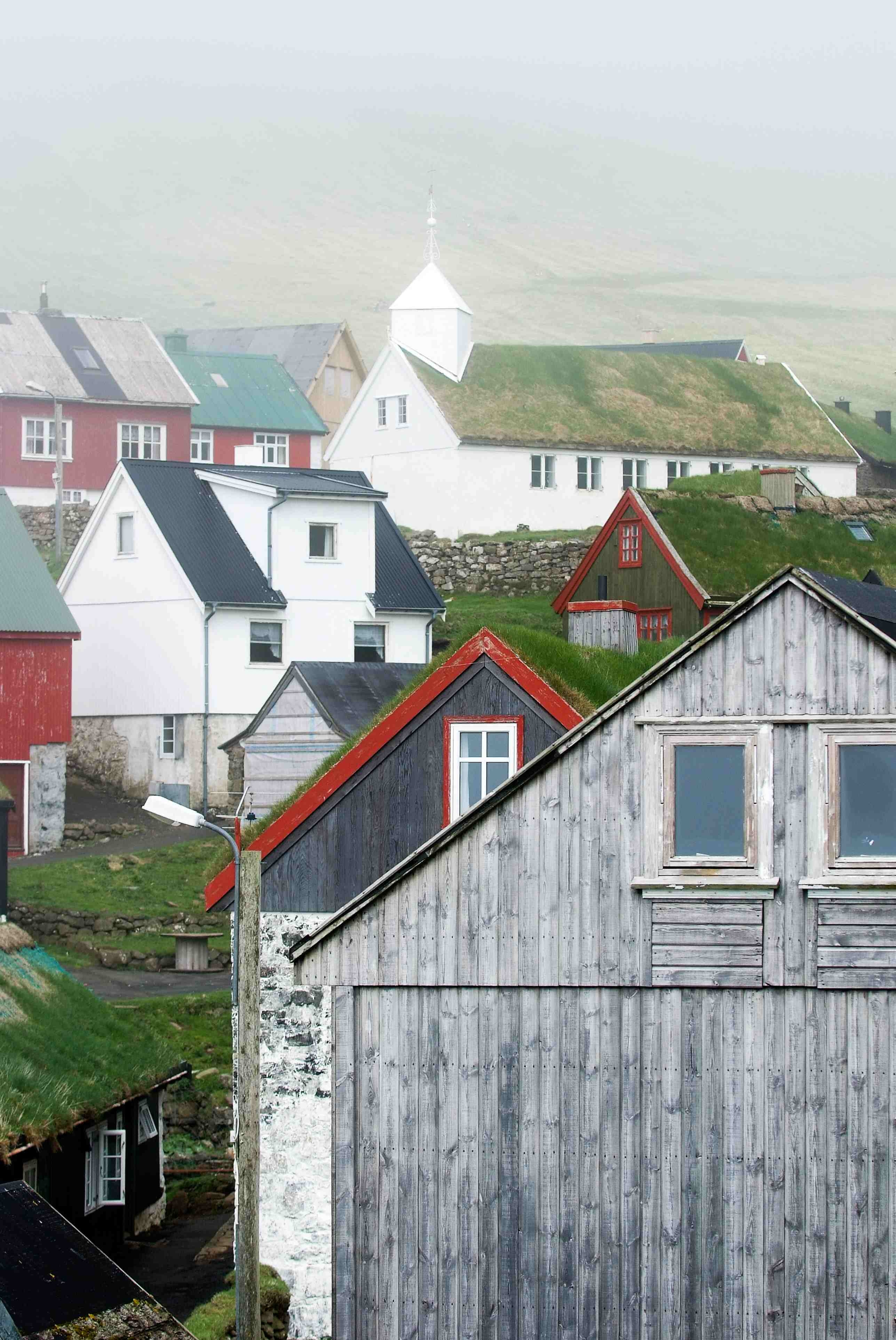
A misty May morning in Mykines

Mykines (Faroese pronunciation: [ˈmɪtʃʰɪnɛs], Danish: Myggenæs) is the westernmost of the 18 main islands of the Faroese Archipelago.

It lies west of 7.5 degrees W, effectively putting it in the UTC-1 region. However, Mykines uses Greenwich Mean Time like the rest of the Faroes. The only settlement on the island is also called Mykines.

== Description ==
On the northern side of the island is the valley of Korkadalur, where there are great columns of basalt, called the Stone-wood. To the west of Mykines is the 1 km long islet Mykineshólmur, with several sea stacks clustered at its western end, where a lighthouse was built in 1909. A 40m-long footbridge connects its eastern end with Mykines.

=== Geology ===
Mykines belongs to the oldest part of the Faroe Islands and was formed about 60 million years ago. The Faroese basalt is divided into three phases of eruption: the lower and oldest, the middle, and the upper and youngest; the lowest formed by the eruption of low-viscosity lava through long fissures, forming flat volcanoes. In the sound between Mykines and Mykineshólmur, Holmgjogv, one can see one of the most abundant of such flows on the Faroes, with a depth of about 50 m. The interspersed layers of softer volcanic tuff between the layers of basalt are differentially eroded, so forming, especially on the steep northern side of the islet, some of the richest bird cliffs in the world. The highest peak on the island is Knúkur at 560 metres above sea level.

=== Flora and fauna ===
Mountain hares (Lepus timidus) have been introduced, and inhabit the mountain area and surrounding valleys. The Mykines house mouse (Mus musculus mykinessiensis) is endemic for Mykines, and this might suggest an early introduction, maybe as early as in the 6th century by the Irish monks, who cultivated this island. Its closest relative was the now extinct St Kilda house mouse (Mus musculus muralis).

==== Important Bird Area ====
Large numbers of puffins and gannets inhabit Mykines and Mykineshólmur. On the rocks at the water's edge there are colonies of cormorants, while the eroded tuff layers in the cliffs make perfect nesting ledges for guillemots and razorbills. On the grassy slopes above the bird cliffs, thousands of puffins have their burrows, and their guano fertilizes the slopes. Access to the puffin colony is subject to a fee.

Mykines, including Mykineshólmur, has been identified as an Important Bird Area by BirdLife International because of its significance as a breeding site for seabirds, especially northern fulmars (50,000 pairs), Manx shearwaters (2500 pairs), European storm petrels (50,000 pairs), northern gannets (200 pairs), European shags (250 pairs), black-legged kittiwakes (23,000 Pairs), Atlantic puffins (125,000 pairs), common guillemots (9500 individuals) and black guillemots (200 pairs).

== History ==
It has been suggested that the name Mykines is pre-Norse in origin, coming from muc-innis, an Irish term for pig island. This may be a reference to whales, which are known as muc-mhara (sea sows) in Irish.

- 625 – Palynology indicates oats and barley were grown on Mykines, possibly by early settlers such as monks and hermits.
- 1592 – Peter Claussøn Friis, a Norwegian priest, described the Faroese mouse as a distinct species, and the Mykines mouse as a subgroup having especially long powerful hind legs.
- 1595 – (approx) on 25 April, fifty boats from around the country were shipwrecked in a sudden storm, and all the working men of Mykines lost their lives (estimated 20 to 30 men).
- 1667 – the Dutch ship Walcheren was wrecked on Mykines and the islanders salvaged goods from the ship.
- 1909 – the building of the Lighthouse on Mykines Holm and construction of the first bridge over Holmgjogv, the narrow strait between Mykines and Mykines Holm.
- 1928 – radio beacons were installed at Nólsoy and Mykines lighthouses, making radio navigation possible for the first time, and Mykines got a telephone connection to the outside world.
- 1942 – in spring British forces completed a radar station.
- 1953 – the second bridge over Holm Gjogv was built.
- 1970 - A Fokker F27 Friendship, with registration TF-FIL, from Flugfélag Íslands on flight from Bergen to Vágar Airport, crashed in bad weather on Mykines on 26 September. The captain and 7 passengers, all seated on the left side of the plane, were killed. 26 passengers and crew survived, some with serious injuries. Three passengers hiked for an hour to reach Mykines village to alert the authorities. Most of the villagers went up the mountain to aid the survivors before the arrival of the Danish patrol vessel F348 Hvidbjørnen. A marble memorial was placed in the church.
- 1970 – Mykines lighthouse was automated and the last man moved from the Holm, which had been occupied continuously from 1909 by a varying population of up to 22 people (including children).
- 1989 – the third bridge between Mykines and Mykineshólmur came into use in June.

== Population ==
The population of the island declined over the 20th century, with 11 permanent residents of Mykines village in 2004; the oldest inhabitant was 75 and the youngest six years old. Although there are 40 houses in the village, only six are inhabited year-round. Earlier Mykines was one of the largest villages in the Faroes, with a population of 170 people in 1940. From 1911 to 2004 Mykines was a separate community but in 2005 it merged administratively with Sørvagur kommune. Famous people from Mykines include the painter Sámal Joensen-Mikines (1906-1979).

Population of Mykines from 1769

Year	Population
1769	61
1870	114
1890	154
1925	179
1940	170
2004	11
2012	14
2018	10

== See also ==
- List of towns in the Faroe Islands
- Mykines, Mykines
