= Sørvágur =

Village in the Faroe Islands of Denmark

- Village
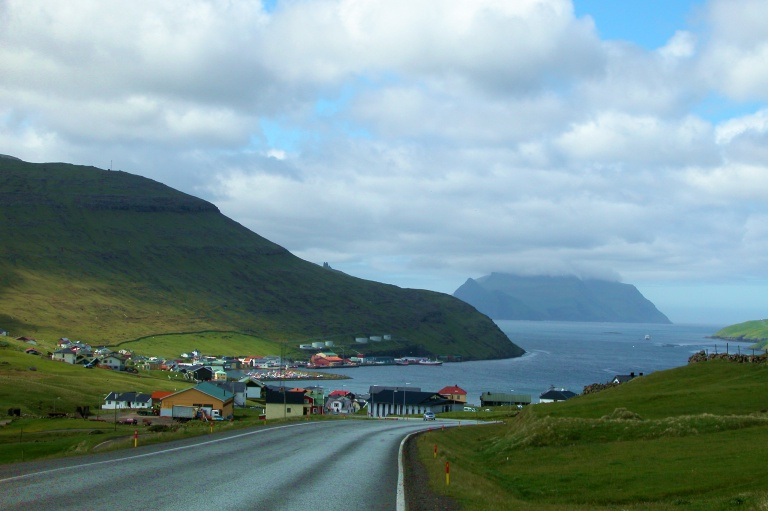
- Looking west towards Mykines Island

- Location in the Faroe Islands
- Coordinates: 62°4′13″N 7°19′20″W
- State: Kingdom of Denmark
- Constituent country: Faroe Islands
- Island: Vágar
- Municipality: Sørvágur Municipality

Population (September 2025)
  - Total: 1,170
- Time zone: GMT
  - Summer (DST): UTC+1 (EST)
- Postal code: FO 380
- Climate: Cfc

Sørvágur (Sørvåg) is a village at the landward end of Sørvágsfjørður fjord on the island of Vágar in the Faroe Islands.It is the largest village in Sørvágur Municipality.

== Climate ==
Vágar has colder and snowier winters than most places in the archipelago. Lower temperatures combined with higher precipitation are responsible for this, and measurable snow cover can be seen- a rarity in the Faroe Islands, in which snow cover (in areas which regularly experience it) is usually limited to a thin coating. The airport, at which data is recorded, is also located at a higher altitude on the island (84 meters above sea level), which might result in lower temperatures and higher precipitation than lower-lying areas on the island. Frost occurs an average on 62 days of the year,

Climate data for Vágar Airport, Vágar, 84 m.a.s.l.
Month	Jan	Feb	Mar	Apr	May	Jun	Jul	Aug	Sep	Oct	Nov	Dec	Year
Record high °C (°F)	10.3 (50.5)	9.5 (49.1)	12.5 (54.5)	14.8 (58.6)	20.8 (69.4)	21.6 (70.9)	24.0 (75.2)	23.5 (74.3)	20.5 (68.9)	14.0 (57.2)	12.0 (53.6)	12.2 (54.0)	24.0 (75.2)
Mean daily maximum °C (°F)	4.8 (40.6)	4.8 (40.6)	5.2 (41.4)	6.4 (43.5)	8.8 (47.8)	10.8 (51.4)	12.1 (53.8)	12.3 (54.1)	10.4 (50.7)	8.6 (47.5)	6.1 (43.0)	5.3 (41.5)	8.0 (46.4)
Daily mean °C (°F)	2.7 (36.9)	2.7 (36.9)	3.1 (37.6)	4.3 (39.7)	6.6 (43.9)	8.7 (47.7)	10.2 (50.4)	10.4 (50.7)	8.6 (47.5)	6.8 (44.2)	4.2 (39.6)	3.3 (37.9)	6.0 (42.8)
Mean daily minimum °C (°F)	0.5 (32.9)	0.6 (33.1)	0.9 (33.6)	2.1 (35.8)	4.4 (39.9)	6.6 (43.9)	8.3 (46.9)	8.5 (47.3)	6.7 (44.1)	4.8 (40.6)	2.1 (35.8)	1.1 (34.0)	3.9 (39.0)
Record low °C (°F)	−10.0 (14.0)	−11.7 (10.9)	−10.6 (12.9)	−9.9 (14.2)	−5.0 (23.0)	−0.3 (31.5)	1.4 (34.5)	1.0 (33.8)	−2.5 (27.5)	−6.4 (20.5)	−10.0 (14.0)	−10.9 (12.4)	−11.7 (10.9)
Average precipitation mm (inches)	163 (6.4)	122 (4.8)	141 (5.6)	120 (4.7)	83 (3.3)	81 (3.2)	115 (4.5)	133 (5.2)	151 (5.9)	164 (6.5)	140 (5.5)	142 (5.6)	1,555 (61.2)
Average precipitation days (≥ 1.0 mm)	23	19	21	18	13	11	15	18	19	20	18	20	215
Source: Danish Meteorological Institute

== Sport ==
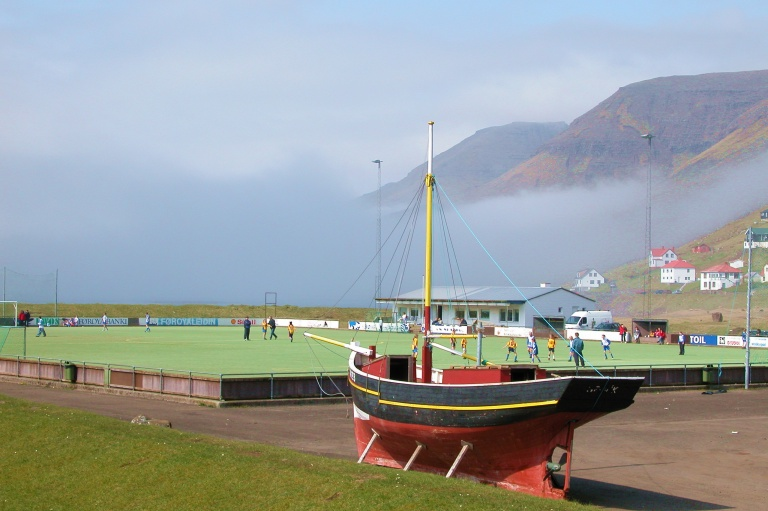
The football field in Sørvágur and an old wooden sail ship. Hillfog on the hills and on the fjord Sørvágsfjørður.

=== Sport ===
The local sport association of Sørvágur is called SÍ. They compete mainly in football and volleyball. The football club of Sørvágur has merged with the club from other villages on the island into the football club 07 Vestur.

== Literature ==
- Sonni Jacobsen: Sørvágur og sørvingar. Sørvágur: Forlagið Ytstifjórðingur 1995–1996. (2 vol.)
  - Abstract from vol. 1 (Faroese)
  - Abstract from vol. 2 (Faroese)

== See also ==
- List of districts in Sørvág
- List of towns in the Faroe Islands
